= Eusebio Samwel Kyando =

Tanzanian Catholic prelate

The Most Reverend Eusebio Samwel Kyando
- Bishop of Njombe
- Church: Catholic Church
- Archdiocese: Roman Catholic Archdiocese of Songea
- See: Njombe
- Appointed: 19 October 2023
- Installed: 14 January 2024
- Predecessor: Alfred Leonhard Maluma
- Successor: Incumbent

Orders
- Ordination: 19 September 1996
- Consecration: 14 January 2024 by Polycarp Cardinal Pengo

Personal details
- Born: Eusebio Samwel Kyando; 30 September 1964 (age 62) Njombe, Diocese of Njombe, Tanzania
- Motto: In humilitate et mansuetudine

Eusebio Samwel Kyando (born 7 March 1964) is a Tanzanian Roman Catholic prelate who is the Bishop of the Roman Catholic Diocese of Njombe, Tanzania. He was appointed bishop of Njombe on 19 October 2023 by Pope Francis.

== Early life and education ==
He was born on 7 March 1964 in Njombe, in the Catholic Diocese of Njombe, in the Njombe Region, Tanzania. He studied at the Saint Kizito Minor Seminary in Mafinga, in the diocese of Iringa. He then studied philosophy and Theology at Saint Augustine Major Seminary in Peramiho, Ruvuma Region.

He holds an advanced diploma in finance and accounting awarded by the St. Augustine University of Tanzania (SAUT), in 2002, having studied there since 1999. He also holds a master's degree in professional accounting obtained from the University of Tasmania in Australia. He also studied at the Università Cattolica del Sacro Cuore (Catholic University of the Sacred Heart of Milan), where he obtained a Master of Business Administration. He also passed the examinations to qualify as a Certified Public Accountant (CPA) in Tanzania. In 2015 he began studies at the Catholic University of Eastern Africa (CUEA), in Nairobi, Kenya. He graduated from there with a Doctor of Business Administration degree in 2021.

== Priest ==
He was ordained priest of Njombe on 19 September 1996. He served in that capacity until 19 October 2023.

While priest, he served in various roles inside and outside his diocese including as:

- Deputy priest of Matamba Parish from 1996 until 1997
- Parish coordinator of the UVIKANJO Youth Movement from 1996 until 1997
- Teacher of religion at Itamba Secondary School from 1996 until 1997
- Deputy parish priest of Mlangali Parish from 1997 until 1999
- Parish coordinator of the UVIKANJO and TYCS Youth Movements from 1997 until 1999
- Teacher of religion and Bible knowledge at Ulayasi Secondary School from 1997 until 1999
- Lecturer and formator at Saint Joseph Minor Seminary, Kilocha in 1999.
- Tutorial assistant in the Accounting and Finance Department of SAUT in Mwanza
- Professional advisor to the University Accounting Office of SAUT in 2004
- Deputy parish priest of the Catholic Parish of Sandy Bay and Taroona in Australia from 2005 until 2006
- Head of the pastoral care of African migrants in the archdiocese of Hobart, Australia
- Assistant lecturer at SAUT
- Lecturer at SAUT
- Bursar General of the diocese of Njombe in 2011
- Finance officer and treasury back officer at Mkombozi Commercial Bank, jointly managed with the Tanzania Episcopal Conference, from 2012 until 2015.
- Representative of the apostolic administrator, since 2021.

== Bishop ==
On 19 October 2023 the Holy Father appointed him Bishop of the Diocese of Njombe, Tanzania. He was consecrated and installed on 14 January 2024 on the grounds of St. Bakita School, in Njombe, Diocese of Njombe. The Principal Consecrator was Archbishop Polycarp Cardinal Pengo, Archbishop Emeritus of Dar es Salaam assisted by Archbishop Damian Denis Dallu, Archbishop of Songea and Bishop John Chrisostom Ndimbo, Bishop of Mbinga.

On 6 April 2021, Bishop Alfred Leonhard Maluma of the Diocese of Njombe, died following an automobile accident. The Holy Father appointed Bishop John Chrisostom Ndimbo of the Diocese of Mbinga as apostolic administrator of Njombe Diocese beginning on 8 April 2021. On 14 January 2024, that administratorship ceased when Bishop Eusebio Samwel Kyando was installed as the Ordinary of the diocese.

== See also ==
- Catholic Church in Tanzania

== Succession table ==
Catholic Church titles
Preceded by Alfred Leonhard Maluma (Bishop: 8 June 2002 to 6 April 2021)	Bishop of Njombe (since 19 October 2023)	Succeeded by Incumbent
