= Filbert Felician Mhasi =

Tanzanian Catholic prelate

The Most Reverend Filbert Felician Mhasi
- Bishop of Tunduru-Masasi
- Church: Catholic Church
- Archdiocese: Roman Catholic Archdiocese of Songea
- See: Tunduru-Masasi
- Appointed: 8 December 2018
- Installed: 17 February 2019
- Predecessor: Castor Paul Msemwa
- Successor: Incumbent

Orders
- Ordination: 3 July 2001
- Consecration: 17 February 2019 by Polycarp Cardinal Pengo

Personal details
- Born: Filbert Felician Mhasi; 30 November 1970 (age 54); Biro, Diocese of Mahenge, Ulanga District, Morogoro Region, Tanzania

Filbert Felician Mhasi (born 30 November 1970) is a Tanzanian Roman Catholic prelate who is the Bishop of the Roman Catholic Diocese of Tunduru-Masasi, Tanzania. He was appointed bishop of Tunduru-Masasi on 8 December 2018 by Pope Francis.

== Early life and education ==
He was born in Biro, Diocese of Mahenge, Ulanga District, Morogoro Region, Tanzania, on 30 November 1970. He attended primary school in his home area. Between 1986 and 1992, he studied at the St. Francis Minor Seminary Kasita at Ifakara, for his secondary education. In 1993 he entered the Our Lady of the Angels Major Seminary at Kibosho, Moshi Diocese, to study Philosophy. He graduated from there in 1995. He then transferred to the St. Paul Major Seminary in Kipalapala in Tabora Region, where he studied Theology from 1995 until 1998.

In 2001 he entered the Mwenge Catholic University in Moshi City, where he graduated with a Diploma in Education in 2003. He also holds a degree of Master of Philosophy awarded by Duquesne University in Pittsburgh, Pennsylvania, United States, having studied there from 2005 until 2009.

== Priest ==
He was ordained priest of Mahenge Diocese on 3 July 2001. He served in that capacity until 10 December 2018.

As a priest, he served in various roles including as:

- Vice-Rector, bursar and docent at the St. Francis Minor Seminary Kasita, Ifakara from 2003 until 2004
- Rector of the St. Francis Minor Seminary Kasita, Ifakara from 2009 until 2014
- Parish priest of the Cathedral in Kwiro, Mahenge Diocese since 2014
- Zone Vicar since 2014
- Director of St. Joseph Secondary School since 2015
- Diocesan president of the UMAWATA Association of Priests since 2015.

== Bishop ==
On 8 December 2018 the Holy Father Francis appointed him Bishop of the Roman Catholic Diocese of Tunduru-Masasi, Tanzania. He was consecrated and installed at the St. Francis Xavier Cathedral, at Tunduru, Diocese of Tunduru-Masasi on 17 February 2019. The Principal Consecrator was Polycarp Cardinal Pengo, Archbishop of Dar-es-Salaam assisted by Archbishop Damian Denis Dallu, Archbishop of Songea and Bishop Agapiti Ndorobo, Bishop of Mahenge.

== See also ==
- Catholic Church in Tanzania

== Succession table ==
Catholic Church titles
Preceded by Castor Paul Msemwa (25 August 2005 - 19 October 2017)	Bishop of Tunduru-Masasi (since 8 December 2018)	Succeeded by Incumbent
