= John Chrisostom Ndimbo =

Tanzanian Catholic prelate

The Most Reverend John Chrisostom Ndimbo
- Bishop of Mbinga
- Church: Catholic Church
- Archdiocese: Roman Catholic Archdiocese of Songea
- See: Mbinga
- Appointed: 12 March 2011
- Installed: 5 June 2011
- Predecessor: Emmanuel Alex Mapunda
- Other post(s): Apostolic Administrator of Diocese of Njombe (8 April 2021 – 14 January 2024)

Orders
- Ordination: 21 June 1989
- Consecration: 5 June 2011 by Polycarp Cardinal Pengo
- Rank: Bishop

Personal details
- Born: John Chrisostom Ndimbo; 12 October 1960 (age 64); Kipololo, Diocese of Mbinga, Ruvuma Region, Tanzania

Styles of John Chrisostom Ndimbo
- Reference style: Your Lordship; The Most Reverend
- Spoken style: His Lordship
- Religious style: Bishop

John Chrisostom Ndimbo (born 12 October 1960) is a Tanzanian Catholic prelate who serves as the Bishop of the Roman Catholic Diocese of Mbinga. He was appointed bishop of Mbinga on 12 March 2011 by Pope Benedict XVI. From 8 April 2021 until 14 January 2024 he served as the Apostolic Administrator of the Roman Catholic Diocese of Njombe, at the direction of Pope Francis.

== Background and education ==
He was born on 12 October 1960, at Kipololo, Diocese of Mbinga, Ruvuma Region, Tanzania. He attended primary school in his home area. In 1970 he entered the Hanga Minor Seminary in the Roman Catholic Archdiocese of Songea. From 1974 he attended the Likonde Minor Seminary, in Mbinga, graduating in 1977. He then studied at Nyegezi Seminary in Mwanza, where he concluded his secondary school education.

He studied philosophy and Theology at the Peramiho Major Seminary in Peramiho, in the Roman Catholic Diocese of Karonga, from 1983 until 1989. Later, he studied at De La Salle University in Manila, Philippines, from 1991. He graduated from there with a Bachelor of Arts degree and a master's degree in Education Management in 1994.

== Priesthood ==
He was ordained a priest of the diocese of Mbinga on 21 June 1989. He served in that capacity until 12 March 2011.

As priest, he served in several roles inside and outside his diocese including as:

- Lecturer at the Likonde Minor Seminary in Likonde, from 1989 until 1990
- Rector and lecturer at the Likonde Minor Seminary
- Secretary for Education in the Diocese
- Director of St Louis Girls' Secondary School from 1995 until 2010
- In October 2010 he was nominated Executive Secretary of the Education Department in the Episcopal Conference of Tanzania

== As bishop ==
He was appointed Bishop of the Roman Catholic Diocese of Mbinga, Tanzania on 12 March 2011. He was consecrated and installed at Mbinga in the Metropolitan Archdiocese of Songea, by the hands of Polycarp Cardinal Pengo, Archbishop of Dar es Salaam assisted by Archbishop Norbert Wendelin Mtega, Archbishop of Songea and Bishop Emmanuel Alex Mapunda, Bishop Emeritus of Mbinga. He succeeded Emmanuel Alex Mapunda, the Bishop Emeritus of Mbinga, who retired, having attained the retirement age of 75 years.

On 6 April 2021, Bishop Alfred Leonhard Maluma of the Diocese of Njombe, died after an automobile accident. On 8 April 2021, The Holy Father appointed Bishop John Chrisostom Ndimbo of the Diocese of Mbinga as apostolic administrator of Njombe Diocese. That administratorship ceased on 14 January 2024, the day Bishop Eusebio Samwel Kyando was installed as the Ordinary of the diocese.

== See also ==
- Catholic Church in Tanzania

== Succession table ==
Catholic Church titles
Preceded by Emmanuel Alex Mapunda (22 December 1986 – 12 March 2011)	Bishop of Mbinga (Since 12 March 2021)	Succeeded by Incumbent
