= Diocese of Tunduru–Masasi =

Roman Catholic diocese in Tanzania, Africa

Coordinates: 10.6794°S 35.6462°E

Diocese of Tunduru–Masasi Dioecesis Tunduruensis–Masasiensis

Location
- Country: Tanzania
- Metropolitan: Songea

Statistics
- Area: 22,730 km^{2} (8,780 sq mi)
- Population: Total; Catholics: (as of 2004); 669,854; 90,740 (13.5%)

Information
- Rite: Latin Rite

Current leadership
- Pope: Leo XIV
- Bishop: Filbert Felician Mhasi

The Roman Catholic Diocese of Tunduru–Masasi (Latin: Dioecesis Tunduruensis–Masasiensis) is a diocese located in Tunduru–Masasi in the ecclesiastical province of Songea in Tanzania.

The diocese has an area covering 22,730 square kilometers. In the East region borders with the diocese of Mtwara, the Northeast diocese of Lindi, Mozambique to the South, to the West the Archdiocese of Songea. There are now 24 local priests and 19 parishes. The diocese is in the extreme Southern part of Tanzania close to the border with Mozambique. It is surrounded by the Selous Game Reserve.

== History ==
- October 17, 1986: Established by the Holy See as Diocese of Tunduru – Masasi after suppressing the Diocese of Nachingwea

== Bishops ==
=== Ordinaries ===
- Bishops of Tunduru–Masasi (Roman rite)
  - Bishop Polycarp Pengo (October 17, 1986 – January 22, 1990), appointed Coadjutor Archbishop of Dar-es-Salaam; future Cardinal
  - Bishop Magnus Mwalunyungu (March 30, 1992 – August 25, 2005)
  - Bishop Castor Paul Msemwa (August 25, 2005 – October 19, 2017)
  - Bishop Filbert Felician Mhasi (February 17, 2019 to date)

=== Coadjutor Bishop ===
- Castor Paul Msemwa (2004-2005)

== See also ==
- Roman Catholicism in Tanzania

== Sources ==
- GCatholic.org
- Catholic Hierarchy
