= Wolfgang Pisa =

Tanzanian Catholic prelate (born 1965)

The Right Reverend Wolfgang Pisa OFM Cap
- Bishop of Lindi; President of Tanzania Episcopal Conference
- Church: Catholic
- Archdiocese: Songea
- Diocese: Lindi
- See: Lindi
- Appointed: 09 April 2022
- Installed: 26 June 2022
- Predecessor: Bruno Pius Ngonyani
- Other post: President of Tanzania Episcopal Conference
- Previous posts: Rector Maua Seminary (2005-2008); Superior General of the Capuchins Province of Tanzania (2011-2016; Parochial Vicar Kibaigwa Dodoma (2019-2020); Parochial Vicar St Francis of Assisi Parish, Ngulelo, Arusha (2020-2022); Lecturer SAUT, Arusha Campus (2020-2022)

Orders
- Ordination: 01 September 1999
- Consecration: 26 June 2022 by Beatus Kinyaiya, O.F.M. Cap

Personal details
- Born: Wolfgang Pisa; 6 July 1965 (age 60) Karatu, Arusha, Tanzania
- Denomination: Catholic
- Residence: Lindi
- Education: Diploma in Philosophy and religious studies; Bachelor in Divinity; Bachelor in Theology; Masters of Education-Applied Social Psychology; Masters in Social Ethics; Phd in Social Ethics
- Alma mater: Franciscan Seminary Maua; Saint Augustine Major Seminary, Kabwe, Zambia; Saint Dominic Major Seminary, Lusaka, Zambia; University of Dar es Salaam, Tanzania; Catholic University of America, Washington DC, US
- Motto: Sitio I thirst ("I am thirst" ~John 19:28b)
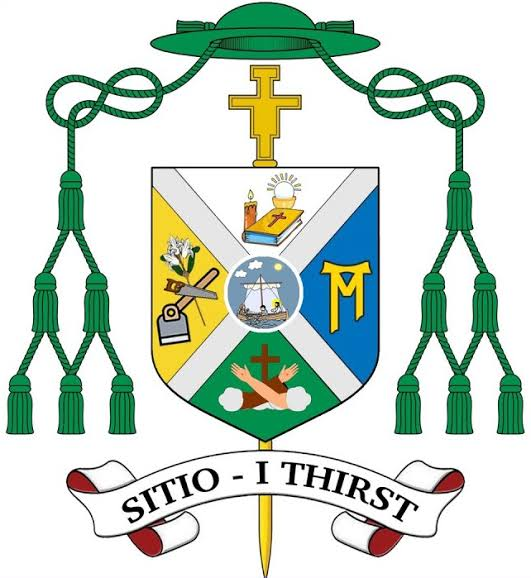
- Coat of arms

Wolfgang Pisa OFM Cap (born 6 July 1965) is a Tanzanian prelate of the Catholic Church. He the bishop of Lindi since 2022. Currently he is President of Tanzania Episcopal Conference (TEC) following the election on 22 June 2024.

== Early life and priesthood ==
Wolfgang Pisa was born on 6 July 1965 in Karatu, Diocese of Mbulu, being the first born out of eight children. From 1983 to 1986, he received his secondary education from the form one to the form four at Franciscan Seminary Maua and then continued his studies in the form Five and six before going to the National service (JKT). In 1989, he joined the Capuchin Friars Minor (OFM Cap) for Monastic life and priesthood formation. He was sent to St. Augustine seminary in Kabwe, Zambia and in 1992 he was awarded a diploma in philosophy and religious studies.

He then joined St. Dominic major seminary, Woodland Lusaka for Bible Studies. In 1996 he was awarded a bachelor's degree in divinity. He later joined a Jordanian university in Morogoro, Tanzania and was awarded a bachelor's degree in theology.

After 10 years of formation and training, finally on 1 September 1999 he was ordained Priest. He began to carry out his mission at the Maua Seminary, Moshi as a teacher.

In 2000 he was sent to study at University of Dar es Salaam (UDSM), and in 2002 he was awarded a master's degree (Masters of Education - Applied Social Psychology). He returned to Maua Seminary as a teacher and in 2005 was appointed Rector of the seminary.

In 2008 he was sent by the Church to study at the Catholic University of America (Washington), and in 2011 he was awarded a Masters in Social Ethics.

When he returned, he was elected Head of the Capuchin province of Tanzania and led until 2016, before being sent back to the Catholic University of America to study for a PhD in Social Ethics.

In 2019, he returned and served Kibaigwa Parish, Dodoma until 2020 when he was appointed assistant parish priest at St Francis of Assisi Parish, Ngulelo Arusha, and Lecturer at St. Augustine University of Tanzania, Arusha Campus.

He served the parish and University until 2022 when he was appointed by Pope Francis to be the Bishop of the Roman Catholic Diocese of Lindi.

== Episcopate ==
On 2 April 2022, Pope Francis appointed him bishop of Lindi. On 26 June 2022, Archbishop Beatus Kinyaiya, O.F.M. Cap. of Dodoma ordained him bishop in Lindi. His Co-consecrators were his predecessor Bishop Bruno Pius Ngonyani and Damian Denis Dallu, Archbishop of Songea. On 22 June 2024, he was elected President of the Tanzania Episcopal Conference (TEC), after the end of term of his predecessor Archbishop Gervas John Mwasikwabhila Nyaisonga.
