= Romanus Elamu Mihali =

Tanzanian Roman Catholic prelate (born 1969)

The Most Reverend Romanus Elamu Mihali
- Bishop of Iringa, Tanzania
- Church: Catholic Church
- Archdiocese: Roman Catholic Archdiocese of Mbeya
- See: Roman Catholic Diocese of Iringa
- Appointed: 28 January 2025
- Installed: 27 April 2025
- Predecessor: Tarcisius Ngalalekumtwa
- Successor: Incumbent

Orders
- Ordination: 13 July 2000
- Consecration: 27 April 2025 by Cardinal Polycarp Pengo
- Rank: Bishop

Personal details
- Born: Romanus Elamu Mihali; 10 June 1969 (age 56) Itulituli, Mufindi, Iringa Region, Tanzania

Styles of Romanus Elamu Mihali
- Reference style: Your Lordship; The Most Reverend
- Spoken style: His Lordship
- Religious style: Archbishop

Romanus Elamu Mihali (born 10 June 1969) is a Tanzanian Catholic prelate who is the Bishop of the Roman Catholic Diocese of Iringa in Tanzania since 28 January 2025. Before that, from 13 July 2000 until 22 December 2023, he was a priest of the Diocese of Iringa. On 22 December 2023 he was incardinated a priest of the Roman Catholic Diocese of Mafinga. He served in that role until his appointment as bishop of Iringa Diocese. His consecration and installation at Iringa took place on Sunday, 27 April 2025.

== Background and education ==
He was born on 10 June 1969 in Itulituli, Mufindi, Iringa Region, Tanzania. He studied philosophy and theology at Peramiho Major Seminary in Songea, Ruvuma Region. He studied at the University of Kerala, in India, graduating from there with a Bachelor of Science in natural sciences, a Bachelor of Education and Master of Science in zoological sciences.

== Priesthood ==
He was ordained a priest of Iringa Diocese on 13 July 2000. He served as priest until 28 January 2025. On 22 December 2023, Father Romanus Elamu Mihali was incardinated a priest of the Roman Catholic Diocese of Mafinga, the day that diocese was created by splitting it from Iringa Diocese.

He served in various roles and locations while a priest, including as:

- Assistant pastor at St. Paul the Apostle Parish, Ilula, Iringa Diocese from 2000 until 2003.
- Teacher and formator at St. Kizito Minor Seminary in Mafinga Diocese from 2003 until 2005.
- Assistant parish Priest at Virgin Mary of Fatima Parish, Usokami, Iringa Diocese from 2012 until 2015.
- Parish priest of Virgin Mary of the Assumption in Ujewa, Iringa Diocese from 2015 until 2024.
- Parish priest of Virgin Mary of the Assumption in Ujewa, Mafinga Diocese from 2024 until 2025.
- Episcopal vicar for the clergy, Mafinga Diocese from 2024 until 2025.
- Secretary for health of the Diocese of Mafinga from 2024 until 2025.

== As bishop ==
On 28 January 2025, Pope Francis accepted the resignation from the pastoral care of the diocese of Iringa, Tanzania, presented by Bishop Tarcisius Ngalalekumtwa. The Holy Father appointed Father Monsignor Romanus Elamu Mihali as new Bishop of the Diocese of Iringa. He was consecrated and installed at Iringa on 27 April 2025 by the hands of Cardinal Polycarp Pengo, Archbishop Emeritus of Dar-es-Salaam assisted by Bishop Tarcisius Ngalalekumtwa, Bishop Emeritus of Iringa and Archbishop Gervas John Mwasikwabhila Nyaisonga, Archbishop of Mbeya.

== See also ==
- Catholic Church in Tanzania

== Succession table ==
Catholic Church titles
Preceded by Tarcisius Ngalalekumtwa (21 November 1992 - 28 January 2025)	Bishop of Iringa (since 28 Jan 2025)	Succeeded by Incumbent
