= Vincent Cosmas Mwagala =

Tanzanian Catholic prelate

The Most Reverend Vincent Cosmas Mwagala
- Bishop of Mafinga
- Church: Catholic Church
- Archdiocese: Roman Catholic Archdiocese of Mbeya
- See: Mafinga
- Appointed: 22 December 2023
- Installed: 19 March 2024
- Predecessor: None
- Successor: Incumbent

Orders
- Ordination: 11 July 2007
- Consecration: 19 March 2024 by Protase Cardinal Rugambwa
- Rank: Bishop

Personal details
- Born: Vincent Cosmas Mwagala; 11 December 1973 (age 52) Makungu, Diocese of Iringa, Iringa Region, Tanzania

Styles of Vincent Cosmas Mwagala
- Reference style: Your Lordship; The Most Reverend
- Spoken style: His Lordship
- Religious style: Bishop

Vincent Cosmas Mwagala (born 11 December 1973) is a Tanzanian Catholic prelate who serves as the Bishop of the Roman Catholic Diocese of Mafinga. He was appointed bishop of Mafinga on 22 December 2023 by Pope Francis.

== Background and education ==
He was born on 11 December 1973, at Makungu, Diocese of Iringa, Iringa Region, Tanzania. He attended primary school in his home area. He studied at the Saint Augustine Major Seminary of Peramiho, in the archdiocese of Songea. He attended the Agrigento Archepiscopal Seminary of Agrigento, in Italy. He graduated with a Licentiate in pastoral theology from the Pontifical Theological Faculty of Sicily in Palermo, Italy.

== Priesthood ==
He was ordained a priest of the diocese of Iringa on 11 July 2007. He served in that capacity until 22 December 2023.

As priest, he served in several roles inside and outside his diocese including as:

- Deputy parish priest of San Gerlando Parish in Lampedusa from 2007 until 2011
- Parish priest of Our Lady of Fatima in Usokami, Iringa Region, Tanzania from 2011 until 2018
- Vicar for religious since 2015
- Vicar General of the diocese of Iringa since 2018.
- Parish priest of Virgin Mary Help of Christians in Ifunda since 2018.
- Member of the College of Consultors for Iringa Diocese since 2019.

== As bishop ==
On 22 December 2023, The Holy Father created the Roman Catholic Diocese of Mafinga by splitting it from the diocese of Iringa and making the new diocese a Suffragan of the Archdioceses of Mbeya. On the same day, Pope Francis appointed Monsignor Vincent Cosmas Mwagala to be the founder bishop of the new diocese.

The new bishop was consecrated and installed at the grounds of the Cathedral of the Assumption of the Blessed Virgin Mary, at Mafinga, Diocese of Mafinga, Tanzania on 19 March 2024. The Principal Consecrator was Protase Cardinal Rugambwa, Archbishop of Tabora assisted by Bishop Tarcisius Ngalalekumtwa, Bishop of Iringa and Archbishop Gervas John Mwasikwabhila Nyaisonga, Archbishop of Mbeya.

== See also ==
- Catholic Church in Tanzania

== Succession table ==
Catholic Church titles
Preceded by None (Diocese created on 22 December 2023)	Bishop of Mafinga (Since 22 December 2023)	Succeeded by Incumbent
