= Flavian Matindi Kassala =

Tanzanian Catholic prelate

The Most Reverend Flavian Matindi Kassala
- Bishop of Geita
- Church: Catholic Church
- Archdiocese: Roman Catholic Archdiocese of Mwanza
- See: Geita
- Appointed: 28 April 2016
- Installed: 12 June 2016
- Predecessor: Damian Denis Dallu
- Successor: Incumbent

Orders
- Ordination: 11 July 1999
- Consecration: 12 June 2016 by Jude Thaddaeus Ruwa'ichi

Personal details
- Born: Flavian Matindi Kassala; 4 December 1967 (age 58) Sumve, Diocese of Geita, Tanzania

Bishop Flavian Matindi Kassala (born 4 December 1967) is a Tanzanian Roman Catholic prelate who is the Bishop of the Roman Catholic Diocese of Geita, Tanzania. He was appointed bishop of Geita on 28 April 2016 by Pope Francis.

== Early life and education ==
He was born on 4 December 1967 in Sumve, in the Archdiocese of Mwanza, in Tanzania. He attended primary school and secondary school at St. Pius X Minor Seminary in Makoko, in the Diocese of Musoma. In 1988–89, he completed the equivalent of high school (A-Level) at the Minor Seminary of Sanu, in the Diocese of Mbulu. In 1991–92, he studied at Kome Preparatory Seminary, in the Diocese of Geita, for the one-year preparatory period.

He studied philosophy at the St. Anthony of Padua Major Seminary in Ntungamo, in the Diocese of Bukoba. He then transferred to St. Paul Major Seminary in Kipalapala, in the Archdiocese of Tabora, where he studied Theology. From 2004, he studied at the Pontifical Salesian University, in Rome, Italy. While there, he resided in the Pontifical Nepomucene College. He graduated in 2012 with a Doctor of Theology degree, with specialization in Youth Ministry and Catechesis.

== Priest ==
He was ordained priest of Geita on 11 July 1999 and as priest served in various roles until 28 April 2016, including as:

- Assistant priest in Sengerema Parish, Diocese of Geita from 1999 until 2002
- Formator and Spiritual Director of the Mary Queen of Apostles Minor Seminary in Sengerema from 2002 until 2004
- Director of the Pontifical Mission Societies for Geita Catholic Diocese from 2002 until 2004
- Coordinator of the Office of Episcopal Projects of the Diocese of Geita in 2013
- Professor and Director of St. Augustine University of Tanzania (SAUT) in Arusha, from 2013 until 2015
- Director of the Stella Maris Mtwara University College since 2015; a constituent college of St. Augustine Catholic University, Arusha.

== Bishop ==
On 28 April 2016 the Holy Father appointed him Bishop of the Diocese of Geita, Tanzania. He was consecrated and installed on 12 June 2016, outside the Roman Catholic Cathedral, Geita, in the Diocese of Geita. The Principal Consecrator was Archbishop Jude Thaddaeus Ruwa'ichi, Archbishop of Mwanza assisted by Archbishop Francisco Montecillo Padilla, Titular Archbishop of Nebbio and Bishop Renatus Leonard Nkwande, Bishop of Bunda

In October 2024, Bishop Flavian Matindi Kassala attended the assembly of the Catholic Synod of Bishops that concluded on 26 October in Rome. He and Archbishop Jude Thaddaeus Ruwa'ichi, of the Catholic Archdiocese of Dar es Salaam, represented Tanzania. Bishop Kassala recommends the translation and publication of the Synod Document, which was produced by 400 international delegates and was approved in its entirety by Pope Francis.

== See also ==
- Catholic Church in Tanzania

== Succession table ==
Catholic Church titles
Preceded by Damian Denis Dallu (14 April 2000 - 14 March 2014)	Bishop of Geita (since 28 April 2016)	Succeeded by Incumbent
