= Godfrey Jackson Mwasekaga =

Tanzanian Catholic prelate

The Most Reverend Godfrey Jackson Mwasekaga
- Auxiliary Bishop of Mbeya
- Church: Catholic Church
- Archdiocese: Roman Catholic Archdiocese of Mbeya
- See: Mbeya
- Appointed: 9 March 2024
- Installed: 26 May 2024

Orders
- Ordination: 14 Jul 2005
- Consecration: 26 May 2024 by Polycarp Cardinal Pengo
- Rank: Bishop

Personal details
- Born: Godfrey Jackson Mwasekaga; 7 March 1976 (age 49); Kyela, Diocese of Mbeya, Mbeya Region, Tanzania

Styles of Godfrey Jackson Mwasekaga
- Reference style: Your Lordship; The Most Reverend
- Spoken style: His Lordship
- Religious style: Bishop

Godfrey Jackson Mwasekaga (born 7 March 1976) is a Tanzanian Catholic prelate who serves as Auxiliary Bishop of the Roman Catholic Diocese of Mbeya. He was appointed auxiliary bishop of Mbeya on 9 March 2024 by Pope Francis. On the same day, he was appointed Titular Bishop of Thuburbo Minus.

== Background and education ==
He was born on 7 March 1976, at Kyela, Mbeya Region, Diocese of Mbeya, Tanzania. He attended primary and secondary schools in his home area. He studied at the Saint Augustin Major Seminary in Peramiho, Tanzania. Later, he graduated with a Licentiate of Sacred Theology from the St. Thomas Theological Institute in Messina, Italy. From 2008, he studied at the Pontifical Salesian University in Rome, graduating with a Doctorate in Theology in 2017.

== Priesthood ==
He was ordained a priest of the diocese of Mbeya on 14 July 2005. He served in that capacity until 9 March 2024.

As priest he served in various roles inside and outside of his diocese including as:

- Deputy parish priest of Saint Peter Claver in Mlowo from 2005 until 2008 and from 2017 until 2018
- Director of the Catechesis Office of the archdiocese of Mbeya since 2017
- Director of the Catechetical Training Center from 2006 until 2008
- Parish priest of Saint Peter Claver in Mlowo from 2018 until 2019
- Coordinator of liturgy in the archdiocese of Mbeya
- Vicar General of the archdiocese of Mbeya since 2019
- Parish priest of Saint Francis of Assisi Parish in Mwanjelwa, Tanzania.

== As bishop ==
He was appointed Auxiliary Bishop of the Roman Catholic Archdiocese of Mbeya, Tanzania on 9 March 2024. On the same day he was concurrently appointed Titular Bishop of Thuburbo Minus.

He was consecrated and installed at Sokoine Stadium, at Mbeya in the Archdiocese of Mbeya on 26 May 2024, at the hands of Polycarp Cardinal Pengo, Archbishop Emeritus of Dar-es-Salaam assisted by Archbishop Gervas John Mwasikwabhila Nyaisonga, Archbishop of Mbeya and Archbishop Jude Thaddaeus Ruwa'ichi, Archbishop of Dar-es-Salaam.

== See also ==
- Catholic Church in Tanzania

== Succession table ==
Catholic Church titles
Preceded by (Before 9 March 2024)	Auxiliary Bishop of Mbeya (Since 9 March 2024)	Succeeded by Incumbent
