= Magnus Mwalunyungu =

Tanzanian Catholic prelate (1930 - 2015)

The Most Reverend Magnus Mwalunyungu
- Bishop Emeritus of Tunduru-Masasi, Tanzania (Deceased)
- Church: Catholic Church
- Archdiocese: Roman Catholic Archdiocese of Songea
- See: Tunduru-Masasi
- Appointed: 30 March 1992
- Installed: 25 June 1992
- Term ended: 25 August 2005
- Predecessor: Polycarp Pengo
- Successor: Castor Paul Msemwa

Orders
- Ordination: 23 August 1959
- Consecration: 25 June 1992 by Laurean Cardinal Rugambwa
- Rank: Bishop

Personal details
- Born: Magnus Mwalunyungu; August 25, 1930 Nsengilindete, Tanzania
- Died: 13 February 2015 (aged 84) Tosamaganga Hospital in Iringa

Styles of Magnus Mwalunyungu
- Reference style: Your Lordship; The Most Reverend
- Spoken style: His Lordship
- Religious style: Bishop

Magnus Mwalunyungu (25 August 1930 - 13 February 2015) was a Roman Catholic prelate who served as the Bishop of the Roman Catholic Diocese of Tunduru-Masasi, Tanzania from 1992 until his retirement in 2005. He was appointed bishop on 30 March 1992 by Pope John Paul II. Bishop Magnus Mwalunyungu died on 13 February 2015 as Bishop Emeritus of Tunduru-Masasi, Tanzania at the age of 84 years.

== Background and education ==
He was born on 25 August 1930 at Nsengilindete. Tanzania. He studied philosophy and theology before he was ordained a priest on 23 August 1959.

== Priest ==
He was ordained priest on 23 August 1959. He served in that capacity until 30 March 1992.

== Bishop ==
On 30 March 1992 The Holy Father John Paul II appointed him bishop of the Roman Catholic Diocese of Tunduru–Masasi, Tanzania. He was consecrated and installed at the Diocesan Cathedral in Tunduru on 25 June 1992, by the hands of Laurean Cardinal Rugambwa, Archbishop of Dar-es-Salaam assisted by Archbishop Mario Epifanio Abdallah Mgulunde, Archbishop of Tabora and Bishop James Dominic Sangu, Bishop of Mbeya.

Bishop Magnus Mwalunyungu retired on 25 August 2005, having attained the retirement age of 75 years. He was succeeded that same day, by Bishop Castor Paul Msemwa as the Ordinary of the Diocese of Tunduru-Masasi. Bishop Mwalunyungu died on 13 February 2015 at Tosamaganga Hospital in Iringa as Bishop Emeritus of Tunduru-Masasi, Tanzania at the age of 84 years. He was buried at in the Tosamaganga Cathedral at Iringa on Friday, 20 February 2015.

== See also ==
- Catholic Church in Tanzania

== Succession table ==
Catholic Church titles
Preceded by Polycarp Pengo (17 October 1986 - 22 January 1990)	Bishop of Tunduru-Masasi (30 March 1992 - 25 August 2005)	Succeeded by Castor Paul Msemwa
