= Alfred Leonhard Maluma =

Tanzanian Roman Catholic bishop (1955–2021)

The Most Reverend Alfred Leonhard Maluma
- Bishop of Njombe (Deceased)
- Church: Catholic Church
- Archdiocese: Roman Catholic Archdiocese of Songea
- See: Njombe
- Appointed: 8 June 2002
- Installed: 1 September 2002
- Term ended: 6 April 2021
- Predecessor: Raymond Mwanyika
- Successor: Eusebio Samwel Kyando

Orders
- Ordination: 17 November 1985
- Consecration: 1 September 2002 by Polycarp Cardinal Pengo
- Rank: Bishop

Personal details
- Born: Alfred Leonhard Maluma; December 12, 1955; Lukani Village, Diocese of Iringa, Iringa Region, Tanzania
- Died: 6 April 2021 (aged 65); Muhimbili National Hospital, Dar es Salaam, Tanzania

Styles of Alfred Leonhard Maluma
- Reference style: Your Lordship; The Most Reverend
- Spoken style: His Lordship
- Religious style: Bishop

Alfred Leonhard Maluma (12 December 1955 – 6 April 2021) was a Tanzanian Roman Catholic prelate who was the Bishop of the Roman Catholic Diocese of Njombe, Tanzania. He was appointed bishop on 8 June 2002 by Pope John Paul II. Bishop Alfred Leonhard Maluma died on 6 April 2021, aged 65 years.

== Background and education ==
He was born on 12 December 1955 at Lukani Village, Iringa Diocese, Iringa Region in southwestern Tanzania.

== Priest ==
He was ordained a priest of the Diocese of Njombe on 17 November 1985. He served in that capacity until 8 June 2002.

== Bishop ==
He was appointed bishop of the Roman Catholic Diocese of Njombe, Tanzania on 8 June 2002 by Pope John Paul II. He was consecrated and installed on 1 September 2002 at Njombe by the hands of Polycarp Cardinal Pengo, Archbishop of Dar-es-Salaam assisted by Archbishop Norbert Wendelin Mtega, Archbishop of Songea and Bishop Emmanuel Alex Mapunda, Bishop of Mbinga.

== Illness and death ==
Bishop Alfred Leonhard Maluma was involved in an automobile accident on 20 March 2021 in the Dumila area, in Morogoro Region in central Tanzania. He was initially Hospitalized at Morogoro Regional Referral Hospital, where he was diagnosed with injury to his spinal cord. The bishop was referred to Muhimbili National Referral Hospital for further evaluation and management. He underwent spinal surgery at the Muhimbili Orthopaedic Institute (MOI). He continued with treatment and care at MOI, until his death on 6 April 2021.

== Legacy ==
Among the many good things that the late bishop did for his people included the following:

- He started an electricity project which supplied electricity in Njombe rural area for poor people.
- He established a water project that supplied water in the diocese of Njombe and in other areas in Tanzania.
- He started many diocesan schools, health centers and a hospital.

== See also ==
- Catholic Church in Tanzania

== Succession table ==
Catholic Church titles
| Preceded by Raymond Mwanyika (16 January 1971 - 8 June 2002) | Bishop of Njombe (8 June 2002 - 6 April 2021) | Succeeded by Eusebio Samwel Kyando (since 19 October 2023) |
