= Bruno Pius Ngonyani =

Tanzanian Catholic prelate (born 1945)

The Most Reverend Bruno Pius Ngonyani
- Bishop Emeritus of Lindi, Tanzania
- Church: Catholic Church
- Archdiocese: Roman Catholic Archdiocese of Songea
- See: Lindi
- Appointed: 6 October 1990
- Installed: 6 January 1991
- Term ended: 9 April 2022
- Predecessor: Maurus Libaba
- Successor: Wolfgang Pisa

Orders
- Ordination: 8 November 1974
- Consecration: 6 January 1991 by Pope John Paul II
- Rank: Bishop

Personal details
- Born: Bruno Pius Ngonyani; 8 August 1945 (age 79); Songea, Ruvuma Region, Tanzania

Styles of Bruno Pius Ngonyani
- Reference style: Your Lordship; The Most Reverend
- Spoken style: His Lordship
- Religious style: Bishop

Bruno Pius Ngonyani (born 8 August 1945) is a Tanzanian Catholic prelate who served as the Bishop of the Roman Catholic Diocese of Lindi, Tanzania from 1990 until his age-related retirement in 2022. He was appointed bishop of Lindi on 6 October 1990. He retired on 9 April 2022.

== Early life and priesthood ==
He was born on 8 August 1945. He studied philosophy and Theology and was then ordained a priest on 8 November 1974. He served as priest until 6 October 1990.

== As bishop ==
On 6 October 1990, Pope John Paul II appointed him as Bishop of the Roman Catholic Diocese of Lindi. On 6 January 1991, he was consecrated in St. Peter's Basilica in Rome, Italy by the hands of Pope John Paul II assisted by Archbishop Giovanni Battista Re, Titular Archbishop of Forum Novum and Archbishop Justin Francis Rigali, Titular Archbishop of Volsinium.

On 9 April 2022, Pope Francis accepted the age-related resignation from the pastoral care of Lindi Catholic Diocese presented by Bishop Bruno Pius Ngonyani. On the same day, The Holy Father appointed The Right Reverend Wolfgang Pisa as the new Catholic Bishop of Lindi Diocese. Bishop Bruno Pius Ngonyani lives on as the Bishop Emeritus of Lindi, Tanzania.

== See also ==
- Catholic Church in Tanzania

== Succession table ==
Catholic Church titles
| Preceded by Maurus Libaba (17 October 1986 - 3 March 1988) | Bishop of Lindi (6 October 1990 - 9 April 2022) | Succeeded by Wolfgang Pisa |
