= Diocese of Lindi =

The Diocese of Lindi may refer to either of two Roman Catholic Dioceses in Tanzania:

- The Roman Catholic Diocese of Lindi, created on October 17, 1986
- The Roman Catholic Archdiocese of Songea, known as the Diocese of Lindi from December 15, 1927, until December 23, 1931
