= St. Francis University College of Health and Allied Sciences =

Constituent college of St. Augustine University of Tanzania

Coordinates: 8°5′59″S 36°40′59″E

- Swahili: Chuo Kikuu Kishiriki cha Afya na Sayansi St. Francis
- Motto: Discipline. Diligence. Excellence.
- Type: Private
- Established: 2010; 16 years ago
- Affiliations: Tanzania Episcopal Conference
- Chairman: Rt. Rev Salutarius Libena
- Chancellor: Rt.Rev Wolfgang Pisa,O.F.M. Cap, President of TEC
- Principal: Prof. Albino Kalolo
- Academic staff: 71
- Administrative staff: 44
- Students: 1,605 ( 2025/2026)
- Location: Ifakara, Morogoro, Tanzania
- Campus: Urban
- Constituent college of: St. Augustine University of Tanzania
- Website: sfuchas.ac.tz

The St. Francis University College of Health and Allied Sciences (SFUCHAS) is a constituent college of St. Augustine University of Tanzania.

The college was established in 2010 by the Tanzania Episcopal Conference (TEC) based on the need of the Catholic Church to contribute to the training of more doctors and other Health Professionals in Tanzania. The college received provisional registration from the Tanzania Commission for Universities (TCU) on 2 November 2010.This was followed by full registration in September 2013 and official accreditation on November 7, 2025.

The college is the second Medical school after the former Weill Bugando in Mwanza, now Catholic University of Health and Allied Sciences (CUHAS) to be established and owned by the Catholic Bishops of Tanzania.

St. Francis University College of Health and Allied Sciences is located in Ifakara town; an administrative home of the Kilombero district, in Morogoro region lying 420 km South-West of Dar-s-Salaam and 230 km from Morogoro Town. It is the first medical school to be established in rural town of Tanzania.

The college offers the following academic programs for the time being:-

- Diploma in Medical Laboratory Sciences
- Diploma in Pharmaceutical Sciences
- Doctor of Medicine Degree (MD)

Future Programs to be offered:-

- Bachelor of Medical Laboratory Sciences
- Bachelor of Science in Nursing
- Bachelor of Pharmacy
- Doctor of Dental Surgery
- Master of Science in Public Health (MSPH)
- Master of Medicine (Obstetrics and Gynecology, Surgery, Pediatrics and Internal Medicine).
- MSc. Medical Microbiology/Immunology/ Parasitology / Entomology
