= Diocese of Njombe =

Diocese of the Catholic Church in Tanzania

Coordinates: 9.333333°S 34.766667°E

Diocese of Njombe Dioecesis Niombena

Location
- Country: Tanzania
- Metropolitan: Songea

Statistics
- Area: 20,860 km^{2} (8,050 sq mi)
- Population: Total; Catholics: (as of 2004); 659,506; 258,446 (39.2%)

Information
- Rite: Latin Rite

Current leadership
- Pope: Leo XIV
- Bishop: Eusebio Samwel Kyando
- Apostolic Administrator: John Chrisostom Ndimbo

The Roman Catholic Diocese of Njombe (Latin: Dioecesis Niombena) is a diocese located in Njombe in the ecclesiastical province of Songea in Tanzania.

== History ==
- February 16, 1968: Established as Diocese of Njombe from the Diocese of Iringa and Territorial Abbacy of Peramiho

== Leadership ==
Ordinaries

- Raymond Mwanyika (16 January 1971 – 8 June 2002)
- Alfred Leonhard Maluma (8 June 2002 – 6 April 2021)
- Eusebio Samwel Kyando (19 October 2023 – present)

Other priests of this diocese who became bishops

- Castor Paul Msemwa, appointed Coadjutor Bishop of Tunduru-Masasi in 2004
- Norbert Wendelin Mtega, appointed Bishop of Iringa in 1985

== See also ==
- Roman Catholicism in Tanzania

== Sources ==
- GCatholic.org
- Catholic Hierarchy
