= Castor Paul Msemwa =

Tanzanian Roman Catholic bishop (1955 - 2017)

The Most Reverend Castor Paul Msemwa
- Bishop of Tunduru-Masasi, Tanzania (Deceased)
- Church: Catholic Church
- Archdiocese: Roman Catholic Archdiocese of Songea
- See: Tunduru-Masasi
- Appointed: 7 December 2004
- Installed: 30 January 2005
- Term ended: 19 October 2017
- Predecessor: Magnus Mwalunyungu
- Successor: Filbert Felician Mhasi
- Other post(s): Coadjutor Bishop of the Roman Catholic Diocese of Tunduru-Masasi (7 December 2004 - 25 August 2005)

Orders
- Ordination: 7 June 1987
- Consecration: 30 January 2005 by Polycarp Cardinal Pengo
- Rank: Bishop

Personal details
- Born: Castor Paul Msemwa; May 13, 1955; Kitulira Village, Matola Parish, Diocese of Njombe, Njombe Region, Tanzania
- Died: 19 October 2017 (aged 62); Muscat, Oman

Styles of Castor Paul Msemwa
- Reference style: Your Lordship; The Most Reverend
- Spoken style: His Lordship
- Religious style: Bishop

Castor Paul Msemwa (13 February 1955 - 19 October 2017) was a Roman Catholic prelate who served as the Bishop of the Roman Catholic Diocese of Tunduru-Masasi, Tanzania from 2005 until his death in 2017. He served as Coadjutor Bishop of Tunduru-Masasi Diocese from December 2004 until August 2005. He was appointed bishop on 7 December 2004 by Pope John Paul II.

== Early life and education ==
He was born on 13 February 1955 at Kitulira Village, Matola Parish, Diocese of Njombe, Njombe Region, Tanzania. He studied philosophy and theology at Tanzanian seminaries and was ordained a priest in 1987.

== Priest ==
He was ordained a priest of the Diocese of Njombe on 7 June 1987. He served in that capacity until 7 December 2004.

== Bishop ==
Pope John Paul II appointed him Coadjutor Bishop of the Roman Catholic Diocese of Tunduru–Masasi on 7 December 2004. He was consecrated and installed at the Diocesan Cathedral at Tunduru, in the Diocese of Tunduru-Masasi on 30 January 2005. He was consecrated by the hands of Polycarp Cardinal Pengo, Archbishop of Dar-es-Salaam assisted by Archbishop Norbert Wendelin Mtega, Archbishop of Songea and Bishop Magnus Mwalunyungu, Bishop of Tunduru-Masasi. On 25 August 2005, upon the age-related retirement of Bishop Magnus Mwalunyungu and Ordinary, Bishop Castor Paul Msemwa succeeded as bishop of Tunduru-Masasi, Tanzania.

== Illness and death ==
For approximately two years before his death, Bishop Msemwa developed health issues for which he received medical care both inside and outside Tanzania. On Wednesday, 18 October 2017 he left Tanzania and travelled to India to seek medical evaluation and treatment. The next day, Thursday, 19 October 2017 he died in Muscat, Oman, while in transit to India to seek medical treatment. He was 62 years 8 months old.

== See also ==
- Catholic Church in Tanzania

== Succession table ==
Catholic Church titles
Preceded by	Coadjutor Bishop of Tunduru-Masasi (7 December 2004 - 25 August 2005)	Succeeded by
Preceded by Magnus Mwalunyungu (30 March 1992 - 25 August 2005)	Bishop of Tunduru-Masasi (25 August 2005 - 19 October 2017)	Succeeded by Filbert Felician Mhasi
