= James Joseph Komba =

Tanzanian Roman Catholic prelate (1922–1992)

The Most Reverend James Joseph Komba
- Archbishop of Songea, Tanzania (Deceased)
- Church: Catholic Church
- Archdiocese: Roman Catholic Archdiocese of Songea
- See: Songea
- Appointed: 18 November 1987
- Installed: 18 November 1987
- Term ended: 1 February 1992
- Predecessor: Eberhard Spiess
- Successor: Norbert Wendelin Mtega
- Other posts: Auxiliary Bishop of Peramiho (22 December 1961 - 6 February 1969); Bishop of Songea (6 February 1969 - 18 November 1987)

Orders
- Ordination: 15 July 1954
- Consecration: 3 May 1962 by Guido Del Mestri
- Rank: Bishop

Personal details
- Born: James Joseph Komba; May 1, 1922 Lituhi, Ruvuma Region, Tanzania
- Died: 1 February 1992 (aged 69)

Styles of Stephano Lameck Musomba
- Reference style: Your Lordship; The Most Reverend
- Spoken style: His Lordship
- Religious style: Bishop

James Joseph Komba (1 May 1922 - 1 February 1992) was a Tanzanian Roman Catholic prelate who was the Archbishop of the Roman Catholic Archdiocese of Songea, Tanzania from November 1987 until his death in May 1992. Before that, from February 1969 until November 1987, he was the Bishop of the Roman Catholic Diocese of Songea. He was Auxiliary Bishop of the Territorial Abbey of Peramiho from 22 December 1961 until 6 February 1969. During that time, he served concurrently as Titular Bishop of Thignica. He was appointed bishop by Pope John XXIII on 22 December 1961. He was consecrated and installed at Peramiho on 3 May 1962. He died in office as Archbishop of Songea on 1 February 1992, three months shy of his 70th birthday.

== Background and education ==
He was born in May 1922 in Lituhi Village, Ruvuma Region, in the Apostolic Prefecture of Lindi, Tanzania. He studied philosophy and theology before he was ordained priest in July 1954.

== Priest ==
He was ordained a priest of the Roman Catholic Diocese of Peramiho, Tanzania on 15 July 1954. He served in that capacity until 22 December 1961.

== Bishop ==
On 7 July 2021 he was appointed Titular Bishop of Thignica and Auxiliary of Peramiho (now Songea) on 22 December 1961 by Pope John XXIII. On 3 May 1962, he was consecrated and installed at the Abbey in Peramiho Tanzania by the hands of Archbishop Guido Del Mestri, Titular Archbishop of Tuscamia assisted by Bishop Antoon van Oorschoot, Bishop of Mbeya and Bishop Eberhard (Hermann) Spiess, Titular Bishop of Cemerinianus.

On 6 February 1969, the Holy Father elevated the Territorial Abbey of Peramiho to the Roman Catholic Diocese of Songea. Bishop James Joseph Komba, previously the Auxiliary there succeeded there the same day. On 18 November 1987 the diocese was elevated to an archdiocese. His Holiness John Paul II appointed Bishop James Joseph Komba and pioneer Archbishop of the newly created archdiocese. He died in office on 1 February 1992 at the age of 69 years.

While bishop Songea, he attended the Second Vatican Council, Session One, the Second Vatican Council, Session Three and the Second Vatican Council, Session Four as Council Father in all three sessions.

== See also ==
- Catholic Church in Tanzania

== Succession table ==
Catholic Church titles
Preceded by	Auxiliary Bishop of Peramiho; 22 December 1961 - 6 February 1969	Succeeded by
Preceded by Diocese created	Bishop of Songea (6 February 1969 - 18 November 1987)	Succeeded by Diocese elevated
Preceded by Archdiocese created	Archbishop of Songea (18 November 1987 - 1 Feb 1992)	Succeeded by Norbert Wendelin Mtega (6 July 1992 - 15 May 2013)
