= Ruaha University College =

Coordinates: 7°46′34″S 35°41′48″E

Ruaha Catholic University
- Swahili: Chuo Kikuu cha Ruaha
- Type: Private
- Established: 2005
- Affiliations: Tanzania Episcopal Conference
- Chairman: Rt. Rev. Tarcisius Ngalalekumtwa
- Location: Iringa, Tanzania
- Campus: Urban
- Constituent college of: St. Augustine University of Tanzania
- Website: ruco.ac.tz

Ruaha University College (RUCO) is a constituent college of St. Augustine University of Tanzania (SAUT). The college was established by the Tanzania Episcopal Conference under its Trust Deed of the Registered Trustees of Ruaha University College who are the trustees of SAUT, through the monetary support of persons within and outside the country.

The college is governed and administered in accordance with the Catholic Church Policy on Higher Education Institutions - Excorde Ecclesiae and the provisions of the constitution establishing constituent college of SAUT.

Nonetheless, the college is a private and secular institution of higher learning that is open to all regardless of their faiths or religious affiliations. It does not discriminate based on race, ethnicity, gender, disability, or caste.

== Location ==
The college is in the Iringa municipality along Uhuru Avenue on the Great North Road to Dodoma, at what used to be Dr. Amon J. Nsekela Bankers' Academy, in the Wilolesi area.

== Academic programmes ==
The Faculty of Information and Communication Technology offers a three-year undergraduate programme leading to the bachelor of science in computer science, two-year diploma in computer science and one-year certificate programme leading to certificate in computer science.

The Faculty of Law offers a four-year undergraduate programme leading to bachelor of laws.

The Faculty of Arts and Social Sciences is offering a three-year bachelor of arts in education (for English/Kiswahili teachers).

The Institute of Allied Health Sciences offers a three-year diploma in medical laboratory sciences, a three-year diploma in pharmaceutical sciences, and a one-year certificate in pharmaceutical sciences.

The Directorate of Short Courses and Continuing Education offers diversified short courses that are recognized nationally and internationally. It also offers training and maintenance services to the general public.
