= Diocese of Mafinga =

Catholic diocese in Tanzania

Diocese of Mafinga Dioecesis Mafingensis

Location
- Country: Tanzania
- Metropolitan: Mbeya

Statistics
- Area: 11,016 km^{2} (4,253 sq mi)
- Population: Total; Catholics: (as of 2023); 617,770; 236,299
- Parishes: 17

Information
- Sui iuris church: Latin Church
- Rite: Roman Rite
- Established: December 22, 2023

Current leadership
- Pope: Leo XIV
- Bishop: Vincent Cosmas Mwagala

The Roman Catholic Diocese of Mafinga (Latin: Dioecesis Mafingensis; Swahili: Jimbo Katoliki Mafinga) is a diocese located in Mafinga in the ecclesiastical province of Mbeya in Tanzania.

== History ==
The Diocese of Mafinga was erected by Pope Francis from the Diocese of Iringa on December 22, 2023, and Vincent Cosmas Mwagala was named the first ordinary. The diocese was canonically inaugurated by Angelo Accattino in the evening before Saint Joseph's Day. The following day, March 19, 2024, Mwagala received episcopal consecration and became the diocese's first bishop.

== Bishops ==
=== Ordinary ===
1. Vincent Cosmas Mwagala (2023 – present)

=== Diocesan priests who became bishops ===
- Romanus Elamu Mihal, appointed Bishop of Iringa in 2025
