= Jordan University College =

Coordinates: 6°48′20″S 37°40′9″E

- Swahili: Chuo Kikuu Kishiriki cha Jordan
- Former names: Salvatorian Major Seminary; Salvatorian Institute of Philosophy and Theology
- Motto: Fundisheni Mataifa Yote - Teach all nations (Matt 28:19)
- Motto in English: Teach All Nations
- Type: Private
- Established: 2010
- Affiliations: Tanzania Episcopal Conference
- Chairman: Rev. Africanus Lokilo
- Principal: Prof. Bertram B. B. Mapunda
- Students: 1,995 (April 2013)
- Location: Morogoro, Morogoro, Tanzania
- Campus: Urban
- Constituent college of: St. Augustine University of Tanzania
- Website: www.juco.ac.tz

The Jordan University College (JUCO) is a constituent college of St. Augustine University of Tanzania in Morogoro, Tanzania.

== History ==
The religious Superiors of the congregations working in Tanzania agreed early on with the Salvatorian Mission Superior, Fr. Andrew Urbanski, SDS, that there was need for an institution of higher education for their religious members - especially for those who felt a calling to the presbyteral ministry. To the great satisfaction of all concerned, preparations for such an institution began at Kola, in the town of Morogoro in Tanzania. Discussions concerning this project were initiated at the annual meeting of the Religious Superiors Association in Tanzania (RSAT) in 1988. Some time later it was decided that there was a need to have both a Philosophical and a Theological Department at the proposed institution.

On December 11, 1990 the Mission Chapter of the Salvatorian Mission in Tanzania agreed to work towards the organization of the Salvatorian Major Seminary in both philosophy and theology. It was decided that the Seminary's patron would be the Founder of the Salvatorians, Fr. Francis Mary of the Cross Jordan. Permission was obtained by the Salvatorians in Tanzania to sponsor the project. Bishop Adrian Mkoba, Ordinary of the Morogoro Diocese (on February 22, 1988), and Archbishop Anthony Mayala, then Chairman of the Tanzania Episcopal Conference (in his letter of March 2 of that year) on behalf of the Conference, gave the respective nihil obstat and their blessings.

On September 2, 1990 Pope John Paul II blessed the cornerstone of this Seminary at his meeting with the clergy and religious, during his pastoral visit in St. Peter's Church, Dar es Salaam. The new Mission Superior of the Salvatorians in Tanzania, Fr. Zdzislaw Tracz, SDS, became responsible for implementing the plan. He contacted Swiss architect Herbert Kramel of the University of Zurich in Switzerland for the design of the buildings. With the Italo-Tanzanian Construction Firm, Coastal Steel, he arranged for construction to begin in 1991 at Morogoro-Kola.

Progress on the building of the Seminary advanced to a point where, by mid-1993, facilities became available for the opening of classes on August 16, for the first of the three-year philosophy program. The initial staff of six lecturers consisted of members from the Holy Ghost Missionaries, the Consolata Fathers, the Salvatorians, and one lay professor who came midway into the second year. These instructors hailed from Tanzania, Mozambique, Holland, Poland and the United States of America. The original twenty-five students represented five religious orders.

In the second year, another twenty-one students came to start their studies in philosophy. Projections indicated that each year there would be about twenty to twenty-five newcomers for the three-year philosophy program.

By 1995 the student enrolment had increased to eighty, representing nine religious congregations. The Salvatorian Major Seminary also accepted members of Religious Orders beginning their first year of Theology. In the same year the Salvatorian Major Seminary had received official affiliation with the Philosophy Faculty of the Pontifical Urbaniana University of Rome. Official recognition of this status was given on July 6, (Decree #932/95/2).

By 1998 the number of students had increased to one hundred and seventy, representing fifteen religious congregations. The academic staff had grown to twenty-four members, from twelve Religious Congregations, and three lay teachers.

On January 26, 1999 With decree #164/99 the Salvatorian Major Seminary was affiliated with the Theology Faculty of the same university. At the same time, the authority of the Seminary together with the Generalate of the Society of the Divine Saviour addressed a request to the proper Ecclesiastical Authorities to change the name of the institution from the Salvatorian Major Seminary to the Salvatorian Institute of Philosophy and Theology. The Congregations of Evangelization and Christian Education together with the Pontifical University Urbaniana approved this change on April 21, 1999.

On April 16, 2010 the General Council of the Society of the Divine Saviour resolved to transform the Salvatorian Institute into a constituent college of St. Augustine University of Tanzania with the name of Jordan University College. On November 2, 2010 the College received from The Tanzania Commission for Universities (TCU) the Certificate of Provisional Registration.

The Institution was led by Fr. David Brusky, SDS, the first rector of the Seminary (1993-1996), Fr. Stanislaw Golus, SDS was the second rector in the transition from the Seminary to the Institute (1996-1999), the third rector was Fr. Julian Bednarz, SDS (1999-2005), and the last rector of the Institute was Fr. Bernard Witek, SDS (2005-2010) who continues to lead the Institution as the first principal (2010- ).

== Mission ==
JUCO's stated purpose is to create and expand opportunities for higher education in Tanzania and beyond by offering degree and non-degree programmes.

== Vision ==
JUCO states that it intends to provide higher education geared towards preparing African scholars and leaders.

== Objectives ==
The transformation of the Salvatorian Institute seminary oriented into Jordan University College as an open higher learning institution had as objectives: to contribute more effectively to the local church by preparing candidates to the priesthood and, in view of the Tanzania Development Vision 2025, to offer academic programmes designed to solve problems of society and contribute to the development of the country.
