= Emmanuel Alex Mapunda =

Tanzanian Roman Catholic bishop (1935–2019)

The Most Reverend Emmanuel Alex Mapunda
- Bishop of Mbinga
- Church: Catholic Church
- Archdiocese: Roman Catholic Archdiocese of Songea
- See: Mbinga
- Appointed: 22 December 1986
- Installed: 6 January 1987
- Predecessor: None
- Successor: John Chrisostom Ndimbo

Orders
- Ordination: 8 August 1965
- Consecration: 6 January 1987 by Pope John Paul II
- Rank: Bishop

Personal details
- Born: Emmanuel Alex Mapunda; December 10, 1935; Parangu, Archdiocese of Songea, Ruvuma Region, Tanzania
- Died: 16 May 2019 (aged 83)

Styles of Emmanuel Alex Mapunda
- Reference style: Your Lordship; The Most Reverend
- Spoken style: His Lordship
- Religious style: Bishop

Emmanuel Alex Mapunda (10 December 1935 – 16 May 2019) was a Tanzanian Roman Catholic prelate. He was the founder bishop of the Roman Catholic Diocese of Mbinga, in the Metropolitan Archdiocese of Songea. He was appointed to that post in 1986. He served there until his age-related retirement in 2011. He died on 16 May 2019 at the age of 83 years.

== Early life and education ==
He was born in Parangu, in the Archdiocese of Songea, in Ruvuma Region, Tanzania. He was baptized on 15 December 1935. He studied philosophy at the St. Augustine's Major Seminary in Peramiho from 1957 until 1959. He then studied Theology at the same seminary until 1965.

== Priest ==
On 8 August 1965, he was ordained a priest of Songea, Tanzania by Bishop James Joseph Komba. He served in that capacity until 24 December 1986.

== Bishop ==
He was appointed Bishop of the Roman Catholic Diocese of Mbinga on 22 December 1986. On the same day, the Diocese of Mbinga was created as a Suffragan of the Metropolitan Ecclesiastic Province of Songea. He was consecrated on 6 January 1987 by the hands of Pope John Paul II at Saint Peter's Basilica in Rome, Italy. The Holly Father was assisted by Archbishop Eduardo Martínez Somalo, Titular Archbishop of Thagora and Archbishop José Tomás Sánchez, Archbishop Emeritus of Nueva Segovia. He was then Installed at St. Aloyce Gonzaga Cathedral at Mbinga on 15 March 1987. On 12 March 2011, Pope Benedict XVI accepted the age-related resignation of Bishop Emmanuel Alex Mapunda from serving as Bishop of Mbinga. Bishop John Chrisostom Ndimbo was appointed as his successor.

== Illness and death ==
Bishop Emmanuel Alex Mapunda fell ill at his residence at Nangombo Parish, Mbinga Diocese on 11 May 2019. On 16 May 2019, his doctors decided to transfer him to Muhimbili National Hospital in Dar es Salaam for better evaluation and management. He died on 16 May 2019 while on an airplane transporting him from Mbinga to Dar es Salaam. He was 83 years old. He was buried on 24 May 2019 inside the Cathedral of Saint Killian, which the bishop helped to build.

== See also ==
- Catholic Church in Tanzania

== Succession table ==
Catholic Church titles
Preceded by None (Diocese created 22 December 1986)	Bishop of Mbinga (22 December 1986 - 12 March 2011)	Succeeded by John Chrisostom Ndimbo (12 March 2011 - present)
