= Nunzio Sulprizio =

Italian Roman Catholic saint and layman

Saint Nunzio Sulprizio

Layman
- Born: 13 April 1817; Pescosansonesco, Pescara, Kingdom of the Two Sicilies
- Died: 5 May 1836 (aged 19); Naples, Kingdom of the Two Sicilies
- Resting place: Chiesa di San Domenico Soriano
- Venerated in: Roman Catholic Church
- Beatified: 1 December 1963, Saint Peter's Basilica, Vatican City by Pope Paul VI
- Canonized: 14 October 2018, Saint Peter's Square, Vatican City by Pope Francis
- Feast: 5 May
- Attributes: Rosary; Anvil
- Patronage: The disabled; Blacksmiths; Workers; Pescosansonesco

Nunzio Sulprizio (13 April 1817 – 5 May 1836) was an Italian Roman Catholic from Pescara who worked as an apprentice blacksmith. He suffered from poor health during his brief life and was considered to those who knew him to be a gentle and pious individual.

Sulprizio was beatified in late 1963 after the recognition of two miracles (direct healings) attributed to his intercession. Pope Francis confirmed his canonization on 8 June 2018 after the confirmation of a second miracle and Sulprizio was canonized on 14 October 2018.

== Life ==
Nunzio Sulprizio was born on 13 April 1817 to Domenico Sulprizio (who was born in Popoli) and Rosa Luciani just after Easter; he was named after his paternal grandfather Nunzio who died on 8 September 1803. His parents had married on 28 May 1816 and he himself was born during a time of great famine. He was baptized before sunset mere hours after his birth. His parents took him to the Bishop of Sulmona Francesco Tiberi on 16 May 1820 so he could receive his Confirmation in the faith.

His father died on 31 July 1820 and his mother remarried in 1822 for financial support to a much older man; his little sister Domenica died just months after their father on 7 December 1820. His stepfather viewed Sulprizio with little more than harshness and contempt. The relationship between the two was nonexistent and Sulprizio bonded more with his mother and maternal grandmother. During this period he attended the school in Corvara that the priest De Fabiis managed. It was around this time he also started to attend school that a local priest ran where he learned to read and to write. In his childhood he took the time to attend Mass and come to know Jesus Christ but also to follow His example and that of the saints.

His mother died on 5 March 1823 and he and was sent to live with his maternal grandmother Anna Rosaria Luciani del Rossi who was illiterate but firm in the faith. The two often took walks together and attended Mass on a regular basis. He also began to attend the school for poor students that Father Fantacci managed; his grandmother later died on 4 April 1826. It was following this that his uncle - Domenico Luciani (often called "Mingo") - took him on as an apprentice blacksmith. His uncle was harsh on him and often left him without proper nourishment and did not feed him if he perceived that Sulprizio needed either discipline or correction. He sent Sulprizio to run errands regardless of the distance which put a great strain upon him. He was also beaten or cursed if his uncle did not like how he did his errands. The work was too much for him due to his age and he contracted a disease in 1831. This occurred one winter morning when his uncle sent him to the slopes of Rocca Tagliata for supplies. That evening he became exhausted and had a swollen leg and a burning fever forcing him to bed. He did not mention this to his uncle though the next morning found he could no longer stand. His uncle was indifferent to his suffering. His condition was later diagnosed as gangrene in one leg. He was hospitalized first in L'Aquila between April and June and then in Naples. Despite his pain he dealt with it with patience and his offering his pain to God.

During his illness at home he needed to clean his sore on a constant basis since it oozed puss. There was one occasion where he went to a stream close to home to clean his wound but a woman who came to wash her clothes chased him off after telling him that he would pollute the water. Instead he found another stream and was able to recite several rosaries as he let the water clean his sore.

The hospitalized Sulprizio later met his paternal uncle - Francesco Sulprizio (a soldier) - who introduced him to a fellow soldier: Colonel Felice Wochinger. His uncle introduced him to that colonel in 1832. The two's relationship soon grew until it became that of father and son. Gaetano Errico - future saint - promised him that he would admit him into his religious order when the time was right. On 20 June 1832 he entered the Hospital of the Incurables to seek further treatment with the colonel providing for all his needs during this time. He also prepared for his First Communion during this time and was enthusiastic about receiving it earlier despite the fact that rules dictated that he had to be fifteen. He also went to spa treatments on the island of Ischia and was able to abandon crutches in favor of a simple walking stick.

In 1835 the doctors decided to amputate his leg as their sole option but his pain continued. His situation worsened in March 1836 and his suffering increased when his fever increased. He continued to place his trust in God and was well aware of the fact that the end was near. Two months later on the date of his death he asked for a crucifix to be brought to him before summoning his confessor and to receive the sacraments for the last time. He died in 1836 due to the disease he contracted. His remains are now located in the Church of San Domenico Soriano in Naples. Decades after his death Pope Leo XIII proposed Sulprizio as a model for workers.

== Sainthood ==
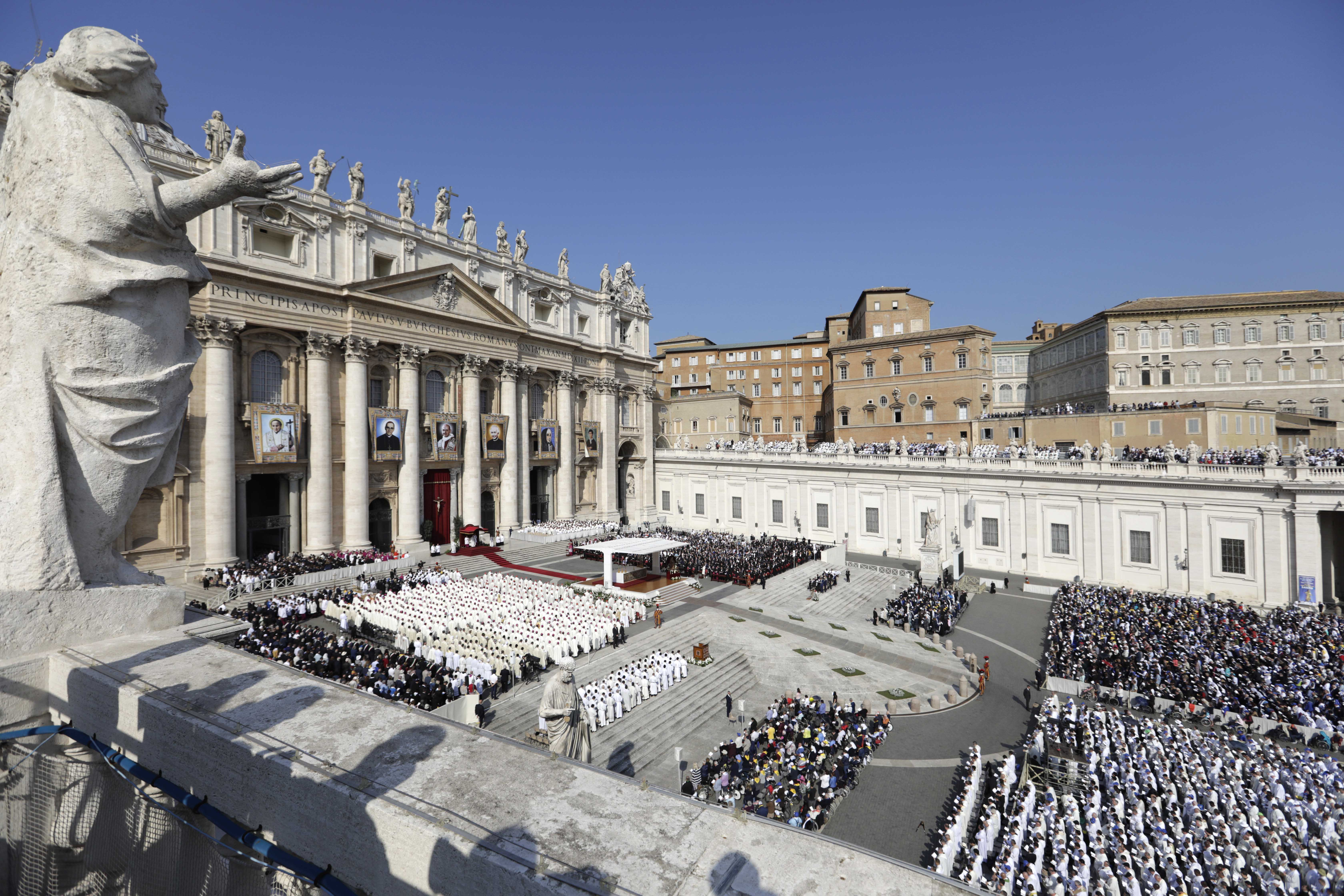
Sulprizio's canonization in 2018.

The beatification process opened in both Naples and Pescara-Penne in an informative process that was launched on 3 July 1843 and which later concluded over a decade later on 5 September 1856. Pope Pius IX officially opened the cause on 9 July 1859, granting Sulprizio the title of Servant of God. Theologians later approved his writings being in line with official Church doctrine on 7 September 1871 while the Congregation for Rites validated the informative phase sometime later on 20 September 1877. In September 1884 an antepreparatory committee met to discuss the cause as did a preparatory one in October 1889 and a last general committee on 6 February 1891. The successful conclusion of these processes meant that the cause could be taken to the pope for his final approval. He was proclaimed to be Venerable on 21 July 1891 after Pope Leo XIII confirmed that Sulprizio had lived a model life of heroic virtue. Leo XIII proposed Sulprizio as an appropriate model for workers of all ages.

The two miracles required for his beatification (or healings that came after petitions for his intercession) were investigated in their dioceses of origin. It was then subject to further investigation at the C.O.R. whose preparatory committee approved the miracle on 8 January 1963 as did a general one on 5 March; Pope John XXIII later approved the beatification just before his death and therefore could not celebrate the beatification. His successor Pope Paul VI beatified him on 1 December 1963 in Saint Peter's Basilica.

The miracle required for his canonization was investigated in Taranto and Archbishop Filippo Santoro placed the case under diocesan examination in a process that spanned from 19 June 2015 until 11 July 2016. Following this process the documentation gathered was sent to the Congregation for the Causes of Saints in Rome for additional medical and theological examination. The C.C.S. approved this miracle at their meeting held on 5 June 2018. Pope Francis confirmed this miracle on 8 June and confirmed that Sulprizio would be canonized on 14 October 2018.

=== Canonization miracle ===
The miracle that led to his canonization concerned a man who was injured in a motorbike accident who fell into a coma. One relic of Sulprizio was - at the request of his relations - placed in his hospital room. Almost a week later his parents were told he had made remarkable progress, and had awakened from his coma and not in a vegetative state as was believed.
