= Evaristo Marc Chengula =

Tanzanian Roman Catholic bishop (1941–2018)

Evaristo Marc Chengula I.M.C.
- Bishop of Mbeya
- Church: Catholic Church
- Diocese: Diocese of Mbeya
- In office: 8 November 1996 – 21 November 2018
- Predecessor: James Dominic Sangu
- Successor: Gervas John Mwasikwabhila Nyaisonga

Orders
- Ordination: 15 October 1970
- Consecration: 2 February 1997 by Norbert Wendelin Mtega

Personal details
- Born: 1 January 1941 Mdabulo (in eastern present-day Mufindi District), Mandatory Tanganyika Territory, British Empire
- Died: 21 November 2018 (aged 77)

Evaristo Marc Chengula (1 January 1941 – 21 November 2018) was a Tanzanian Roman Catholic bishop from the congregation of the Consolata Missionaries.

== Biography ==
Chengula was born in Tanzania and was ordained to the priesthood in 1970. He served as bishop of the Roman Catholic Diocese of Mbeya from 1997 until his death in 2018.
