= Archbishop Mihayo University College of Tabora =

College in Tabora, Tanzania

Coordinates: 5°1′8″S 32°48′43″E

- Swahili: Chuo Kikuu Kishiriki cha Askofu mkuu Mihayo Tabora
- Motto: Seeking Wisdom in Truth
- Type: Private
- Established: 2010
- Affiliations: Tanzania Episcopal Conference
- Chairman: Most Rev. Paul Ruzoka
- Principal: Rev. Fr. Juvenalis Asantemungu
- Students: 886 (2010/11)
- Location: Tabora, Tanzania
- Campus: Urban
- Constituent college of: St. Augustine University of Tanzania
- Website: amucta.ac.tz

The Archbishop Mihayo University College of Tabora (AMUCTA) is a constituent college of St. Augustine University of Tabora, Tanzania.
