= Eusebius Alfred Nzigilwa =

Tanzanian Catholic prelate

The Most Reverend Eusebius Alfred Nzigilwa
- Bishop of Mpanda
- Church: Catholic Church
- Archdiocese: Roman Catholic Archdiocese of Tabora
- See: Mpanda
- Appointed: 13 May 2020
- Installed: 2 August 2020
- Predecessor: Gervas John Mwasikwabhila Nyaisonga
- Successor: Incumbent
- Previous post: Auxiliary Bishop of Dar es Salaam (28 January 2010 - 13 May 2020)

Orders
- Ordination: 23 June 1995 by Archbishop Polycarp Pengo
- Consecration: 19 March 2010 by Polycarp Cardinal Pengo

Personal details
- Born: Eusebius Alfred Nzigilwa; 14 August 1966 (age 60) Mwanza, Diocese of Mwanza, Tanzania

Eusebius Alfred Nzigilwa (born 14 August 1966) is a Tanzanian Roman Catholic prelate who is the Bishop of the Roman Catholic Diocese of Mpanda, Tanzania. He was appointed bishop of Mpanda on 13 May 2020. He previously worked as Auxiliary Bishop of Dar es Salaam from 2010 until 2020. He was appointed bishop on 28 January 2010 by Pope Benedict XVI.

== Early life and education ==
He was born on 14 August 1966 in Mwanza, in the Catholic Diocese of Mwanza, in the Mwanza Region, in northern Tanzania. He studied at St. Peter's Junior Seminary in Morogoro, for his elementary and secondary education. In 1988 he entered the Kibosho Seminary, in Moshi, having taken off one year for military service. He studied philosophy at Kibosho. In 1990 he transferred to Kipalapala Major Seminary, in Tabora, where studied Theology.

In 1999 he entered the University of Dar-es-Salaam (UDSM), graduating from there with a bachelor's degree in education in 2003. He returned to the UDSM in 2008 to pursue a master's degree in education.

== Priest ==
He was ordained priest of Dar es Salaam on 23 June 1995 by Archbishop Polycarp Pengo, Archbishop of Dar-es-Salaam. He served in that role until 28 January 2010.

As a priest, he served in many roles including as:

- Formator in the Archdiocesan formation house of Kunduchi, Mtongoni from 1995 until 1996
- Diocesan director of the Holy Childhood Association from 1996 until 1997
- Rector of St. Mary's Minor Seminary in Visiga, Archdiocese of Dar-es-Salaam, from 1997 until 1999 and from 2003 until 2008.

== Bishop ==
On 28 January 2010 the Holy Father appointed him Auxiliary Bishop of the Archdiocese of Dar es Salaam, Tanzania. He was contemporaneously appointed Titular Bishop of Mozotcori.

He was consecrated and installed on 19 March 2010 in Dar es Salaam. The Principal Consecrator was Archbishop Polycarp Cardinal Pengo, Archbishop of Dar-es-Salaam assisted by Bishop Jude Thaddaeus Ruwa'ichi, Bishop of Dodoma and Bishop Almachius Vincent Rweyongeza, Bishop of Kayanga.

On 13 May 2020, Pope Francis appointed him the new Bishop of the Roman Catholic Diocese of Mpanda. He was installed there on 2 August 2020. He succeeded Gervas John Mwasikwabhila Nyaisonga, who had moved to Mbeya as Archbishop.

== See also ==
- Catholic Church in Tanzania

== Succession table ==
Catholic Church titles
| Preceded by | Auxiliary Bishop of Der es Salaam (28 January 2010 - 13 May 2020) | Succeeded by |
| Preceded by Gervas John Mwasikwabhila Nyaisonga (17 February 2014 - 21 December 2018) | Bishop of Mpanda (since 13 May 2020) | Succeeded by Incumbent |
