= Mwenge Catholic University =

University

Coordinates: 3°18′7″S 37°19′24″E

- Swahili: Chuo Kikuu Cha Kikatoliki cha Mwenge
- Mwenge Catholic University Logo
- Former names: St. Joseph's Teachers College; Mwenge University College of Education
- Motto: Lux Mundi (Latin); Mwanga wa Dunia (Swahili)
- Motto in English: Light of the World
- Type: Private
- Established: 2005; 21 years ago
- Affiliations: Tanzania Episcopal Conference
- Chairman: Archbishop Isaac Amani
- Chancellor: Archbishop Gervas Nyaisonga
- Vice-Chancellor: Rev. Prof. Philbert Vumilia
- Postgraduates: Dr. Paschal Wambiaya
- Location: Moshi, Tanzania
- Campus: Urban
- Constituent college of: St. Augustine University of Tanzania
- Website: mwecau.ac.tz

The Mwenge Catholic University (MWECAU), formerly Mwenge University College of Education (MWUCE), is a university which is under the Tanzania Episcopal Conference of the Roman Catholic Church, located in Moshi, Tanzania.

== History ==
It was founded as St. Joseph's Teachers College. As Mwenge University College of Education, it was a constituent college of St. Augustine University of Tanzania. currently MWECAU has more than 4000 students pursuing various programmes ranging from Certificates to PhD. This includes:- 1. Doctor of Philosophy in Education (3 years 2. Master of Education (2 years) 3. Master of Business Administration (2 Years) 4. Postgraduate Diploma in Education (1 Year) 5. Bachelor of Education in Science (3 years) 6. Bachelor of Education in Arts (3 years) 7. Bachelor of Geography and Environmental Studies (3 years) 8. Bachelor of Science in Mathematics and Statistics (3 years) 9. Bachelor of Sociology and Social Work (3 years) 10. Bachelor of Business Administration (3 years) 11. Bachelor of Philosophy with Ethics (3 years) 12. Certificate and Diploma in Accountancy (3 years) 13. Certificate and Diploma in Business Administration (3 years) 14. Certificate and Diploma in Information and Communication Technology (3 years) 15. Certificate and Diploma in Laboratory Technology (3 years) 16. Certificate and Diploma in Library (3 years) 17. Certificate and Diploma in Procurement Management (3 years) 18. Certificate and Diploma in Law (3 years)
