= Raymond Mwanyika =

Tanzanian Roman Catholic bishop

- Bishop of Njombe
- Church: Catholic Church
- Diocese: Diocese of Njombe
- In office: 16 January 1971 – 8 June 2002
- Predecessor: Diocese erected
- Successor: Alfred Leonhard Maluma

Orders
- Ordination: 11 October 1959
- Consecration: 25 April 1971 by Laurean Rugambwa

Personal details
- Born: 1930 Uwemba, mandatoryTanganyika Territory, British Empire
- Died: 24 October 2013 (aged 82–83)

Raymond Mwanyika (1930 − 24 October 2013) was a Tanzanian Roman Catholic bishop.

Ordained to the priesthood on 11 October 1959, Mwanyika was named bishop of Roman Catholic Diocese of Njombe, Tanzania on 16 January 1971 and resigned on 8 June 2002.
