= Damian Denis Dallu =

Tanzanian Roman Catholic prelate

The Most Reverend Damian Denis Dallu
- Archbishop of Songea
- Church: Catholic Church
- Archdiocese: Roman Catholic Archdiocese of Songea
- See: Songea
- Appointed: 14 March 2014
- Installed: 18 May 2014
- Predecessor: Norbert Wendelin Mtega
- Successor: Incumbent
- Previous post(s): Bishop of Geita (14 April 2000 until 14 March 2014)

Orders
- Ordination: 15 November 1984
- Consecration: 30 July 2000 by Polycarp Cardinal Pengo

Personal details
- Born: Damian Denis Dallu; 26 April 1955 (age 69); Kiponzelo, Diocese of Iringa, Iringa Region, Tanzania

Damian Denis Dallu is a Tanzanian Roman Catholic prelate who serves as the Archbishop of the Roman Catholic Archdiocese of Songea, Tanzania. He was appointed archbishop on 14 March 2014 by Pope Francis and was installed on 18 May 2014. Before that, he served as the Bishop of the Roman Catholic Diocese of Geita, Tanzania. He was appointed bishop on 14 April 2000 by Pope John Paul II and was consecrated and installed on 30 July 2000.

== Background and education ==
He was born on 26 April 1955 in Kiponzelo, Maboga, Iringa Region. He is the last born in a family of six siblings. He attended Kiponzelo Primary School from grade one to grade four. He transferred to Kalenga Middle School from grade five to grade seven. He then studied at Mafinga Minor Seminary in the Diocese of Iringa, where he completed his secondary school education in 1978.

Later, he graduated with a Master's degree from the Catholic University of Eastern Africa (CUEA) in Nairobi, Kenya. He also holds a Doctorate in Moral Theology, from a university in Belgium.

== Priest ==
On 15 November 1984 he was ordained priest of Geita Diocese. He served as lecturer at the Segerea Major Seminary in the archdiocese of Dar es Salaam.

== Bishop ==
On 14 April 2000 The Holy Father appointed him Bishop of the Roman Catholic Diocese of Geita. He was consecrated and installed on 30 July 2000, by the hands of Polycarp Cardinal Pengo, Archbishop of Dar es Salaam assisted by Bishop Aloysius Balina, Bishop of Shinyanga and Bishop Tarcisius Ngalalekumtwa, Bishop of Iringa.

Pope Francis appointed him Archbishop of the Roman Catholic Archdiocese of Songea on 14 March 2014. He was installed there on 14 May 2014. As of November 2019, Bishop Damian Denis Dallu, Archbishop of Songea, served as the President of the Episcopal Commission for Missions, in Tanzania.

== See also ==
- Catholic Church in Tanzania

== Images and diagrams ==
- New archbishop of Songea (Tanzania) Damian Denis Dallu receives the Pallium from Pope Francis during a mass for the new metropolitan archbishops and the solemnity of Saints Peter and Paul on June 29, 2014 at St Peter's basilica in Vatican

== Succession table ==
Religious titles
Preceded by Aloysius Balina (8 November 1984 - 8 August 1997)	Bishop of Geita (14 April 2000 - 14 March 2014)	Succeeded by Flavian Matindi Kassala (28 April 2016 - present)
Religious titles
Preceded by Norbert Wendelin Mtega (6 July 1992 - 15 May 2013)	Archbishop of Songea; 14 March 2014 - present	Succeeded by incumbent
