= Diocese of Geita =

Roman Catholic diocese in Tanzania, Africa

Coordinates: 2.8789°S 32.2409°E

Diocese of Geita Dioecesis Geitaënsis

Location
- Country: Tanzania
- Metropolitan: Mwanza

Statistics
- Area: 10,697 km^{2} (4,130 sq mi)
- Population: Total; Catholics: (as of 2004); 1,226,499; 232,458 (19.0%)

Information
- Rite: Latin Rite

Current leadership
- Pope: Leo XIV
- Bishop: Flavian Matindi Kassala

The Roman Catholic Diocese of Geita (Latin: Dioecesis Geitaënsis) is a diocese located in Geita in the ecclesiastical province of Mwanza in Tanzania.

== Territory ==
The diocese covers two civil districts in northwestern Tanzania: Geita District in Geita Region, and Sengerema District in Mwanza Region.

The episcopal see is the city of Geita, where Maria Regina della Pace Cathedral is located.

The diocese covers an area of 10,697 km^{2} (4,130 sq mi) and is divided into 25 parishes.

== History ==
- November 8, 1984: Established as Diocese of Geita from the Diocese of Mwanza

== Leadership ==
- Bishops of Geita (Roman rite)
  - Bishop Aloysius Balina (November 8, 1984 – August 8, 1997), appointed Bishop of Shinyanga
  - Bishop Damian Dalu (April 14, 2000 - March 14, 2014), appointed Archbishop of Songea
  - Bishop Flavian Matindi Kassala (April 28, 2016 – Present)

== See also ==
- Roman Catholicism in Tanzania

== Sources ==
- GCatholic.org
- Catholic Hierarchy
