= Diocese of Mpanda =

Roman Catholic diocese in Tanzania, Africa

Coordinates: 6.3399°S 31.0747°E

Diocese of Mpanda Dioecesis Mpandensis

Location
- Country: Tanzania
- Metropolitan: Tabora

Statistics
- Area: 46,346 km^{2} (17,894 sq mi)
- Population: Total; Catholics: (as of 2004); 423,869; 266,016 (62.8%)

Information
- Rite: Latin Rite

Current leadership
- Pope: Leo XIV
- Bishop: Eusebius Alfred Nzigilwa

The Roman Catholic Diocese of Mpanda (Latin: Dioecesis Mpandensis) is a diocese located in Mpanda in the ecclesiastical province of Tabora in Tanzania.

== History ==
- October 23, 2000: Established as Diocese of Mpanda from the Diocese of Sumbawanga

== Special churches ==
The Cathedral is the Cathedral of the Immaculate Conception in Mpanda.

== Leadership ==
- Bishops of Mpanda (Roman rite)
  - Bishop William Pascal Kikoti (23 October 2000 – 28 August 2012)
  - Bishop Gervas John Mwasikwabhila Nyaisonga (17 February 2014 - 12 December 2018), appointed Archbishop of Mbeya
  - Bishop Eusebius Alfred Nzigilwa (since 13 May 2020)

== See also ==
- Roman Catholicism in Tanzania

== Sources ==
- GCatholic.org
- Catholic Hierarchy
