= Tarcisius Ngalalekumtwa =

Tanzanian Catholic prelate

The Most Reverend Tarcisius Ngalalekumtwa
- Bishop of Iringa
- Church: Catholic Church
- Archdiocese: Roman Catholic Archdiocese of Mbeya
- See: Iringa
- Appointed: 21 November 1992
- Installed: 21 November 1992
- Predecessor: Norbert Wendelin Mtega
- Other posts: Coadjutor Bishop of Sumbawanga, Tanzania (14 November 1988 - 21 November 1992); Apostolic Administrator of Songea, Tanzania (15 May 2013 - 18 May 2014)

Orders
- Ordination: 17 April 1973
- Consecration: 6 January 1989 by Pope John Paul II
- Rank: Bishop

Personal details
- Born: Tarcisius Ngalalekumtwa; 25 October 1948 (age 77) Banawanu Village, Diocese of Iringa, Iringa Region, Tanzania

Styles of Tarcisius Ngalalekumtwa
- Reference style: Your Lordship; The Most Reverend
- Spoken style: His Lordship
- Religious style: Bishop

Tarcisius Ngalalekumtwa (born 25 October 1948) is a Tanzanian Catholic prelate who serves as Bishop of the Roman Catholic Diocese of Iringa. He was appointed Bishop of Iringa on 21 November 1992 by Pope John Paul II. Before that, he served as Coadjutor Bishop of the Roman Catholic Diocese of Sumbawanga, Tanzania from 14 November 1988 until 21 November 1992. The Holy Father appointed him bishop on 14 November 1988.

== Background and priesthood ==
He was born on 25 October 1948, at Banawanu Village, Tosamaganga Parish, Diocese of Iringa, Iringa Region, Tanzania. He was ordained priest of the Diocese of Iringa on 17 April 1973. He served in that capacity until 14 November 1988.

== As bishop ==
He was appointed Coadjutor Bishop of the Roman Catholic Diocese of Sumbawanga, Tanzania on 14 November 1988. On 6 January 1989, he received episcopal consecration at the St Peter's Basilica in Rome. The Principal Consecrator was Pope John Paul II assisted by Archbishop Edward Idris Cassidy, Titular Archbishop of Amantia and by Archbishop José Tomás Sánchez, Archbishop Emeritus of Nueva Segovia.

He was appointed Bishop of Iringa, Tanzania on 21 November 1992. From 15 May 2013 until 18 May 2014, Bishop Tarcisius Ngalalekumtwa served as the Apostolic Administrator of the Roman Catholic Archdiocese of Songea.

He celebrated his 25th anniversary (Silver Jubilee) as the Ordinary of the Diocese of Iringa in July 2014 at Saint Therese Cathedral Iringa. In 2017 Bishop Tarcisius Ngalalekumtwa was the president of the Tanzania Episcopal Conference (TEC).

== See also ==
- Catholic Church in Tanzania

== Succession table ==
Catholic Church titles
Preceded by Norbert Wendelin Mtega (28 October 1985 - 6 July 1992)	Bishop of Iringa (21 November 1992 - 28 January 2025)	Succeeded by Romanus Elamu Mihaliè (since 28 January 2025)
