= Catholic University of Health and Allied Sciences =

Private university in Mwanza, Tanzania

Coordinates: 2°31′42″S 32°54′27″E

- Chuo Kikuu cha Kikatoliki cha Afya na Sayansi Shirikishi (Swahili)
- Former names: Bugando University College of Health Sciences; Weill Bugando University College of Health Sciences
- Motto: Discipline. Diligence. Excellence.
- Type: Private
- Affiliations: Tanzania Episcopal Conference
- Chairman: Bishop Augustine Shayo
- Chancellor: Bishop Tarcisius Ngalalekumtwa
- Vice-Chancellor: Prof. Paschalis G. Rugarabamu
- Students: 2,500
- Undergraduates: 1900
- Postgraduates: 55
- Doctoral students: 25
- Location: Mwanza, Tanzania
- Campus: Urban
- Nickname: CUHAS
- Website: University website

Catholic University of Health and Allied Sciences (CUHAS) is a private university in Mwanza, Tanzania.
