= William Pascal Kikoti =

Tanzanian Roman Catholic bishop

- Bishop of Mpanda
- Church: Catholic Church
- Diocese: Diocese of Mpanda
- In office: 23 October 2000 – 28 August 2012
- Predecessor: Diocese erected
- Successor: Gervas John Mwasikwabhila Nyaisonga

Orders
- Ordination: 29 June 1988
- Consecration: 14 January 2001 by Polycarp Pengo

Personal details
- Born: 3 March 1957 Ihumbo (southeast of Iringa), Tanganyika Territory, British Empire
- Died: 28 August 2012 (aged 55)

William Pascal Kikoti (3 March 1957 – 28 August 2012) was the Roman Catholic bishop of the Roman Catholic Diocese of Mpanda, Tanzania.

Ordained to the priesthood in 1988, Kikoti was named bishop in 2000; he died in office.
