= Benigno Luigi Papa =

Italian priest (1935–2023)

His Excellency Benigno Luigi Papa
- Archbishop Emeritus of Taranto
- Appointed: 11 May 1990
- Term ended: 21 November 2011
- Predecessor: Salvatore De Giorgi
- Successor: Filippo Santoro
- Previous post: Bishop of Oppido Mamertina-Palmi (1981–1990)

Orders
- Ordination: 25 March 1961
- Consecration: 27 December 1981 by Anastasio Alberto Ballestrero

Personal details
- Born: 25 August 1935 Spongano, Italy
- Died: 6 March 2023 (aged 87)
- Motto: IN NOME DI CRISTO
- Coat of arms

Styles of Benigno Luigi Papa
- Reference style: His Excellency; The Most Reverend
- Spoken style: Your Excellency
- Religious style: Archbishop

Benigno Luigi Papa (25 August 1935 – 6 March 2023) was an Italian Roman Catholic prelate. He was archbishop of Taranto from 1990 to 2011 and bishop of Oppido Mamertina-Palmi from 1981 to 1990.

Catholic Church titles
Preceded by Salvatore De Giorgi	Archbishop of Taranto; 1990–2011	Succeeded by Filippo Santoro
Preceded by Santo Bergamo	Bishop of Oppido Mamertina-Palmi; 1981–1990	Succeeded by Domenico Crusco
