= Mozotcori =

Africa Proconsularis.

The Diocese of Mozotcori (Latin: Dioecesis Mozotcoritana) is a home suppressed and titular see of the Roman Catholic Church.

== History ==
The seat of the Mozotcori bishop remains unknown but it was centered somewhere in what is today Tunisia. The ancient episcopal see was within of the Roman province of Byzacena, and is known from late antiquity. The only known bishop of this diocese is Fortunato, who took part in the Council of Carthage (484) called by the Vandal king, Huneric, after which the bishop was exiled.

Today Mozotcori survives as a titular bishopric and the current bishop is Stephanus Han Jung-hyun, Auxiliary Bishop of Daejeon.

== Known bishops ==
- Fortunato (mentioned in 484 )
- Jacob Bastiampillai Deogupillai (1967–1972 )
- José Alberto Llaguno Farias (1975 – February 26, 1992)
- José de la Trinidad Valera Angulo (February 15, 1997 – 2001)
- Gilberto Gómez González (2001–2009)
- Eusebius Alfred Nzigilwa (2010-2020)
- Stephanus Han Jung-hyun (2020–present)
