= Diocese of Mbinga =

Roman Catholic diocese in Tanzania, Africa

Coordinates: 10.941111°S 35°E

Diocese of Mbinga Dioecesis Mbingaënsis

Location
- Country: Tanzania
- Metropolitan: Songea

Statistics
- Area: 11,400 km^{2} (4,400 sq mi)
- Population: Total; Catholics: (as of 2004); 461,579; 346,712 (75.1%)

Information
- Rite: Latin Rite

Current leadership
- Pope: Leo XIV
- Bishop: John Chrisostom Ndimbo

The Roman Catholic Diocese of Mbinga (Latin: Dioecesis Mbingaënsis) is a diocese located in Mbinga in the ecclesiastical province of Songea in Tanzania.

== History ==
- December 22, 1986: Established as Diocese of Mbinga from the Diocese of Songea

== Leadership ==
- Bishops of Mbinga (Roman rite)
  - Bishop Emmanuel Alex Mapunda (22 December 1986 — 12 March 2011)
  - Bishop John Chrisostom Ndimbo (since 12 March 2011)

== See also ==
- Roman Catholicism in Tanzania

== Sources ==
- GCatholic.org
- Catholic Hierarchy
