= Stella Maris Mtwara University College =

Coordinates: 10°15′58″S 40°11′10″E

- Swahili: Chuo Kikuu Kishiriki cha Stella Maris Mtwara
- Motto: Education is the light of hope
- Type: Private
- Established: 26 September 2009; 16 years ago
- Affiliations: OUT
- Academic affiliations: Tanzania Episcopal Conference, Open University of Tanzania
- Chancellor: Rt.Rev. Gervas Nyaisonga
- Vice-Chancellor: Ambassador .Prof. Mahalu Costa
- Principal: Prof. Method Martin Kilasara.
- Location: Mtwara, Tanzania
- Campus: Urban
- Constituent college of: St. Augustine University of Tanzania
- Website: stemmuco.ac.tz

The Stella Maris Mtwara University College (STEMMUCO) is a constituent college of St. Augustine University of Tanzania in Mtwara, Tanzania.

== Background ==
Stella Maris Mtwara University College started as a University Centre of the Saint Augustine University of Tanzania (SAUT) on September 26, 2009. SAUT found it important to establish the centre which was later upgraded into a College in April 2012.

== Academic programs ==
The College offers various awards in categories of Certificates, Diplomas, Undergraduate Degrees, and Postgraduate (Graduate) Degree Programs. The College runs the following faculties;- Faculty of Education, Faculty of Social Science, Faculty of Business Administration, and Faculty of Law. Also the College runs the Directorate of Postgraduate Studies which offers the Master of Arts in Educational Management and Planning (MEMP) and Master of Business Administration (MBA). All awards offered by STEMMUCO are given in the name of the Saint Augustine University of Tanzania in subject to section (19), of the Universities Act No. 07 of 2005 of the United Republic of Tanzania. Moreover, the College runs the Centre for Energy Development and Management Studies.
