= Gervas John Mwasikwabhila Nyaisonga =

Tanzanian Catholic prelate (born 1966)

The Most Reverend Gervas John Mwasikwabhila Nyaisonga
- Archbishop of Mbeya
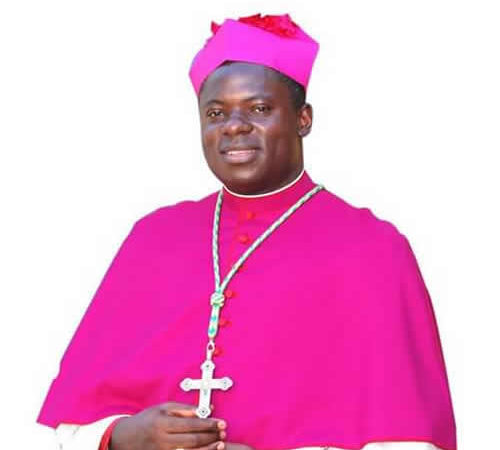
- Archbishop Gervas Nyaisonga in 2018
- Church: Catholic
- Archdiocese: Roman Catholic Archdiocese of Mbeya
- Metropolis: Mbeya
- See: Mbeya
- Appointed: 21 December 2018
- Predecessor: Evaristo Marc Chengula, I.M.C
- Previous posts: Assistant Lecturer at SAUT (2009-2011); Bishop of Dodoma (2011-2014); Bishop of Mpanda (2014-2018); President of the Tanzania Episcopal Conference (2018-2024)

Orders
- Ordination: 11 July 1996 by James Dominic Sangu
- Consecration: 19 March 2011 by Polycarp Cardinal Pengo

Personal details
- Born: Gervas John Mwasikwabhila Nyaisonga; 3 November 1966 (age 60) Bunda, Mara Region, Tanzania
- Denomination: Catholicism
- Residence: Bishop's House, Mbeya
- Education: Kibosho Major Seminary, Moshi (1989-1991); St Charles Lwanga Major Seminary, Segerea, Dar es Salaam (1991-1995); University of Dar es Salaam
- Alma mater: University of Dar es Salaam
- Motto: Ut Vitam Habeant (Latin for 'So that they may have life')
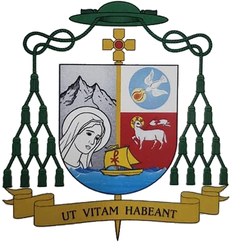
- Coat of arms: Gervas John Mwasikwabhila Nyaisonga's coat of arms

Styles of Gervas John Mwasikwabhila Nyaisonga
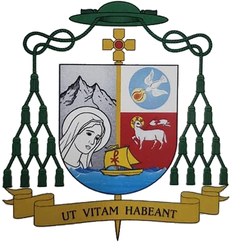
- Reference style: The Most Reverend
- Spoken style: Your Grace
- Religious style: Archbishop

Ordination history of Gervas John Mwasikwabhila Nyaisonga
History
Priestly ordination
- Ordained by: James Dominic Sangu
Episcopal consecration
- Principal consecrator: Polycarp Cardinal Pengo
- Co-consecrators: Jude Thaddaeus Ruwa'ichi, O.F.M.Cap; Evaristo Marc Chengula, I.M.C

Gervas John Mwasikwabhila Nyaisonga (born 3 November 1966) is a Tanzanian prelate of the Catholic Church. He has been Archbishop of Roman Catholic Archdiocese of Mbeya since 2018. He was consecrated bishop on 2011. He previously served as Bishop of the diocese of Dodoma from 2011 until 2014. He then served as Bishop of the diocese of Mpanda from 2014 until 2018. He was President of Tanzania Episcopal Conference from 2018 to 2024. He was appointed bishop on 9 January 2011 by Pope Benedict XVI

== Early life and education ==
He was born on 3 November 1966 at Bunda, Bunda District, in the Mara Region in northern Tanzania. He attended elementary school from 1976 until 1982 at the Mwenga Primary School in Vwawa, Songwe Region, Tanzania.

In 1983 he entered St Joseph's Minor Seminary in Kaengesa in the diocese of Sumbawanga, for the classes of superior preparation for priesthood. In 1987 he transferred to the Sangu Secondary School in Mbeya. In 1989 he entered the Kibosho Major Seminary at Kibosho, where he studied Philosophy. He then entered St Charles Lwanga Major Seminary in Dar-es-Salaam, in 1991, where he studied Theology.

He studies at the St. Augustine University of Tanzania (SAUT), from 1998, graduating in 2001 with a Bachelor of Arts degree in the Science of Education. Between 2006 and 2009, he studied at the University of Dar-es-Salaam, graduating from there with a Master of Arts degree in Social Sciences.

== Priest ==
He was ordained a priest of Mbeya on 11 July 1996. He served in that capacity until 9 Januarys 2011.

As a priest, he served in various roles inside and outside his diocese including:

- Assistant parish priest in Itumba Parish from 1996 until 1998
- Diocesan director of the Scouts in Mbeya Diocese from 1996 until 1998
- Teacher at Mbalizi Junior Seminary from 1996 until 1998
- Spiritual Director at Mbalizi Junior Seminary from 1996 until 1998
- Regional Manager of the Scouts for the scout region of Mbeya from 1998 until 2001
- Teacher at Pandahill Secondary School from 2001 until 2006
- Director of the Institute from 2001 until 2006
- Assistant Lecturer at St. Augustine University of Tanzania, in Mwanza, since 2009.

== Bishop ==
On 9 January 2011 Pope Benedict XVI appointed him Bishop of the Diocese of Dodoma, at that a Suffragan of the Archdiocese of Dar-es-Salaam. He was consecrated and installed at Saint Paul of the Cross Cathedral, in Dodoma, in the Diocese of Dodoma on 19 March 2011. He was consecrated by the hands of Polycarp Cardinal Pengo, Archbishop of Dar-es-Salaam assisted by Archbishop Jude Thaddaeus Ruwa'ichi, Archbishop of Mwanza and Bishop Evaristo Marc Chengula, Bishop of Mbeya.

On 17 February 2014, Pope Francis appointed him as Bishop of Mpanda Diocese. Bishop Nyaisonga succeeded the late Bishop William Pascal Kikoti who died on 28 August 2012.

On 21 December 2018, The Holy Father created the Archdiocese of Mbeya and appointed Gervas John Mwasikwabhila Nyaisonga as the founding archbishop of the new Metropolitan province of Mbeya. The new archbishop received the Pallium from Pope Francis on 29 June 2019. He was installed as archbishop on 28 April 2019.

== See also ==
- Catholic Church in Tanzania

== Figures and diagrams ==
- Archbishop Gervas John Mwasikwabhila Nyaisonga, Archbishop of the Archdiocese of Mbeya As of 2021.

== Succession table ==
Catholic Church titles
Preceded by Jude Thaddaeus Ruwa'ichi (15 January 2005 - 10 November 2010)	Bishop of Dodoma (9 January 2011 - 17 February 2014)	Succeeded by Beatus Kinyaiya
Preceded by William Pascal Kikoti (23 October 2000 - 28 August 2012)	Bishop of Mpanda (17 February 2014 - 21 December 2018)	Succeeded by Eusebius Alfred Nzigilwa
Preceded by Evaristo Marc Chengula (8 November 1996 - 21 November 2018)	Archbishop of Mbeya (21 Dec 2018 - present)	Succeeded by Incumbent
