= Filippo Santoro =

Italian archbishop and theologian

- Archbishop Emeritus of Taranto
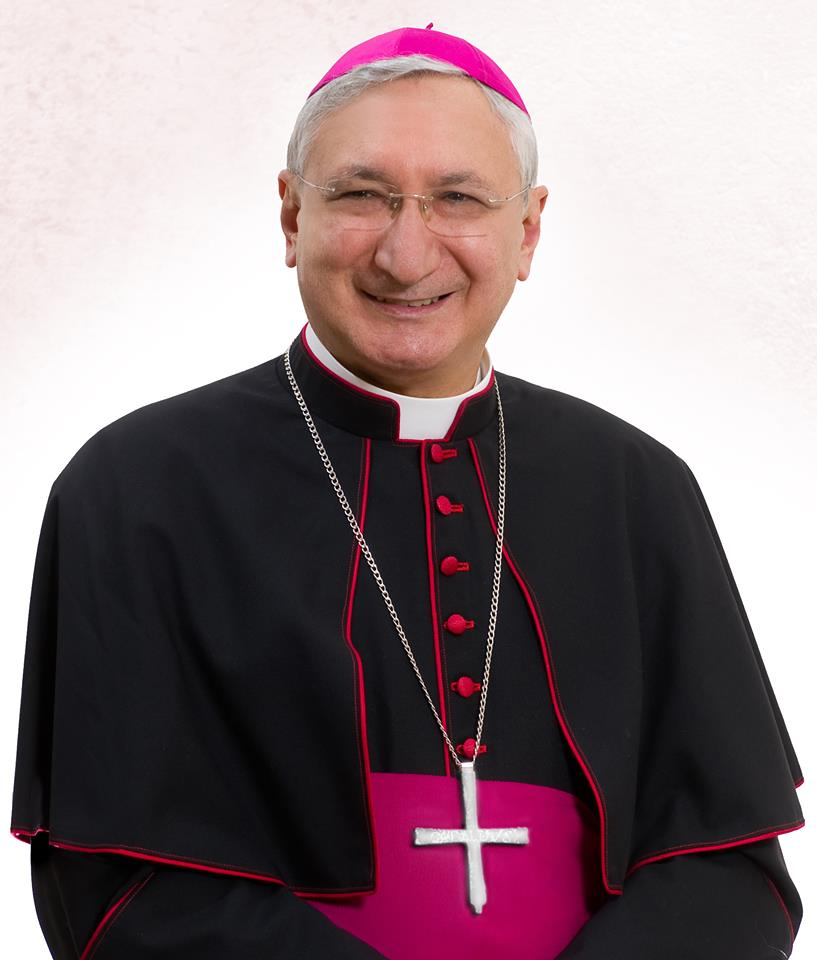
- Church: Catholic Church
- In office: 21 November 2011 – 22 July 2023
- Predecessor: Benigno Luigi Papa
- Successor: Ciro Miniero
- Previous posts: Bishop of Petrópolis (2004-2011); Titular Bishop of Tuscamia (1996-2004)Auxiliary Bishop of São Sebastião do Rio de Janeiro (1996-2004)

Orders
- Ordination: 20 May 1972 by Enrico Nicodemo
- Consecration: 29 June 1996 by Eugênio Sales

Personal details
- Born: 12 July 1948 (age 77) Bari, Italy

Filippo Santoro (born 12 July 1948) is an Italian Roman Catholic prelate. He was made archbishop of Taranto in 2011. In 2023, he resigned as archbishop.
