= Guido del Mestri =

Italian prelate

His Eminence Guido del Mestri
- Cardinal-Deacon of Sant'Eustachio
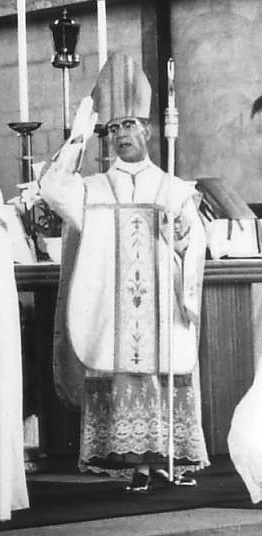
- Church: Roman Catholic Church
- Appointed: 28 June 1991
- Term ended: 2 August 1993
- Predecessor: Giacomo Violardo
- Successor: Sergio Sebastiani
- Previous posts: Apostolic Delegate to British Eastern and Western Africa (1959-67); Titular Archbishop of Tuscarnia (1961-91); Apostolic Pro-Nuncio to Kenya (1965-67); Apostolic Delegate to Mexico (1967-70); Apostolic Pro-Nuncio to Canada (1970-75); Apostolic Nuncio to Germany (1975-84)

Orders
- Ordination: 11 April 1936 by Francesco Marchetti Selvaggiani
- Consecration: 31 December 1961 by Laurean Rugambwa
- Created cardinal: 28 June 1991 by Pope John Paul II
- Rank: Cardinal-Deacon

Personal details
- Born: Guido del Mestri; 13 January 1911 Banja Luka, Austro-Hungarian Empire
- Died: 2 August 1993 (aged 82) Theresienklinik Hospital, Nürnberg, Germany
- Education: Almo Collegio Capranica; Pontifical Gregorian University; Pontifical Ecclesiastical Academy
- Coat of arms: Guido del Mestri's coat of arms

Guido del Mestri also Guido Del Mestri (13 January 1911– 2 August 1993) was an Italian prelate of the Catholic Church who worked in the diplomatic service of the Holy See from 1940 to 1984. He was made a cardinal in 1991.

== Biography ==
Guido del Mestri was born in Banja Luka in Bosnia and Herzegovina, then under Austro-Hungarian rule, on 13 January 1911 to an Italian father, Count Gian Vito Del Mestri, and an Austrian mother, Baroness Marianna de Grazia. He grew up speaking Croatian, Italian, and German. He studied at the Jesuit Lyceum of Kalksburg, Vienna, and then at the Almo Collegio Capranica. He also earned degrees in theology and canon law at the Pontifical Gregorian University. He was ordained a priest on 11 April 1936 and joined the clergy of the Diocese of Gorizia, under Italian control since 1918.

To prepare for a diplomat's career he entered the Pontifical Ecclesiastical Academy in 1937. His early assignments took him to Yugoslavia, Lebanon, Indonesia, and Germany, and included a stint in Rome. He was expelled from Romania with the rest of the nunciature personnel in July 1950 when the country came under Communist rule. He opened the new nunciature in Syria in 1951.

On 21 September 1959, Pope John XXIII named him Apostolic Delegate to British Eastern and Western Africa. Pope John named him titular archbishop of Tuscamia on 28 October 1961 and he received his episcopal consecration in Nairobi on 31 December from Cardinal Laurean Rugambwa.

On 27 October 1965, Pope Paul VI appointed him Apostolic Pro-Nuncio to Kenya. On 9 September 1967, Pope Paul named him Apostolic Delegate to Mexico. On 20 June 1970, Pope Paul appointed him Apostolic Pro-Nuncio to Canada. On 13 August 1975, Pope Paul named him Apostolic Nuncio to Germany. He resigned in 1984.

In January 1989, Pope John Paul made him a member of the Congregation for the Evangelization of Peoples and the Council for the Public Affairs of the Church.

He was named a cardinal by Pope John Paul II on 28 June 1991. The New York Times identified him as an Italian.

He died at the Theresienklinik in Nuremberg, Germany, where in retirement he served as chaplain, on 2 August 1993.
