= Tuscamia =

Roman-Berber civitas

Tuscamia was an ancient Roman-Berber civitas in the province of Mauretania Caesariensis. The town is known from late antiquity as flourishing through the Vandal Kingdom and Roman Empire, and possibly through the Muslim conquest of the Maghreb. The exact location of the ancient town is now lost to history, but it was somewhere in today's Algeria.

== Bishopric ==
Tuscamia, was also the seat of an ancient Catholic bishopric. The only known bishop of this African diocese is Massimo, who took part in the synod assembled in Carthage in 484 by the Arian King Huneric the Vandal, after which Massimo was exiled.

Today Tuscamia survives as titular see of the Roman Catholic Church and the current bishop is Antônio Augusto Dias Duarte, auxiliary bishop of Rio de Janeiro. Guido Del Mestri and Filippo Santoro were both long-term bishops of the diocese in the 20th century.

== See also ==
- Mauretania Caesariensis
