= St. Augustine University of Tanzania =

Private university in Mwanza, Tanzania

- Chuo Kikuu cha Mtakatifu Agostino Tanzania (Swahili)
- Former names: Nyegezi Social Training Institute, Nyegezi Social Training Centre
- Motto: Building the City of God
- Type: Private
- Established: 2002; 24 years ago
- Religious affiliation: Tanzania Episcopal Conference
- Academic affiliations: AAU, ACU
- Chairperson: Severine Niwemugizi
- Vice-Chancellor: Thadeus Mkamwa
- Location: Sirari-Mbeya Road, Lumoga, Mwanza, Tanzania; 2°36′12″S 32°53′50″E
- Campus: Multiple
- Website: www.saut.ac.tz

St. Augustine University of Tanzania (SAUT) is a private university in Mwanza, Tanzania. It was founded by the Catholic Bishops of Tanzania in 1998 (accredited in 2002) as a secular, nonprofit, private institution. Before 1998, SAUT was called first Nyegezi Social Training Centre and then Nyegezi Social Training Institute. SAUT has over 10,000 students with an anticipated minimal rise each new academic year. The university attracts students from Tanzania and elsewhere, particularly Kenya, Uganda, Sudan, Ethiopia, Burundi, Malawi, Zambia, and recently Germany and other foreign nations. SAUT admits students of all nationalities and religious affiliations.

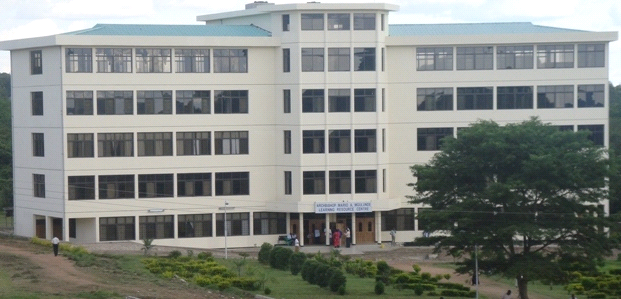
The Mgulunde learning resource centre.

SAUT extends over 600 acres (2.4 km^{2}) in the Nyegezi-Malimbe area, 10 km (6.2 mi) south of Mwanza on the shores of Lake Victoria. The university is divided into two campuses. The main campus (old campus) houses the administration buildings and the Faculty of Business Administration. The Malimbe campus, located one km away, is home to the Faculty of Law, Social Sciences, Engineering, Business Administration, Education and Mass Communication.

== Academic programs ==
St. Augustine University of Tanzania retained the Advanced Diploma and Certificate Programs offered by its predecessor, the Nyegezi Social Training Institute, and in addition offers a bachelors and a masters program within a number of faculties.

The Faculty of Law offers a four year Bachelor of Law degree (LL.B), and a Master's degree in Law (LL.M) on various specialisations such as Masters in Economic Law, and various others. The Faculty has also built itself a name in the international arena through several continuous participations in international moot court competitions. Examples of these include the African Human rights Moot Court Competition in 2009 and 2011, ranking the first among Tanzanian participating universities such as University of Dar es Salaam, Ruaha University College (one of its constituent colleges), and the Open University of Tanzania in 2009 Lagos, Nigeria competition. In the 2011 Pretoria, South Africa Competition, it took the same lead against Muslims University, and Mzumbe University in the same Africa's most prestigious competition. The Phillip C. Jessup International Law Moot Court Competition is another more prestigious annual competition year in Washington D.C., USA this is another area where the faculty has built so much proficiency, since it first participated in 2010.

=== The Faculty of Social Sciences and Mass Communications ===
The Faculty of Social Sciences and Mass Communications offers the below courses;

1. Master of Arts in Mass Communication
2. Bachelor of Arts in Mass Communication
3. Bachelor of Arts in Education
4. Bachelor of Arts in Public relations and Marketing
5. Bachelor of Arts in Sociology, an # Advanced Diploma in Journalism, a # Postgraduate Diploma in Mass Communication
6. Bachelor of Arts in Public Relations and marketing
7. Bachelor of arts Philosophy and Ethics
8. Certificate Course in Journalism and Media Studies.

=== The Faculty of Business Administration ===
The Faculty of Business Administration offers

1. Bachelor of Business Administration
2. BA in Accounting and Finance
3. BA in Marketing
4. BA in Human Resources
5. BA in Procurement and Logistics
6. Bachelor of Arts in economics.

Apart from the degree programs, an Advanced Diploma in Accountancy, an Advanced Diploma in Procurement and Logistics Management, a Certificate Course in Accountancy, a Certificate course in Health Administration, a Certificate Course in Food Security and Grain Management, a Certificate in Logistics Management and a Postgraduate Diploma in Accounting and Finance are offered.

=== Constituent Colleges and University Centres ===
SAUT incorporates the following eight respective constituent colleges namely:-

1. Archbishop Mihayo University College of Tabora
2. Archbishop James University College
3. Jordan University College
4. Mwenge University College of Education
5. Ruaha University College
6. St. Francis University College of Health and Allied Sciences
7. Stella Maris Mtwara University College
8. Cardinal Rugambwa Memorial University College

The Weill Bugando University College of Health and Allied Sciences (WBUCHS) established in 2003 at the Bugando Medical Centre in Mwanza, was a part of SAUT until it became the Catholic University of Health and Allied Sciences, a full-fledged university.

The university runs the following three campuses namely:-

1. SAUT Dar es Salaam City Centre
2. SAUT Arusha City Centre.
3. SAUT Mbeya City Centre.

Future programs of SAUT include Agricultural Science (in Mwanza), an Institute for Rural Development (Mwanza), Masters of Business Administration (Mwanza) and a Constituent College of Law and Applied Sciences and Technology (Songea).

SAUT is a member of the Association of Catholic Universities and Higher Institutes of Africa and Madagascar (ACHUIAM), the Inter-University Council of East Africa, the Tanzania Association of Private Universities, the Commonwealth Association of Universities of Africa, and the Council for Higher Education, and the Association of Member Episcopal Conference of Eastern Africa (AMECEA).
