= Norbert Wendelin Mtega =

Tanzanian Roman Catholic prelate (born 1945)

The Most Reverend Norbert Wendelin Mtega
- Archbishop Emeritus of Songea, Tanzania
- Church: Catholic Church
- Archdiocese: Roman Catholic Archdiocese of Songea
- See: Songea
- Appointed: 6 July 1992
- Installed: 6 July 1992
- Term ended: 15 May 2013
- Predecessor: James Joseph Komba
- Successor: Damian Denis Dallu
- Other post: Bishop of Iringa (28 October 1985 - 6 July 1992)

Orders
- Ordination: 14 November 1973
- Consecration: 6 January 1986 by Pope John Paul II
- Rank: Archbishop

Personal details
- Born: Norbert Wendelin Mtega; 17 August 1945 (age 80) Kinyika Village, Diocese of Njombe, Tanzania

Styles of Norbert Wendelin Mtega
- Reference style: Your Lordship; The Most Reverend
- Spoken style: His Lordship
- Religious style: Bishop

Norbert Wendelin Mtega (born 17 August 1945), is a Tanzanian Roman Catholic prelate who was the Archbishop of the Roman Catholic Diocese of Songea, Tanzania from 1992 until his resignation in 2013. Before that, from October 1985 until July 1992 he was the Bishop of the Roman Catholic Diocese of Iringa, Tanzania. He was appointed bishop by Pope John Paul II on 28 October 1985. On 15 May 2013, the Holy Father Francis accepted the bishop's resignation from the pastoral care of Songea Catholic Archdiocese. He lives on as Archbishop Emeritus of Songea, Tanzania.

== Background and education ==
He was born on 17 August 1945, at Kinyika Village, Makete District, Njombe Region, Diocese of Njombe, Tanzania. This is located in the southwestern corner of the country, close to the international border with Malawi. He studied philosophy and theology before he was ordained priest of the Roman Catholic Diocese of Njombe, Tanzania on 14 November 1973.

== Priest ==
On 14 November 1973 he was ordained a priest of Njombe Diocese, Tanzania. He served in that capacity until 28 October 1985.

== As bishop ==
On 28 October 1985 Pope John Paul II appointed Reverend Father Norbert Wendelin Mtega, as Bishop of the Roman Catholic Diocese of Iringa, Tanzania. He was consecrated and installed at the Saint Peter's Basilica, Rome, Italy, by the hands of Pope John Paul II assisted by Agostino Cardinal Casaroli, Cardinal-Bishop of Porto e Santa Rufina and Bernardin Cardinal Gantin, Cardinal-Priest of Sacro Cuore di Cristo Re.

Pope Francis appointed him the Local Ordinary (bishop) of the Archdiocese of Songea in Tanzania on 6 July 1992. He served in that role until 15 May 2013. On that date The Holly Father Francis accepted the resignation of Archbishop Norbert Wendelin Mtega from the pastoral care of the archdiocese of Songea. He lives on as Archbishop Emeritus of Songea, Tanzania.

== See also ==
- Catholic Church in Tanzania

== Succession table ==
Catholic Church titles
Preceded by Mario Epifanio Abdallah Mgulunde (23 October 1969 - 9 March 1985)	Bishop of Iringa, Tanzania (28 October 1985 - 6 July 1992)	Succeeded by Tarcisius Ngalalekumtwa (21 November 1992 - 28 January 2025)
Preceded by James Joseph Komba (6 February 1969 - 1 February 1992)	Archbishop of Songea (6 July 1992 - 15 May 2013)	Succeeded by Damian Denis Dallu (since 14 March 2014)
