= Roman Catholic Diocese of Lindi =

Roman Catholic diocese in Tanzania, Africa

Coordinates: 10.0080°S 39.7154°E

Diocese of Lindi Dioecesis Lindiensis

Location
- Country: Tanzania
- Metropolitan: Songea

Statistics
- Area: 56,060 km^{2} (21,640 sq mi)
- Population: Total; Catholics: (as of 2004); 791,306; 128,438 (16.2%)

Information
- Rite: Latin Rite

Current leadership
- Pope: Leo XIV
- Bishop: Wolfgang Pisa

The Roman Catholic Diocese of Lindi (Latin: Dioecesis Lindiensis) is a diocese located in Lindi in the ecclesiastical province of Songea in Tanzania.

== History ==
- August 5, 1963: Established as Diocese of Nachingwea from the Territorial Abbacy of Mtwara
- October 17, 1986: Renamed as Diocese of Lindi

== Leadership ==
Bishops of Nachingwea

- Arnold Ralph Cotey, S.D.S. (1963.08.05 – 1983.11.11)
- Polycarp Pengo (1983.11.11 – 1986.10.17), appointed bishop of Tunduru-Masasi, later cardinal

Bishops of Lindi

- Maurus Libaba (1986.10.17 – 1988.03.03)
- Bruno Pius Ngonyani (1990.10.06 – 2022.04.09)
- Wolfgang Pisa, O.F.M.Cap. (since 2022.04.09)

== See also ==
- Roman Catholicism in Tanzania

== Sources ==
- GCatholic.org
- Catholic Hierarchy
