= Diocese of Iringa =

Roman Catholic diocese in Tanzania, Africa

Coordinates: 7.7836°S 35.6895°E

Diocese of Iringa Dioecesis Iringaënsis
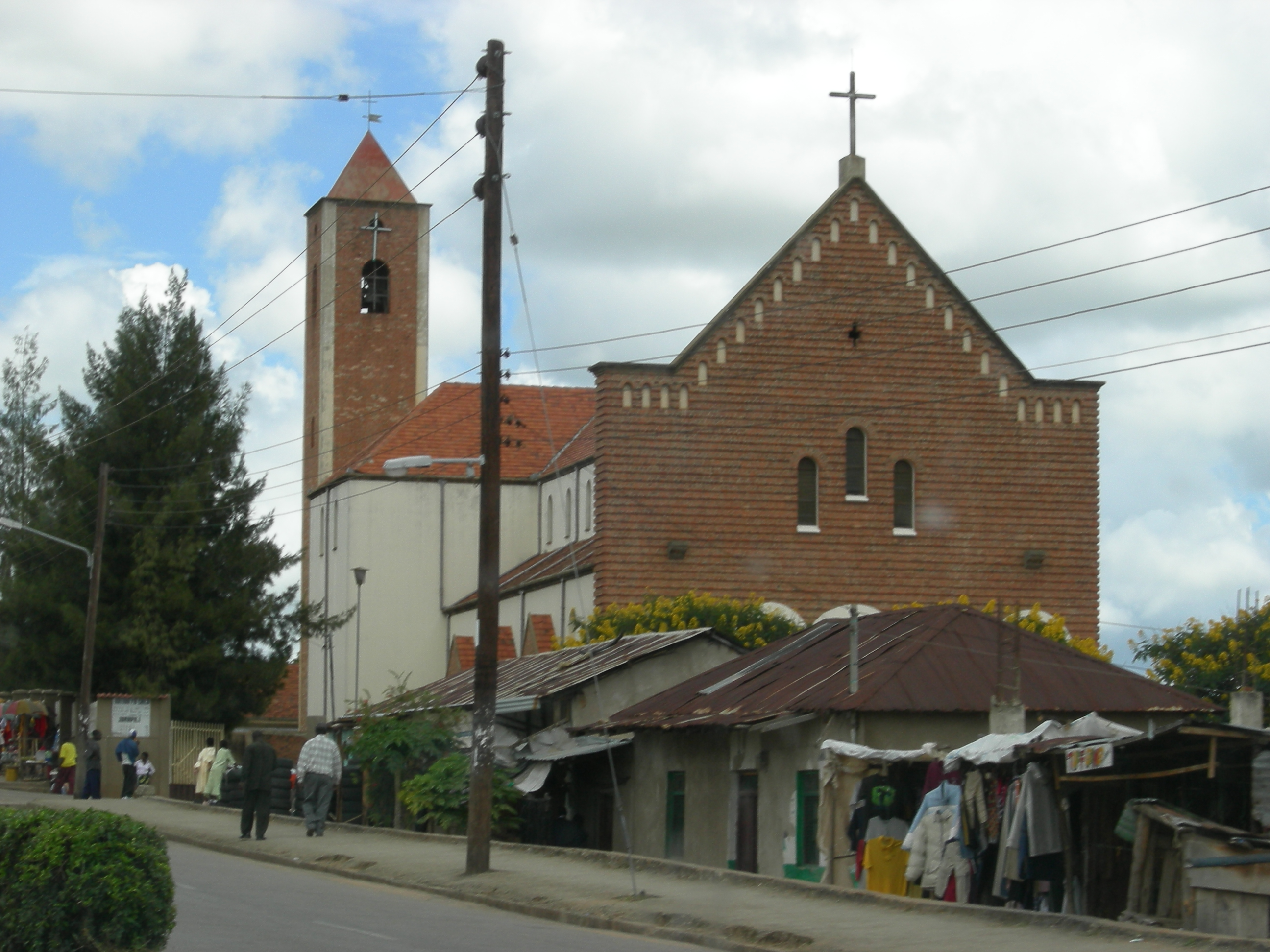

Location
- Country: Tanzania
- Metropolitan: Mbeya

Statistics
- Area: 43,318 km^{2} (16,725 sq mi)
- Population: Total; Catholics: (as of 2006); 2,367,962; 588,438 (24.9%)

Information
- Rite: Latin Rite

Current leadership
- Pope: Leo XIV
- Bishop: Romanus Elamu Mihali
- Bishops emeritus: Tarcisius Ngalalekumtwa

The Roman Catholic Diocese of Iringa (Latin: Dioecesis Iringaënsis) is a diocese located in Iringa in the ecclesiastical province of Mbeya in Tanzania.

== History ==
- March 3, 1922: Established as Apostolic Prefecture of Iringa from the Apostolic Vicariate of Dar-es-Salaam
- January 8, 1948: Promoted as Apostolic Vicariate of Iringa
- March 25, 1953: Promoted as Diocese of Iringa
- December 21, 2018: Changed metropolia from Songea to Mbeya

== Leadership ==
- Prefects Apostolic of Iringa (Roman rite)
  - Fr. Francesco Cagliero, I.C.M. (1922.05.10 – 1935)
  - Fr. Attilio Beltramino, I.C.M. (1936.02.18 – 1948.01.08 see below)
- Vicar Apostolic of Iringa (Roman rite)
  - Bishop Attilio Beltramino, I.C.M. (see above 1948.01.08 – 1953.03.25 see below)
- Bishops of Iringa (Roman rite)
  - Bishop Attilio Beltramino, I.C.M. (see above 1953.03.25 – 1965.10.03)
  - Bishop Mario Epifanio Abdallah Mgulunde (1969.10.23 – 1985.03.09), appointed Archbishop of Tabora
  - Bishop Norbert Wendelin Mtega (1985.10.28 – 1992.07.06), appointed Archbishop of Songea
  - Bishop Tarcisius Ngalalekumtwa (21 November 1992 - 28 January 2025)
  - Bishop Romanus Elamu Mihali (since 28 January 2025)

== See also ==
- Roman Catholicism in Tanzania

== Sources ==
- GCatholic.org
- Catholic Hierarchy
