= Tunduru =

- Town
- Location within Tanzania
- Coordinates: 11°04′S 37°21′E
- Country: Tanzania
- Zone: Southern Highlands
- Region: Ruvuma

Population (2022 census)
  - Total: 48,000
- Time zone: UTC+3 (EAT)
- Postcode: 576xx

Tunduru is a town in Tunduru District, Ruvuma Region, Tanzania, East Africa. It is the administrative seat for Tunduru District, and is administratively divided into two wards; Mlingoti West (Mlingoti Magharibi) and Mlingoti East (Mlingoti Mashariki).
