= Archdiocese of Mbeya =

Catholic archdiocese in Tanzania

Coordinates: 8.9°S 33.45°E

Archdiocese of Mbeya Archdioecesis Mbeyaënsis

Location
- Country: Tanzania
- Metropolitan: Archdiocese of Mbeya

Statistics
- Area: 60,348 km^{2} (23,300 sq mi)
- Population: Total; Catholics: (as of 2018); 2,783,000; 548,000 (19.7%)

Information
- Rite: Latin Rite

Current leadership
- Pope: Leo XIV
- Bishop: Gervas John Mwasikwabhila Nyaisonga

The Roman Catholic Archdiocese of Mbeya (Latin: Archedioecesis Mbeyaënsis) is an archdiocese located in Mbeya in Tanzania.

== History ==
- July 18, 1932: Established as Mission “sui iuris” of Tukuyu from the Apostolic Vicariate of Tanganyika
- March 29, 1938: Promoted as Apostolic Prefecture of Tukuyu
- July 14, 1949: Promoted as Apostolic Vicariate of Mbeya
- March 25, 1953: Promoted as Diocese of Mbeya (in the ecclesiastical province of Songea)
- December 21, 2018: Promoted as Archdiocese of Mbeya

== Leadership ==
- Ecclesiastical Superior of Tukuyu (Roman rite)
  - Fr. Max Theodor Franz Donders, M. Afr. (1932.11.11 – 1938)
- Prefects Apostolic of Tukuyu (Roman rite)
  - Fr. Ludovico Haag, M. Afr. (1938.04.08 – 1947)
  - Fr. Anthony van Oorschoot, M. Afr. (1947 – 1949.07.14 see below)
- Vicars Apostolic of Mbeya (Roman rite)
  - Bishop Anthony van Oorschoot, M. Afr. (see above 1949.07.14 – 1953.03.25 see below)
- Bishops of Mbeya (Roman rite)
  - Bishop Anthony van Oorschoot, M. Afr. (see above 1953.03.25 – 1964.12.10)
  - Bishop James Dominic Sangu (1966.05.03 – 1996.11.28)
  - Bishop Evaristo Marc Chengula, I.M.C. (1996.11.08 - 2018.11.21)
- Archbishops of Mbeya
  - Archbishop Gervas John Mwasikwabhila Nyaisonga (since 2018.12.21)
- Auxiliary bishops of Mbeya
  - Bishop Godfrey Jackson Mwasekaga (since 9 March 2024)

== Suffragan Dioceses ==
- Diocese of Iringa
- Diocese of Sumbawanga

== See also ==
- Roman Catholicism in Tanzania

== Sources ==
- GCatholic.org
- Catholic Hierarchy
