= Polycarp Pengo =

Tanzanian Roman Catholic cardinal (1944–2026)

His Eminence Polycarp Pengo
- Cardinal, Archbishop of Dar es Salaam
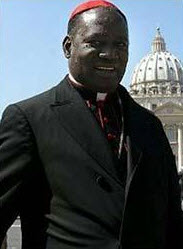
- Pengo in 2013
- Church: Catholic Church
- Archdiocese: Dar es Salaam
- Installed: 22 July 1992
- Term ended: 15 August 2019
- Predecessor: Laurean Rugambwa
- Successor: Jude Thaddaeus Ruwa'ichi
- Other post: Cardinal-Priest of Nostra Signora de La Salette
- Previous posts: Bishop of Nachingwea (1983–1985); Bishop of Tunduru-Masasi (1985–1990); Coadjutor Archbishop of Dar es Salaam (1990-1992); Archbishop of Dar-es-Salaam (1992–2019)

Orders
- Ordination: 20 June 1971 by Charles Msakila
- Consecration: 6 January 1984 by John Paul II
- Created cardinal: 21 February 1998 by John Paul II
- Rank: Cardinal Priest

Personal details
- Born: Polycarp Pengo; 5 August 1944 Mwazye, Rukwa Region, Tanganyika Territory (now Tanzania)
- Died: 19 February 2026 (aged 81) Dar Es Salaam, Tanzania
- Buried: Pugu, Dar Es Salaam
- Denomination: Roman Catholic
- Motto: Ecce ego domine (Here I am, Lord)
- Coat of arms: Polycarp Pengo's coat of arms

Ordination history of Polycarp Pengo
History
Priestly ordination
- Ordained by: Charles Msakila
- Date: 20 June 1971
- Place: Diocese of Sumbawanga
Episcopal consecration
- Principal consecrator: John Paul II
- Co-consecrators: Eduardo Martínez Somalo, Duraisamy Simon Lourdusamy
- Date: 6 January 1984
- Place: Saint Peter's Basilica, Rome, Italy
Cardinalate
- Elevated by: John Paul II
- Date: 21 February 1998
Episcopal succession
Bishops consecrated by Polycarp Pengo as principal consecrator
- Anthony Mathias Banzi: 15 September 1994
- Agapiti Ndorobo: 16 June 1995
- Augustine Ndeliakyama Shao, C.S.Sp: 27 April 1997
- Jude Thaddaeus Ruwa'ichi, O.F.M. Cap: 16 May 1999
- Jacob Venance Koda: 30 May 1999
- Desiderius M. Rwoma: 11 July 1999
- Method Kilaini: 18 March 2000
- Damian Denis Dallu: 30 July 2000
- William Pascal Kikoti: 14 January 2001
- Ludovick Joseph Minde, ALCP/OSS: 05 August 2001
- Alfred Leonhard Maluma: 01 September 2002
- Castor Paul Msemwa: 30 January 2005
- Beatus Kinyaiya, O.F.M. Cap: 02 July 2006
- Isaac Amani Massawe: 22 February 2008
- Protase Rugambwa: 13 April 2008
- Almachius Vincent Rweyongeza: 06 November 2008
- Salutaris Melchior Libena: 19 March 2010
- Eusebius Alfred Nzigilwa: 19 March 2010
- Rogatus Kimaryo, C.S.Sp.: 13 June 2010
- Renatus Leonard Nkwande: 20 February 2011
- Bernardin Francis Mfumbusa: 15 May 2011
- John Chrisostom Ndimbo: 05 June 2011
- Titus Joseph Mdoe: 01 May 2013
- Liberatus Sangu: 12 April 2015

Styles of Polycarp Pengo
- Reference style: His Eminence
- Spoken style: Your Eminence
- Religious style: Cardinal
- Informal style: Cardinal
- See: Dar es Salaam

Polycarp Pengo (5 August 1944 – 19 February 2026) was a Tanzanian prelate of the Catholic Church who was Archbishop of Dar-es-Salaam, from 1992 to 2019. A bishop from 1983, he was made a cardinal in 1998.

== Biography ==
Polycarp Pengo was born on 5 August 1944. He was ordained a priest in 1971 by Bishop Charles Msakila. He studied Moral Theology in Rome at the Pontifical Lateran University, obtaining a doctorate in 1977. He taught Moral theology in Kipalapala Theological Seminary for a short time, and then became the first Rector of Segerea Theological Seminary in Dar-es-Salaam up to 1983.

He was made Bishop of Nachingwea (now Lindi) in 1983, and of Tunduru-Masasi in 1985.

In 1990 he was named Coadjutor Archbishop of Dar es Salaam, and in 1992 he became Archbishop of Dar-es-Salaam, following the resignation of Cardinal Laurean Rugambwa.

Pengo was proclaimed a cardinal by Pope John Paul II in the consistory of 21 February 1998. Pengo was one of the cardinal electors who participated in the 2005 papal conclave that elected Pope Benedict XVI and in the 2013 papal conclave that elected Pope Francis.

He had the following Curial Memberships: Evangelization of the Peoples, Doctrine of Faith (congregations); Interreligious Dialogue; Culture (councils); Special Council for Africa of the General of the Synod of Bishops.

From 2007 he was president of the SECAM (Symposium of Episcopal Conferences of Africa and Madagascar).

On 18 September 2012, he was appointed by Pope Benedict XVI as a Synod Father for the October 2012 13th Ordinary General Assembly of the Synod of Bishops.

Pope Francis accepted his retirement as archbishop on 15 August 2019.

On 19 February 2026, Pengo died while receiving treatment at the Jakaya Kikwete Cardiac Institute (JKCI). He was 81.

== Views ==
=== Homosexuality ===
In 2000, Pengo hit out at the commission of homosexual acts, saying it was one of the most heinous sins on earth.

=== Clashes in Tanzania ===
In 2004, he lashed out at the perpetrators of clashes claiming to pursue a religious cause.

=== Church teaching on AIDS ===
Pengo has declared that the AIDS epidemic cannot be overcome by relying exclusively or primarily on the distribution of prophylactics, but only through a strategy based on education to individual responsibility in the framework of a moral view of human sexuality.

Catholic Church titles
Preceded by Arnold Ralph Cotey	Bishop of Nachingwea; 11 November 1983 – 17 October 1986	Diocese abolished
Diocese created	Bishop of Tunduru–Masasi; 17 October 1986 – 22 January 1990	Succeeded by Magnus Mwalunyungu
Preceded by Laurean Rugambwa	Archbishop of Dar-es-Salaam; 22 July 1992 – 15 August 2019	Succeeded by Jude Thaddaeus Ruwa'ichi
Preceded by Alfredo Vicente Scherer	Cardinal Priest of Nostra Signora de La Salette; 21 February 1998 – 19 February 2026	Vacant
Preceded by John Olorunfemi Onaiyekan	President of Symposium of the Episcopal Conferences of Africa and Madagascar; June 2007 – September 2013	Succeeded by Gabriel Mbilingi
