= Tanzania Episcopal Conference =

Roman Catholic episcopal conference of Tanzania

The Tanzania Episcopal Conference (TEC) is the conference of bishops of the Roman Catholic Church in Tanzania. Founded in 1956, the Episcopal Conference was officially recognized by the government in 1957. It includes all the Catholic bishops of the country, ordinary, and auxiliary emeritus. Its headquarters is located in the capital Dar es Salaam. The statutes of the Conference were approved by the Holy See on January 8, 1980.

The TEC is a member of the Association of Member Episcopal Conferences in Eastern Africa (AMECEA) and Symposium of Episcopal Conferences of Africa and Madagascar (SECAM).

== Structure ==
The TEC consists of the following institutions: the Plenary Assembly, the Permanent Council, the Secretary-General, eight departments, three research units, eight commissions. The authority and responsibility for managing the activities of TEC are granted Plenary Assembly, composed of all members, which meets once a year and is chaired by the President of the Conference. The management of the TEC is instead assigned to the Permanent Council, assisted by the Secretariat General. The Permanent Council is composed of the President of the Presiding Bishop of TEC and the Departments of TEC. The duties of the Secretary General are to organize the work of the Plenary Assembly, to implement its decisions, to liaise between the dioceses of the country.

The TEC is then composed of eight departments (finance, pastoral, health, charity, communications, lay apostolate, education and seminars, liturgy), three units (including the ecclesiastical charge of building) and eight Commissions (armed forces and prisons, Migrants, Theology, Canon Law, Justice and Peace, Ecumenism, Consecrated Life).

== List of presidents ==
1969–1970: Placidus Nkalanga, Bishop of the Roman Catholic Diocese of Bukoba

1970–1976: James Dominic Sangu, Bishop of Roman Catholic Archdiocese of Mbeya

1976–1982: Mario Epifanio Abdallah Mgulunde, Bishop of the Roman Catholic Diocese of Iringa, later Archbishop of Tabora

1982–1988: Anthony Mayala, Bishop of the Roman Catholic Diocese of Musoma

1988–1994: Josaphat Louis Lebulu, Bishop of Arusha, later Archbishop of Roman Catholic Archdiocese of Arusha

1994–2000: Justin Tetmu Samba, Bishop of the Roman Catholic Diocese of Musoma

2000–2006: Severine Niwemugizi, Bishop of Rulenge-Ngara

2006–2012: Jude Thaddaeus Ruwa'ichi, Archbishop of Roman Catholic Archdiocese of Mwanza, later Archbishop of Roman Catholic Archdiocese of Dar es Salaam

2012–2018: Tarcisius Ngalalekumtwa, Bishop of Roman Catholic Diocese of Iringa

2018–2024: Gervas John Mwasikwabhila Nyaisonga, Archbishop of Roman Catholic Archdiocese of Mbeya

2024–present: Wolfgang Pisa, Bishop of Roman Catholic Diocese of Lindi
