= Roman Catholic Archdiocese of Songea =

Roman Catholic archdiocese in Tanzania, Africa

Coordinates: 10.6794°S 35.6462°E

Archdiocese of Songea Archidioecesis Songeana

Location
- Country: Tanzania
- Territory: Songea
- Ecclesiastical province: Archdiocese of Songea

Information
- Denomination: Catholic
- Sui iuris church: Latin Church
- Rite: Roman Rite
- Established: November 12, 1913
- Cathedral: St. Mathias Mulumba Kalemba Metropolitan Cathedral

Current leadership
- Pope: Leo XIV
- Archbishop: Damian Denis Dallu
- Bishops emeritus: Norbert Wendelin Mtega

The Roman Catholic Archdiocese of Songea (Latin: Archidioecesis Songeana) is the Metropolitan See for the ecclesiastical province of Songea in Tanzania.

== History ==
- 12 November 1913: Established as Apostolic Prefecture of Lindi from the Apostolic Vicariate of Dar-es-Salaam
- 15 December 1927: Promoted as Diocese of Lindi
- 23 December 1931: Demoted as Territorial Abbacy of Peramiho
- 6 February 1969: Promoted as Diocese of Songea

== Special churches ==
The seat of the archbishop is at the St. Mathias Mulumba Kalemba Metropolitan Cathedral in Songea.

== Bishops ==
=== Ordinaries ===
- Prefects Apostolic of Lindi (Latin Church)
  - Willibrord Lay (1913–1922)
- Territorial Abbots of Peramiho (Roman rite)
  - Gallus Steiger (22 February 1922 – 6 December 1952)
  - Eberhard Spiess (9 September 1953 – 6 February 1969)
  - Emmanuel Mapunda (8 August 1965 – 6 February 1986)
- Bishop of Songea (Latin Church)
  - James Joseph Komba (6 February 1969 – 18 November 1987)
- Metropolitan Archbishops of Songea (Latin Church)
  - James Joseph Komba (18 November 1987 – 1 February 1992)
  - Norbert Wendelin Mtega (6 July 1992 – 15 May 2013)
  - Damian Denis Dallu (14 March 2014 –)

=== Auxiliary bishop ===
- James Joseph Komba (1961–1969), appointed Bishop here

=== Other priest of this diocese who became bishop ===
- Emmanuel A. Mapunda, appointed Bishop of Mbinga in 1986

== Suffragan dioceses ==
- Lindi
- Mbinga
- Mtwara
- Njombe
- Tunduru–Masasi

== See also ==
- Roman Catholicism in Tanzania

== Sources ==
- GCatholic.org
- Archdiocese of Songea website
- Catholic Hierarchy
