= Catholic Church in Tanzania =

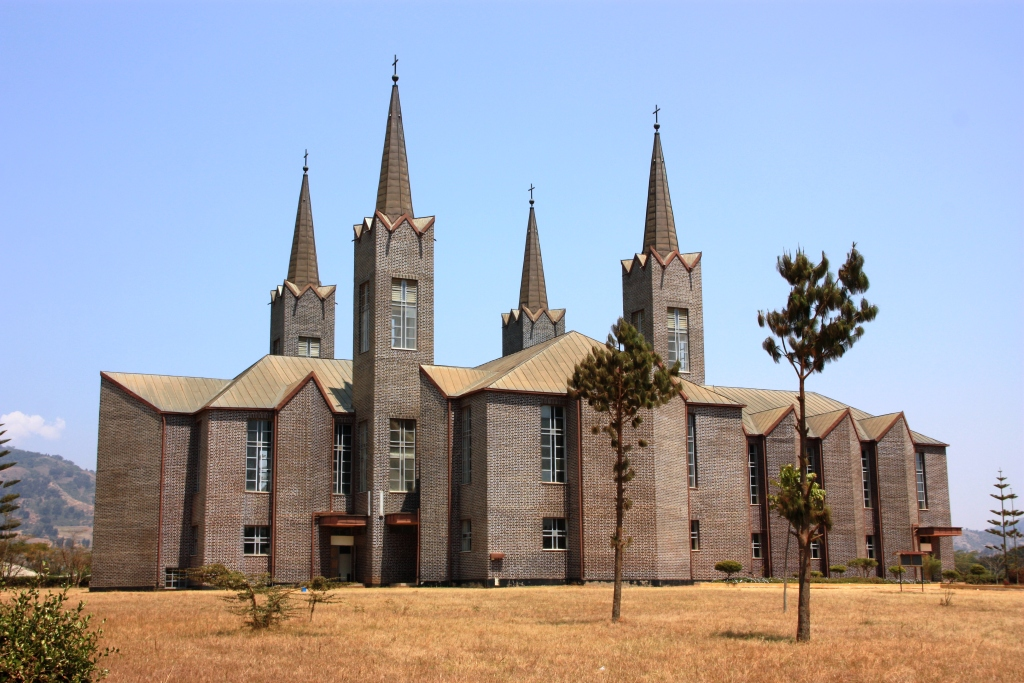
Catholic Church in Mbulu

The Catholic Church in Tanzania is part of the worldwide Catholic Church, under the spiritual leadership of the Pope in Rome.

There are more than 23 million Catholics in the country, nearly one third of the total population.

== Ecclesial structure ==
There are 38 dioceses, including 7 archdioceses:

- The Ecclesiastical Province of Arusha:
  - Arusha
  - Mbulu
  - Moshi
  - Same
- The Ecclesiastical Province of Dar-es-Salaam:
  - Dar-es-Salaam
  - Bagamoyo
  - Ifakara
  - Mahenge
  - Morogoro
  - Tanga
  - Zanzibar
- The Ecclesiastical Province of Dodoma:
  - Dodoma
  - Kondoa
  - Singida
- The Ecclesiastical Province of Mbeya:
  - Mbeya
  - Iringa
  - Sumbawanga
  - Mafinga
- The Ecclesiastical Province of Mwanza:
  - Mwanza
  - Bariadi
  - Bukoba
  - Bunda
  - Geita
  - Kayanga
  - Musoma
  - Rulenge-Ngara
  - Shinyanga
- The Ecclesiastical Province of Songea:
  - Songea
  - Lindi
  - Mbinga
  - Mtwara
  - Njombe
  - Tunduru–Masasi
- The Ecclesiastical Province of Tabora:
  - Tabora
  - Nzega
  - Kahama
  - Kigoma
  - Mpanda
