= 2022 in East Africa =

The following lists events that happened during 2022 in East Africa. The countries listed are those described in the United Nations geoscheme for East Africa: Burundi, Comoros, Djibouti, Eritrea, Ethiopia, Kenya, Madagascar, Malawi, Mauritius, (France) Mayotte, Mozambique, (France) Réunion, Rwanda, Seychelles, Somalia, South Sudan, Tanzania, Uganda, Zambia, Zimbabwe.

== Incumbents ==
=== Burundi ===
Burundi

- Chief of state and Head of government: President Évariste Ndayishimiye, (since 2020).
- First Vice President: Gaston Sindimwo (since 2015)
- Second Vice President: Joseph Butore (since 2015)

=== Comoros ===
Comoros

- Chief of state and Head of government: President Azali Assoumani (since 2016)

Comoros also claims the island of Mayotte.

=== Djibouti ===
Djibouti

- Chief of state: President Ismail Omar Guelleh (since 1999)
- Head of government: Prime Minister Abdoulkader Kamil Mohamed (since 2013)

=== Eritrea ===
Eritrea

- Chief of state and Head of government: President Isaias Afwerki (since 1993)

=== Ethiopia ===
Ethiopia

- Chief of state: President Sahle-Work Zewde (since 2018)
- Head of government: Prime Minister Abiy Ahmed (since 2018)
  - Deputy Prime Minister Demeke Mekonnen (since 2012)

=== Kenya ===
Kenya

- Chief of state and Head of government: President Uhuru Kenyatta (since 2013)
  - Deputy President: William Ruto (since 2013)

=== Madagascar ===
Madagascar

- Chief of state: President Andry Rajoelina (since 2019)
- Head of government: Prime Minister Christian Ntsay (since 2018)

=== Malawi ===
Malawi

- Chief of state and Head of government: President Lazarus Chakwera (starting 2020)
  - Vice-President Saulos Chilima (since 2020)

=== Mauritius ===
Mauritius

- Chief of state: President Prithvirajsing Roopun (since 2019)
- Head of government: Prime Minister Pravind Jugnauth (since 2017)

Mauritius claims sovereignty over the Chagos Archipelago (including Diego Garcia), although this claim is disputed by the UK.

=== Mayotte ===
Mayotte is an overseas department and region of France.

- Chief of state: President of France Emmanuel Macron (since 2017)
- Head of government: Prime Minister of France Édouard Philippe (since 2017)
- President of the Departmental Council Soibahadine Ibrahim Ramadani (since 2015)

Mayotte is an overseas department and region of France also claimed by Comoros.

=== Mozambique ===
Mozambique

- Chief of state: President Filipe Nyusi (since 2015)
- Head of government: Prime Minister Carlos Agostinho do Rosário (since 2015)

=== Réunion ===
Réunion is an overseas department and region of France.

- Chief of state: President Emmanuel Macron (since 2017)
- Head of government: Prime Minister of France: Jean Castex (since 2020)
- President of the Regional Council: Huguette Bello (since 2021)

=== Rwanda ===
Rwanda

- Chief of state: President Paul Kagame (since 2000)
- Head of government: Prime Minister Édouard Ngirente (since 2017)

=== Seychelles ===
Seychelles

- Chief of state and Head of government: President Wavel Ramkalawan (starting 2020).
- Vice-President: Ahmed Afif (starting October 26, 2020)

=== Somalia ===
Somalia

- Chief of state: President Mohamed Abdullahi Mohamed (since 2017)
- Head of government: Prime Minister> Mohamed Hussein Roble (starting 2020)

==== Somaliland ====
Somaliland

The Republic of Somaliland Is a De facto independent state that declared independence from Somalia in 1991.

- Chief of state and head of government: President Muse Bihi Abdi
  - Vice President: Abdirahman Saylici
- Speaker of the House: Bashe Mohamed Farah
- Chairman of Elders: Suleiman Mohamoud Adan
- Chief Justice: Adan Haji Ali

=== South Sudan ===
South Sudan

- Chief of state and Head of government: President Salva Kiir (since 2011)
  - First Vice-President Taban Deng Gai (since 2016)
  - Second Vice President James Wani Igga (since 2016)

=== Tanzania ===
Tanzania

- Chief of state and Head of government: President: Samia Suluhu (since 2021)
  - Vice-President: Philip Mpango (since 2021)
- Head of government: Prime Minister: Kassim Majaliwa (since 2015)

=== Uganda ===
Uganda

- Chief of state: President, Yoweri Museveni (since 1988)
  - Vice President: Edward Ssekandi (since 2011)
- Head of government: Prime Minister Ruhakana Rugunda (since 2014)
  - First Deputy Prime Minister: Moses Ali (since 2016)
  - Second Deputy Prime Minister Kirunda Kivenjinja (since 2016)

=== Zambia ===
Zambia

- Chief of state and Head of government: President, Hakainde Hichilema (since 2021)
  - Vice-President Mutale Nalumango (since 2021)

=== Zimbabwe ===
Zimbabwe

- Chief of state: President Emmerson Mnangagwa (since 2017)
  - Vice-President: Constantino Chiwenga (since 2017)

== Events ==
Ongoing – Afar–Somali clashes, COVID-19 pandemic in Africa, Gedeo–Oromo clashes, Metekel conflict, Oromo–Somali clashes, Puntland-Somaliland dispute, Somali Civil War, Tigray War

== Scheduled Events ==
=== Elections ===
- August 9 – 2022 Kenyan general election
- June 20 – Rwandan 2022 Commonwealth Heads of Government Meeting
- November 26 – 2022 Somaliland presidential election

==== Unknown date ====
- 2022 Somali presidential election

=== Holidays ===
==== January and February ====
- January 1 – New Year's Day, (Gregorian calendar)
- January 7 – Orthodox Christmas, Public holidays in Eritrea and Public holidays in Ethiopia
- January 12 – Zanzibar Revolution Day, Public holidays in Tanzania.
- January 15 – John Chilembwe Day, Public holidays in Malawi.
- January 26 – National Resistance Movement Day, Public holidays in Uganda.
- January 28 – Thaipusam, Public holidays and festivals in Mauritius (Tamil Hindu holiday).
- February 1 – Heroes' Day, Public holidays in Rwanda.
- February 3 – Heroes' Day, Public holidays in Mozambique.
- February 16 – Janani Luwum Day, Uganda.
- February 22 – Robert Mugabe National Youth Day, Public holidays in Zimbabwe.

==== March and April ====
- March 2 – Victory at Adwa Day, Ethiopia.
- March 3 – Martyrs' Day, Malawi.
- March 8 – International Women's Day.
- March 11 – Isra and Mi'raj, Public holidays in Djibouti, the Prophet's Night Journey.
- March 12
  - National Day, Mauritius.
  - Youth Day, Zambia.
- March 18 – Cheikh Al Maarouf Day, Public holidays in the Comoros
- March 29 – Martyrs' Day, Public holidays in Madagascar.
- April 1–3 – Maundy Thursday, Good Friday, Holy Saturday
- April 5 – Easter Monday
- April 7 – Abeid Karume Day, Tanzania.
- April 19 – Independence Day, Zimbabwe.
- April 26 – Union Day, Tanzania.

==== May and June ====
- May 1 – Labour Day or International Workers' Day
- May 5 – Patriots' Victory Day, Ethiopia.
- May 13 – Eid al-Fitr, Muslim feast of breaking of the Fast.
- May 16 – Sudan People's Liberation Army Day, Public holidays in South Sudan.
- May 24 – Independence Day (Eritrea)
- May 25 – Africa Day
- June 1 – Madaraka Day, Public holidays in Kenya.
- June 18 – Constitution Day, Public holidays in Seychelles.
- June 20 – Martyrs' Day (Eritrea)
- June 25 – Independence Day, Mozambique.
- June 26
  - Independence Day, Madagascar.
  - Independence Day, Public holidays in Somalia.
- June 27 – Independence Day, Djibouti.
- June 29 – Independence Day, Seychelles.

==== July and August ====
- July 1
  - Independence Day, Public holiday in Burundi (since 1962)
  - Independence Day, Rwanda (since 1962).
  - Republic Day, Somalia.
- July 4 – Liberation Day (Rwanda).
- July 5 – Heroes' Day, Zambia.
- July 6
  - National Day, Comoros.
  - Independence Day, Malawi.
- July 20 – Eid al-Adha, holiest Islamic feast of the year.
- July 30 – Martyrs' Day, South Sudan.
- August 8 – Nane Nane Day, Tanzania.
- August 15 – Assumption of Mary, Roman Catholic feast in the Seychelles.

==== September and October ====
- September 7 – Victory Day, Mozambique.
- October 9 – Independence Day, Uganda.
- October 11 – Huduma Day, Kenya.
- October 18 – Day of Prayer, Zambia.
- October 25 – Independence Day, Zambia.

==== November and December ====
- November 2 – Indian Arrival Day, Mauritius.
- November 12 – Maore Day, Comoros
- December 9 – Independence Day, Tanzania.
- December 13 – Jamhuri Day, Kenya.
- December 22 – Unity Day, Zimbabwe.
- December 25 – Christmas Day, Western Christian holiday
- December 26 – Boxing Day (Utamaduni Day in Kenya)

== Deaths ==
=== January ===
- January 2
  - Charles Njonjo, 101, Attorney General of Kenya from 1963 to 1979, pneumonia
  - Richard Leakey, 77, Kenyan paleoanthropologist and conservationist, unspecified death

=== March ===
- March 3 – Abune Merkorios, 83, fourth Patriarch of the Ethiopian Orthodox Tewahedo Church, unspecified death
- March 11 – Rupiah Banda, 85, 4th President of Zambia, colon cancer
- March 12 – Karl Offmann, 81, 3rd President of Mauritius, unspecified death
- March 23
  - Amina Mohamed Abdi, 40, Somali politician, victim of March 2022 Somalia attacks
  - Hassan Dhuhul, unknown age, Somali politician, victim of March 2022 Somalia attacks

=== April ===
- April 21 – Mwai Kibaki, 90, 3rd President of Kenya, unspecified death

== See also ==
- 2021–22 South-West Indian Ocean cyclone season
- 2022–23 South-West Indian Ocean cyclone season
- 2022 in Middle Africa
- 2022 in North Africa
- 2022 in Southern Africa
- 2022 in West Africa
- 2020s
- 2020s in political history
- Grand Ethiopian Renaissance Dam
- African Union
- Common Market for Eastern and Southern Africa
- International Organisation of La Francophonie (OIF)
- East African Community
- Southern African Development Community
- Community of Sahel–Saharan States
- War in Darfur
- Tigray War
