= Abdallah Nyangalio =

Tanzanian tailor

Abdallah Nyangalio is a Tanzanian tailor. Due to his visual impairment, he became known for his ability to perform his job after losing his sight.

== Biography ==
Abdallah Nyangalio is the eldest of four children. Owing to financial constraints, he was unable to pursue secondary education and instead worked selling secondhand clothes. At the age of 30, he underwent surgery to reduce eye pressure caused by hypertension, which resulted in the loss of his vision.

Concerned about becoming a burden to his family, Abdallah Nyangalio consulted a Russian doctor based in Dar es Salaam. Although the doctor informed him that his sight could not be restored, she offered to teach him tailoring as a form of rehabilitation and professional reintegration. After a couple months of training and practice, Nyangalio produced his first clothing designs, relying on touch and memorization. The first garment was a pair of trousers, which he had tried to shorten but initially mis-cut (they ended too high above the knee), then re-sewed them, and when he wore them, people complimented the style.

His work gradually gained recognition in Dar es Salaam and other parts of Tanzania, leading him to become a tailor for political leaders, including former President Jakaya Kikwete, members of parliament, and other dignitaries. Additionally, his clothing has been presented on the runways of Swahili Fashion Week on several occasions.

Abdallah Nyangalio is the founder of Anaa Fashion Centre, a training centre located at the Sabasaba International Trade Fair Grounds in Dar es Salaam. In partnership with Buguruni ward councillor Nuru Awadh, the centre was launched with support from local authorities and partners including the Tanzania Trade Development Authority (TanTrade). The centre provides sewing training to both visually impaired and non-visually impaired students; visually impaired students attend the three-month course free of charge, while others pay a fee.
