= 2027 in Tanzania =

- Decades: 2000s; 2010s; 2020s
- See also: Other events of 2027; Timeline of Tanzanian history

Events in the year 2027 in Tanzania.

== Events ==
- 19 June – 17 July – The 2027 Africa Cup of Nations (AFCON 2027) in Kenya, Uganda, and Tanzania
- TBA – Miss World 2027

== Holidays ==
- 1 January – New Year's Day
- 12 January – Zanzibar Revolution
- 9 March – Eid al-Fitr
- 26 March – Good Friday
- 28 March – Easter
- 29 March – Easter Monday
- 7 April – Karume Day
- 26 April – Union Day
- 1 May – Labour Day
- 16 May – Eid al-Adha
- 7 July – Saba Saba Day
- 8 August – Nane Nane Day
- 14 August – Prophet Muhammad's Birthday
- 14 October – Nyerere Day
- 9 December – Tanzania Independence Day
- 25 December – Christmas Day
- 26 December – Boxing Day
