= Public holidays in Tanzania =

Public holidays in Tanzania are in accordance with the Public Holidays Act, amended among others in December 1964, August 1966, July 2022, and are observed throughout the nation.

== Background ==
The President of Tanzania may declare additional holidays at his or her discretion, as stated in article 3 of the Public Holidays Act, for example, during the general election day. A recent example of this was on 4 November 2015 where President Kikwete announced a national holiday for the next day to celebrate Magufuli winning the presidential election.

Karume day, Saba saba day and Nyerere day do not appear in the Public Holidays Act, and are declared by the President. This happens however traditionally every year.

== General list ==
Date	English name (Names from the Public Holiday Act are in bold, if available)	Swahili name	Notes
1 January	**New Year's Day**	Mwaka mpya	
12 January	**Zanzibar Revolution Day**	Sikukuu ya Mapinduzi ya Zanzibar	Zanzibar Revolution. End of the Sultanate of Zanzibar
7 April	**Karume Day**	Siku ya Karume	Assassination of Zanzibar President Abeid Karume
Friday before Easter	**Good Friday**	Ijumaa Kuu	Crucifixion of Jesus
Monday after Easter	**Easter Monday**	Jumatatu ya Pasaka	The resurrection of Christ
26 April	**Union Day**	Sikukuu ya Muungano	The unification of Tanganyika and the People's Republic of Zanzibar in 1964
1 May	**International Workers' Day**	Sikukuu ya Wafanyakazi	
7 July	**Saba Saba Day**; Dar es Salaam International Trade Fair	Saba Saba	Dar es Salaam International Trade Fair
8 August	**Nane Nane Day** Farmers' Day	Nane Nane	
14 October	**Nyerere Day**	Siku ya Nyerere	Death anniversary of Julius Nyerere, the father of the nation
9 December	**Independence Day**	Siku ya Uhuru	End of British rule in 1961
25 December	**Christmas Day**	Krismasi	Commemoration of the birth of Jesus
26 December	**Boxing Day**	Siku ya kufungua Zawadi	
12 Rabi' al-awwal *	**Mawlid**	Mawlid	Prophet Muhammad’s Birthday
1 Shawwal and 2 Shawwal *	**Idd-el-Fitri**	Idd el Fitri	End of the holy month of Ramadan. Breaking of the Fast. 2 days.
10 Dhu al-Hijja *	**Idd-el-Haji**	Idd el Haji	Feast of Sacrifice
* denotes subject to the sighting of the moon

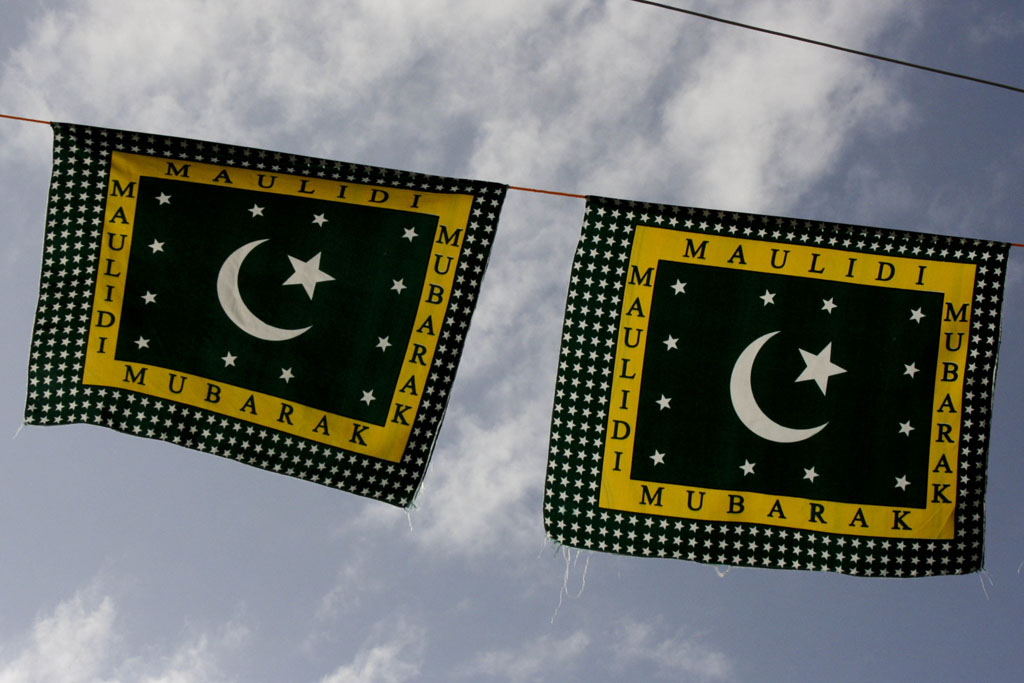
A banner with Maulid greetings in Kisutu, Dar es Salaam.

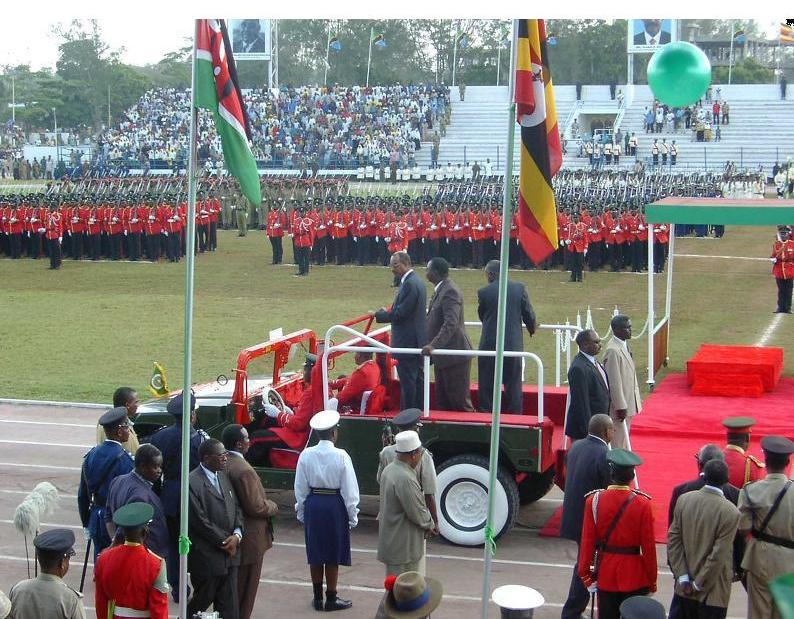
Revolution Day military parade at Amaan Stadium in Unguja, Zanzibar.

== See also ==
- List of holidays by country
- Saba Saba Day
- Nane Nane Day
- Nyerere Day
