= 2026 in Tanzania =

- Decades: 2000s; 2010s; 2020s
- See also: Other events of 2026; Timeline of Tanzanian history

Events of 2026 in Tanzania.

== Incumbents ==
- President: Samia Suluhu Hassan
- Vice-President: Emmanuel Nchimbi (until 4 September)
- Prime Minister: Mwigulu Nchemba
- Chief Justice: Ibrahim Hamis Juma

== Events ==
=== March ===
- 27 March – Landslides triggered by heavy rain kill at least 20 people in Mbeya Region.

=== April ===
- 30 April – Tanzania closes down the Nduta Refugee Camp hosting refugees from Burundi.

=== May ===
- 21 May – The United States imposes sanctions on Faustine Jackson Mafwele, the Senior Assistant Commissioner of the Tanzania Police Force, citing human rights violations committed by the agency.

=== June ===
- 26 June – Interior Minister Patrobas Katambi announces a nationwide ban on all political rallies, less than two weeks before planned youth-led protests on 7 July calling for democratic reforms and justice over deaths linked to the 2025 Tanzanian election protests.

=== July ===
- 9 July – Police announce the arrest of 130 people for allegedly "inciting criminal acts" after heavy security deployments prevent the planned opposition protests two days earlier.

=== August ===
- 26 August – Vice President Nchimbi resigns less than a year after taking office for undisclosed reasons. The ruling CCM party nominates energy minister Deogratius Ndejembi to replace him.

=== October ===
- 9 October – A passenger bus collides with a timber truck in Mkambarani, killing at least 28 people.
- 28 October – Energy Minister Juma Homera announces the discovery of a natural gas field with potential reserves of 223,000,000,000 ft^{3} (6.3×10^{9} m^{3}) in Mnazi Bay.

== Holidays ==
- 1 January – New Year's Day
- 12 January – Zanzibar Revolution
- 30 March – Eid al-Fitr
- 7 April – Karume Day
- 18 April – Good Friday
- 20 April – Easter
- 21 April – Easter Monday
- 26 April – Union Day
- 1 May – Labour Day
- 6 June – Eid al-Adha
- 7 July – Saba Saba Day
- 8 August – Nane Nane Day
- 4 September – Prophet Muhammad's Birthday
- 14 October – Nyerere Day
- 9 December – Tanzania Independence Day
- 25 December – Christmas Day
- 26 December – Boxing Day

== Deaths ==
- 19 February – Polycarp Pengo, 81, Roman Catholic cardinal, coadjutor archbishop (1990–1992) and archbishop (1992–2019) of Dar-es-Salaam
- 20 March – Julie Manning, 87, lawyer, judge, and politician
- 25 March – William Lukuvi, 70, presidential adviser, MP (since 2015) and minister of lands (2015–2022)
- 30 March – Selemani Bungara, 64, MP (2010–2020)
- 14 April – Bernardin Mfumbusa, 64, Roman Catholic prelate, bishop of Kondoa (since 2011)
- 7 September – Hafidh Ameir Hassan, 76, agriculturalist, first gentleman (since 2021)
- 21 September – Fatma Karume, 97, first lady of Zanzibar (1964–1972)
