= 2022 in Southern Africa =

The following lists events that happened during 2022 in Southern Africa. The countries are those described in the United Nations geoscheme for Southern Africa.

== Incumbents ==
=== Botswana ===
Botswana

- President of Botswana: Mokgweetsi Masisi (since 2018)
  - Vice-President of Botswana: Slumber Tsogwane (since 2018)

=== Eswatini ===
Eswatini (Swaziland)

- Chief of state: Ngwenyama (King): Mswati III (since 1986)
- Head of government: Prime Minister: Cleopas Dlamini (since 2021)

=== Lesotho ===
Lesotho

- Chief of state: King: Letsie III (since 1996)
- Head of government: Prime Minister: Moeketsi Majoro (since 2020)

=== Namibia ===
Namibia

- President: Hage Geingob (since March 21, 2015)
  - Vice President: Nangolo Mbumba (since February 12, 2018)
- Prime Minister: Saara Kuugongelwa (since March 21, 2015)
  - Deputy Prime Minister: Netumbo Nandi-Ndaitwah (since March 21, 2015)

=== South Africa ===
South Africa

- President: Cyril Ramaphosa (since 2018)
  - Deputy President: David Mabuza (since 2018)
- Chief Justice: Raymond Zondo (since 2022)
- Speaker of the National Assembly: Nosiviwe Mapisa-Nqakula

== Elections ==
- 9 April – 2022 Gambian parliamentary election
- 10 July – 2022 Republic of the Congo parliamentary election
- 31 July – 2022 Senegalese parliamentary election
- 9 August – 2022 Kenyan general election
- 24 August – 2022 Angolan general election
- 25 September – 2022 São Toméan legislative election
- 7 October – 2022 Lesotho general election
- 13 November – 2022 Somaliland presidential election
- 17 December – 2022 Tunisian parliamentary election

=== Major holidays ===
- March 11 – Anniversary of the death of King Moshoeshoe I, Public holidays in Lesotho.
- March 22 – Independence Day, Public holidays in Namibia.
- March 23 – Southern African Liberation Day, Public holidays in Angola.
- April 19 – King Mswati III′s Birthday, Public holidays in Eswatini.
- April 27 – Freedom Day (South Africa), Public holidays in South Africa.
- May 4 – Cassinga Day, Namibia.
- May 25 – Africa Day.
- July 17 – King Letsie III′s Birthday, Lesotho.
- July 22 – King Father′s Birthday, Eswatini.
- September 6 – Somhlolo Day (Independence Day), Eswatini.
- October 1 – Botswana Day holiday
- October 4 – Independence Day, Lesotho.
- November 11 – Independence Day, Angola.
- December 10 – Human Rights Day.
- December 16 – Day of Reconciliation, South Africa.

== Sports ==
- 2022–23 CAF Champions League
- 2022–23 CAF Confederation Cup
  - 2022–23 CAF Confederation Cup qualifying rounds

== Deaths ==
- 17 July – Jessie Duarte, 68, politician and acting secretary-general of the African National Congress.

== See also ==
- 2021–22 South-West Indian Ocean cyclone season
- 2022–23 South-West Indian Ocean cyclone season
- Southern African Development Community
- 2022 in East Africa
- 2022 in Middle Africa
- 2022 in North Africa
- 2022 in South Africa
- 2022 in West Africa
- 2020s
- 2020s in political history
- Common Market for Eastern and Southern Africa
- Southern African Development Community
