= Ibrahim Saidi Rashidi Msabaha =

Tanzanian politician (1951–2024)

Ibrahim Saidi Rashidi Msabaha (19 February 1951 – 13 February 2024) was a Tanzanian politician who was a member of parliament for Kibaha state in the national parliament in Tanzania. He was a member of the CCM party. Msabaha died on 13 February 2024, at the age of 72.

== See also ==
- List of Tanzania National Assembly members 2005–2010
