= John Khaminwa =

Kenyan lawyer (born 1936)

- Born: Umira Kager, Kenya
- Citizenship: Kenya
- Occupation: Lawyer
- Years active: 1973-present

John Khaminwa is a Kenyan lawyer.

== Early life and education ==
Khaminwa was born in Kenya. He is an alumnus of the University of Dar es Salaam, where he graduated with a bachelor's degree in law. He also acquired an external law degree at the University of London. Khaminwa earned his master's degree in international law from the New York University School of Law.

== Career ==
Khaminwa began practicing law in 1973 and has since participated in several major legal cases in Kenya. He has represented political figures such as Raila Odinga, Kenneth Matiba, and George Anyona. He has been involved in cases addressing issues such as human rights and governance.
