= Dar es Salaam International Trade Fair =

Trade fair in Tanzania

The Dar es Salaam International Trade Fair (DITF), also known as Saba Saba Day, takes place annually on the seventh of July at the Mwalimu J.K.Nyerere Trade Fair Grounds. It is located along Kilwa Road, 8 km south east of Dar es Salaam in Tanzania.

The Dar es Salaam International Trade Fair is an annual major promotional event organised by the Board of External Trade. The Board of External Trade is a government institution, which was established under the Act No. 5 of 1978 to spearhead Tanzania' s Export endeavours.

The Trade Fair Grounds which is also known as Mwl. J.K.Nyerere Trade Fair Grounds were inaugurated in 1962, one year after Tanzania gained her independence on 9 December 1961. The Grounds at that time were under the Ministry of Trade and Co-operative Unions and the fair was known as the National Agricultural and Trade Fair (NATF).

== History ==
The first trade fair was held in 1963. It was organised by an expert from UKin the Ministry of Trade and Cooperative Unions by the name Mr. Lucas, with the assistance of Mr. Mashamba who was an official of the Ministry.

The Dar es Salaam International Trade Fair has established itself over years as the shop window for Tanzanian products as well as the East, Central and the Southern African Region. Supported by the services of the Dar es Salaam harbour which serves the region effectively, the fair acts as one stop centre for reaching countries such as Kenya, Uganda, Rwanda, Burundi, Democratic Republic of Congo, Zambia, Malawi, Zimbabwe and Botswana.

The fairs enjoys patronage of the Tanzanian business community who both exhibit and use it as a forum for business exchange.

Participation has ever been on the increase from a mere over 100 companies in the late eighties to over 1041 companies in 1999. In 2006 a total of 1526 exhibitors exhibited at the fair and came from overseas representing over 18 countries, Tanzania inclusive.

The fair enjoys support of the Government through the Ministry of Industry, Trade and Marketing. The fair is also supported by the Tanzania Chamber of Commerce, Industry and Agriculture (TCCIA) and the Confederation of Tanzania Industries (CTI) as well as other institutions in the country, such like Meridian Sport.

Number of Exhibitors in 2006 were as follows: Total 1,526 Local 1,400 Foreign 108 Countries Represented 18 Size of Exhibition: Gross Area – 160,000 m^{2} Net Exhibition – 35,000 m^{2} (Covered and Open).

== Exhibitors Profile ==
The range of exhibits includes the following;

1. Agricultural products - Food and Beverages.
2. Textiles, garments and yarns.
3. Manufactured products.
4. Information and Communication Technology.
5. Construction materials
6. Automobiles
7. Goods transport service providers
8. Passenger transport service providers
9. Electrical goods and appliances
10. Farm implements
11. Chemicals and cosmetics.
12. Timber and furniture
13. Trade services
14. Engineering products
15. Machinery
16. Computer software
17. Gift articles and handicrafts
18. Etc.

== Prohibited Exhibits ==
The following are prohibited: Arms and Ammunition, Drugs, Political and Religious Affairs.

== Visitors Profiles ==
Visitors are mainly: Consumers and Traders, Importers, Wholesalers, Agents, Business Executives, General Public, and VIPs.

== Visitors 2006 ==
1. General public -450,000
2. Business visitors (est) - 5,000
3. Overseas visitors (est) - 4,000

== 2008 to 2009 Dar es Salaam International Trade Fair Participation Summary ==
In 2009, a total of 23 countries were represented at the Dar es Salaam International Trade Fair in the Mwalimu J. K. Nyerere fair grounds, compared to 27 countries in 2008. The decline in representation was caused by the world economic crisis. A total of 2,103 exhibitors participated in the trade fair in 2009 compared to 1,930 exhibitors in 2008. Out of that, 1,760 exhibitors were locals while 343 exhibitors were foreigners compared to 1,602 local exhibitors and 328 foreigners in 2008. The increase in local exhibitors was attributed by the increase in participation of Ministries and Government Institutions.
