= 2022–23 South-West Indian Ocean cyclone season =

Tropical cyclone season

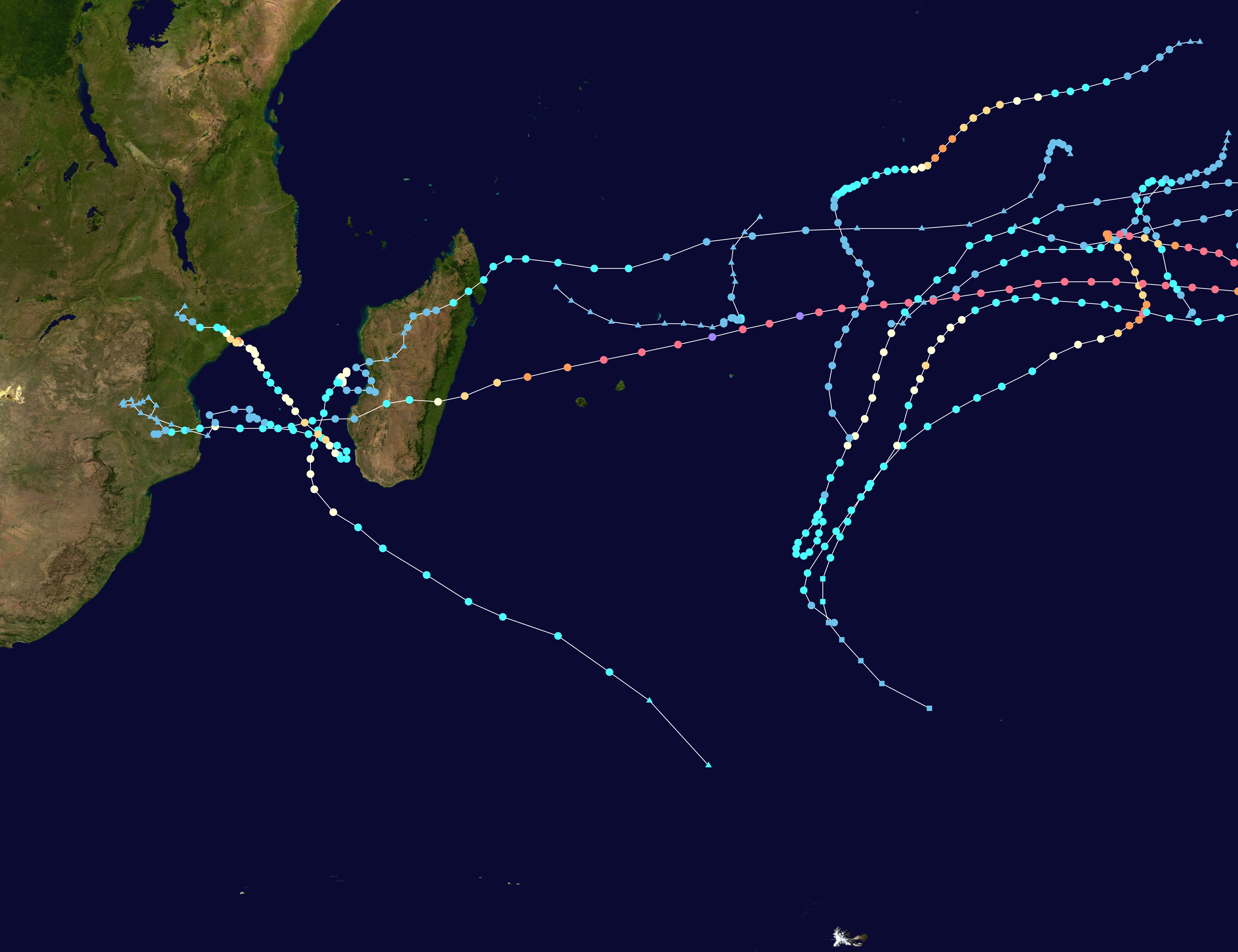
- Season summary map

Seasonal boundaries
- First system formed: 23 September 2022
- Last system dissipated: 25 May 2023

Strongest storm
- By maximum sustained winds: Freddy
  - Maximum winds: 230 km/h (145 mph) (10-minute sustained)
  - Lowest pressure: 927 hPa (mbar)
- By central pressure: Darian
  - Maximum winds: 220 km/h (140 mph) (10-minute sustained)
  - Lowest pressure: 921 hPa (mbar)

Seasonal statistics
- Total disturbances: 10
- Total depressions: 10
- Total storms: 9
- Tropical cyclones: 6
- Intense tropical cyclones: 3
- Very intense tropical cyclones: 2
- Total fatalities: >1,483 total (Second-deadliest South-West Indian Ocean cyclone season on record)
- Total damage: $1.55 billion (2023 USD) (Fourth-costliest South-West Indian Ocean cyclone season on record)

Related articles
- 2022–23 Australian region cyclone season; 2022–23 South Pacific cyclone season

The 2022–23 South-West Indian Ocean cyclone season was a slightly-above average but very destructive season that was one of the costliest and deadliest South-West Indian cyclone seasons on record, mainly due to Cyclone Freddy. It officially began on 15 November 2022, and ended on 30 April 2023, with the exception for Mauritius and the Seychelles, for which it ended on 15 May 2023. These dates conventionally delimit the period of each year when most tropical and subtropical cyclones form in the basin, which is west of 90°E and south of the Equator. However, tropical cyclones can form year-round, and all tropical cyclones that form between 1 July 2022 and 30 June 2023 will be part of the season. Tropical and subtropical cyclones in this basin are monitored by the Regional Specialised Meteorological Centre in Réunion and unofficially by the Joint Typhoon Warning Center. The season was average in terms of the number of systems that formed, with nine systems becoming at least moderate tropical storms, and six reaching tropical cyclone strength. Activity began early, with the first two systems (Ashley and Balita) developing in September and October, and ended late with Fabien in May.

The season featured Cyclone Freddy, which became the longest-lived tropical cyclone on record, beating the previous record of Hurricane John in 1994, and also had the second highest accumulated cyclone energy (ACE) of any tropical cyclone on record worldwide. In addition, Freddy is the only known tropical cyclone to achieve six separate rapid intensification cycles. Additionally, Freddy was the second farthest-traveling tropical cyclone ever observed worldwide, only with 1994's John's. The storm caused devastating impacts in Malawi, which was accounted for 1,216 of the 1,434 deaths of Freddy. The most intense system of the season was Cyclone Darian.

In the month of January, Cyclone Cheneso brought flooding and strong winds to Madagascar. In May, Cyclone Fabien formed close to the equator and became the latest intense tropical cyclone in the satellite era, surpassing Cyclone Billy-Lila of 1986 by six days. Tropical cyclones during this season collectively caused at least 1,483 deaths and more than $1.5 billion in damages. The season was the second-deadliest South-West Indian Ocean cyclone season on record, only behind the 2018-19 season, and the third-costliest on record, behind the 2018-19 and 2024-25 seasons.

== Seasonal forecasts ==
| Source/Record | | Moderate Tropical Storm | Very/Intense Tropical Cyclone |
|---|---|---|---|
| Record high: | | 15 | 9 |
| Record low: | | 3 | 0 |
| Forecast Center | Systems | | |
| Mauritius Meteorological Services | 11–9 tropical cyclones | | |
| Météo-France | 6–10 tropical cyclones | | |
| Forecast Center | Chance of above average | | |
| Météo-France | 30% | 60% | 10% |
Source: Seasonal Outlook for Tropical Cyclones.

In October 2022, Météo-France issued its seasonal forecast of cyclone activity for the basin. The MFR predicted a season that was slightly below average to average, citing the effects of a La Niña event. The MFR placed chances of a below-average season at 60%. Average cyclone activity was given a 30% chance, and an above-average level of activity was given a 10% chance. The season in the South-West Indian Ocean was expected to be near- to below-average, with 6–10 systems of moderate tropical storm intensity or higher.

The Mauritius Meteorological Services (MMS) released their summer 2022–23 outlooks. An average season, with around eleven to nine cyclones forming, was expected. The MMS indicated that the eastern part of the basin would present more favorable conditions for cyclogenesis in the first half of summer, and the western part of the basin would become more conducive to storm formation during the second half of summer.

== Seasonal summary ==
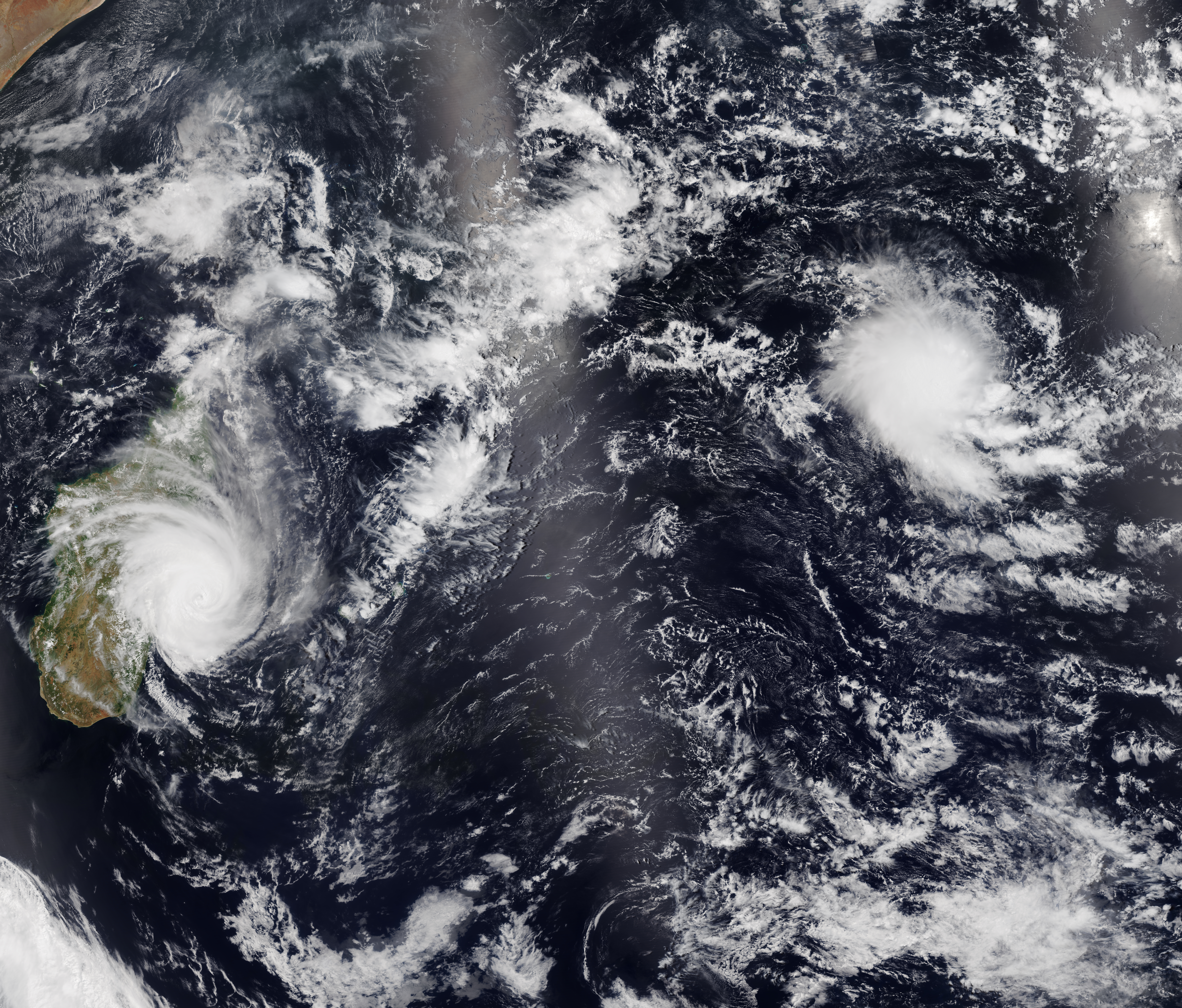
Cyclone Freddy (left) nearing Madagascar and the tropical depression which later developed into Cyclone Enala (right) over the open Indian Ocean on 21 February.

The season began early, with a weak tropical low being produced on 22 September. Improving conditions over the next three days allowed the development of the system, which strengthened into Moderate Tropical Storm Ashley on 27 September. The system slowly moved westward and weakened into a remnant low on 30 September. Pre-season activity continued, with a disturbance being produced as a result of a westerly wind burst. Another storm formed on 6 October, and was named Balita on 8 October. In November 2022, Tropical Low 02U (reclassified the system as Tropical Depression 03) entered the basin and degenerated into a remnant low by the next day. In December, Cyclone Darian (classified as a very intense tropical cyclone) entered the basin, before gradually weakening.

In January 2023, a new disturbance became a tropical depression and was later named Cheneso. The cyclone strengthened to severe tropical storm status before making landfall over Madagascar on 19 January. It re-intensified to Cyclone Cheneso after moving southwestwards as an overland depression status. It was last noted as a subtropical depression on 29 January. In February 2023, Tropical Low 11U from the Australian region moved into this basin, where it was classified as Moderate Tropical Storm Dingani. Although initially struggling to intensify due to wind shear, it gradually intensified and eventually reached tropical cyclone status, before moving southwestwards and dissipated.

Cyclone Freddy moved the Australian area and reached this region, where MFR immediately classed it as a tropical cyclone status. It subsequently strengthened into a very intense tropical cyclone status. Freddy later intensified into a Category 5 tropical cyclone before making landfall over Madagascar. It weakened as it crossed the Mozambique Channel, but it re-intensified to severe tropical storm status before making landfall in Mozambique, it unexpectedly reappeared in the Mozambique Channel. It was upgraded to tropical cyclone status. It weakened but began to re-strengthen when it approached Mozambique, the storm gradually deteriorated and last noted on 14 March. Another tropical depression formed and strengthened into Moderate Tropical Storm Enala, which subsequently evolved into a tropical cyclone and last occurred on 28 February. Another period of inactivity then ensued, until a Moderate Tropical Storm 09 formed and dissipated quickly. In May, Fabien formed close to the equator and became an intense tropical cyclone, which was unusually strong this late in the season before encountering increasing wind shear.

The ACE index for the 2022–23 South-West Indian Ocean cyclone season was at 135.955 units. (Note: As calculated in the Talk Page of the article)

== Systems ==
=== Moderate Tropical Storm Ashley ===
- Moderate tropical storm (MFR)
- Tropical storm (SSHWS)
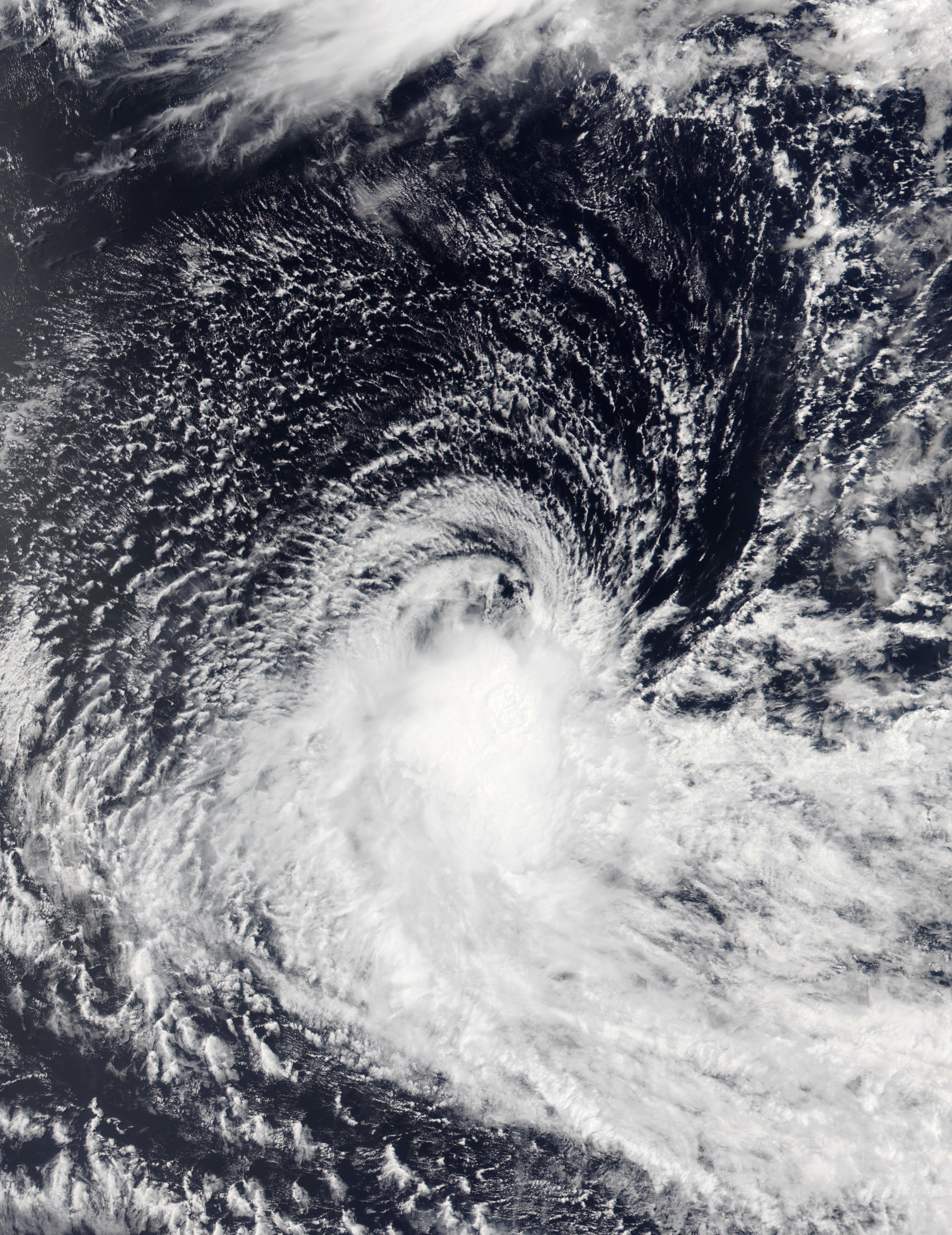
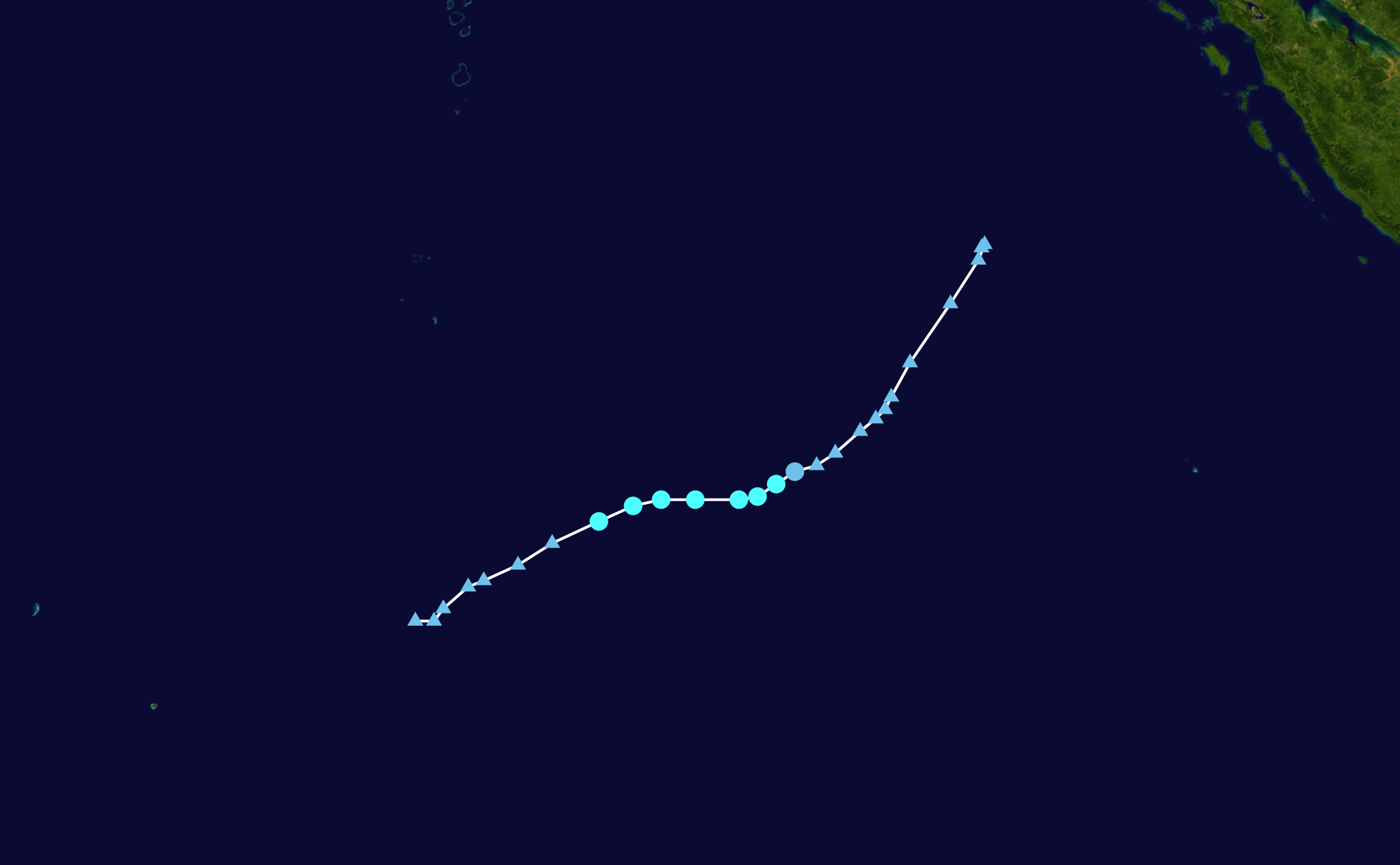
- Duration: 23 September – 28 September
- Peak intensity: 85 km/h (50 mph) (10-min); 995 hPa (mbar)

On 22 September, a near-equatorial trough produced a weak tropical low in the Indian Ocean, initially expected by MFR to not form due to upper wind shear. Environmental conditions improved over the next 3 days, and the low organized enough to become the first tropical depression of the season by 26 September. Early the next day, the JTWC subsequently designated the storm as Tropical Cyclone 02S, citing a scatterometer pass indicating tropical storm-force winds in its western and eastern semicircles. The MFR also upgraded the system into a moderate tropical storm, and the Mauritius Meteorological Services (MMS) named it Ashley. The system then reached peak intensity, with 10-minute sustained winds of 75 km/h (45 mph), before succumbing to strong northeasterly shear and significant dry air intrusions late on the same day, prompting the JTWC to issue their final advisory on Ashley. The MFR terminated advisories by 06:00 UTC on 28 September as Ashley weakened into a remnant low, but continued to track the storm until it was last noted on 30 September as a dissipating low.

=== Moderate Tropical Storm Balita ===
- Moderate tropical storm (MFR)
- Tropical storm (SSHWS)
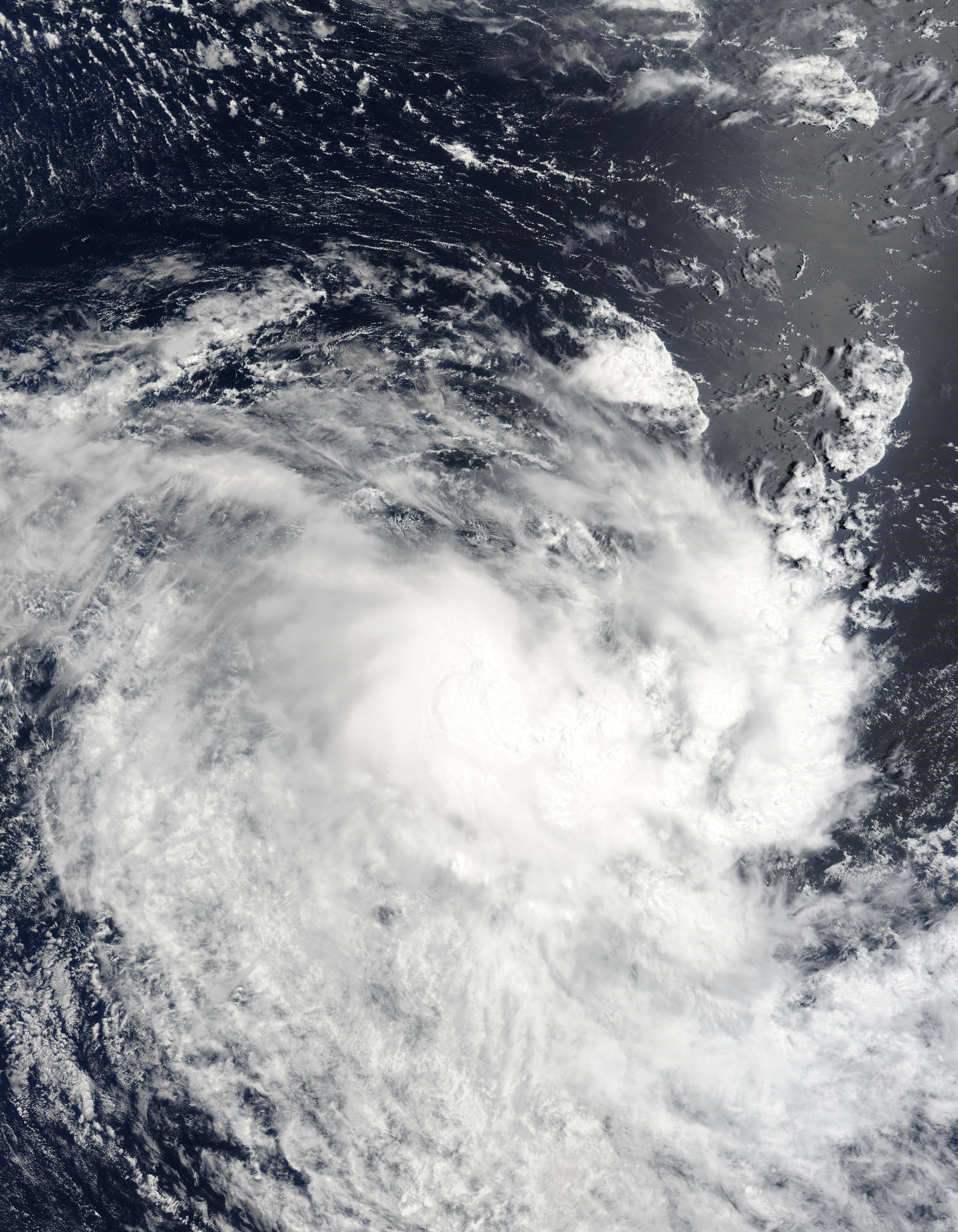
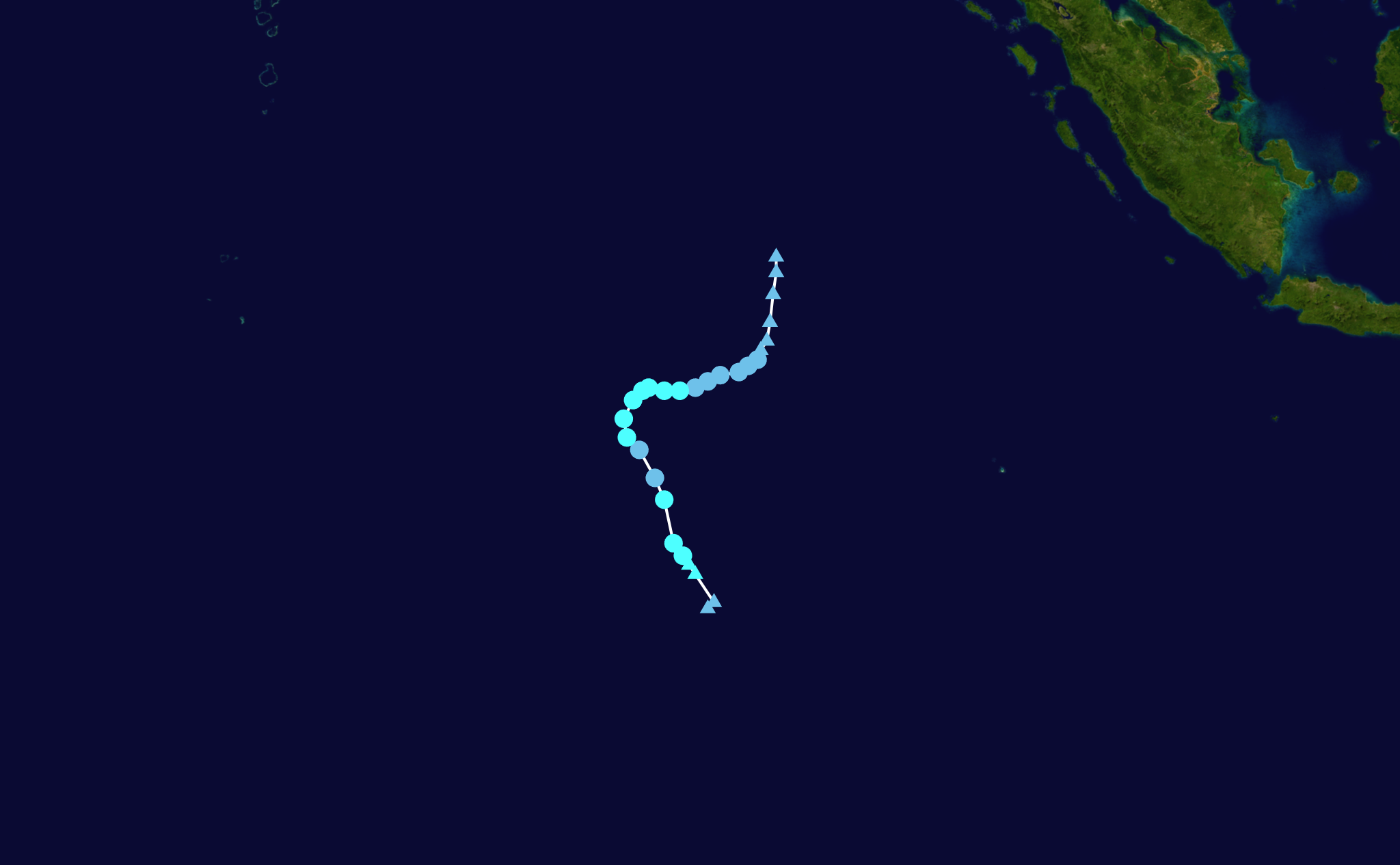
- Duration: 3 October – 9 October
- Peak intensity: 65 km/h (40 mph) (10-min); 996 hPa (mbar)

On 2 October, the MFR began to monitor a disturbance associated with the convergence of the westerly wind burst. However, convective activity was located in the low-level convergences. Later the next day, the JTWC began monitoring an area of convection. Satellite images indicated that the low-level cloud lines wrapping into the low-level center. Early on 5 October, the JTWC issued a Tropical Cyclone Formation Alert on the system. The JTWC subsequently initiated advisories on the system and classified it as Tropical Cyclone 03S at 03:00 UTC on 6 October. By 06:00 UTC, the MFR upgraded it to a tropical depression. An ASCAT pass featured below gale-force winds on its southern quadrant. Despite moderate northeasterly wind shear, convection increased around the system.

The MFR further upgraded it to a moderate tropical storm at 00:00 UTC on 8 October with the name Balita from the MMS. Microwave imagery revealed that Balita had improved its convective structure. At 06:00 UTC on 9 October, Balita's structure became elongated and asymmetrical, prompting MFR to reclassify the storm as a post-tropical depression. Later that same day, the MFR ceased advisories, and the JTWC followed suit. The remnants fully dissipated on 13 October.

=== Tropical Depression 03 ===
- Tropical depression (MFR)
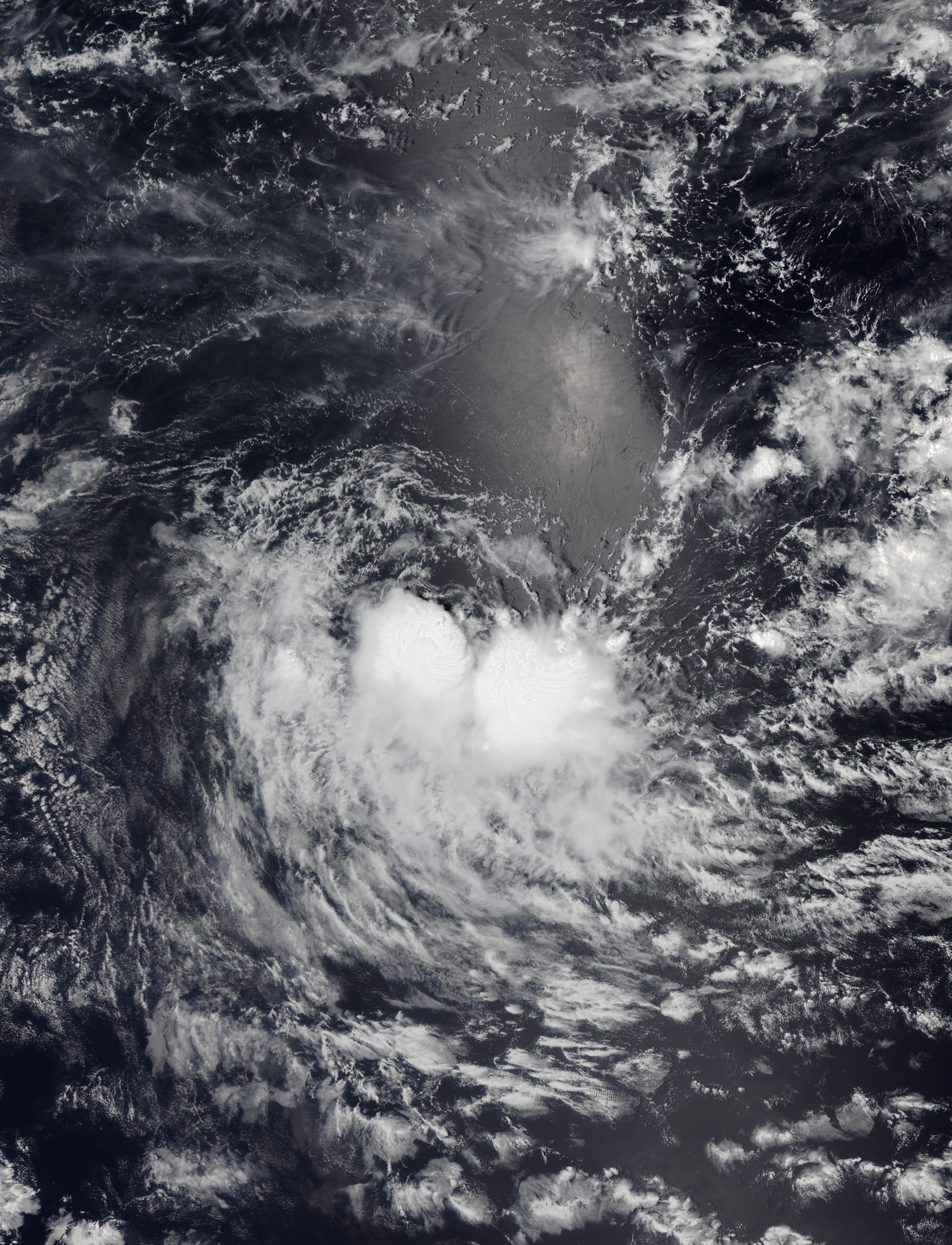
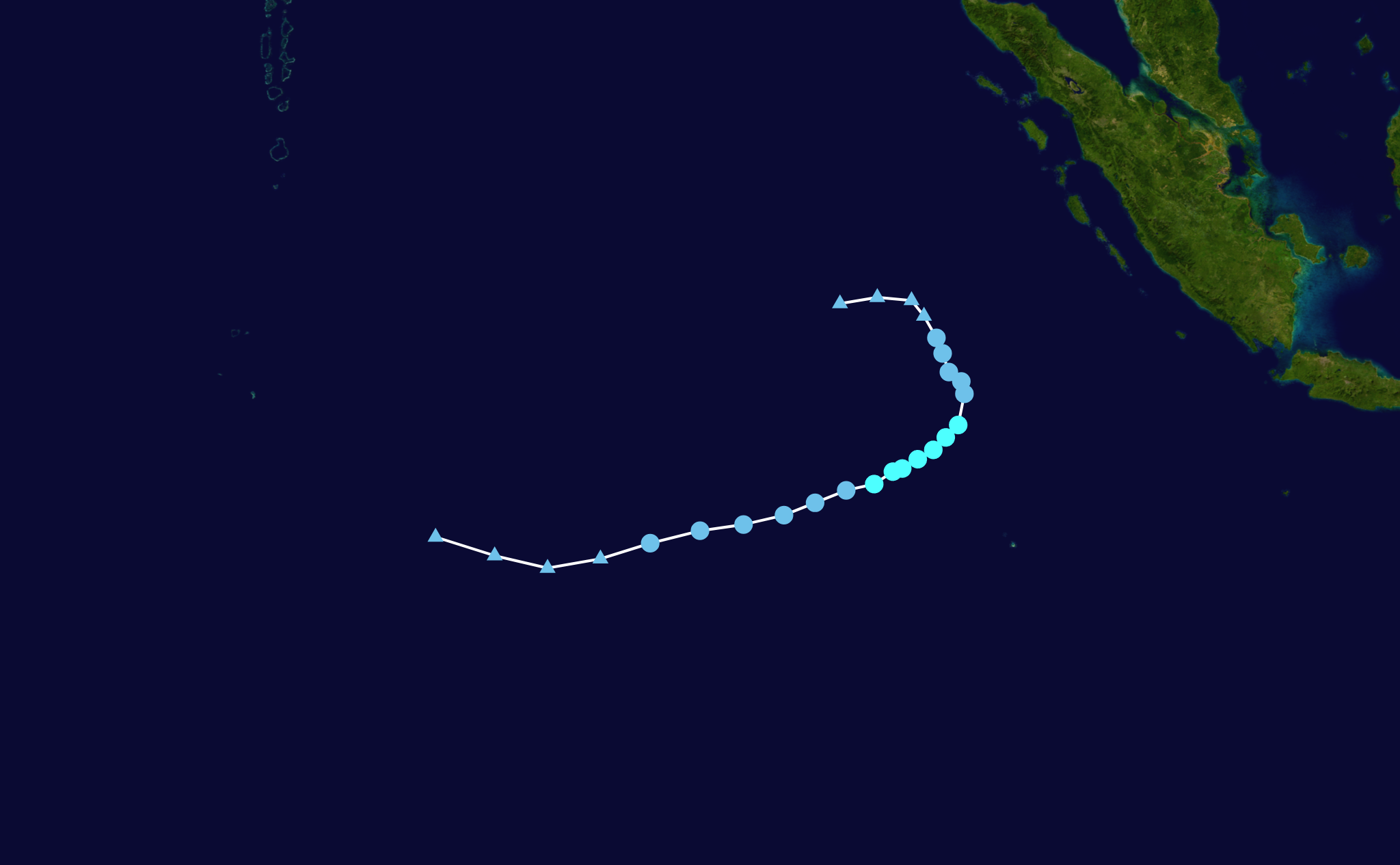
- Duration: 5 November (Entered basin) – 6 November
- Peak intensity: 55 km/h (35 mph) (10-min); 1008 hPa (mbar)

On 5 November, Tropical Low 02U that was being monitored by the MFR crossed into the South-West Indian Ocean basin from the Australian region. At the time, there was no more convection associated, only a low-level vortex. Thunderstorm activity has resumed in the southern part of the system in the last few hours. Upon entering the basin, the JTWC ceased advisories by 09:00 UTC that day. The MFR's reclassified the system as Tropical Depression 03. Environmental conditions were assessed as being marginally conducive for tropical cyclogenesis, with low vertical wind shear and moderate equatorial outflow. At 06:00 UTC on 6 November, the MFR's issued their last warning as the system degenerated into a remnant low.

=== Very Intense Tropical Cyclone Darian ===
- Very intense tropical cyclone (MFR)
- Category 4 tropical cyclone (SSHWS)
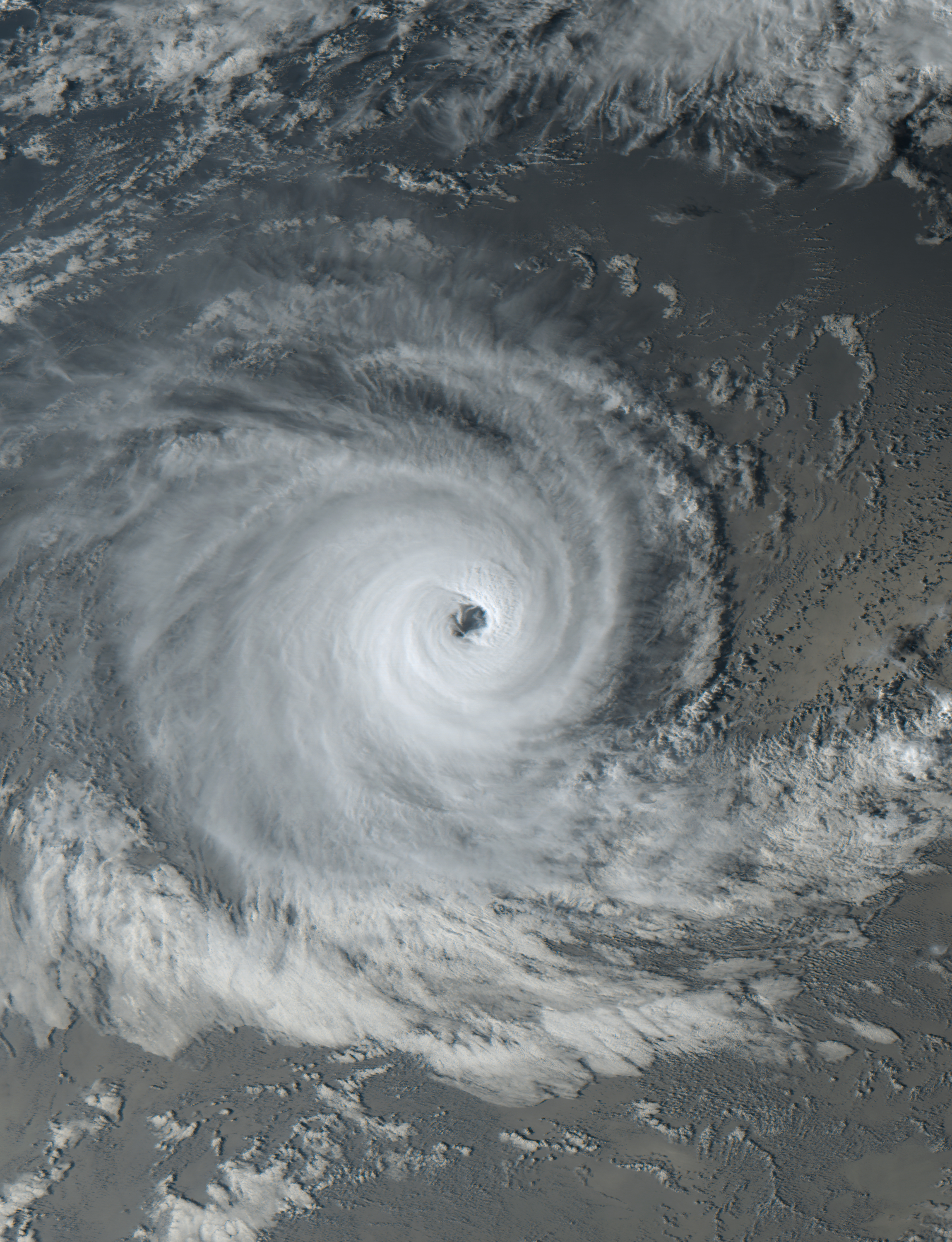
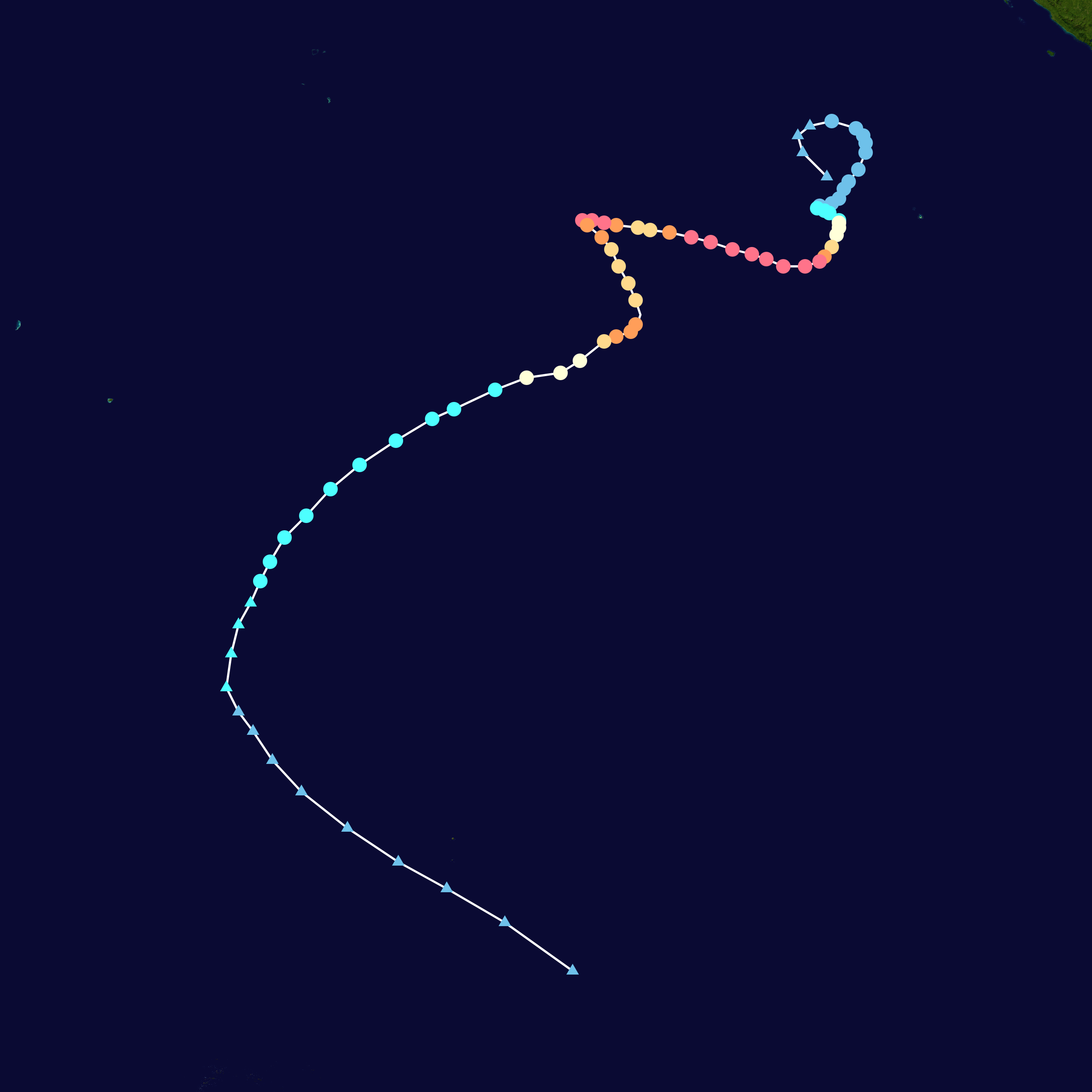
- Duration: 21 December (Entered basin) – 30 December
- Peak intensity: 220 km/h (140 mph) (10-min); 921 hPa (mbar)

On 21 December, Severe Tropical Cyclone Darian moved into the basin from the Australian region, and was immediately classified as a very intense tropical cyclone by MFR. Darian exhibited a highly symmetrical cloud structure around a well-defined eye. Shortly afterward, Darian's cloud pattern deteriorated and its eye started to become less defined, causing the cyclone to weaken to an intense tropical cyclone by 18:00 UTC. Darian weakened to a Category 3-equivalent cyclone the next day, as the convective cloud tops had warmed slightly. Darian's then weakened due to strong wind shear, and was downgraded into a tropical cyclone. With a well-defined eye and impressive appearance on satellite imagery, Darian re-intensified, reaching 10-minute maximum sustained winds of 165 km/h (105 mph) around 06:00 UTC on 23 December. The cyclone was highly compact, with a distinct eye surrounded by cold cloud tops. Around the same time, the JTWC's also assessed Darian as having 1-minute maximum sustained winds of 240 km/h (150 mph), making the storm a Category 4-equivalent cyclone again on the Saffir–Simpson scale (SSHWS). Darian became quasi-stationary due to the presence of two main flows. The cyclone's eye can be seen from satellite imagery, and its cloud tops warmed to −99 to −108 °F (−73 to −78 °C). Steady weakening occurred thereafter as it underwent an eyewall replacement cycle.

Multispectral animated satellite imagery revealed a 8 nautical miles (15 km; 9.2 mi) surrounded eye around deep convection as a result, the cyclone weakened to Category 2-equivalent cyclone. Further weakening occurred as the MFR assessed that Darian's winds bottomed out at 155 km/h (100 mph). At 03:00 UTC on 26 December, the JTWC reported that Darian had re-strengthened to 205 km/h (125 mph) with a warm 14 °F (−10 °C), a wide eye 25 nautical miles (46 km; 29 mi), and was surrounded by cold, −98 to −116 °F (−72 to −82 °C) cloud tops. Using the Dvorak technique, MFR estimated winds of 185 km/h (115 mph). Due to moderate east-northeasterly vertical wind shear, Darian fell to 155 km/h (100 mph) winds, according to MFR. Just six hours later, the eye feature persisted, consisting of a warm area within the cooling eyewall. At 15:00 UTC on 27 December, the JTWC further downgraded it to a Category 1-equivalent cyclone. Satellite imagery showed that the cloud pattern began to rapidly deteriorate, and MFR followed suit and declared it a severe tropical storm. The JTWC also reported that Darian's weakened into a tropical storm. By 00:00 UTC on 29 December, Darian weakened into a moderate tropical storm, after the convection diminished around the center. MFR issued its last advisory on the storm on 30 December as it transitioned into a post-tropical depression. The JTWC also discontinued warnings on the system around 03:00 UTC on 31 December.

=== Tropical Cyclone Cheneso ===
- Tropical cyclone (MFR)
- Category 2 tropical cyclone (SSHWS)
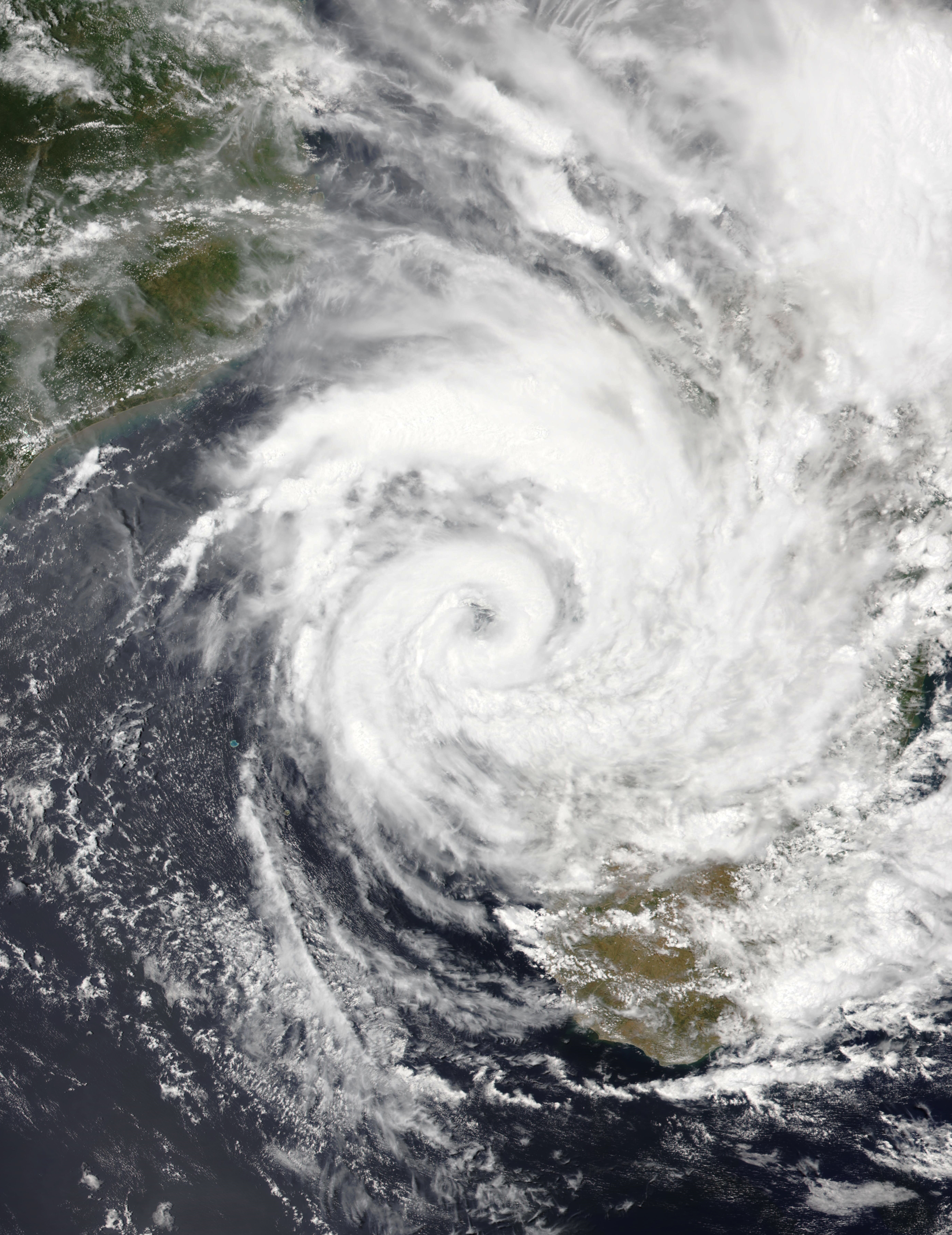
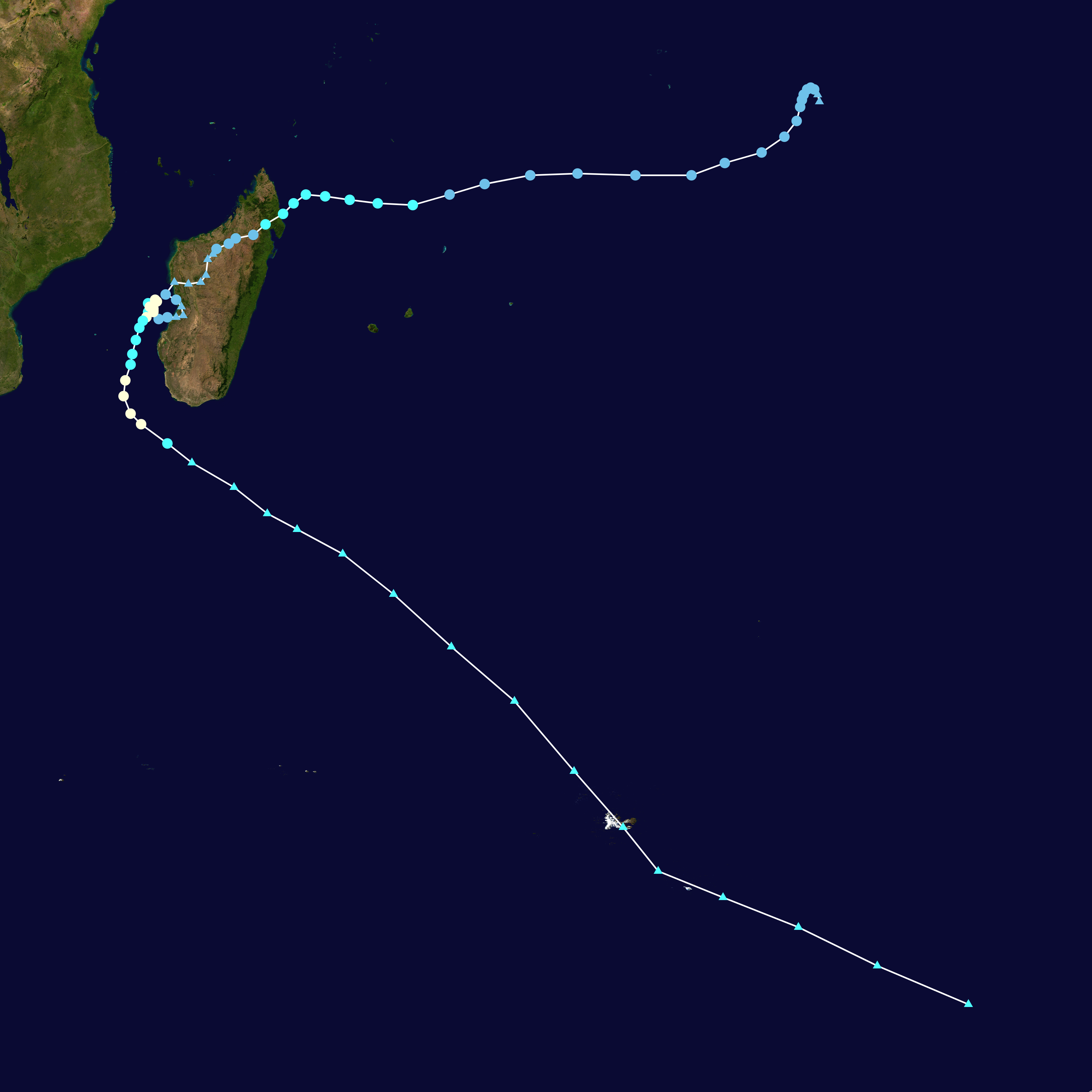
- Duration: 16 January – 29 January
- Peak intensity: 140 km/h (85 mph) (10-min); 964 hPa (mbar)

Cheneso formed on 16 January to the south of Diego Garcia. The system meandered southwestward, becoming a tropical disturbance on 18 January. By late the next day, the system had intensified into Moderate Tropical Storm Cheneso, and the JTWC classified it as Tropical Cyclone 08S. Satellite imagery showed that a central dense overcast (CDO) was obscuring the low-level circulation center (LLCC), and Cheneso intensified further into a severe tropical storm. The cyclone moved ashore in northern Madagascar on 17 January and quickly weakened as it crossed the country. It emerged into the Mozambique Channel as a weak tropical disturbance. Cheneso again reached open waters, and briefly re-intensified into a tropical cyclone. By 06:00 UTC on 29 January, Cheneso structure became poorly organized, prompting MFR to reclassify the storm as a post-tropical depression. The JTWC discontinued warnings on the system around 03:00 UTC on 30 January.

Authorities issued an alert of heavy rain in the country, posing an imminent risk of flooding and landslides. The National Bureau of Risk and Disaster Management (BNGRC) reported 90,870 affected people, and 34,100 were displaced. Overall, the cyclone was responsible for 33 deaths and 20 others missing. Damage from the storm is estimated to exceed $20 million.

=== Tropical Cyclone Dingani ===
- Tropical cyclone (MFR)
- Category 2 tropical cyclone (SSHWS)
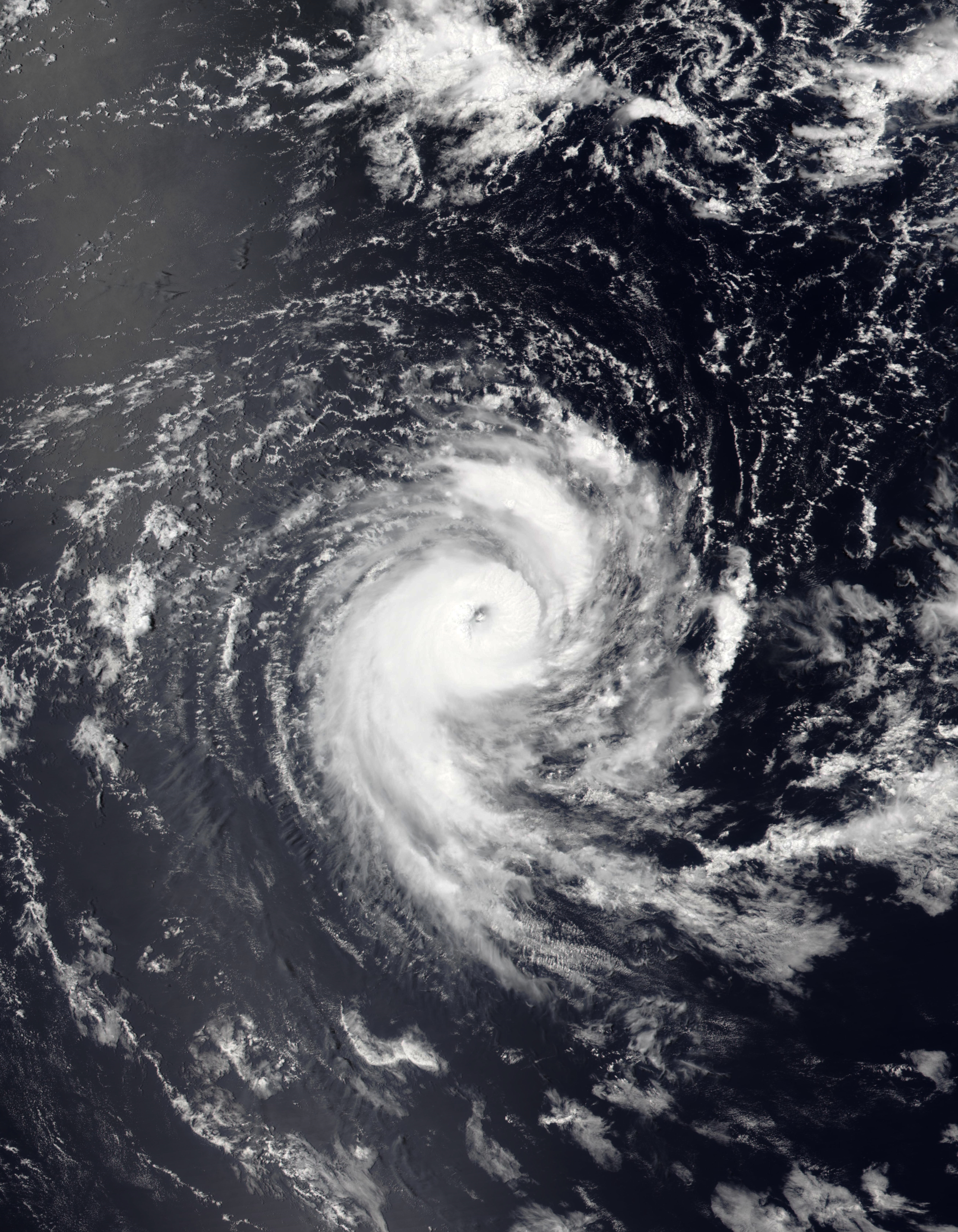
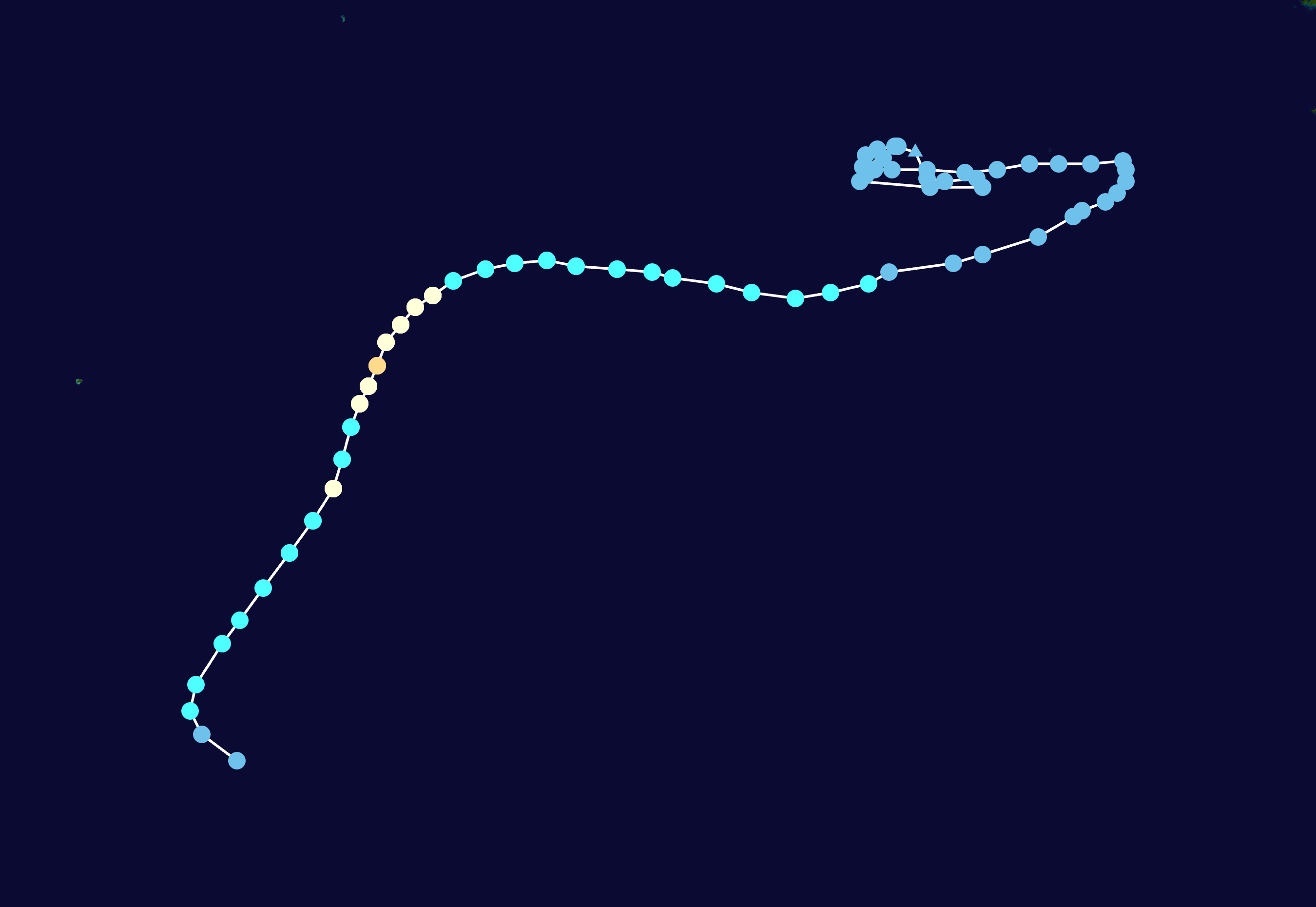
- Duration: 9 February (Entered basin) – 15 February
- Peak intensity: 150 km/h (90 mph) (10-min); 966 hPa (mbar)

On 9 February, Tropical Low 11U from the Australian region entered the basin and was designated as Moderate Tropical Storm Dingani. By 03:00 UTC, the JTWC issued a TCFA, after noting persistent deep convection within its southern quadrant. Later that day, the JTWC initiated advisories on the system and classified it as Tropical Cyclone 13S. The storm had a broad and fully exposed LCC, but was struggling due to northeasterly vertical windshear. By 00:00 UTC on 11 February, as convection maintained near the center, the MFR upgraded the system to a severe tropical storm. Later the next day, Dingani had rapidly consolidated as it formed a 20 km (12 mi) diameter eye, including a significant improved convective structure; the JTWC's assessed the storm to have strengthened into 140 km/h (85 mph) of winds. Dingani continued to intensify and soon became a tropical cyclone. Twelve hours later, the cyclone maintained a well defined-eye. However, shear began impacting the storm, causing the eye to disappear. By 00:00 UTC on 14 February, Dingani weakened back into a severe tropical storm. The JTWC also reported that Dingani's weakened into a tropical storm. Later the next day, Dingani later transitioned into a post-tropical depression. The system was poorly organized, with a high wind shear environment, and the JTWC issued a final warning on the system on 16 February.

=== Very Intense Tropical Cyclone Freddy ===
- Very intense tropical cyclone (MFR)
- Category 5 tropical cyclone (SSHWS)
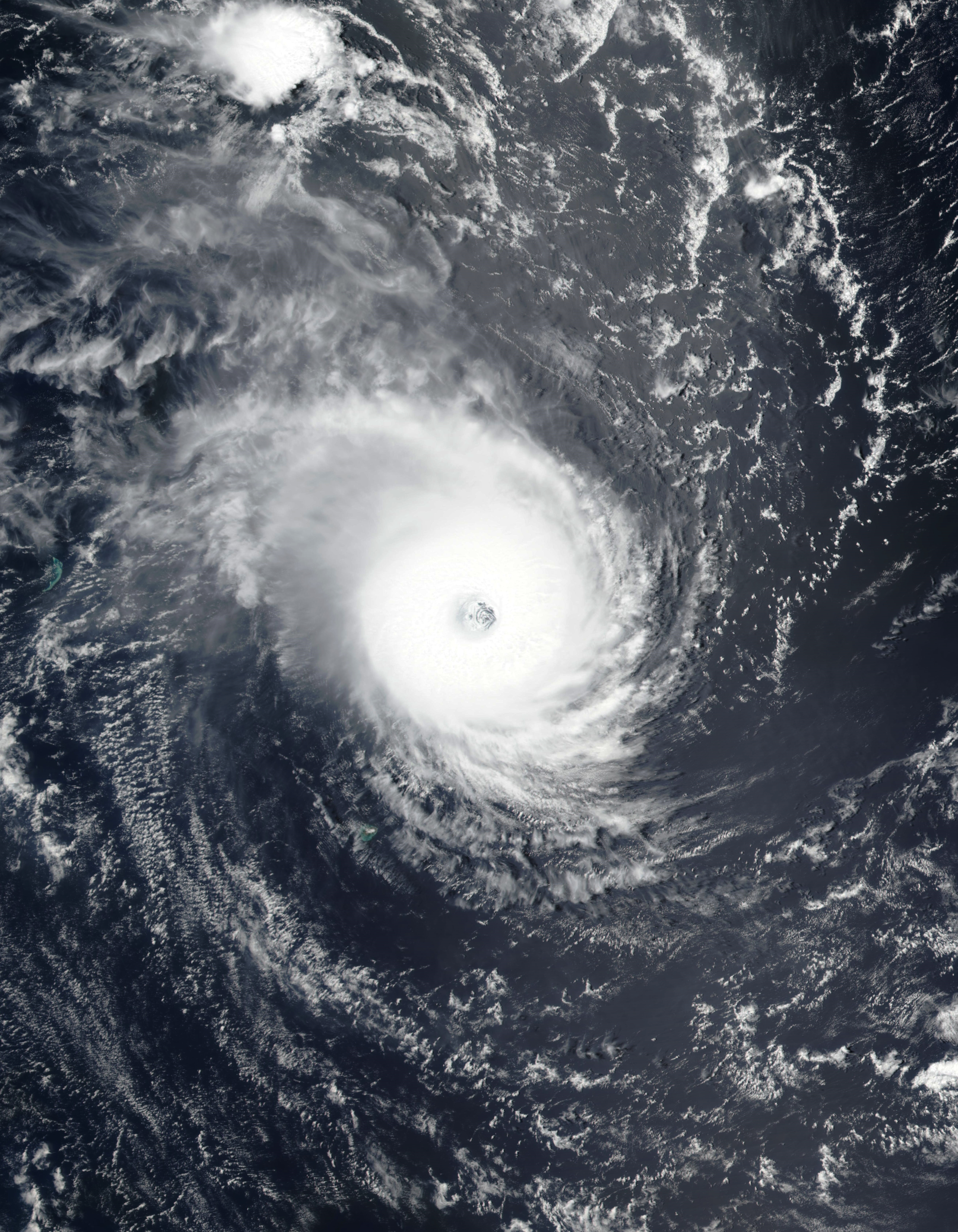
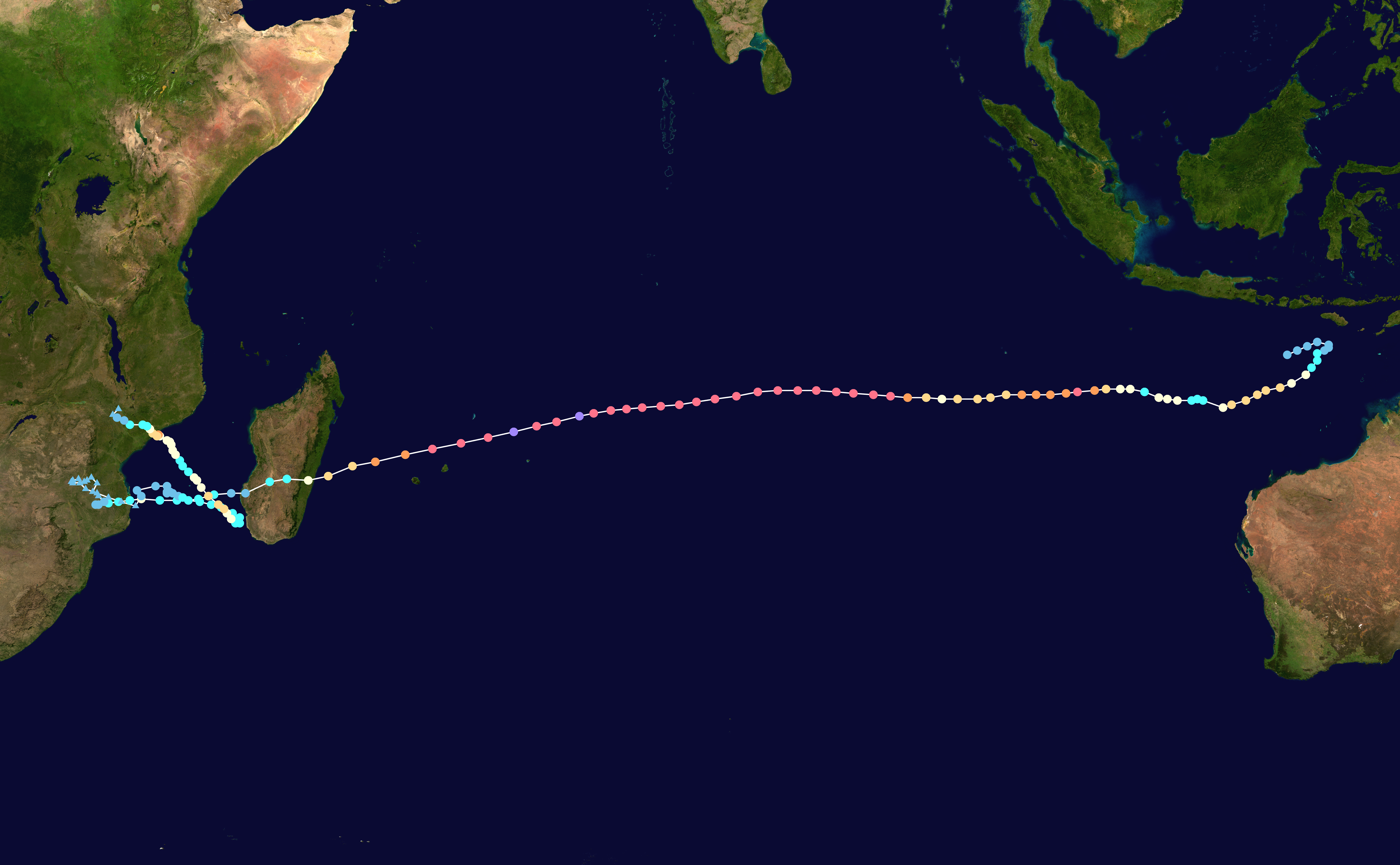
- Duration: 14 February (Entered basin) – 14 March
- Peak intensity: 230 km/h (145 mph) (10-min); 927 hPa (mbar)

On 14 February, Severe Tropical Cyclone Freddy moved into the basin from the Australian region. On 15 February, the system reached Category 5-equivalent intensity, with 1-minute sustained winds of 270 km/h (165 mph). On 19 February, the MFR upgraded Freddy to a very intense tropical cyclone estimated a minimum barometric pressure of 931 hPa (27.49 inHg) and 10-minute sustained winds of 220 km/h (140 mph). However, the MFR later revised these figures, concluding a peak wind speed of 230 km/h (145 mph), and minimum central pressure of 927 hPa (27.37 inHg). Freddy's eye pattern quickly deteriorated as the cloud tops warmed on 20 February, while it was traversing north of the Mascarene Islands. The cyclone developed a pinhole eye while approaching Madagascar as a compact tropical cyclone. Freddy made landfall as a strong Category 2-equivalent intensity with 1-minute sustained winds of 175 km/h (110 mph) near Mananjary, Madagascar on 21 February. It then rapidly weakened upon encountering the mountainous terrain of the island nation and was downgraded to overland depression status. Freddy emerged over the Mozambique Channel on 23 February.

The cyclone moved westward and quickly intensified into a severe tropical storm around 12:00 UTC that day, with convection wrapping around its center. Around 12:00 UTC on 24 February, the storm made landfall in Mozambique south of Vilankulos, with winds about 85 km/h (50 mph), just below severe tropical storm strength. Freddy rapidly weakened as it moved westward and further inland, eventually downgrading to an overland depression around 18:00 UTC that day, before its remnant low continued into Zimbabwe late on 26 February, where it persisted for a couple of days. Freddy entered the channel early on 1 March and continued to intensify, reaching tropical cyclone status as it accelerated eastward towards the coast of Madagascar on 5 March, but then weakened to just below minimal tropical storm strength due to increased wind shear and dry air intrusion. Freddy rapidly intensified once more and made its final landfall near Quelimane, Mozambique, with the JTWC estimated winds of about 175 km/h (110 mph) on 11 March; however, the storm's circulation dissipated shortly thereafter, marking the end of Freddy's time as a tropical cyclone on 14 March. Freddy was the longest-lasting tropical cyclone and the second-farthest traveling tropical cyclone globally in recorded history. Overall, the cyclone killed at least 1,434 people—making it the third deadliest tropical cyclone in the Southern Hemisphere—and inflicted $1.53 billion in damage.

=== Tropical Cyclone Enala ===
- Tropical cyclone (MFR)
- Category 1 tropical cyclone (SSHWS)
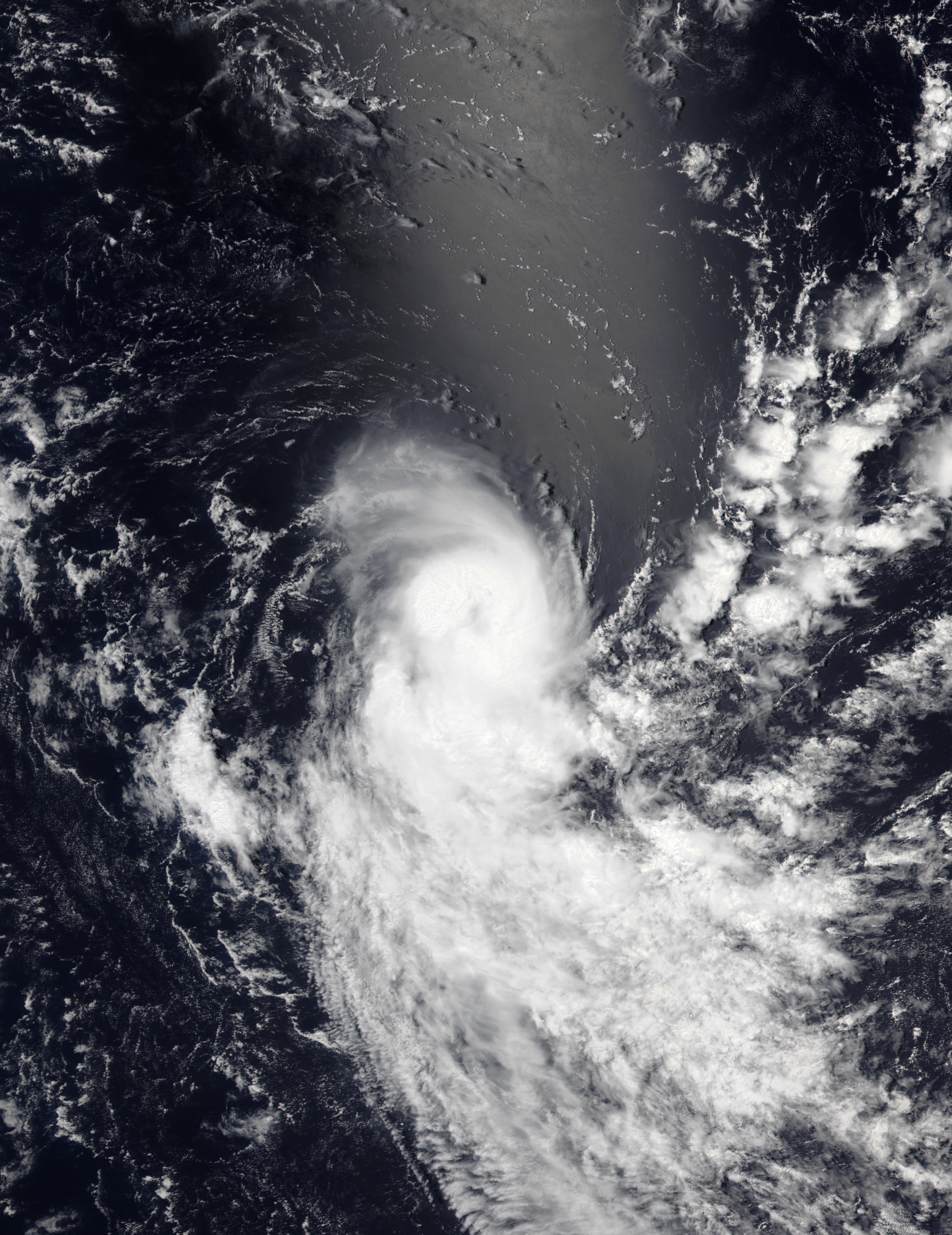
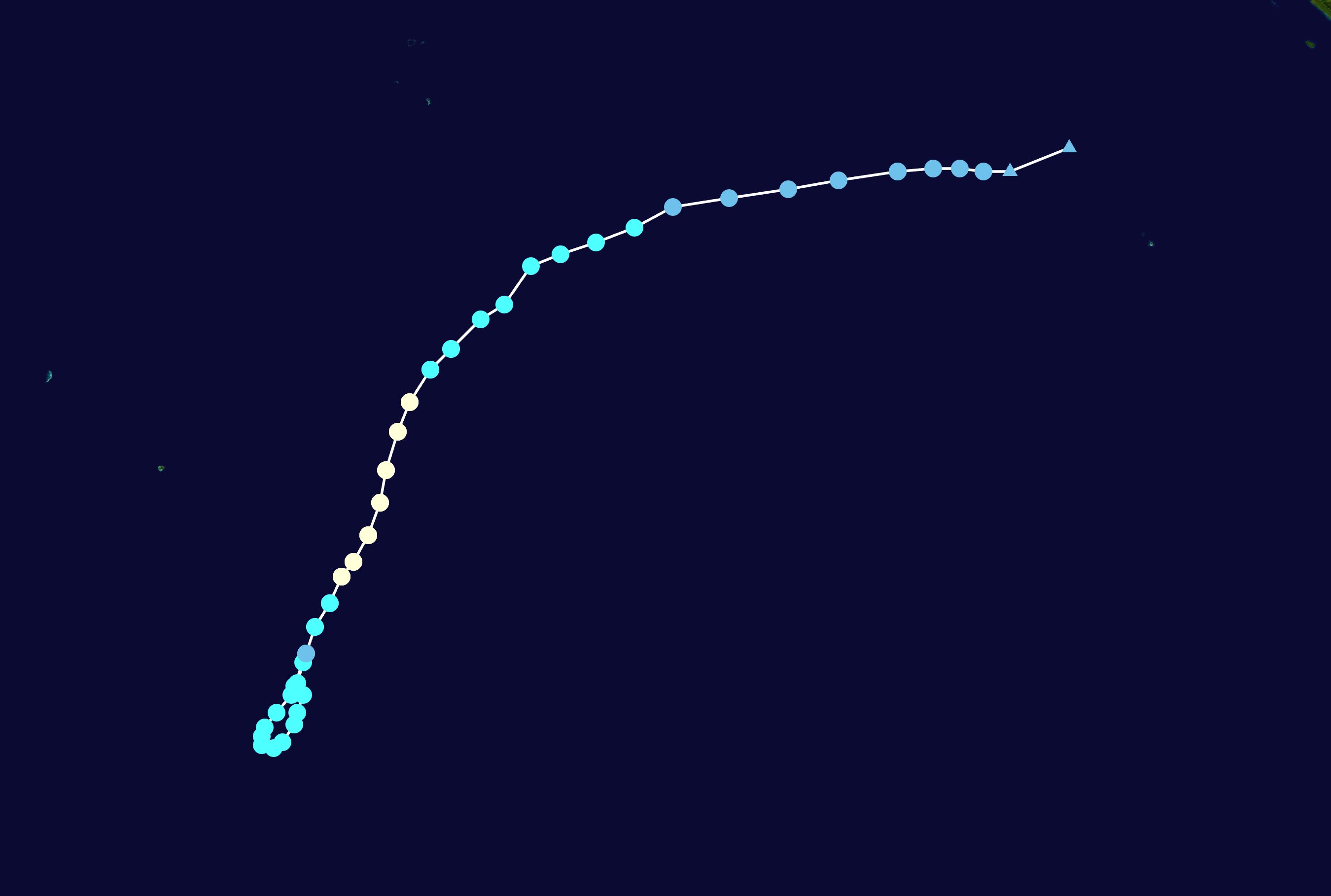
- Duration: 19 February – 28 February
- Peak intensity: 120 km/h (75 mph) (10-min); 975 hPa (mbar)

On 18 February, the MFR began monitoring a clockwise circulation located in the far northeastern corner of the basin, west-northwest of the Cocos Islands. On the following day, it was classified as a zone of disturbed weather by the MFR. Convection had accelerated and was near to the circulation's center. During 22 February, the system began to show signs of organization, and the system gained sufficient organization, noted by curved cloud bands, to be classified as a tropical depression. Later that day, the JTWC issued a TCFA on the system. By 09:00 UTC that day, the JTWC initiated advisories on the system and classified it as Tropical Cyclone 14S. The MFR further upgraded it to a moderate tropical storm with the name Enala from the MMS. Enala's cloud pattern slightly changed in the southwestern semicircle of the system. Enala strengthened into a Category 1-equivalent tropical cyclone on 23 February.

MFR also upgraded the system into a severe tropical storm. The cyclone began to show an eye that was visible on satellite imagery. Enala intensified into tropical cyclone at 00:00 UTC on 24 February. Enala significantly weakened due to strong northwesterly wind shear, prompting the MFR to downgrade the system back to 110 km/h (70 mph). Later that next day, the JTWC also reported that Enala had weakened into a tropical storm. Returning to vertical wind shear with winds of 20–25 km/h (12–16 mph), Enala was downgraded to moderate tropical storm status by the MFR. During 28 February, while continuing to weaken, both the MFR and JTWC ceased issuing advisories due to it initiating subtropical transition.

=== Moderate Tropical Storm 09 ===
- Moderate tropical storm (MFR)
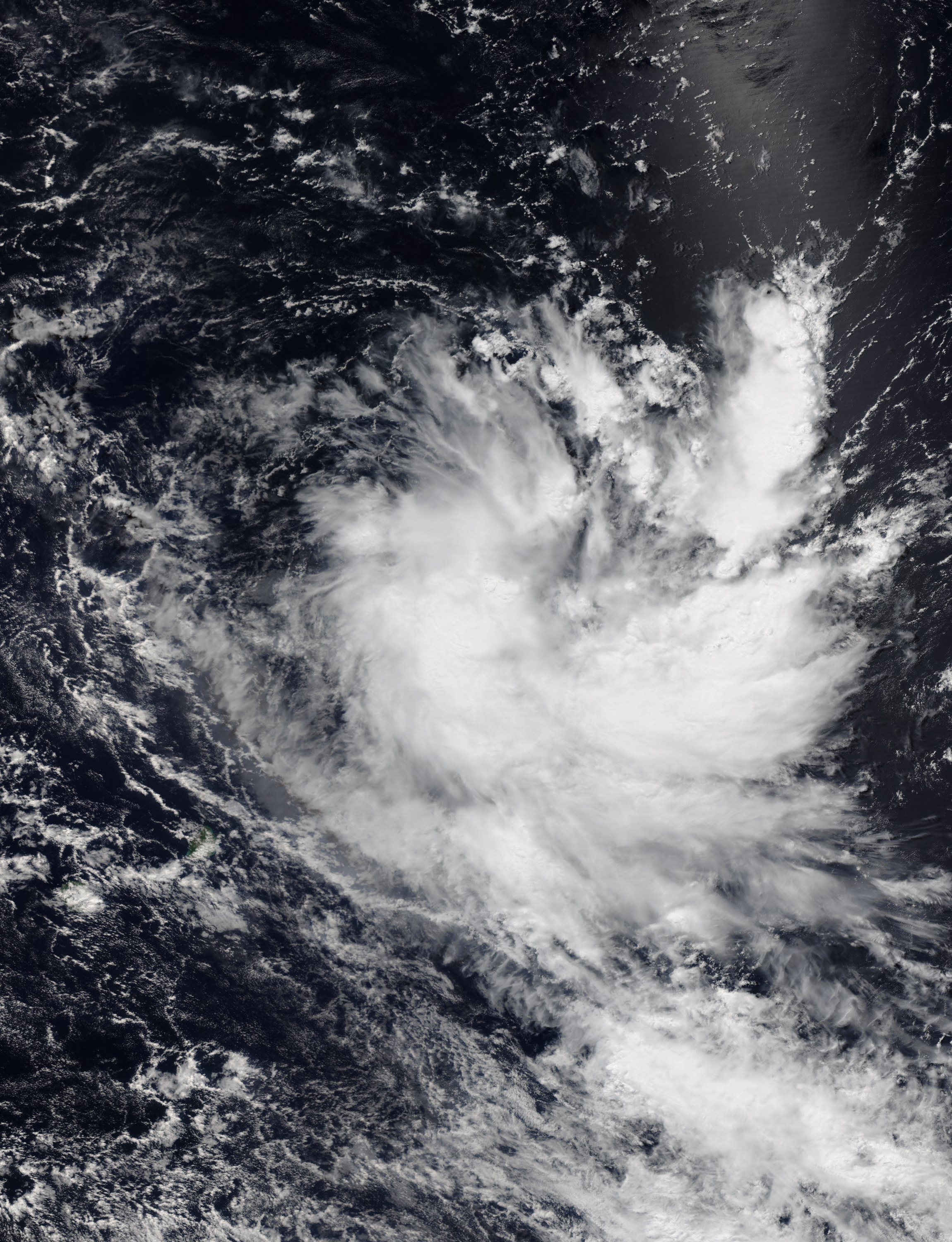
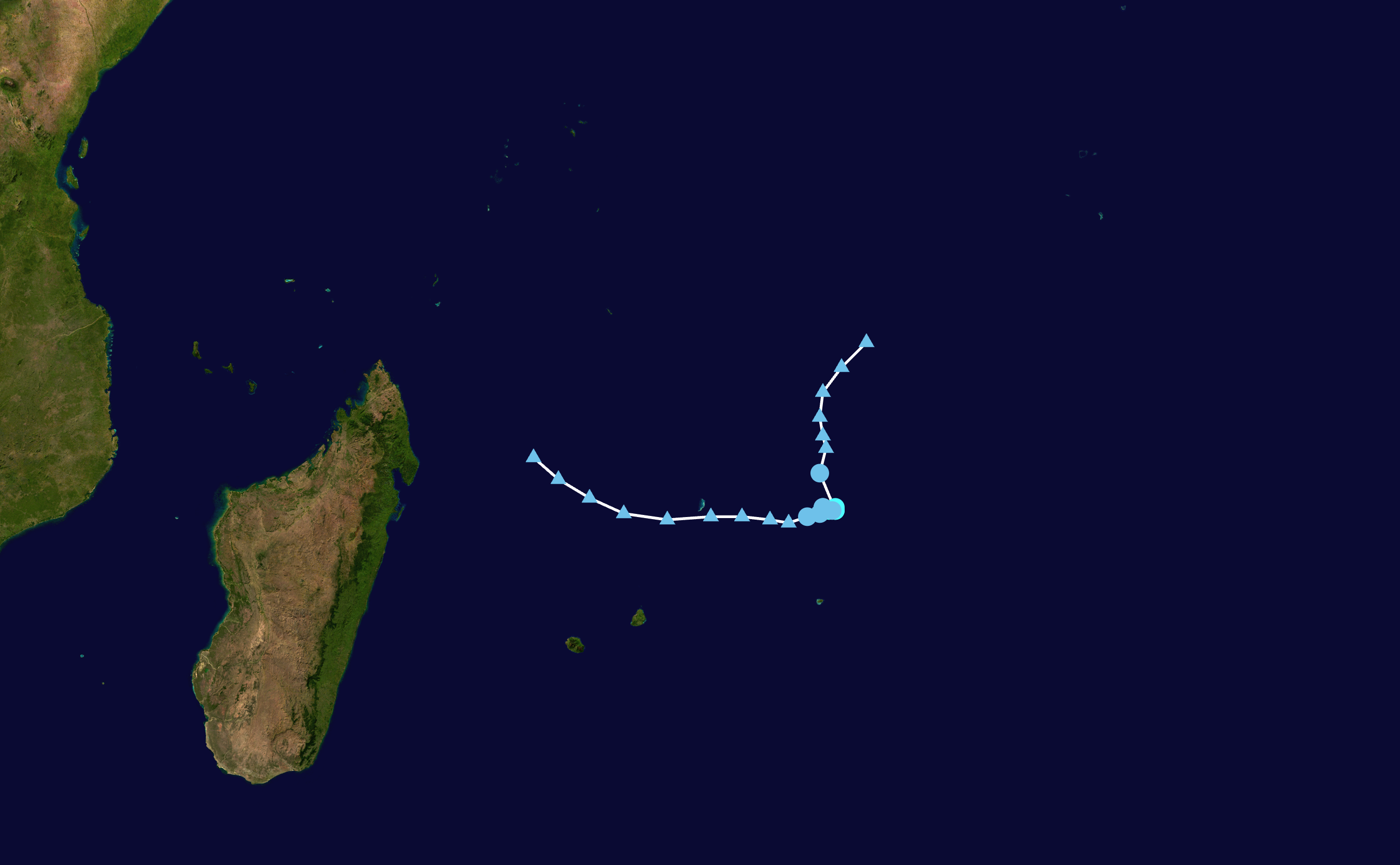
- Duration: 25 March – 28 March
- Peak intensity: 75 km/h (45 mph) (10-min); 997 hPa (mbar)

On 21 March, a weak low-pressure developed over the central Indian Ocean, MFR initially estimated a "very low" chance of a tropical cyclone. During 25 March, organization ensued with deep convection wrapping into its near center in the western and southern quadrants. The system began moving southwards, and on the next day it was classified as a zone of disturbed weather. After meandering for several days, the system began to take a more southerly track, and at 06:00 UTC on 27 March, it was upgraded to a tropical depression. Convective activity associated with the system eventually became limited and the system degenerated into a remnant low by 06:00 UTC on 28 March. During post-storm analysis from the MFR, the system was upgraded into a moderate tropical storm on 26 March, although it remained unnamed.

=== Intense Tropical Cyclone Fabien ===
- Intense tropical cyclone (MFR)
- Category 3 tropical cyclone (SSHWS)
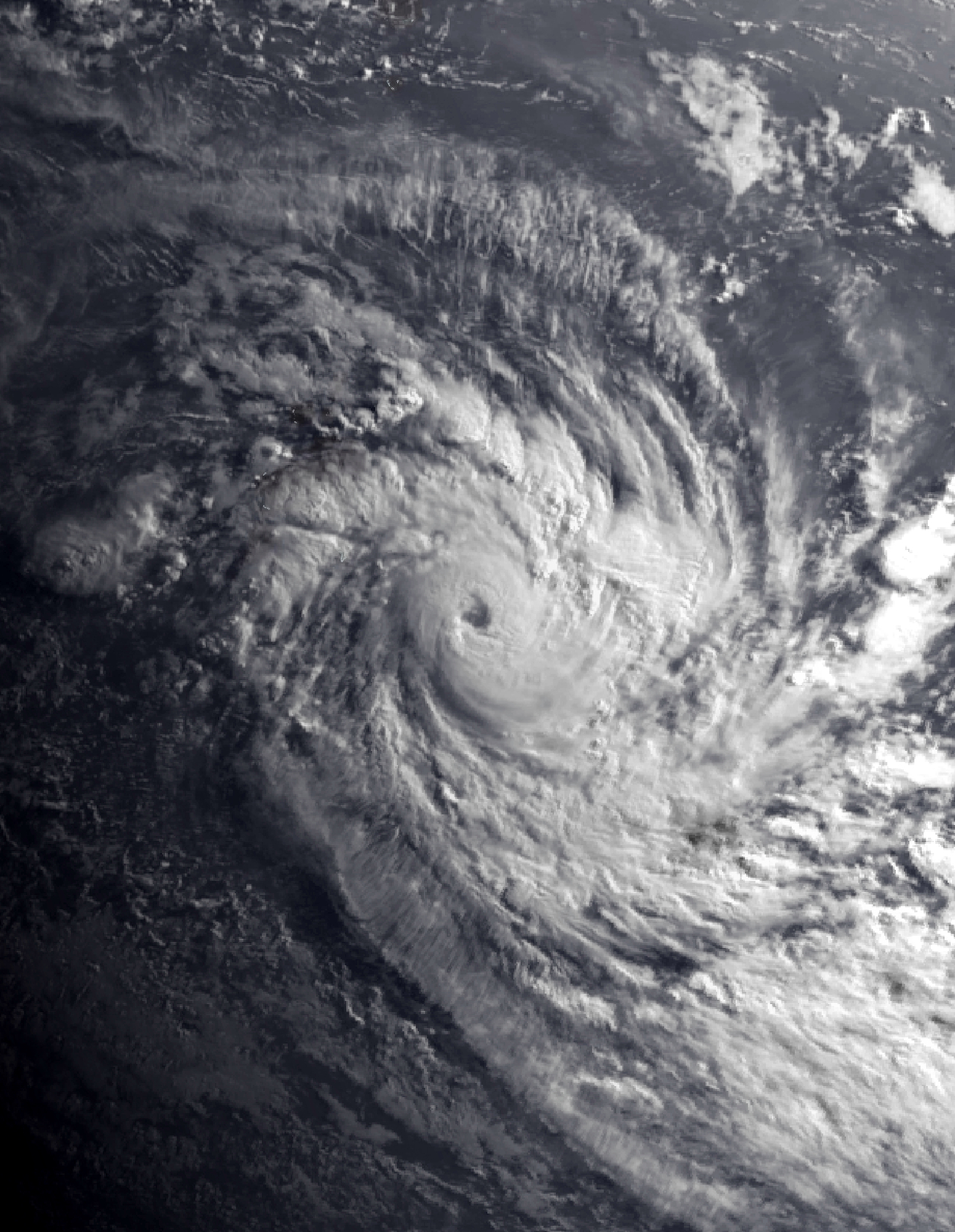
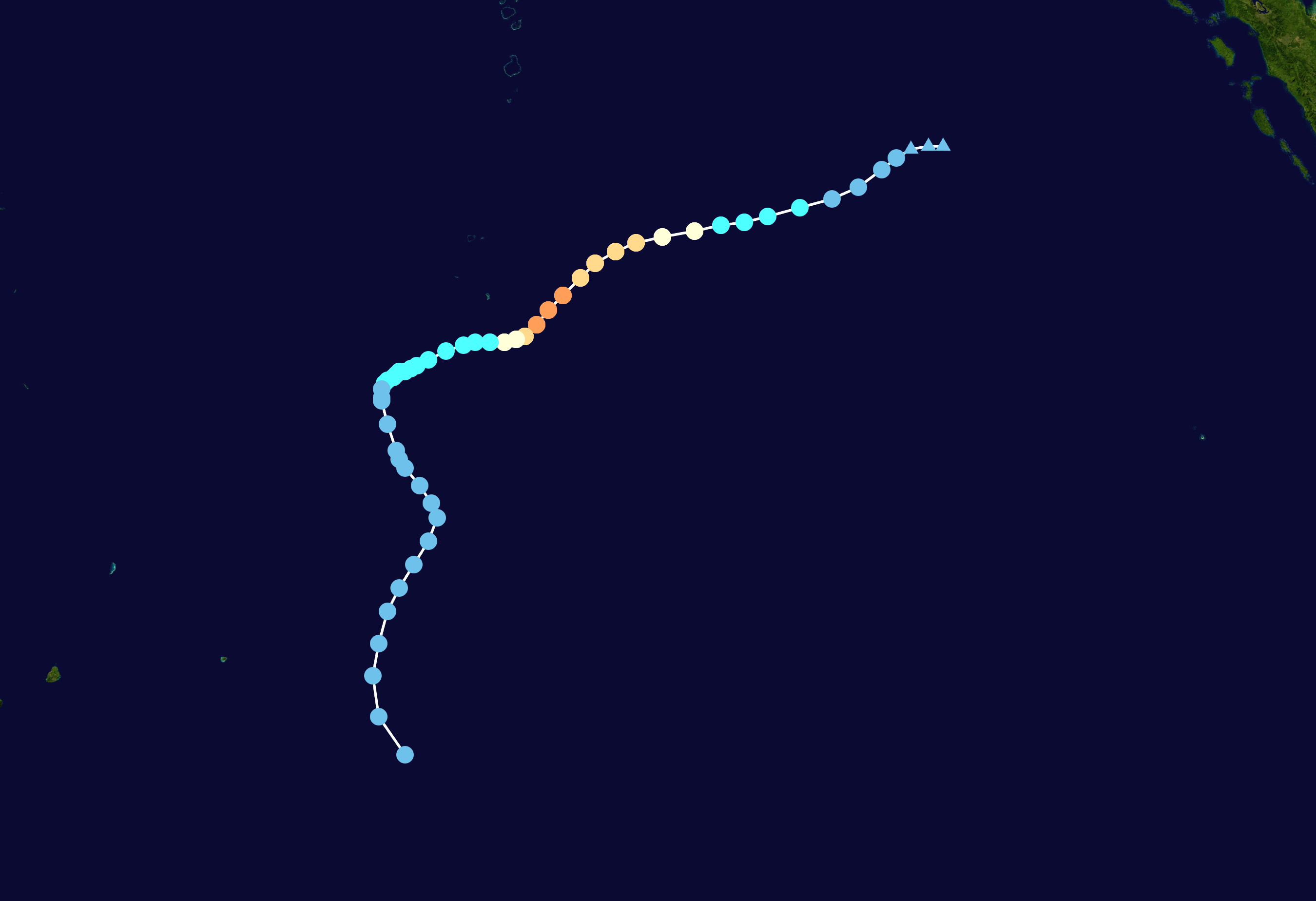
- Duration: 12 May – 25 May
- Peak intensity: 165 km/h (105 mph) (10-min); 959 hPa (mbar)

The active phase of the Madden–Julian oscillation (MJO) led to the MFR forecasting that a cyclonic circulation would form in the Indonesian region to the east of its area of responsibility (AoR). This also aided the development of Cyclone Mocha north of the equator. Long-range ensemble forecast guidance from the Global Forecast System (GFS) and the Integrated Forecast System (IFS) suggested the possibility of a storm forming. A low-pressure developed within the western part, extending across the equator on 8 May. The system began to organize with deep convection obscuring its LLCC. During 13 May, the system had consolidated into a tropical disturbance. Later the same day, the JTWC issued a TCFA on the system. Later the next day, cloud pattern continued to improve with its CDO, and the system organized into a tropical depression. The depression strengthened and became a Moderate Tropical Storm, assigning the name Fabien. The JTWC subsequently classified it as Tropical Cyclone 19S. Operationally, the MFR estimated winds of 75 km/h (45 mph), but reevaluation of ASCAT, the MFR revised the estimated to 95 km/h (60 mph), causing the system to become a severe tropical storm. The storm had an intense band of intense deep convection wrapping over the LLCC, and as a result, Fabien strengthened into a Category 1-equivalent tropical cyclone.

Fabien began showing an eye structure seen in microwave imaging, with Fabien later becoming a tropical cyclone. With a solid eyewall of deep convection surrounding an eye, the JTWC upgraded Fabien to a Category 2-equivalent cyclone at 15:00 UTC on 15 May, estimating that the storm possessed 1-minute sustained winds of 155 km/h (100 mph). Fabien organized into a very symmetric cyclone with an eye about 13 km (8.1 mi) eye in diameter. As a result, the JTWC upgraded Fabien to a Category 3-equivalent tropical cyclone. The MFR later upgraded Fabien into an intense tropical cyclone, becoming the latest cyclone of that intensity in the satellite era, surpassing Cyclone Billy-Lila of 1986 by six days. Moderate wind shear started to affect the west and southwest parts of Fabien, and its eyewall began to erode. Fabien weakened to tropical cyclone strength by 06:00 UTC on 17 May. Convection increased again, and after the storm acquired a warm core, MFR reported that Fabien's winds weakened to 110 km/h (70 mph). Fabien steadily weakened as it began to advect dry air into its circulation, deteriorating into a moderate tropical storm. The MFR and JTWC determined Fabien degenerated into a remnant low, and the last advisory was issued on 21 May. Around 19:00 UTC on 15 May, a Chinese fishing boat, the Lu Pen Yuan Yu, capsized as 7 m (23 ft) waves battered the vessel. At the time of the sinking, 39 people were on the boat: 17 Chinese nationals, 17 Indonesian nationals, and 5 Filipino nationals. So far, 16 dead bodies have been recovered.

== Storm names ==
Within the South-West Indian Ocean, tropical depressions and subtropical depressions that are judged to have 10-minute sustained windspeeds of 65 km/h (40 mph) by the Regional Specialized Meteorological Center on Réunion island, France (RSMC La Réunion) are usually assigned a name. However, it is the Sub-Regional Tropical Cyclone Advisory Centers in Mauritius and Madagascar who name the systems. The Sub-Regional Tropical Cyclone Advisory Center (Mauritius Meteorological Services) in Mauritius names a storm if it intensifies into a moderate tropical storm between 55°E and 90°E. If instead a cyclone intensifies into a moderate tropical storm between 30°E and 55°E then the Sub-Regional Tropical Cyclone Advisory Center (Meteo Madagascar) in Madagascar assigns the appropriate name to the storm. Storm names are taken from three pre-determined lists of names, which rotate on a triennial basis, with any names that have been used automatically removed. Therefore, all storm names used this year will be removed from the rotation and replaced with a new name for the 2025–26 season, while the unused names will remain on the list. New names this season are: Ashley, Balita, Cheneso, Dingani, Enala, Fabien, Gezani, Horacio, Indusa and Juluka. They replaced Ambali, Belna, Calvinia, Diane, Esami, Francisco, Gabekile, Herold, Irondro and Jeruto during the 2019–20 season. The name Enala was misspelled by Météo-France (MFR).

- Ashley
- Balita
- Cheneso
- Dingani
- Enala
- Fabien
- Gezani (unused)
- Horacio (unused)
- Indusa (unused)
- Juluka (unused)
- Kundai (unused)
- Lisebo (unused)
- Michel (unused)
- Nousra (unused)
- Olivier (unused)
- Pokera (unused)
- Quincy (unused)
- Rebaone (unused)
- Salama (unused)
- Tristan (unused)
- Ursula (unused)
- Violet (unused)
- Wilson (unused)
- Xila (unused)
- Yekela (unused)
- Zaina (unused)

If a tropical cyclone enters the South-West Indian basin from the Australian region basin (west of 90°E), it will retain the name assigned to it by the Australian Bureau of Meteorology (BoM). The following storms were named in this manner.

- Darian
- Freddy

After the season, the six names used were automatically retired and replaced with Awo, Blossom, Chenge, Dudzai, Ewetse, and Fytia, respectively for the 2025–26 season. As a result of the major loss of life and damage in Malawi and surrounding countries, the name Freddy was removed from the rotating lists of Australian region cyclone names and will not be used to name a storm in that basin again. On 5 August 2025, during the 23rd session of the RA V Tropical Cyclone Committee, the name Frederic was chosen as a replacement.

== Season effects ==
This table lists all of the tropical cyclones and subtropical cyclones that were monitored during the 2022–2023 South-West Indian Ocean cyclone season. Information on their intensity, duration, name, areas affected, primarily comes from RSMC La Réunion. Death and damage reports come from either press reports or the relevant national disaster management agency while the damage totals are given in 2022 or 2023 USD.

| Name | Dates | Peak intensity | | | Areas affected | Damage (USD) | Deaths | Ref(s). |
| Name | Dates | Category | Wind speed | Pressure | Areas affected | Damage (USD) | Deaths | Ref(s). |
|---|---|---|---|---|---|---|---|---|
| Ashley | 23 – 28 September | Moderate tropical storm | 75 km/h (45 mph) | 1000 hPa (29.53 inHg) | None | None | None | |
| Balita | 3 – 9 October | Moderate tropical storm | 65 km/h (40 mph) | 996 hPa (29.41 inHg) | None | None | None | |
| 03 | 5 – 6 November | Tropical depression | 55 km/h (35 mph) | 1008 hPa (29.77 inHg) | None | None | None | |
| Darian | 21 – 30 December | Very intense tropical cyclone | 220 km/h (140 mph) | 921 hPa (27.20 inHg) | None | None | None | |
| Cheneso | 16 – 29 January | Tropical cyclone | 140 km/h (85 mph) | 965 hPa (28.50 inHg) | Madagascar | $20 million | 33 | |
| Dingani | 9 – 15 February | Tropical cyclone | 140 km/h (85 mph) | 971 hPa (28.67 inHg) | None | None | None | |
| Freddy | 14 February – 14 March | Very intense tropical cyclone | 230 km/h (145 mph) | 927 hPa (27.37 inHg) | Mascarene Islands, Madagascar, Mozambique, Zimbabwe, Malawi | $1.53 billion | 1,434 | |
| Enala | 19 – 28 February | Tropical cyclone | 120 km/h (75 mph) | 980 hPa (28.94 inHg) | None | None | None | |
| 09 | 25 – 28 March | Moderate tropical storm | 75 km/h (45 mph) | 997 hPa (29.44 inHg) | None | None | None | |
| Fabien | 12 – 25 May | Intense tropical cyclone | 175 km/h (110 mph) | 958 hPa (28.29 inHg) | Diego Garcia | None | 16 | |
Season aggregates
| 10 systems | 23 September 2022 – 25 May 2023 | | 230 km/h (145 mph) | 921 hPa (27.20 inHg) | | $1.55 billion | >1,483 | |

== See also ==
- Weather of 2022 and 2023
- List of Southern Hemisphere cyclone seasons
- Tropical cyclones in 2022 and 2023
- Atlantic hurricane seasons: 2022, 2023
- Pacific hurricane seasons: 2022, 2023
- Pacific typhoon seasons: 2022, 2023
- North Indian Ocean cyclone seasons: 2022, 2023
- 2022–23 Australian region cyclone season
- 2022–23 South Pacific cyclone season
