= Saba Saba Day =

Public holiday in Tanzania and protest day in Kenya

- Official name: Maonyesho ya Biashara
- Date: 7 July
- Next time: 7 July 2027
- Frequency: Every year
- Related to: Nane Nane Day

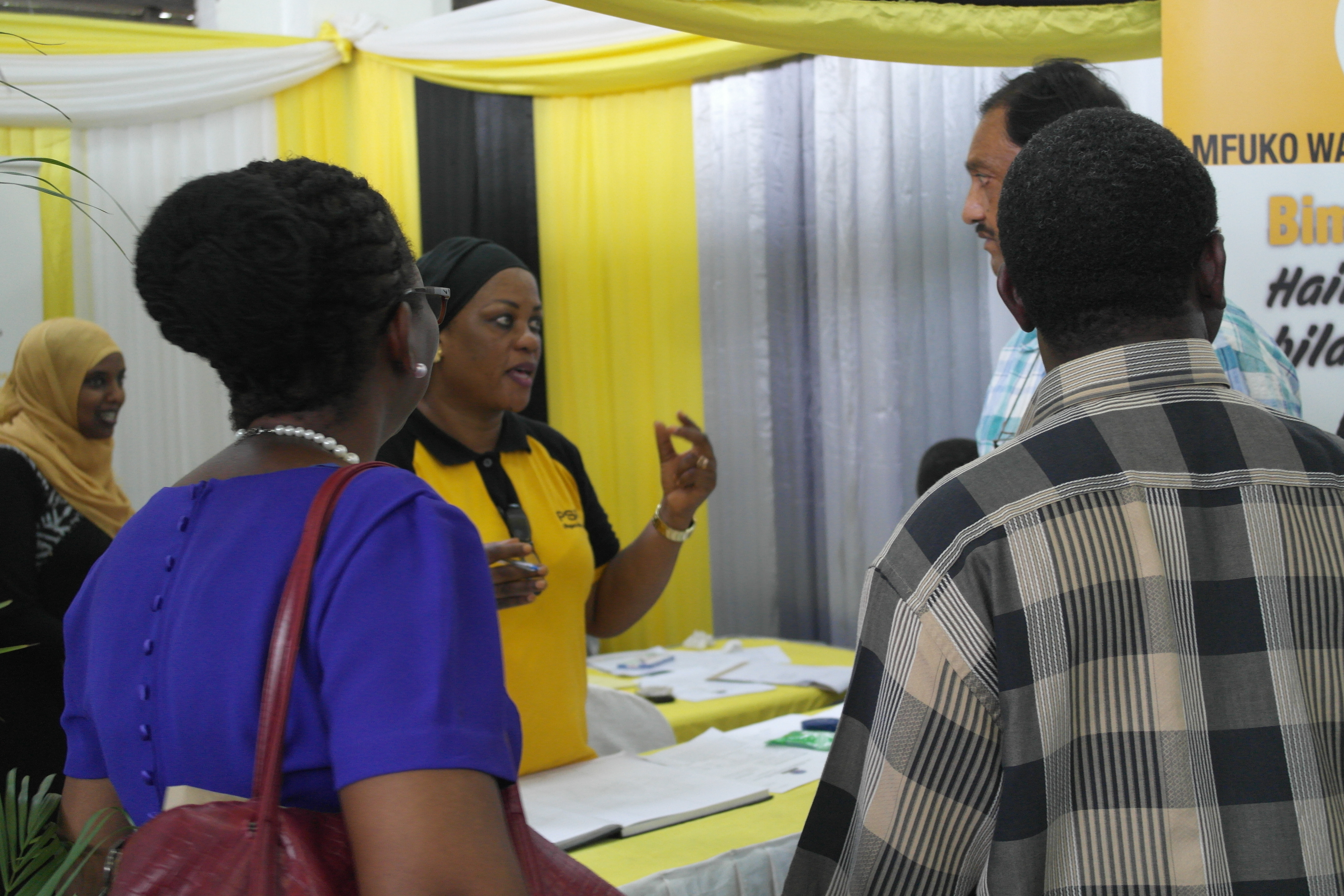

Saba Saba Day on 7 July celebrates various historic holidays in East Africa, particularly in Tanzania and Kenya. The name Saba Saba is symbolic and is Swahili for seven seven, which translates to the 7th day of the 7th month of the year.

In Tanzania, Saba Saba Day commemorates the Dar es Salaam International Trade Fair held annually on this date in the Saba Saba grounds near Kurasini in Dar es Salaam, Tanzania.

Also known as 'Dar es Salaam International Trade Fair Day', this day is a national public holiday in Tanzania that commemorates the 1954 date when the Tanganyika African National Union (TANU) was founded. This is an important date in Tanzania's fight for independence from the British.

== Kenya ==
=== 1990 protests ===
In Kenya, Saba Saba Day is remembered as the day on which nation-wide protests took place at Kamukunji grounds in Nairobi. On 7 July 1990, Kenyans took to the streets to demand free elections. The politicians who had called for the protests, Kenneth Matiba and Charles Rubia, were arrested on 2nd July, days before the protest day. Other organisers of the day such as James Orengo, Njeru Gathangu, John Khaminwa, Gitobu Imanyara, George Anyona and Raila Odinga were beaten up and detained by the then president Daniel arap Moi.

=== Annual protests ===
Every year on 7 July, commemorative demonstrations occur in honour of the 1990 protests.

In present day Kenya, Saba Saba has taken on a new meaning, with opposition leaders, human rights defenders (HRDs) and civil society organisations such as Inuka Kenya Ni Sisi, Kenya Human Rights Commission, National Coalition for Human Rights Defenders, the Social Justice Centres' Working Group and Mathare Social Justice Center among others asking for respect of the constitution, an end to police brutality and killings, advocating for a favourable legal and policy environment in Kenya.

On the 30th anniversary of the Saba Saba in 2020, the Kenyan police teargassed and arrested activists who had taken to the streets to demand for basic rights, as well as clean water, good housing and an end to abuse from those who are in power.

On 7 July 2025 which marked the 35th anniversary, the day was marked with demonstrations across the country, continuing the 2025 Kenyan protests. Human rights groups and protestors, primarily from Generation Z, took to the streets to demand good governance, respect to democracy and an end to police brutality and extrajudicial killings. The Kenya Police killed at least six people during the demonstrations, some of whom were not participating in them. The youngest victim was a 12-year-old girl, Bridgit Njoki, that was watching television at home. She was allegedly killed by a stray police bullet.

On 7 July 2026, 10 people were arrested for participating in the commemorative protests without notice to the Kenya Police. Of the arrested were six activits: Dickson Muli, James Bota, Dennis Kimani, Mulinge Muteti, Michael Ngige and Julius Kamau. They were charged on 8 July at the Milimani Law Court with obstruction of traffic. All six denied the charges. They were released on a bond of Ksh10,000 with an alternative cash bail of Ksh 2,000.
