= Nane Nane Day =

Public holiday in Tanzania

- Official name: Sikukuu ya Wakulima
- Date: 8 August
- Next time: 8 August 2026
- Frequency: annual
- Related to: Saba Saba Day

Nane Nane Day on 8 August celebrates to recognize the important contribution of farmers to the national Tanzanian economy. Nane Nane means "eight eight" in Swahili, the national language of Tanzania (and of Tanganyika and Zanzibar, the two countries whose union created the United Republic of Tanzania in 1964).

Nane Nane also may refer to the Agricultural Exhibition, a one-week fair that takes place every year around this date [8/8] in varying locations of Tanzania. In the Nane Nane Agricultural Exhibition, farmers and other agricultural stakeholders (e.g., universities and research institutes, input suppliers or fertilizer producing industries) showcase new technologies, ideas, discoveries and alternative solutions concerning the agricultural sector. Nane Nane is a fair where government and private firms present their services and activities to the public.

Every year the national Nane Nane show takes place in different locations, for example in Ngongo, Lindi Region (2014), while there are also regional Nane Nane shows held in seven zones, namely in Arusha for Northern Zone; Eastern in Morogoro; Lake in Mwanza and Simiyu; Highlands in Mbeya; Southern in Lindi, Mtwara or Songea; Western in Tabora; and Central in Dodoma.
