= Roman Catholic Diocese of Rutabo =

Coordinates: 1.56667°S 31.61667°E

The Roman Catholic Diocese of Rutabo was a short-lived (1951–1960) bishopric in Tanzania and is now a Latin Catholic titular see.

== History ==
- It was established on 13 December 1951 as Apostolic Vicariate of Lower Kagera, on territory split off from the then Apostolic Vicariate of Bubuka.
- Promoted and renamed after its see city on 25 March 1953 as the Diocese of Rutabo, a suffragan of the Metropolitan Archdiocese of Mwanza (also in Tanzania).
- Suppressed on 21 June 1960, its territory being used to establish the Diocese of Bukoba.

=== Ordinary ===
Apostolic Vicar of Lower Kagera

- Laurean Rugambwa (1951.12.13 – 1953.03.25 see below), Titular Bishop of Febiana (1951.12.13 – 1953.03.25)

Suffragan Bishop of Rutabo

- Laurean Rugambwa (see above 1953.03.25 – see suppressed 1960.06.21); later created Cardinal-Priest of San Francesco a Ripa (1960.03.31 – 1997.12.08), Bishop of Bukoba (Tanzania) (1960.06.21 – 1968.12.19), Metropolitan Archbishop of Dar-es-Salaam (Tanzania) (1968.12.19 – 1992.07.22), President of Association of Member Episcopal Conferences in Eastern Africa (1970 – 1974)

== Titular see ==
It was nominally restored in January 2009 as a Latin titular bishopric.

It has had the following incumbent, of the fitting Episcopal (lowest) rank :

- Telesphore Bilung, Divine Word Missionaries (S.V.D.) (2014.05.06 – ...), Auxiliary Bishop of Ranchi (India) (2014.05.06 – ...)

== Sources and external links ==
- GCatholic, with Google satellite photo
