= Jovitus Francis Mwijage =

Tanzanian Catholic prelate

The Most Reverend Jovitus Francis Mwijage
- Bishop of Bukoba
- Church: Catholic Church
- Archdiocese: Roman Catholic Archdiocese of Tabora
- See: Bukoba
- Appointed: 19 October 2023
- Installed: 27 January 2024
- Predecessor: Desiderius M. Rwoma

Orders
- Ordination: 20 July 1997
- Consecration: 27 January 2024 by Cardinal Protase Rugambwa
- Rank: Bishop

Personal details
- Born: Jovitus Francis Mwijage; 2 December 1966 (age 59) Ishozi Village, Diocese of Bukoba, Kagera Region, Tanzania
- Coat of arms

Styles of Jovitus Francis Mwijage
- Reference style: Your Lordship; The Most Reverend
- Spoken style: His Lordship
- Religious style: Bishop

Jovitus Francis Mwijage (born 2 December 1966) is a Tanzanian Catholic prelate who serves as Bishop of the Roman Catholic Diocese of Bukoba. He was appointed Bishop of Bukoba on 19 October 2023, by Pope Francis.

== Background and education ==
He was born on 2 December 1966, at Ishozi Village, Missenyi District, Diocese of Bukoba, Kagera Region, Tanzania. He attended elementary school in his home area. He attended Ntungamo Major Seminary in Bukoba, where he studied philosophy. He then transferred to the Segerea Senior Seminary in Dar-es-Salaam, where he studied Theology. He graduated with a Doctorate degree from the Pontifical Gregorian University in Rome in 2011, having studied there since 2005.

== Priest ==
He was ordained a priest on 20 July 1997. He served as a priest of Bukoba diocese until 19 October 2023.

As priest of the diocese of Bukoba, he served in several roles inside and outside the diocese, including as:

- Deputy parish priest of Mwemage Parish from 1997 until 1998)
- Instructor of history, Kiswahili, Latin and geography at Rubya Seminary from 1999 until 2005
- Professor of ecclesiastical history at Segerea Senior Seminary from 2011 until 2012
- National director of the Pontifical Mission Societies (PMS) from 2012 until 2023
- National executive director of UMAWATA (Kishaili: Umoja Wa Mapadri Tanzania) (English: Association of Catholic Priests In Tanzania)
- Member of the Regional Council of Seminaries of Kipalapala, Kibosho, Ntungamo, Segerea
- Member of the International Economic Committee of the Pontifical Mission Societies, since 2020.

== As bishop ==
Monsignor Jovitus Francis Mwijage was appointed Bishop of the Roman Catholic Diocese of Bukoba on 19 October 2023. On 27 January 2024, he received episcopal consecration at the Kaitaba Stadium, in Bukoba, Diocese of Bukoba, Tanzania. The Principal Consecrator was Cardinal Protase Rugambwa, Archbishop of Tabora assisted by Bishop Method Paul Kilaini, Auxiliary Bishop Emeritus of Bukoba & Titular Bishop of Tamalluma and by Bishop Almachius Vincent Rweyongeza, Bishop of Kayanga, Tanzania. Bishop Jovitus Francis Mwijage replaced Bishop Desiderius M. Rwoma, whose age-related retirement took effect on 1 October 2022.

== See also ==
- Catholic Church in Tanzania

== Succession table ==
Catholic Church titles
Preceded by Desiderius M. Rwoma (15 January 2013 - 1 October 2022)	Bishop of Bukoba (Since 19 October 2023)	Succeeded by Incumbent
