= Patrick Iteka =

Tanzanian Roman Catholic prelate(1938-1993

The Most Reverend Patrick Iteka
- Bishop of Mahenge, Tanzania (Deceased)
- Church: Catholic Church
- Archdiocese: Roman Catholic Archdiocese of Dar es Salaam
- See: Mahenge
- Appointed: 14 June 1973
- Installed: 5 September 1973
- Term ended: 22 August 1993
- Predecessor: Nikasius Kipengele
- Successor: Agapiti Ndorobo

Orders
- Ordination: 14 August 1965
- Consecration: 5 september 1973 by Laurean Cardinal Rugambwa
- Rank: Bishop

Personal details
- Born: Patrick Iteka; May 23, 1938 Uponera, Ulanga District, Morogoro Region, Tanzania
- Died: 22 August 1993 (aged 55)

Styles of Patrick Iteka
- Reference style: Your Lordship; The Most Reverend
- Spoken style: His Lordship
- Religious style: Bishop

Patrick Iteka (23 May 1938 – 22 August 1993) was a Tanzanian Roman Catholic prelate who served as the Bishop of the Roman Catholic Diocese of Mahenge in Tanzania from 1973 until his death in 1993. He was appointed bishop on 14 June 1973 at the age of 35 years. He died on 22 August 1993 at the age of 55 years.

== Early life and priesthood ==
He was born on 23 May 1938 at Uponera Village, Ulanga District in Morogoro Region in Tanzania. He studied philosophy and Theology and was then ordained a priest of the diocese of Mahenge, Tanzania on 14 August 1965. He served in that capacity until 14 June 1973.

== Bishop ==
On 14 June 1973 Pope Paul VI appointed him Bishop of the Roman Catholic Diocese of Mahenge in the Ecclasiastical Province of Dar es Salam. He was 35 years at the time.

He was consecrated and installed at the Christ the King Kwiro Cathedral in Mahenge on 5 September 1973 by the hands of Laurean Cardinal Rugambwa, Archbishop of Dar es Salaam assisted by Bishop James Dominic Sangu, Bishop of Mbeya and Bishop Adriani Mkoba, Bishop of Morogoro. He succeeded Bishop Nikasius Kipengele, who died in office on 7 December 1971.

Bishop Patrick Iteka is reported to have ordinated Salutaris Melchior Libena a priest of the diocese of Mahenge on 29 June 1991. Father Salutaris Libena was later appointed Bishop of the Roman Catholic Diocese of Ifakara, Tanzania.

Bishop Patrick Iteka died on 22 August 1993 at the age of 55 years, after 30 years as bishop of Mahenge. He is reported to be the longest-serving ordinary of the diocese of Mahenge to date. He was succeeded by Bishop Agapiti Ndorobo at Mahenge.

== See also ==
- Catholic Church in Tanzania

== Succession table ==
Catholic Church titles
Preceded by Nikasius Kipengele (25 June 1970 - 7 December 1971)	Bishop of Mahenge (14 June 1973 until 22 August 1993)	Succeeded by Agapiti Ndorobo
