= Renatus Leonard Nkwande =

Tanzanian Roman Catholic prelate (born 1965)

The Most Reverend Renatus Leonard Nkwande
- Archbishop of Mwanza
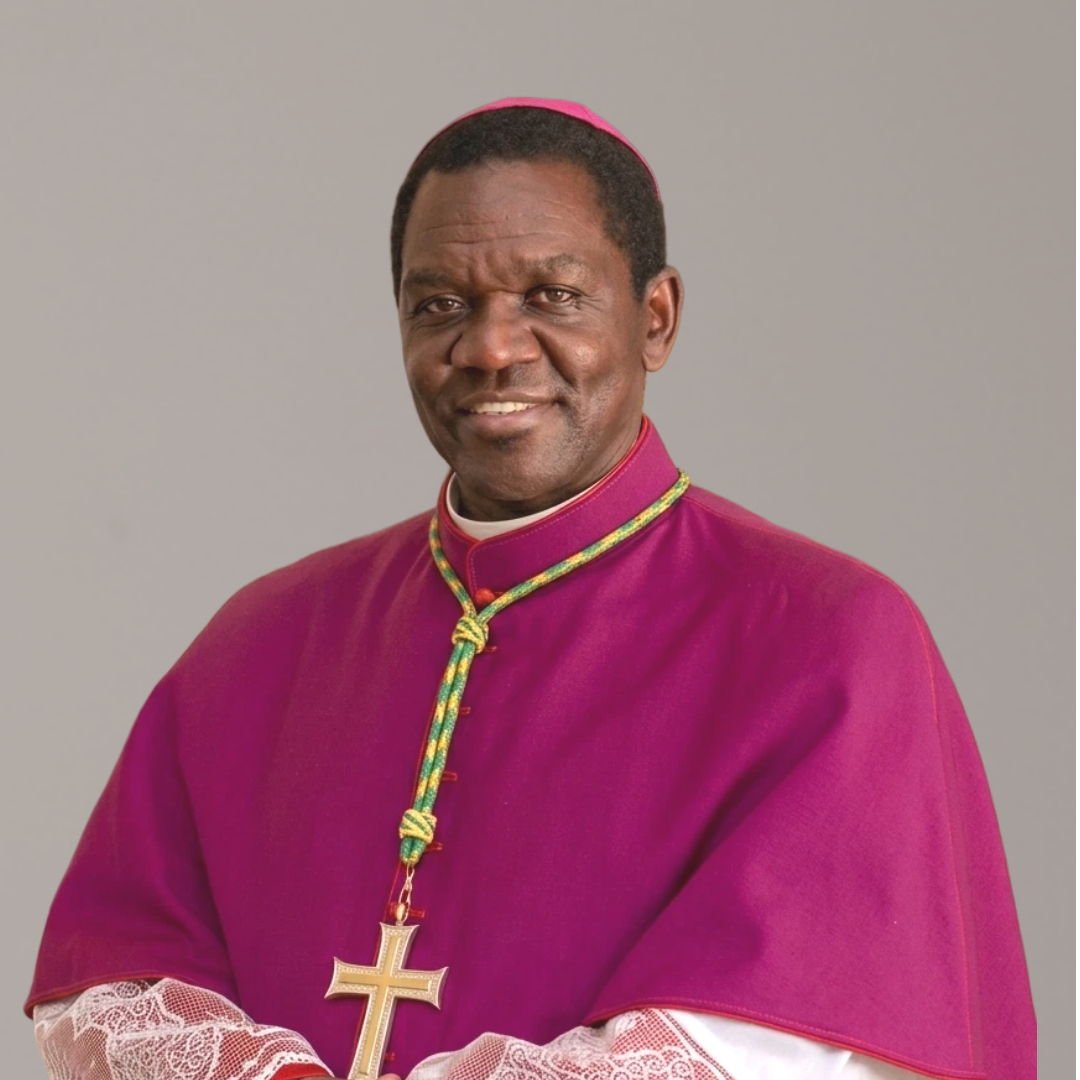
- Archbishop Renatus Nkwande
- Church: Roman Catholic Church
- Archdiocese: Archdiocese of Mwanza
- See: Mwanza
- Appointed: 11 February 2019
- Installed: 12 May 2019
- Predecessor: Jude Thaddaeus Ruwa'ichi
- Previous posts: Bishop of Bunda (2010 - 2019); Apostolic Administrator of Geita (2014 - 2016)

Orders
- Ordination: 2 July 1995
- Consecration: 20 February 2011 by Polycarp Pengo
- Rank: Archbishop

Personal details
- Born: Renatus Leonard Nkwande; 12 November 1965 (age 61) Mantare, Tanzania
- Motto: Bwana ni fungula posho langu (Lord, release my food)

Styles of Renatus Leonard Nkwande
- Reference style: His Grace; The Most Reverend
- Spoken style: Your Grace
- Religious style: Archbishop

Renatus Leonard Nkwande (born 12 November 1965), is a Tanzanian Catholic prelate who is the archbishop of the Roman Catholic Archdiocese of Mwanza in Tanzania, since 11 February 2019. Before that, between 27 November 2010 and 12 May 2019, he was bishop of the Roman Catholic Diocese of Bunda, Tanzania. He was appointed bishop by Pope Benedict XVI. He was consecrated bishop on 20 February 2011 and installed at Bunda. On 11 February 2019, Pope Francis transferred him to Mwanza and elevated him to archbishop over that Ecclesiastical Metropolitan Province. He was installed at Mwanza on 12 May 2019.

== Background and education ==
Nkwande was born in Mantare, Tanzania, on 12 November 1965. He attended primary schools in Sumve, from 1974 until 1980. In 1981 he joined Saint Pius' Junior Seminary, where he completed his O-Level studies. He continued with his A-Level education at Saint Mary's Junior Seminary in Nyegezi, between 1984 and 1986. In 1987 he entered the Kibosho Major Seminary in the Diocese of Moshi, where he studied philosophy between 1987 until 1989. He studied theology at Saint Charles Lwanga Seminary in Dar-es-Salaam. He studied in Rome for a Licentiate in Canon Law at the Pontifical Urban University between 2002 and 2005.

== Priest ==
On 2 July 1995, he was ordained priest for the Roman Catholic Archdiocese of Mwanza. He served as priest until 27 November 2010. While a priest, he served in various roles and locations including as:

- Deputy Assistant Parish Priest in Magu Parish from 1995 until 1996.
- Rector of Saint Mary's Junior Seminary in Nyegezi from 1996 until 2002.
- Parish Priest in Ilemela Parish in 2002.
- Studies in Rome for a Licentiate in Canon Law at the Pontifical Urban University from 2002 until 2005.
- Notary and Managing Director of Self-Reliance Projects from 2005 until 2007.
- Diocesan Treasurer of Mwanza Diocese from 2005 until 2007.
- Vicar General of the Archdiocese of Mwanza from 2008 until 2009.
- Diocesan Administrator of the Mwanza Archdiocese from 2009 until 2010.

== Bishop ==
On 27 November 2010, Pope Benedict XVI created the Roman Catholic Diocese of Bunda, Tanzania by taking territory from the Diocese of Musoma and the Archdiocese of Mwanza. The new diocese is a suffragan of the Archdiocese of Mwanza. The Holy Father appointed Reverend Father Renatus Leonard Nkwande, previously the Diocesan Administrator of the Archdiocese of Mwanza as the pioneer bishop of Bunda. He was consecrated bishop and installed in front of Saint Paul Cathedral, Bunda, Diocese of Bunda on 20 February 2011. The Principal Consecrator was Cardinal Polycarp Pengo, Archbishop of Dar-es-Salaam assisted by Jude Thaddaeus Ruwa'ichi, Archbishop of Mwanza and Michael George Mabuga Msonganzila, Bishop of Musoma.

== Archbishop ==
On 11 February 2019, Pope Francis elevated Bishop Renatus Leonard Nkwande to Archbishop and was appointed to lead the Roman Catholic Archdiocese of Mwanza. He was installed at Mwanza on 12 May 2019. As of 2025, he continues to serve as archbishop at Mwanza.

== See also ==
- Catholic Church in Tanzania

== Succession table ==
Catholic Church titles
Preceded by Jude Thaddaeus Ruwa'ichi (10 November 2010 - 21 June 2018)	Archbishop of Mwanza (since 11 February 2019)	Succeeded by Incumbent
Preceded by None (Diocese created)	Bishop of Bunda (27 November 2010 - 11 February 2019)	Succeeded by Simon Chibuga Masondole (since 6 Apr 2021)
