= Severine Niwemugizi =

Tanzanian Catholic prelate

The Most Reverend Severine Niwemugizi
- Bishop of Rulenge-Ngara
- Church: Catholic Church
- Archdiocese: Roman Catholic Archdiocese of Mwanza
- See: Rulenge-Ngara
- Appointed: 8 November 1996
- Installed: 16 February 1997
- Predecessor: Christopher Mwoleka
- Successor: Incumbent

Orders
- Ordination: 16 December 1984
- Consecration: 16 February 1997 by Anthony Peter Mayalla

Personal details
- Born: Severine Niwemugizi; 3 June 1956 (age 68); Katoke, Diocese of Rulenge, Kagera Region, Tanzania

Severine Niwemugizi (born 3 June 1956) is a Tanzanian Roman Catholic prelate who is the Bishop of the Roman Catholic Diocese of Rulenge-Ngara, Tanzania. He was appointed bishop of Rulenge-Ngara on 8 November 1996 by Pope John Paul II.

== Early life and education ==
He was born in Katoke Village, in Rulenge Diocese, Kagera Region. He attended Tanzanian seminaries, where he qualified to be ordained as a priest in 1984.

== Priest ==
He was ordained priest of Rulenge Diocese on 16 December 1984. He served in that capacity until 8 November 1996.

== Bishop ==
On 8 November 1996 the Holy Father appointed him Bishop of the Roman Catholic Diocese of Rulenge, Tanzania. He was consecrated and installed on 16 February 1997 by the hands of Archbishop Anthony Peter Mayalla, Archbishop of Mwanza assisted by Bishop Paul Runangaza Ruzoka, Bishop of Kigoma and Bishop Aloysius Balina, Bishop of Geita. He celebrated his Silver Jubilee as bishop in February 2022.

Bishop Severine Niwemugizi served as the president of the Tanzania Episcopal Conference (TEC) from 2000 until 2006. From 2012 until 2018, he served as the chairman of the TEC's "Peace and Justice Commission". He is reported to be an outspoken prelate who sometimes gets on the wrong side of politicians and government bureaucrats.

== See also ==
- Catholic Church in Tanzania

== Succession table ==
Catholic Church titles
Preceded by Christopher Mwoleka (26 June 1969 - 8 November 1996)	Bishop of Rulenge-Ngara (since 8 November 1996)	Succeeded by Incumbent
