= Diocese of Bukoba =

The Diocese of Bukoba may refer to two stages of a Latin Catholic Diocese with successive sees in northwestern Tanzania :

- The former Roman Catholic Diocese of Bukoba, until June 21, 1960; established on 1929.04.08 as Apostolic Vicariate of Bubuka, promoted bishopric on 1953.03.25
- (informally) The Roman Catholic Diocese of Rulenge, its successor see, itself renamed Roman Catholic Diocese of Rulenge–Ngara on 2008.08.14
- The Lutheran Diocese of Bukoba
