= John James Rudin =

American Catholic bishop (1916–1995)

The Most Reverend John J. Rudin, M.M.
- Bishop of Musoma
- Church: Catholic Church
- Appointed: July 5, 1957
- In office: October 3, 1957 - January 12, 1979

Orders
- Ordination: June 11, 1944
- Consecration: October 3, 1957 by Joseph Blomjous, M. Afr.

Personal details
- Born: November 27, 1916 Pittsfield, Massachusetts
- Died: June 14, 1995 (aged 78) Tarrytown, New York

John James Rudin, M.M. (November 27, 1916 – June 14, 1995) was an American-born Catholic missionary and bishop. As a member of the Catholic Foreign Mission Society of America (Maryknoll), he was engaged in education in the United States before he was assigned to the missions in Tanzania. He served as the Bishop of Musoma from 1957 to 1979.

== Early life and education ==
John Rudin was born in Pittsfield, Massachusetts, to John J. and Mary A. (Kelley) Rudin. He was educated in the local public schools in Pittsfield. He studied for the priesthood at Maryknoll Apostolic College and was ordained a priest at the Maryknoll Seminary in Ossining, New York, on June 11, 1944.

== Priesthood ==
After his ordination, Rudin earned a Licentiate in Sacred Theology from The Catholic University of America in Washington, D.C. He taught Latin and liturgy for two years at the Maryknoll Apostolic College before being assigned to the Collegio Maryknoll in Rome where he earned a Doctorate in Moral Theology from the Pontifical Gregorian University in 1948. Rudin served as the Rector of the Maryknoll Junior Seminary in Brookline, Massachusetts, for three years before he joined the Maryknoll Seminary Faculty to teach moral theology in 1951. He also served as the seminary's Vice-Rector for three years.

In 1954, Rudin was assigned to lead Maryknoll's new mission field in Tanzania. He was appointed as the Society's Superior for Africa in 1956. On July 5, 1957 Pope Pius XII appointed him as the first bishop of the Diocese of Musoma.

== Episcopacy ==
John Rudin was consecrated a bishop in an open-air liturgy on October 3, 1957, by Bishop Joseph Blomjous, M. Afr. of Mwanza. The principal co-consecrators were Bishop Edward McGurkin, M.M. of Shinyanga and Auxiliary Bishop Maurice Otunga of Kisumu. Rudin attended all four sessions of the Second Vatican Council. During the Council he served on the committee working for greater unity between the Churches of East and West Africa. In 1976, he believed the diocese was firmly established and a missionary bishop was no longer needed. His resignation was not accepted, however, and he continued to serve the diocese, until his resignation was finally accepted by Pope John Paul II on January 12, 1979.

== Later life and death ==
After he returned to the United States, Rudin was engaged in pastoral work from 1980 to 1988, including a stint with the Glenmary Home Missioners in the Diocese of Savannah. He then worked with the Maryknoll Development Department until he suffered a fall in 1993 and began using a wheelchair. He moved to the St. Teresa Residence in Ossining where he remained until his death. He died on June 14, 1995, at Phelps Memorial Hospital in Tarrytown, New York, at the age of 78. His funeral Mass was celebrated in the Queen of Apostles Chapel on June 20, 1995. He was buried in the Maryknoll Center Cemetery.
