= Maurus Gervase Komba =

Tanzanian Roman Catholic bishop

- Bishop of Tanga
- Church: Catholic Church
- Diocese: Diocese of Tanga
- In office: 15 December 1969 – 18 January 1988
- Predecessor: Eugéne Cornelius Arthurs
- Successor: Telesphore Richard Mkude

Orders
- Ordination: 15 July 1954
- Consecration: 15 March 1970 by Laurean Rugambwa

Personal details
- Born: 1923 Litembo, Songea Division, mandatory Tanganyika Territory, British Empire
- Died: 23 February 1996 (aged 72–73)

Maurus Gervase Komba (1923 − 23 February 1996) was a Tanzanian Roman Catholic bishop.

Ordained to the priesthood in 1954, Komba was named bishop of Roman Catholic Diocese of Tanga, Tanzania in 1970 and resigned in 1988.
