= Michael George Mabuga Msonganzila =

Tanzanian Catholic prelate

The Most Reverend Michael George Mabuga Msonganzila
- Bishop of Musoma
- Church: Catholic Church
- Archdiocese: Roman Catholic Archdiocese of Mwanza
- See: Musoma
- Appointed: 10 November 2007
- Installed: 20 January 2008

Orders
- Ordination: 2 December 1984
- Consecration: 20 January 2008 by Anthony Peter Mayalla
- Rank: Bishop

Personal details
- Born: Michael George Mabuga Msonganzila; 17 July 1956 (age 68); Bukumbi, Diocese of Mwanza, Mwanza Region, Tanzania

Styles of Michael George Mabuga Msonganzila
- Reference style: Your Lordship; The Most Reverend
- Spoken style: His Lordship
- Religious style: Bishop

Michael George Mabuga Msonganzila (born 17 July 1956) is a Tanzanian Catholic prelate who serves as the Bishop of the Roman Catholic Diocese of Musoma. He was appointed bishop of Musoma on 10 November 2007 by Pope Benedict XVI.

== Background and education ==
He was born on 7 July 1956, at Bukumbi, Mwanza Region, Diocese of Mwanza, Tanzania. He attended primary and secondary schools in his home area. He attended Nyegezi Minor Seminary for his one year preparatory period.

He studied philosophy at St. Anthony Major Seminary in Ntungamo, in the Diocese of Bukoba. He then studied Theology at St. Paul Major Seminary in Kipalapala, in the archdiocese of Tabora. From 1990 he studied in Rome, Italy, graduating with a Doctorate in Canon Law, from the Pontifical Urban University in 1994.

== Priesthood ==
He was ordained a priest of the diocese of Mwanza on 2 December 1984. He served in that capacity until 10 November 2007.

As priest he served in various roles inside and outside of his diocese including as:

- Assistant priest at Itira Parish from 1985 until 1989
- Lecturer at Nyegezi Minor Seminary from 1985 until 1989
- Assistant priest at Murutunguru Parish from 1989 until 1990
- Director of vocations in Mwanza Diocese from 1995 until 1997
- Vicar General of the Diocese of Mwanza from 1996 until 1999
- Bishop's delegate for religious from 1999 until 2000
- Professor at Peramiho Major Seminary from 2000 until 2003
- Counsellor at Saint Augustine University, since 2005
- Parish priest at Malya Parish and spiritual director for the Benedictine nuns in Mwanza
- National director of the Pontifical Mission Societies in Tanzania since 2007.

== As bishop ==
He was appointed Bishop of the Roman Catholic Diocese of Musoma, Tanzania on 10 November 2007.

He was consecrated and installed at Musoma in the Archdiocese of Mwanza on 20 January 2008, at the hands of Archbishop Anthony Peter Mayalla, Archbishop of Mwanza assisted by Archbishop Paul Runangaza Ruzoka, Archbishop of Tabora and Bishop Nestorius Timanywa, Bishop of Bukoba. While bishop, he celebrated 40 years of priesthood on 29 August 2024.

== See also ==
- Catholic Church in Tanzania

== Succession table ==
Catholic Church titles
Preceded by Justin Tetmu Samba (25 October 1988 - 23 August 2006)	Bishop of Musoma (Since 10 November 2007)	Succeeded by Incumbent
