= Justin Tetmu Samba =

Tanzanian Catholic prelate (1950 - 2006)

The Most Reverend Justin Tetmu Samba
- Bishop of Musoma, Tanzania (Deceased)
- Church: Catholic Church
- Archdiocese: Roman Catholic Archdiocese of Mwanza
- See: Diocese of Musoma
- Appointed: 25 October 1988
- Installed: 6 January 1989
- Term ended: 23 August 2006
- Predecessor: Anthony Peter Mayalla (12 January 1979 - 18 November 1987)
- Successor: Michael George Mabuga Msonganzila (since 10 November 2007)

Orders
- Ordination: 21 June 1974
- Consecration: 6 January 1989 by Pope John Paul II
- Rank: Bishop

Personal details
- Born: Justin Tetmu Samba; 12 December 1950 Mkuu-Rombo, Kilimanjaro Region, Tanzania
- Died: 23 August 2006 (aged 55) Muhimbili Hospital, Dar es Salaam, Tanzania

Styles of Justin Tetmu Samba
- Reference style: Your Lordship; The Most Reverend
- Spoken style: His Lordship
- Religious style: Bishop

Justin Tetmu Samba (12 December 1950 - 23 August 2006), was a Tanzanian Catholic prelate who served as bishop of the Roman Catholic Diocese of Musoma, Tanzania from 25 October 1988 until his death in office on 23 August 2006 at the age of 55 years. He was appointed by Pope John Paul II. He received his episcopal consecration on 6 January 1989 by the hands of Pope John Paul II himself. Bishop Justin Tetmu Samba died on 23 August 2006, four months shy of his 56th birthday.

== Early life and education ==
He was born in Mkuu-Rombo, Kilimanjaro Region, Tanzania on 12 December 1950. He studied philosophy and theology at seminary before he was ordained a priest.

== Priest ==
On 21 June 1974, he was ordained a priest for the Catholic Diocese of Musoma, Tanzania. He served as a priest until 25 October 1988.

== Bishop ==
On 25 October 1988, Pope John Paul II appointed Reverend Father Justin Tetmu Samba, previously a member of the clergy of the same Catholic See as the new Bishop of the Catholic Diocese of Musoma, Tanzania. He succeeded Anthony Peter Mayalla, who had been transferred to the Archdiocese of Mwanza and elevated to Archbishop there on 18 November 1987. Bishop Justin Tetmu Samba received his episcopal consecration on 6 January 1989. The Principal Consecrator was Pope John Paul II himself and was assisted by Edward Idris Cassidy, Titular Archbishop of Amantia and José Tomás Sánchez, Archbishop Emeritus of Nueva Segovia.

Bishop Justin Tetmu Samba died on 23 August 2006, at Muhimbili Hospital in Dar es Salaam, at the age of 55 years. On 10 November 2007, Pope Benedict XVI appointed Reverend Father Michael George Mabuga Msonganzila to succeed at Musoma.

== See also ==
- Catholic Church in Tanzania

== Succession table ==
Catholic Church titles
| Preceded by Anthony Peter Mayalla (12 January 1979 - 18 November 1987) | Bishop of Musoma (25 October 1988 - 23 August 2006) | Succeeded by Michael George Mabuga Msonganzila (since 10 November 2007) |
