= Febiana =

Febiana was city and former bishopric in Roman North Africa, which only remains a Latin Catholic titular see.

== History ==
Africa Proconsularis (125 AD)

Febina, in present-day Tunisia, was among the many cities of sufficient importance in the Roman province of Byzacena, in the papal sway, to become a suffragan diocese of the Metropolitan of Carthage, but was to fade so completely its remains weren’t found, plausibly at the seventh century advent of Islam.

Two of its bishops are historically documented :

- Successianus intervened at the Council of Carthage called in 484 by king Huneric of the Vandal Kingdom and was afterwards exiled, like most Catholic bishops, unlike their schismatic Donatist (heretical) counterparts (none reported for Febiana)
- Sallustius participated in a Council of Carthage in 641 against the heresy monothelitism.

== Titular see ==
The diocese was nominally restored in 1933 as the Latin titular bishopric of Febiana (Latin = Curiate Italian) / Febianen(sis) (Latin adjective). Below is a list of Catholic prelates who have held this title, of the fitting episcopal rank, with one archiepiscopal exception:

- Laurean Rugambwa (1951.12.13 – 1953.03.25) as only Apostolic Vicar of Lower Kagera (Tanzania) (1951.12.13 – 1953.03.25); next (see) promoted only Bishop of Rutabo (1953.03.25 – 1960.06.21 see suppressed as titular bishopric), created Cardinal-Priest of S. Francesco d’Assisi a Ripa Grande (1960.03.31 – death 1997.12.08), first Bishop of successor bishopric Bukoba (Tanzania) (1960.06.21 – 1968.12.19), Metropolitan Archbishop of Dar-es-Salaam (Tanzania) (1968.12.19 – 1992.07.22), President of Association of Member Episcopal Conferences in Eastern Africa (1970 – 1974)
- António De Campos (1954.08.28 – death 1969.08.09) as Auxiliary Bishop for Latin Patriarchate of Lisboa (Portugal) (1954.08.28 – 1969.08.09)
- Titular Archbishop: Antonio Guízar y Valencia (1969.08.24 – death 1971.08.04) as emeritate; previously last Bishop of Chihuahua (Mexico) (1920.07.20 – 1958.11.22), (see) promoted first Metropolitan Archbishop of Chihuahua (Mexico) (1958.11.22 – retired 1969.08.24)
- José Ruiseco Vieira (1971.12.10 – 1977.03.28)
- François Jacques Bussini (1977.12.12 – 1985.12.28)
- Mario Luis Bautista Maulión (1986.03.21 – 1995.05.08)
- Antal Majnek, Friars Minor (O.F.M.) (1995.12.09 – 2002.03.27)
- Marian Buczek (2002.05.04 – 2007.07.16)
- János Székely (2007.11.14 – 2017.06.18) as Auxiliary Bishop for Archdiocese Esztergom–Budapest (Hungary) (2007.11.14 – 2017.06.18); next Bishop of Szombathely (Hungary) (2017.06.18 – ...).
- Ramón Benito Ángeles Fernández (2017.07.01 – ) as Auxiliary Bishop for Archdiocese of Santo Domingo; retired from that post in 2024.

== See also ==
- List of Catholic dioceses in Tunisia
