= Almachius Vincent Rweyongeza =

Tanzanian Catholic prelate

The Most Reverend Almachius Vincent Rweyongeza
- Bishop of Kayanga
- Church: Catholic Church
- Archdiocese: Roman Catholic Archdiocese of Mwanza
- See: Kayanga
- Appointed: 14 August 2008
- Installed: 6 November 2008
- Predecessor: None
- Successor: Incumbent

Orders
- Ordination: 6 December 1981 by Nestorius Timanywa
- Consecration: 6 November 2008 by Polycarp Cardinal Pengo
- Rank: Bishop

Personal details
- Born: Almachius Vincent Rweyongeza; 1 January 1956 (age 69); Bushagara-Kamachumu, Diocese of Bukoba, Kagera Region, Tanzania

Styles of Almachius Vincent Rweyongeza
- Reference style: Your Lordship; The Most Reverend
- Spoken style: His Lordship
- Religious style: Bishop

Almachius Vincent Rweyongeza (born 1 January 1956) is a Tanzanian Catholic prelate who serves as the Bishop of the Roman Catholic Diocese of Kayanga. He was appointed bishop of Kayanga on 14 August 2008 by Pope Benedict XVI.

== Background and education ==
He was born on 1 January 1956, at Bushagara-Kamachumu, Bukoba District, in the Diocese of Bukoba, Kagera Region, in northwestern Tanzania. He attended primary school at the Rutabo Mission School and at the Rutabo Preparatory Seminary, graduating in 1970. He transferred to the Rubya Junior Seminary where he attended secondary school from 1971 until 1974.

He studied philosophy at the Ntungamo Major Seminary in Bukoba Diocese from 1975 until 1976. He then transferred to the St. Paul Major Seminary Kipalapala in Kipalapala, Archdiocese of Tabora, where he studied Theology from 1977 until 1981. From 1986, he studied at the Pontifical Urban University in Rome, Italy where he graduated with a Licentiate in Biblical Theology in 1988.

== Priesthood ==
He was ordained a priest of the diocese of Bukoba on 6 December 1981 by Bishop Nestorius Timanywa, Bishop of Bukoba. He served in that capacity until 14 August 2008.

As a priest he served in various roles inside and outside his diocese including as:

- Parish vicar in a parish in Bukoba from 1982 until 1983
- Pastor of a parish in Mungana, Diocese of Bukoba from 1984 until 1985
- Professor at the Segerea Major Seminary in the Archdiocese of Dar es Salaam from 1985 until 1986
- Professor of Sacred Scripture in the Ntungamo Major Seminary in Bukoba Diocese from 1989 until 1999
- Vice-Rector of the Ntungamo Major Seminary from 1989 until 1999
- Vicar General of the Diocese of Bukoba since 1999.

== As bishop ==
On 14 Aug 2008 Pope Benedict XVI created the Roman Catholic Diocese of Kayanga by splitting the erstwhile Diocese of Rulenge (now Rulenge-Ngara). Both the new diocese and its mother diocese remained as Suffragans of the Metropolitan Ecclesiastic Province of Mwanza. The Holy Father appointed Monsignor Almachius Vincent Rweyongeza as the founding bishop of Kayanga Diocese.

He was consecrated and installed outside the Kayanga Catholic Cathedral, in Kayanga, in the Diocese of Kayanga on 6 November 2008 by the hands of Polycarp Cardinal Pengo, Archbishop of Dar-es-Salaam assisted by Bishop Severine Niwemugizi, Bishop of Rulenge-Ngara and Bishop Nestorius Timanywa, Bishop of Bukoba.

== See also ==
- Catholic Church in Tanzania

== Succession table ==
Catholic Church titles
Preceded by None (Diocese created on 14 August 2008)	Bishop of Kayanga (Since 14 August 2008)	Succeeded by Incumbent
