= Thomas John Kiangio =

Tanzanian Catholic prelate

The Most Reverend Thomas John Kiangio
- Bishop of Tanga
- Church: Catholic Church
- Archdiocese: Dar es Salaam
- See: Tanga
- Appointed: 7 June 2023
- Installed: 3 September 2023
- Predecessor: Titus Joseph Mdoe
- Previous post: Administrator Diocese of Tanga (20 December 2020 until 7 June 2023)

Orders
- Ordination: 16 July 1997
- Consecration: 3 September 2023 by Jude Thaddaeus Ruwa'ichi

Personal details
- Born: Thomas John Kiangio; 17 March 1965 (age 61) Mazinde Ngua, Diocese of Tanga, Tanzania

Thomas John Kiangio (born 17 March 1965) is a Tanzanian prelate of the Catholic Church who is the Bishop of the Roman Catholic Diocese of Tanga, Tanzania. He was appointed bishop on 7 June 2023 by Pope Francis.

== Early life and education ==
He was born on 17 March 1965 in Mazinde Ngua, Diocese of Tanga, Tanga District, Tanga Region in Tanzania.

He attended primary school in his home area. He attended Saint Antony's Seminary Ntungamo in the Catholic Diocese of Bukoba. He then transferred to the Charles Lwanga Major Seminary Segerea in the Archdiocese of Dar es Salaam. Later, from 1999 until 2003, he pursued a higher degree courses from the Pontifical Urban University in Rome. He holds both a Licentiate and a Doctorate in Dogmatic Theology from the Pontifical Urbaniana University in Rome.

== Priest ==
He was ordained deacon on 1 January 1997 for the Diocese of Tanga, Tanzania. On 16 July 1997 he was ordained priest of Tanga Diocese.

While a priest, he served in various roles, including as:

- Assistant parish priest at Lushoto Parish between 1997 and 1998
- Formator, lecturer, assistant rector and finally rector of the St. Joseph Soni Junior Seminary in Tanga, from 1998 until 1999 and from 2004 until 2013.

Pope Francis appointed Father Thomas John Kiangio as administrator of the Diocese of Tanga, on 20 December 2020, while Kangio was still a priest. This followed the death of the late bishop Anthony Mathias Banzi, who died on 20 December 2020.

== Bishop ==
On 7 June 2023, Pope Francis appointed him as bishop and assigned him to the Diocese of Tanga.

He was consecrated and installed on 3 September 2023 at St. Anthony of Padua Cathedral, Tanga, Diocese of Tanga by Archbishop Jude Thaddaeus Ruwa'ichi, Archbishop of Dar es Salaam assisted by Bishop Titus Joseph Mdoe, Bishop of Mtwara and Bishop Joseph Roman Mlola, Bishop of Kigoma.

== See also ==
- Catholic Church in Tanzania

== Succession table ==
Catholic Church titles
| Preceded by Anthony Mathias Banzi (10 June 1994 - 20 December 2020) | Bishop of Tanga (since 7 June 2023) | Succeeded by Incumbent |
