= Burkard Huwiler =

Burkhard Huwiler M. Afr.
- Vicar Apostolic of Bukoba
- Installed: 18 March 1929
- Term ended: 20 March 1946
- Successor: Laurent Tétrault
- Other post: Titular Bishop of Vazari (18 March 1929 - 1 October 1954)

Orders
- Ordination: 2 July 1893
- Consecration: 14 July 1929 by Bishop Joseph Sweens

Personal details
- Born: 7 April 1868 Buttwil, Switzerland
- Died: 1 October 1954 (aged 86) Bukoba, Tanzania

Burkhard Huwiler, M.Afr. (7 April 1868 – 1 October 1954), was a Swiss Roman Catholic bishop who served as a missionary in Africa from 1929 to 1946.

Huwiler was born in Buttwil, in the Canton of Aargau, the son of Martin Leonz and Ana Maria Barbara Huwiler. He attended a gymnasium in Einsiedeln, after which, in 1887, he entered the seminary of the Missionaries of Africa (traditionally known as the White Fathers), determined to serve in the missions there. At the age of 25, on 2 July 1893, he was ordained a priest. Before his pastoral work in central Africa, he traveled for four years throughout Germany, Austria and Switzerland, charged with raising funds for the work of his congregation. In 1897 he was sent to serve in the region of Lake Victoria, then part of German East Africa. Two years later he had to return home to Switzerland due to his health, where he remained until 1904, when he returned to Africa.

Due to his nationality, Huwiler was able to remain at his post after World War I, when Germany lost this colony and it became a League of Nations mandate, to be administered by the United Kingdom, called the Tanganyika Territory. In March 1929 Huwiler was named by Pope Pius XI to head the newly created Vicariate Apostolic of Bukoba (now the Roman Catholic Diocese of Rulenge-Ngara) and titular bishop of Vazaritanus. He was consecrated on the following 14 July by Bishop Joseph Sweens, M.Afr.

Huwiler resigned his office on 20 March 1946 and died in Bukoba, where he was buried, in keeping with the practice of his congregation.
