= Simon Chibuga Masondole =

Tanzanian Catholic prelate

The Most Reverend Simon Chibuga Masondole
- Bishop of Bunda
- Church: Catholic Church
- Archdiocese: Roman Catholic Archdiocese of Mwanza
- See: Bunda
- Appointed: 6 April 2021
- Installed: 4 July 2021
- Predecessor: Renatus Leonard Nkwande

Orders
- Ordination: 2 July 2006
- Consecration: 4 July 2021 by Renatus Leonard Nkwande
- Rank: Bishop

Personal details
- Born: Simon Chibuga Masondole; 2 October 1972 (age 53) Bukiko Village, Ukerewe District, Diocese of Mwanza, Tanzania
- Motto: "Ili tuwe watakatifu katika pendo" (That we may be holy in love)

Styles of Simon Chibuga Masondole
- Reference style: Your Lordship; The Most Reverend
- Spoken style: His Lordship
- Religious style: Bishop

Simon Chibuga Masondole (born 25 October 1972) is a Tanzanian Catholic prelate who serves as Bishop of the Roman Catholic Diocese of Bunda. He was appointed Bishop of Bunda on 6 April 2021 by Pope Francis. Before that, he served as priest of Bunda.

== Background and education ==
He was born on 2 October 1972, at Bukiko Village, Ukerewe District, Diocese of Mwanza, Tanzania. He studied philosophy at Our Lady of the Angels Major Seminary in Kibosho, in the Diocese of Moshi from 1998 until 2001. He then transferred to the Saint Charles Lwanga Major Seminary in Segerea, in the Metropolitan Archdiocese of Dar es Salaam, where he studied Theology from 2001 until 2006.

Later, he studied liturgy at the Santa Giustina Institute of Pastoral Liturgy in Padua, Italy from 2008 until 2012. He also studied in Rome at the Pontifical Saint Anselm Athenaeum from 2012 until 2016.

== Priesthood ==
On 25 January 2006 he was ordained Deacon of Mwanza, Tanzania at St. Karoli Lwanga Major Seminary, at Segerea, Archdiocese of Dar es Salaam. He was ordained priest of the archdiocese of Mwanza at Nyamanga Church, Ukerewe District, Archdiocese of Mwanza. He served in that capacity until 27 November 2010. On 27 November 2010 Father Simon Chibuga Masondole was incardinated Priest of Bunda, Tanzania. He served in that capacity until 6 April 2021.

As priest he served in various roles inside and outside of his diocese including as:

- Parish assistant in the Kahangala Parish, Mwanza in 2006
- Vice-director of the Diocesan Office for the Liturgy in Mwanza
- Parish assistant at the Nansio Parish in Bunda from 2006 until 2008
- Parish assistant in Conselve, Italy from 2009 until 2012
- Pastoral service provider in the diocese of Tortona, Italy from 2015 until 2018.
- Parish administrator Archdiocese of Mwanza
- Director of the Saint Francis of Assisi Nursery and Primary School
- President of the Priests' Union in Bunda.

== As bishop ==
He was appointed Bishop of the Roman Catholic Diocese of Bunda, Tanzania on 6 April 2021. On 4 July 2021, he received episcopal consecration and was installed at the grounds of Saint Paul's Cathedral Bunda, Diocese of Bunda at the hands of Archbishop Renatus Leonard Nkwande, Archbishop of Mwanza assisted by Bishop Flavian Matindi Kassala, Bishop of Geita and Bishop Joseph Roman Mlola, Bishop of Kigoma.

Bishop Simon Chibuga Masondole advocates for more collaboration in the Catholic Church between Europe and Africa.

== See also ==
- Catholic Church in Tanzania

== Succession table ==
Catholic Church titles
Preceded by Renatus Leonard Nkwande (27 November 2010 - 11 February 2019)	Bishop of Bunda (Since 6 April 2021)	Succeeded by Incumbent
