= Gabriel Mmole =

Tanzanian Roman Catholic bishop (1939–2019)

- Bishop of Mtwara
- Church: Catholic Church
- Diocese: Diocese of Mtwara
- In office: 12 March 1988 – 15 October 2015
- Predecessor: Maurus Libaba
- Successor: Titus Joseph Mdoe

Orders
- Ordination: 14 October 1971
- Consecration: 25 May 1988 by Laurean Rugambwa

Personal details
- Born: 1939 Nangoo (northeast of Ndanda), mandatory Tanganyika Territory, British Empire
- Died: 15 May 2019 (aged 79–80) Mtwara, Mtwara Region, Tanzania

Gabriel Mmole (1939 – 15 May 2019) was a Tanzanian Roman Catholic prelate. Born in Nangoo, Mmole was ordained to the priesthood in 1971. He was appointed Bishop of Mtwara in 1988 and served until Pope Francis accepted his resignation on 15 October 2015 and named Titus Joseph Mdoe to succeed him.

Mmole died following a long illness on 15 May 2019 in Mtwara, at the age of 80.
