= Salutaris Melchior Libena =

Tanzanian Catholic prelate

The Most Reverend Salutaris Melchior Libena
- Bishop of Ifakara, Tanzania
- Church: Catholic Church
- Archdiocese: Roman Catholic Archdiocese of Dar es Salaam
- See: Ifakara
- Appointed: 14 January 2012
- Installed: 14 January 2012
- Predecessor: None
- Successor: Incumbent
- Other post: Auxiliary Bishop of Dar es Salaam (28 January 2010 - 14 January 2012)

Orders
- Ordination: 29 June 1991 by Patrick Iteka
- Consecration: 19 March 2010 by Polycarp Cardinal Pengo
- Rank: Bishop

Personal details
- Born: Salutaris Melchior Libena; 23 November 1963 (age 62) Itete, Busokelo District, Mbeya Region, Tanzania

Styles of Salutaris Melchior Libena
- Reference style: Your Lordship; The Most Reverend
- Spoken style: His Lordship
- Religious style: Bishop

Salutaris Melchior Libena (born 23 November 1963) is a Tanzanian Catholic prelate who serves as the Bishop of the Roman Catholic Diocese of Ifakara, Tanzania. He was appointed bishop of Ifakara on 14 January 2012. Previously, he served as Auxiliary Bishop of Dar es Salaam from 28 January 2010 until 14 January 2012. Pope Benedict XVI appointed him bishop on 28 January 2010.

== Background and education ==
He was born on 23 November 1963, at Itete, Busokelo District, Mbeya Region, in southwestern Tanzania. He completed his primary school studies in 1978 in Ifakara, Morogoro Region. He attended Kasita Minor Seminary from 1979 until 1982, completing Senior Four there. He then transferred to the Mafinga Minor Seminary in the Diocese of Iringa, where he completed Senior Six. He studied at St. Augustine's Major Seminary in Peramiho for formation. From 1999, he studied at the Pontifical Atheneum of St. Anselm in Rome, graduating in 2001 with a Licentiate in Sacred Liturgy.

== Priesthood ==
He was ordained a priest of the diocese of Mahenge on 29 June 1991 by Bishop Patrick Iteka of the Diocese of Mahenge, Tanzania. He served in that capacity until 28 January 2010.

He is a member of the religions order of "Ordo Communionis in Christo" (English: Order of Communion In Christ), that was founded in Germany in 1984. As of July 2023, Bishop Salutaris Melchior Libena was the only bishop in the world who belonged to the order.

As priest, he served in several roles inside and outside his diocese including as:

- Biology teacher and formator at the St. Francis Minor Seminary in Kasita from 1991 until 1995
- Dean for the Discipline from 1991 until 1995
- Pastor in Sofi Parish from 1995 until 1998
- Dean of ITET Parish from 1995 until 1998
- Rector of St. Patrick's Seminary Preliminary Course, from 1999 until 2001
- Professor of Religion the Minor Seminary in Kasita between 2002 and 2003
- Formator at the Minor Seminary in Kasita between 2002 and 2003
- Professor at Ntungamo Major Seminary in the Diocese of Bukoba between 2002 and 2003
- Professor, Spiritual Director, and Academic Dean at the St. Paul's Theological Major Seminary in Kipalapala.

== As bishop ==
On 28 January 2010 Pope Benedict XVI appointed him Auxiliary Bishop of Dar es Salaam. He was contemporaneously appointed Titular Bishop of Sutunurca.

He was consecrated and installed at Dar es Salaam in Dar es Salaam Archdiocese on 19 March 2010 by the hands of Polycarp Cardinal Pengo, Archbishop of Dar es Salaam assisted by Bishop Jude Thaddaeus Ruwa'ichi, Bishop of Dodoma and Bishop Almachius Vincent Rweyongeza, Bishop of Kayanga.

On 14 January 2012, The Holy Father created the Roman Catholic Diocese of Ifakara by splitting it from the diocese of Mahenge and making the new diocese a Suffragan of the Archdioceses of Dar es Salaam. On the same day, Pope Benedict XVI appointed Bishop Salutaris Melchior Libena to be the founder bishop of the new diocese.

== See also ==
- Catholic Church in Tanzania

== Succession table ==
Catholic Church titles
Preceded by	Auxiliary Bishop of Dar es Salaam (28 January 2010 - 14 January 2012)	Succeeded by
Preceded by None (Diocese created on 14 January 2012)	Bishop of Ifakara (Since 14 January 2012)	Succeeded by Incumbent
