= Roman Catholic Diocese of Tanga =

Roman Catholic diocese in Tanzania, Africa

Coordinates: 6.8°S 39.2833°E

Diocese of Tanga Dioecesis Tangaënsis

Location
- Country: Tanzania
- Metropolitan: Dar-es-Salaam

Statistics
- Area: 26,807 km^{2} (10,350 sq mi)
- Population: Total; Catholics: (as of 2004); 1,650,000; 180,000 (10.9%)

Information
- Rite: Latin Rite

Current leadership
- Pope: Leo XIV
- Bishop: Thomas John Kiangio

The Roman Catholic Diocese of Tanga (Latin: Dioecesis Tangaënsis) is a diocese located in the city of Tanga in the ecclesiastical province of Dar-es-Salaam in Tanzania.

== History ==
- April 18, 1950: Established as Apostolic Prefecture of Tanga from the Apostolic Vicariate of Kilima-Njaro
- February 24, 1958: Promoted as Diocese of Tanga

== Bishops ==
- Prefect Apostolic of Tanga (Roman rite)
  - Fr. Eugène Cornelius Arthurs, I.C. (1950.06.09 – 1958.02.24 see below)
- Bishops of Tanga (Roman rite)
  - Bishop Eugène Cornelius Arthurs, I.C. (see above 1958.02.24 – 1969.12.15)
  - Bishop Maurus Gervase Komba (1969.12.15 – 1988.01.18)
  - Bishop Telesphore Richard Mkude (1988.01.18 – 1993.04.05), appointed Bishop of Morogoro
  - Bishop Anthony Mathias Banzi (1994.06.10 – 2020.12.20)
  - Thomas John Kiangio (Since 7 June 2023)

=== Other priest of this diocese who became bishop ===
- Titus Joseph Mdoe, appointed auxiliary bishop of Dar-es-Salaam in 2013

== See also ==
- Roman Catholicism in Tanzania

== Sources ==
- GCatholic.org
- Catholic Hierarchy
