= Agapiti Ndorobo =

Tanzanian Catholic prelate

The Most Reverend Agapiti Ndorobo
- Bishop of Mahenge
- Church: Catholic Church
- Archdiocese: Roman Catholic Archdiocese of Dar es Salaam
- See: Mahenge
- Appointed: 3 March 1995
- Installed: 16 June 1995
- Predecessor: Patrick Iteka
- Successor: Incumbent

Orders
- Ordination: 6 December 1980
- Consecration: 16 June 1995 by Polycarp Cardinal Pengo

Personal details
- Born: Agapiti Ndorobo; 14 August 1954 (age 70); Kidulo, Diocese of Dodoma, Tanzania

Agapiti Ndorobo (born 14 August 1954) is a Tanzanian Roman Catholic prelate who is the Bishop of the Roman Catholic Diocese of Mahenge, Tanzania. He was appointed bishop of Mahenge on 3 March 1995 by Pope John Paul II.

== Early life and education ==
He was born on 14 August 1954 in Kidulo, in the Catholic Diocese of Kondoa, in the Dodoma Region, Tanzania. He studied in Tanzanian seminaries to become a priest.

== Priest ==
He was ordained priest of Dodoma on 6 December 1980. He served in that role until 3 March 1995.

== Bishop ==
On 3 March 1995 the Holy Father appointed him Bishop of the Diocese of Mahenge, Tanzania. He was consecrated and installed on 16 June 1995 at Christ the King Cathedral, in Mahenge, Diocese of Mahenge. The Principal Consecrator was Archbishop Polycarp Cardinal Pengo, Archbishop of Dar-es-Salaam assisted by Bishop Matthias Joseph Isuja, Bishop of Dodoma and Bishop Telesphore Richard Mkude, Bishop of Morogoro.

Among the development projects and social programs the bishop has led in his diocese are the efforts to eradicate tuberculosis from the community.

== See also ==
- Catholic Church in Tanzania

== Succession table ==
Catholic Church titles
Preceded by Patrick Iteka (14 June 1973 to 22 August 1883)	Bishop of Mahenge (since 3 March 1995)	Succeeded by Incumbent
