= Liberatus Sangu =

Tanzanian Catholic prelate (born 1945)

The Most Reverend Liberatus Sangu
- Bishop of Shinyanga, Tanzania
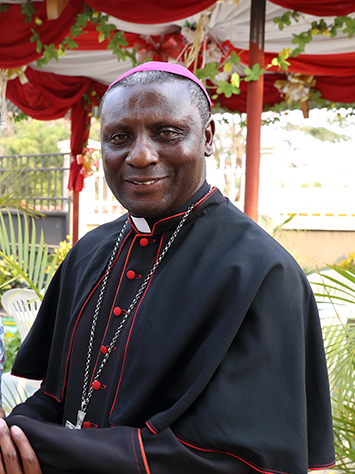
- Church: Catholic Church
- Archdiocese: Roman Catholic Archdiocese of Mwanza
- See: Shinyanga
- Appointed: 2 February 2015
- Installed: 12 April 2015
- Predecessor: Aloysius Balina
- Successor: Incumbent

Orders
- Ordination: 9 July 1994
- Consecration: 12 April 2015 by Polycarp Cardinal Pengo
- Rank: Bishop

Personal details
- Born: Liberatus Sangu; 19 February 1963 (age 63) Mwazye, Diocese of Sumbawanga, Tanzania

Styles of Liberatus Sangu
- Reference style: Your Lordship; The Most Reverend
- Spoken style: His Lordship
- Religious style: Bishop

Liberatus Sangu (born 19 February 1963) is a Tanzanian Catholic prelate who serves as the Bishop of the Roman Catholic Diocese of Shinyanga, Tanzania since 2015. He was appointed bishop of Shinyanga on 2 February 2015 by Pope Francis.

== Early life and education ==
He was born on 19 February 1963 in Mwazye Village in the Diocese of Sumbawanga, Tanzania. He attended primary and secondary schools in his home area. He studied philosophy at Kibosho Major Seminary in Moshi. He then studied theology at St. Charles Lwanga Segerea Seminary, in Dar-es-Salaam. Later, he studied sacramental theology at the Pontifical Athenaeum of Saint Anselm in Rome.

== Priest ==
He was ordained a priest of the Roman Catholic Diocese of Sumbawanga on 9 July 1994. He served in that capacity until 2 February 2015.

== Bishop ==
On 2 February 2015, Pope Francis appointed him as Bishop of the Roman Catholic Diocese of Shinyanga. On 12 April 2015, he was consecrated and installed at Shinyanga by the hands of Polycarp Cardinal Pengo, Archbishop of Dar es Salaam assisted by Archbishop Jude Thaddaeus Ruwa'ichi, Archbishop of Mwanza and Archbishop Protase Rugambwa, Bishop Emeritus of Kigoma. In July 2024, Bishop Liberatus Sangu celebrated 30 years of priesthood and 9 years as Bishop.

== See also ==
- Catholic Church in Tanzania

Catholic Church titles
Preceded by Aloysius Balina (8 August 1997 to 6 November 2012)	Bishop of Shinyanga (since 2 February 2015)	Succeeded by Incumbent
