= Kindimba =

- Village
- Location in Tanzania
- Coordinates: 10°57′S 34°56′E
- Country: Tanzania
- Region: Ruvuma Region
- District: Mbinga

Population (2006)
  - Total: 2,440
- Time zone: UTC+3 (EAT)

Kindimba is a village in Mbinga district in the Ruvuma Region of the Tanzanian Southern Highlands. It is the historical centre of the Matengo Highlands and of the Matengo people. It is located on highland's western side, approximately 15 kilometres (9.3 mi) west of Mbinga. In 2006, the total Kindimba population was 2,440.
