= Placidus Nkalanga =

Tanzanian Benedictine monk and Bishop emeritus of Bukoba

Right Reverend, Placidus Gervasius Nkalanga OSB
- Bishop Emeritus of Diocese of Bukoba, Tanzania
- Church: Roman Catholic Church
- See: Diocese of Bukoba
- In office: 1969 - 1973
- Predecessor: Laurean Rugambwa
- Successor: Nestorius Timanywa
- Previous posts: Titular Bishop of Balbura (18 April 1961 – 6 March 1969); Auxiliary Bishop of Bukoba (Tanzania) (18 April 1961 – 6 March 1969); Apostolic Administrator of Kabale (Uganda) (1 February 1966 – 29 May 1969); President of Tanzania Episcopal Conference (1969 – 1970); Bishop of Bukoba (Tanzania) (6 March 1969 – 26 November 1973)

Orders
- Ordination: 15 July 1950
- Consecration: 21 May 1961 by Pope John XXIII
- Rank: Bishop Emeritus

Personal details
- Born: Gervasius Nkalanga; 19 June 1919 Ruti, Missenyi District, Tanganyika
- Died: 18 December 2015 (aged 96) St. Joseph Mission Hospital, Peramiho, Songea, Tanzania
- Buried: Hanga Abbey cemetery 10°26′26.925″S 35°47′37.218″E
- Denomination: Catholicism
- Residence: Hanga Abbey, Songea

Placidus Gervasius Nkalanga, OSB (Born Gervasius Nkalanga;19 June 1919 – 18 December 2015) was a Tanzanian Prelate of the Roman Catholic Church. He was a monk of the St Maurus & St Placidus Hanga Abbey in Hanga, Ruvuma Region, Tanzania, a Benedictine monastery of the Congregation of Missionary Benedictines of Saint Ottilien. He lived there for 42 years, from his resignation from the episcopate in 1973 until his death in 2015.

== Biography ==
Gervasius Nkalanga was born on 19 June 1919 in Ruti, Missenyi District, Tanganyika, Nkalanga was ordained a priest on 15 July 1950. He was consecrated on 21 May 1961 by Pope John XXIII after being appointed Auxiliary Bishop of Bukoba and Titular Bishop of Balbura on 18 April 1961. The new bishop attended the Second Vatican Council from 1962 to 1965, missing only Session Two running from 29 September 1963 to 4 December 1963. Between February 1966 and 29 May 1969 he served as the first Apostolic Administrator of the Roman Catholic Diocese of Kabale in Western Uganda after it was just established in ecclesiastical province of Mbarara. In Uganda he was revered notably for his evangelical simplicity and persuasive personality which made him an ideal leader.

On 6 March 1969 Gervasius was appointed Bishop of the Diocese of Bukoba. Also, served as President of the Episcopal Conference of Tanzania from 1969 to 1970. His appointment followed the promotion of the late Cardinal Laurean Rugambwa to Archbishop of Dar-es-Salaam. He remained in this position until his resignation on 26 November 1973 when he joined the Monastic Order of Saint Benedict in Hanga, Songea. He went through all the steps of religious formation as required. Upon completion of his formation he obtained a name Frt. (Brother) Placidus, OSB in honor of St. Placidus. On 28 December 2015 Nkalanga died in Peramiho, Songea, a Benedictine abbey in Southwestern Tanzania. At the time of his death he was the oldest living Catholic bishop in Africa and 18th oldest in the world.
