= Roman Catholic Diocese of Morogoro =

Roman Catholic diocese in Tanzania, Africa

Coordinates: 6.824167°S 37.663333°E

Diocese of Morogoro Dioecesis Morogoroënsis

Location
- Country: Tanzania
- Metropolitan: Dar-es-Salaam

Statistics
- Area: 43,380 km^{2} (16,750 sq mi)
- Population: Total; Catholics: (as of 2004); 1,313,131; 534,443 (40.7%)

Information
- Rite: Latin Rite
- Cathedral: St Patrick Cathedral
- Patron saint: Saint Patrick

Current leadership
- Pope: Leo XIV
- Bishop: Lazarus Vitalis Msimbe
- Bishops emeritus: Telesphore Mkude

The Roman Catholic Diocese of Morogoro (Latin: Dioecesis Morogoroënsis) is a diocese located in the city of Morogoro in the ecclesiastical province of Dar-es-Salaam in Tanzania.

== History ==
- May 11, 1906: Established as Apostolic Vicariate of Central Zanguebar from the Apostolic Vicariate of Zanzibar
- December 21, 1906: Renamed as Apostolic Vicariate of Bagamoyo
- March 25, 1953: Promoted as Diocese of Morogoro

== Leadership ==
- Vicars Apostolic of Bagamoyo (Roman rite)
  - Bishop François-Xavier Vogt, C.S.Sp. (1906.07.25 – 1923.05.19), appointed Vicar Apostolic of Cameroun
  - Bishop Bartholomew Stanley Wilson, C.S.Sp. (1924.01.09 – 1933.05.23), appointed Vicar Apostolic of Sierra Leone
  - Bishop Bernardo Gerardo Hilhorst, C.S.Sp. (1934.02.26 – 1953.03.25 see below)
- Bishops of Morogoro (Roman rite)
  - Bishop Bernardo Gerardo Hilhorst, C.S.Sp. (see above 1953.03.25 – 1954.08.11)
  - Bishop Herman Jan van Elswijk, C.S.Sp. (1954.07.18 – 1966.12.15)
  - Bishop Adriani Mkoba (1966.12.15 – 1992.11.06)
  - Bishop Telesphore Richard Mkude Bishop: (from 5 April 1993 until 30 December 2020) Bishop Emeritus: (since 20 December 2020)
  - Father Lazarus Vitalis Msimbe S.D.S. (2019.02.13 – 2021.05.31) Apostolic administrator sede plena
  - Bishop Lazarus Vitalis Msimbe S.D.S (2021.05.31 - present)

== See also ==
- Roman Catholicism in Tanzania
