= Lazarus Vitalis Msimbe =

Tanzanian Catholic prelate

The Most Reverend Bishop Lazarus Vitalis Msimbe S.D.S.
- Bishop of Morogoro
- Church: Catholic Church
- Archdiocese: Dar es Salaam
- See: Morogoro
- Appointed: 31 May 2021
- Installed: 19 September 2021
- Predecessor: Telesphore Richard Mkude
- Previous post: Apostolic Administrator Roman Catholic Diocese of Morogoro (13 February 2019 until 31 May 2021)

Orders
- Ordination: 21 June 1998
- Consecration: 19 September 2021 by Marek Solczyński

Personal details
- Born: Lazarus Vitalis Msimbe; 27 December 1963 (age 62) Homboza, Diocese of Morogoro, Tanzania
- Motto: "Omnia Vincit Amor" (Love Conquers All)

Styles of Lazarus Vitalis Msimbe
- Reference style: Your Lordship; The Most Reverend
- Spoken style: His Lordship
- Religious style: Bishop

Lazarus Vitalis Msimbe, S.D.S. (born 27 December 1963) is a Tanzanian Catholic prelate who is the Bishop of the Roman Catholic Diocese of Morogoro, Tanzania. Before he was appointed bishop, he served as Apostolic Administrator of the Diocese of Morogoro, from 13 February 2019 until 31 May 2021, while still a priest. He was appointed bishop on 13 February 2019 by Pope Francis.

== Early life and education ==
He was born on 27 December 1963 in Homboza, Morogoro District, Morogoro Region, in the Diocese of Morogoro, in Tanzania.

He attended elementary school in his home area. He studied philosophy at Our Lady of the Angels Major Seminary in Kibosho, in the diocese of Moshi, from 1990 until 1993. He then transferred to Saint Charles Lwanga Senior Seminary in Segerea, in the Metropolitan Archdiocese of Dar es Salaam, where he studied Theology from 1993 until 1998. Later, he studied civil law and canon law, graduating with a Doctorate degree, awarded by Heythrop College, a component of the University of London, at the time.

== Priest ==
While still in seminary, he joined the Society of the Divine Saviour (SDS) also known as Salvatorians. He professed to be a member of the SDS on 8 December 1987. He then took his perpetual vows as a member of the Order of Salvatorians on 8 December 1994. He was ordained priest of the Society of the Divine Savior, on 21 June 1998.

While a priest, he served in various roles including as:

- Priest in Lukuledi Parish in the diocese of Tunduru-Masasi, in 1988
- Director of seminaries and vocations for the province of the Salvatorian Fathers in Tanzania from 1998 until 2002
- Master of Salvatorian novices in Nakapanya, the Diocese of Tunduru-Masasi from 2002 until 2005
- Provincial superior of the institute in Tanzania from 2005 until 2011.
- Provider of pastoral service in a number of parishes in the London area, England, United Kingdom from 2012 until 2016
- Formator of Salvatorian seminarians at Jordan University College in Morogoro
- Bursar of the community
- Vice-superior provincial of the Salvatorians in Tanzania from 2017 until February 2019.

He was appointed the apostolic administrator of the Diocese of Morogoro on 13 February 2019, serving in that capacity until 31 May 2021.

== Bishop ==
On 31 May 2021 Pope Francis appointed Monsignor Lazarus Vitalis Msimbe, as the Ordinary of the diocese of Morogoro. He was consecrated and installed on 19 September 2021 at the hands of Archbishop Marek Solczyński, Titular Archbishop of Caesarea in Mauretania assisted by Archbishop Jude Thaddaeus Ruwa'ichi, Archbishop of Dar-es-Salaam and Bishop Telesphore Richard Mkude, Bishop Emeritus of Morogoro.

== See also ==
- Catholic Church in Tanzania

== Succession table ==
Catholic Church titles
Preceded by Telesphore Richard Mkude (5 April - 30 December 2020)	Bishop of Morogoro; Since (31 May 2021	Succeeded by Incumbent
