= Anthony Peter Mayalla =

Tanzanian Catholic prelate

The Most Reverend Anthony Peter Mayalla
- Archbishop of Mwanza (Deceased)
- Church: Catholic Church
- Archdiocese: Roman Catholic Archdiocese of Mwanza
- See: Mwanza
- Appointed: 18 November 1987
- Installed: 28 February 1988
- Term ended: 19 August 2009
- Predecessor: Renatus Lwamosa Butibubage
- Successor: Jude Thaddaeus Ruwa'ichi
- Other post: Bishop of Musoma (12 January 1979 - 18 November 1987)

Orders
- Ordination: 20 December 1970 by Renatus Lwamosa Butibubage
- Consecration: 22 April 1979 by Laurean Cardinal Rugambwa
- Rank: Bishop

Personal details
- Born: Anthony Peter Mayalla; April 25, 1940 Ibindo-Kwimba, Diocese of Mwanza, Mwanza Region, Tanzania
- Died: 19 August 2009 (aged 69) Bugando Medical Centre, Mwanza City

Styles of Anthony Peter Mayalla
- Reference style: Your Lordship; The Most Reverend
- Spoken style: His Lordship
- Religious style: Bishop

Anthony Peter Mayalla (25 April 1940 - 19 August 2009), also Anthony Petro Mayalla, was Tanzanian Catholic prelate who served as the Archbishop of the Roman Catholic Archdiocese of Mwanza. He was appointed archbishop of Mwanza on 18 November 1987. He previously served as Bishop of the Roman Catholic Diocese of Musoma between 1979 and 1987. He was appointed bishop on 12 January 1979 by Pope John Paul II. He died on 19 August 2009 aged 69 years.

== Background and education ==
He was born on 25 April 1940, at Ibindo-Kwimba, Kwimba District, Mwanza Region, Tanzania. He attended primary and secondary school in Kwimba District. He studied at the St. Mary's Minor Seminary Nyegezi in the Archdiocese of Mwanza. He then transferred to the St. Paul's Major Seminary in Kipalapala Tabora, before he was ordained priest.

He studied at Loyola University in Chicago in the United States, from 1973, graduating from there with a degree in education in 1975.

== Priesthood ==
On 20 December 1970, he was ordained a priest of the diocese of Mwanza at Ibindo Parish, by Bishop Renatus Lwamosa Butibubage, Bishop of Mwanza. He served in that capacity until 12 January 1979.

== As bishop ==
Pope John Paul II appointed him as Bishop of the Roman Catholic Diocese of Musoma on 12 January 1979. He was consecrated and installed at Musoma on 22 April 1979 by the hands of Laurean Cardinal Rugambwa, Archbishop of Dar-es-Salaam assisted by Bishop John James Rudin, Bishop Emeritus of Musoma and Bishop Renatus Lwamosa Butibubage, Bishop of Mwanza.

On 18 November 1987, The Holy Father appointed him Archbishop of the Metropolitan Ecclesiastical Province of Mwanza. He was formally installed there as archbishop on 28 February 1988. He was the first archbishop to serve the province of Mwanza following its elevation from a diocese. He served in that capacity until his death on 19 August 2009.

== Illness and death ==
Archbishop Mayalla fell ill suddenly on the morning of 19 August 2009. He was rushed to Bugando Medical Centre in Mwanza for evaluation and management. At the hospital, he was diagnosed as being in the process of having a heart attack. Despite the best efforts of the medical team treating him, he died at about 2.30 p.m. that afternoon. He was 69 years old.

== Legacy ==
He served as the chairman of the board of the Catholic University of Eastern Africa (CUAEA), for over ten years. Archbishop Anthony Peter Mayalla is credited with founding of both Bugando Medical Centre, where he died and Saint Augustine University of Tanzania (SAUT), also in Mwanza City. He also served as the president of the Council of Tanzania Episcopal Conference (TEC Council), beginning in June 1983 and ending in 1989.

== See also ==
- Catholic Church in Tanzania

== Succession table ==
Catholic Church titles
Preceded by John James Rudin (5 July 1957 - 12 January 1979)	Bishop of Musoma (12 January 1979 - 18 November 1987)	Succeeded by Justin Tetmu Samba
Preceded by Renatus Lwamosa Butibubage (18 December 1965 - 18 November 1987)	Archbishop of Mwanza (18 November 1987 - 19 August 2009)	Succeeded by Jude Thaddaeus Ruwa'ichi
