= Roman Catholic Diocese of Shinyanga =

Roman Catholic diocese in Tanzania, Africa

Coordinates: 3.661944°S 33.423056°E

Diocese of Shinyanga Dioecesis Shinyangaënsis

Location
- Country: Tanzania
- Metropolitan: Mwanza

Statistics
- Area: 30,000 km^{2} (12,000 sq mi)
- Population: Total; Catholics: (as of 2004); 2,001,893; 284,590 (14.2%)

Information
- Rite: Latin Rite

Current leadership
- Pope: Leo XIV
- Bishop: Bishop Liberatus Sangu (appointed by Pope Francis on Monday, February 2, 2015; ordained and installed April 12)

The Roman Catholic Diocese of Shinyanga (Latin: Dioecesis Shinyangaënsis) is a diocese located in Shinyanga in the ecclesiastical province of Mwanza in Tanzania.

== History ==
- June 24, 1950: Established as Apostolic Vicariate of Maswa from the Apostolic Vicariate of Musoma-Maswa
- March 25, 1953: Promoted as Diocese of Maswa
- August 9, 1956: Renamed as Diocese of Shinyanga

== Leadership ==
- Bishops of Shinyanga (Roman rite)
  - Bishop Edward Aloysius McGurkin, M.M. (1956.07.04 – 1975.01.30)
  - Bishop Castor Sekwa (1975.01.30 – 1996.06.04)
  - Bishop Aloysius Balina (1997.08.08 - 2012.11.06); died in office
  - Bishop Liberatus Sangu (2015.02.02 - present)

== See also ==
- Roman Catholicism in Tanzania

== Sources ==
- GCatholic.org
- Catholic Hierarchy
