= Matengo Highlands =

Highlands in Mbinga, Ruvuma, Tanzania

Coordinates: 10°34′0″S 34°56′0″E

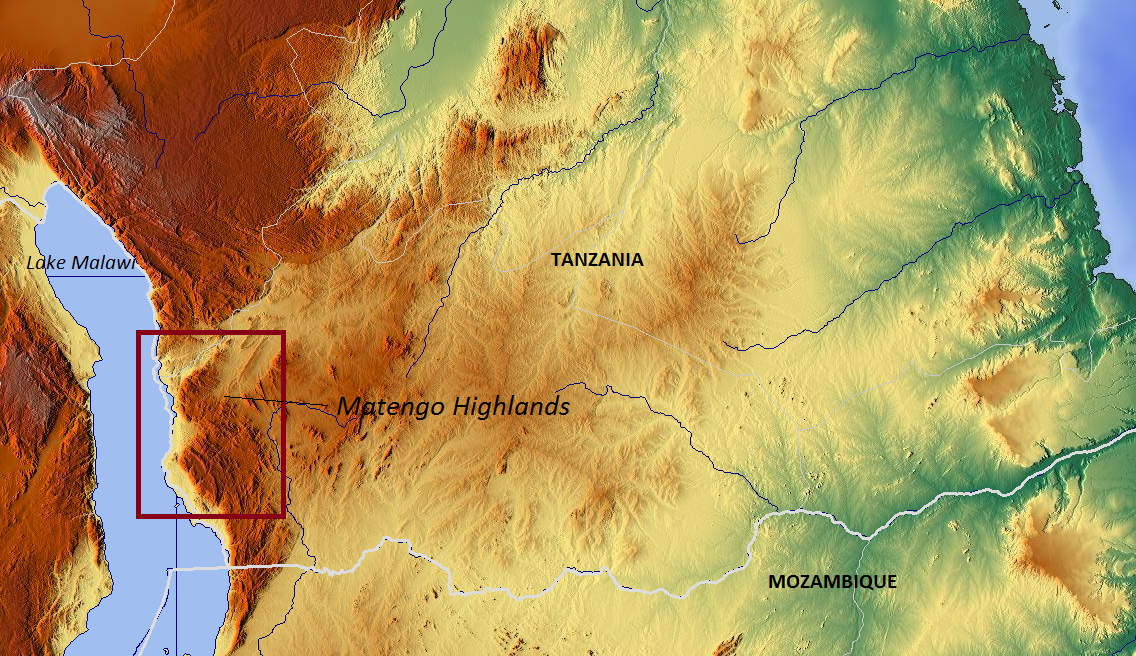
Location

The Matengo Highlands are located in the western part of the mountainous area of Mbinga District, Ruvuma Region in southern Tanzania. They are home to the Matengo people. Kindimba is the historical center of the highlands. It is located on highland's western side, approximately 15 km west of Mbinga. Its subvillages include Kindimba, Kitanda (or Kitunda), Mkanya, Mutugu, Ndembo, Torongi, Walarzi (or Waranzi). In 2006, the total Kindimba population was 2440. Other towns and villages include Litembo and Lipumba.

== Geography ==
Mbinga District covers an area of 11,396 km^{2} (4,400 sq mi), about 18% of the land area of the Ruvuma Region and about 1% of the land mass of Tanzania. The elevation in the highlands ranges from 900 m (3,000 ft) to 2,000 m (6,600 ft) above sea level. There are steep slopes starting at 1,300 m (4,300 ft).

The annual temperature averages 18 °C. The rainy season runs from November through May. Average rainfall is approximately 1000 mm, though it may have ranged from 1500–1700 mm in some years. Mbamba Bay lies at the foot of the highlands.

Along with the Livingstone Mountains, the Matengo Highlands act as catchments of Lake Nyasa.

== Administration ==
The "Socio geographic units" of the Matengo originally consisted of a political organization, which was "non-hierarchical, comprising a collectivity of sovereign matrilineal groups of equivalent status and diverse origins. Each such patrilineal group (kilau) represented the descendants of a common grandfather, who during his lifetime had been the unquestioned leader (matukolu or bambo) of the group." Thus, the socio-political set up in the village consisted of a headman and elders. However, after the Ngonis' invaded Matengo territory, the Matengos' political hierarchy also evolved into an administrative system comprising a paramount chief followed by three chiefs, senior headman and two levels of headman, in the descending order of their importance in the hierarchy. During the colonial administration, this set up was strengthened. However, subsequent to independence of Tanzania in 1961, the patronymic unit (kilau) is retained only for the purpose of naming the family siblings. The present administrative set up in the villages of the Matengo Highland now consists of a "Village Chairman" with a complement of members to administer the village under the control of the local government authorities and the central government.

== Agricultural practice ==
Matengo Highlands (an evergreen montane forest) has a unique system of cultivation known as the "pit cultivation system" also called the "Ngara System" practiced by the local Matengo ethnic group in Mbinga district; other three ethnic groups in the district comprise the Ngoni, the Manda and Nyasa, with the Matengo constituting 60% of the population with a population density of 34 people/km², as of 2000. The pit cultivation practice is a unique farming system on the highlands' steep slopes referred to as ngolo. Under this system of cultivation, the local community has benefited with increased agricultural production. The system has also promoted environmental sustainability. Under this practice, tied ridges are created in the agricultural fields for in-situ composting, which also enables run off retention in the pits between the ridges. The pits are generally about a yard in diameter and a foot deep. Composting is created in the pits by mixing the loosened soil with cut grass, and then plant seeds in the light. These also help in stabilizing the soil in the hill slopes and mixing in grass and old plants enriches it. It is reported that the yield from this practice is generally better than the traditional flat land cultivation practice, and this trend continues over a long period. However, the limiting factors noted in this practice are non availability of labour force to work on the fields and inadequate supply of composting fertilizers. This practice developed since the 18th century has also been acclaimed as an effective soil conservation measure. This cultivation practice usually starts in March following the rainy season. However, specifically in the Matnego Highlands, where the Matengo population density was reported to be 120/km², there was pressure on land use which has resulted in people migrating from the highlands to the woodlands in the northeastern region for cultivation.

== Flora and fauna ==
Elevations lower than 1,400 m (4,600 ft) are characterized by open woodlands of miombo trees, dominated by Caesalpinioideae. The indigenous vegetation is primarily evergreen montane forest.

Coffee was introduced to the highlands in 1926. Coffea arabica from the Kilimanjaro Region was introduced to the region and its cultivation spread to the highlands; and it is the major cash crop in the highlands.

== Bibliography ==
- Kato, Masahiko (July 2001). "Intensive cultivation and environment use among the Matengo in Tanzania". African Study Monographs. 22 (1). africa.kyoto-u.ac.jp: 2.
- Nhira, Calvin; Mapiki, Alfred (2008). Land and Water Management in Southern Africa: Towards Sustainable Agriculture. African Books Collective. pp. 258–73. ISBN 978-0-7983-0214-2.
