= Telesphore Richard Mkude =

Tanzanian Catholic prelate

The Most Reverend Telesphore Richard Mkude
- Bishop Emeritus of Morogoro
- Church: Catholic Church
- Archdiocese: Roman Catholic Archdiocese of Dar es Salaam
- See: Morogoro
- Appointed: 5 April 1993
- Installed: 5 April 1993
- Predecessor: Adriani Mkoba
- Successor: Lazarus Vitalis Msimbe
- Previous post(s): Bishop of Roman Catholic Diocese of Tanga (18 January 1988 until 5 April 1993)

Orders
- Ordination: 16 July 1972
- Consecration: 26 April 1988 by Laurean Cardinal Rugambwa

Personal details
- Born: Telesphore Richard Mkude; 30 November 1945 (age 79); Pinde Village, Diocese of Morogoro, Tanzania

Telesphore Richard Mkude (born 30 November 1945) is a Tanzanian Catholic prelate who is the Bishop Emeritus of the Roman Catholic Diocese of Morogoro, Tanzania. He served there as bishop from 5 April 1993 until his age-related retirement on 30 December 2020. Before he was appointed bishop of Morogoro, he served as Bishop of the Roman Catholic Diocese of Tanga from 18 January 1988 until 5 Apr 1993. He was appointed bishop on 18 January 1988 by Pope John Paul II.

== Early life and education ==
He was born on 30 November 1945 in Pinde Village, Morogoro Region Diocese of Morogoro, in Tanzania.

== Priest ==
He served as priest of Morogoro Diocese from 16 July 1972 until 18 January 1988.

== Bishop ==
On 18 January 1988 Pope John Paul II appointed him Bishop of the Diocese of Tanga, Tanzania. He was consecrated and installed on 26 April 1988, at Saint Antoine Cathedral in Tanga, in the Diocese of Tanga. The Principal Consecrator was Laurean Cardinal Rugambwa, Archbishop of Dar-es-Salaam assisted by Bishop Maurus Gervase Komba, Bishop Emeritus of Tanga and Bishop Adriani Mkoba, Bishop of Morogoro.

On 5 April 1993 the Holy Father appointed him Bishop of the Roman Catholic Diocese of Morogoro. He served there in that capacity until 30 December 2020 when he resigned, having attained the retirement age of 75 years. He stayed on as the Bishop Emeritus of Morogoro Diocese.

As bishop of Morogoro, he laid the foundation stone of Carmel Secondary School Morogoro in Malolo, Tanzania, on 15 October 2004. The school is a Catholic boarding secondary school, grades 8 to 11 (Senior 1 to Senior 4).

== See also ==
- Catholic Church in Tanzania

== Succession table ==
Catholic Church titles
Preceded by Adriani Mkoba (15 December 1966 - 6 November 1992)	Bishop of Morogoro (5 April 1993 - 30 December 2020)	Succeeded by Lazarus Vitalis Msimbe (31 May 2021 - present)
Preceded by Maurus Gervase Komba (15 December 1969 - 18 January 1988)	Bishop of Tanga (18 January 1988 - 5 April 1993)	Succeeded by Anthony Mathias Banzi (10 June 1994 - 20 December 2020)
