= Roman Catholic Diocese of Bunda =

Roman Catholic diocese in Tanzania, Africa

Coordinates: 2.0204°S 33.8789°E

Diocese of Bunda Dioecesis Bundana

Location
- Country: Tanzania
- Metropolitan: Mwanza

Statistics
- Area: 5,330 km^{2} (2,060 sq mi)
- Population: Total; Catholics: (as of 2004); 1,023,397; 335,000 (32.7%)

Information
- Rite: Latin Rite

Current leadership
- Pope: Leo XIV
- Bishop: Simon Chibuga Masondole

The Roman Catholic Diocese of Bunda (Latin: Dioecesis Bundana) is a diocese located in Bunda Town in the ecclesiastical province of Mwanza in Tanzania.

== History ==
- November 27, 2010: Established as Diocese of Bunda from the Archdiocese of Mwanza and the Diocese of Musoma.

== Territory ==
The diocese comprises the districts of Bunda and Ukerewe and two parishes from the district of Musoma.

== Cathedral ==
The Parish church of St. Paul's in Bunda is the cathedral church of the diocese.

== Leadership ==
- Bishop Renatus Leonard Nkwande (2010.11.27 – 2019.02.11), appointed Archbishop of Mwanza
- Bishop Simon Chibuga Masondole (2021.04.06 – ...)

== See also ==
- Roman Catholicism in Tanzania

== Sources ==
- GCatholic.org
- Catholic Hierarchy
