= Matengo language =

Bantu language spoken in Tanzania

Matengo
- Chimatengo
- Native to: Tanzania
- Ethnicity: Matengo people
- Native speakers: (150,000 cited 1987)
- Language family: Niger–Congo?: Atlantic–Congo; Benue–Congo; Bantoid; Bantu; Rufiji–Ruvuma; Mbinga; Ruhuhu (South); Matengo

Language codes
- ISO 639-3: mgv
- Glottolog: mate1258
- Guthrie code: N.13
- Linguasphere: 99-AUS-rc

Matengo is a Bantu language of Tanzania. Speakers are mostly monolingual, and neighboring languages are not intelligible.

Matengo language is relatively related to Ngoni language in that the two have similar history of origin.

== Phonology ==
The phonological inventry in Matengo contains 24 consonants and 7 vowels.

=== Vowels ===
Matengo has a seven-vowel system, and each vowel has a phonemic length contrast.

Vowel inventry of Matengo
| | Front | Central | Back |
|---|---|---|---|
| Close | /i/ | | /u/ |
| Close mid | /e/ | | /o/ |
| Open mid | /ɛ/ | | /ɔ/ |
| Open | | /a/ | |

=== Consonants ===
Consonant inventry of Matengo
| | | Labial | Alveolar | Palatal | Velar | Glottal |
|---|---|---|---|---|---|---|
| Plosive | voiceless | /p/ [p] | /t/ [t] | | /k/ [k] | |
| Plosive | voiced | /b/ [b~ɓ] | | | /g/ [g~ɣ] | |
| Fricative | | | /s/ [s] | | | /h/ [h] |
| Affriactive | | | /dʒ/ [dʒ~dz] | | | |
| Nasal | | /m/ [m] | /n/ [n] | /ɲ/ [ɲ] | /ŋ/ [ŋ] | |
| Liquid | | | /l/ [l~d] | | | |
| Approximant | | /w/ [w~u] | | /j/ [j~i] | | |
