= Diocese of Kayanga =

Roman Catholic diocese in Tanzania, Africa

Coordinates: 1.5830°S 31.1336°E

Diocese of Kayanga Dioecesis Kayangana

Location
- Country: Tanzania
- Metropolitan: Mwanza

Statistics
- Population: Total; Catholics: (as of 2002); 675,476; 450,000

Information
- Rite: Latin Rite
- Cathedral: St. George, Karagwe

Current leadership
- Bishop: Almachius Vincent Rweyongeza

The Roman Catholic Diocese of Kayanga (Latin: Dioecesis Kayangana) is a diocese located in the city of Kayanga in the ecclesiastical province of Mwanza in Tanzania. It was established August 14, 2008 from territory previously in the Diocese of Rulenge.

The diocese maintains 11 parishes, two schools, two hospitals and a health clinic. In addition to parish and administrative priests, three different communities of women religious minister in the diocese: the Religious Congregation of the Apostles of Unlimited Love Sisters (Masista Mitume wa Upendo Upeo), the Franciscan Sisters of St. Bernadette, and the Sisters of St. Therese of the Child Jesus.

== Leadership ==
- Bishops of Kayanga (Roman rite)
  - Bishop Almachius Vincent Rweyongeza (14 August 2008 – present)
