= Diocese of Ifakara =

Roman Catholic diocese in Tanzania, Africa

Coordinates: 8.1422°S 36.6804°E

Diocese of Diocese of Ifakara Dioecesis Ifakarensis

Location
- Country: Tanzania
- Territory: Kilombero District
- Ecclesiastical province: Roman Catholic Archdiocese of Dar-es-Salaam

Statistics
- Area: 14,245 km^{2} (5,500 sq mi)
- Population: Total; Catholics: (as of 2012); 322,779; 287,000 (88.9%)

Information
- Rite: Roman Rite
- Established: January 14, 2012
- Cathedral: Saint Andrew's cathedral

Current leadership
- Pope: Leo XIV
- Bishop: Salutaris Melchior Libena

The diocese of Ifakara (in Latin: Dioecesis Ifakarensis) is a see of the Roman Catholic Church suffragan of the Roman Catholic Archdiocese of Dar-es-Salaam. In 2012, it counted 287,000 baptized people among a population of 322,779 inhabitants. Its current bishop is Salutaris Melchior Libena.

== Territory ==
The diocese corresponds to the Kilombero District in the Morogoro Region in Tanzania.

Its see is located in the city of Ifakara, where the cathedral of Saint Patrick stands.

The territory is divided into 18 parishes.

== History ==
The diocese was created on January 14, 2012, by the Papal bull Nuper est petitum of Pope Benedict XVI, taking territories from the Roman Catholic Diocese of Mahenge.

== Chronology of the bishops ==
- Salutaris Melchior Libena, since January 14, 2012

== Statistics ==
At the date of its creation, the Diocese had a population of 322,779 people among whom 287,800 were baptized, which is 88.9%.

Year	Population			Priests				Deacons	Religious		Parishes
	baptised	total	%	number	secular	regular	baptised per priest		men	women
2012	287.800	322.779	88,9	62	42	20	4.629		3	198	18
