= Diocese of Mtwara =

Roman Catholic diocese in Tanzania, Africa

Coordinates: 10.273611°S 40.182778°E

Diocese of Mtwara Dioecesis Mtuarana

Location
- Country: Tanzania
- Metropolitan: Songea

Statistics
- Area: 7,780 km^{2} (3,000 sq mi)
- Population: Total; Catholics: (as of 2004); 689,164; 62,273 (9.0%)

Information
- Rite: Latin Rite

Current leadership
- Pope: Leo XIV
- Bishop: Titus Joseph Mdoe

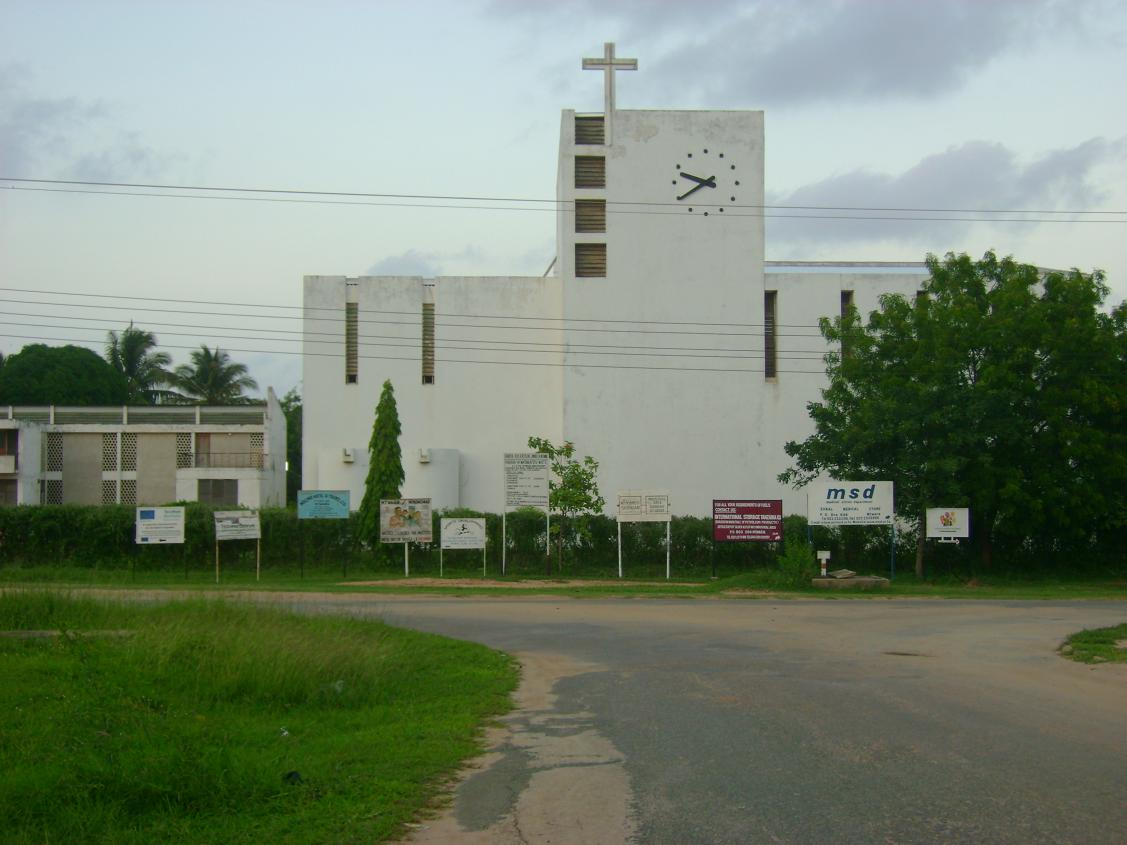

The Roman Catholic Diocese of Mtwara (Latin: Dioecesis Mtuarana) is a diocese located in Mtwara in the ecclesiastical province of Songea in Tanzania.

== History ==
- December 22, 1931: Established as Territorial Abbacy of Mtwara from the Roman Catholic Diocese of Lindi
- December 18, 1972: Promoted as Diocese of Mtwara

== Bishops ==
=== Ordinaries ===
- Territorial Abbots of Mtwara (Roman rite)
  - Bishop Joachim Ammann, O.S.B. (1932.05.29 – 1948.12.15)
  - Bishop Anthony Victor Hälg, O.S.B. (1949.12.15 – 1972)
- Bishops of Mtwara (Roman rite)
  - Bishop Maurus Libaba (1972.12.18 – 1986.10.17), appointed Bishop of Lindi
  - Bishop Gabriel Mmole (1988.03.12 - 2015.10.15)
  - Bishop Titus Joseph Mdoe (since 2015.10.15)

=== Coadjutor Bishop ===
- Anthony Victor Haelg (Hälg), O.S.B. (1949)

== See also ==
- Roman Catholicism in Tanzania

== Sources ==
- Catholic Hierarchy
