= Diocese of Mahenge =

Roman Catholic diocese in Tanzania, Africa

Coordinates: 9°S 36.666667°E

Diocese of Mahenge Dioecesis Mahengensis

Location
- Country: Tanzania
- Metropolitan: Dar-es-Salaam

Statistics
- Area: 39,498 km^{2} (15,250 sq mi)
- Population: Total; Catholics: (as of 2004); 531,237; 465,696 (87.7%)

Information
- Rite: Latin Rite

Current leadership
- Pope: Leo XIV
- Bishop: Agapiti Ndorobo

The Roman Catholic Diocese of Mahenge (Latin: Dioecesis Mahengensis) is a diocese located in the city of Mahenge in the ecclesiastical province of Dar-es-Salaam in Tanzania.

== History ==
- April 21, 1964: Established as Diocese of Mahenge from Metropolitan Archdiocese of Dar-es-Salaam

== Bishops ==
- Bishops of Mahenge (Roman rite)
  - Bishop Elias Mchonde (1964.04.21 – 1969.06.13)
  - Bishop Nikasius Kipengele (1970.06.25 – 1971.12.07)
  - Bishop Patrick Iteka (1973.06.14 – 1993.08.22)
  - Bishop Agapiti Ndorobo (since 1995.03.03)

=== Other priests of this diocese who became bishops ===
- Salutaris Melchior Libena, appointed auxiliary bishop of Dar-es-Salaam in 2010
- Filbert Felician Mhasi, appointed Bishop of Tunduru-Masasi in 2018

== See also ==
- Roman Catholicism in Tanzania

== Sources ==
- GCatholic.org
- Catholic Hierarchy
