= Renatus Lwamosa Butibubage =

Tanzanian Catholic prelate (1918 - 1998)

The Most Reverend Renatus Lwamosa Butibubage
- Bishop Emeritus of Mwanza, Tanzania (Deceased)
- Church: Catholic Church
- Archdiocese: Roman Catholic Archdiocese of Tabora
- See: Mwanza
- Appointed: 18 December 1965
- Installed: 18 December 1965
- Term ended: 18 November 1987
- Predecessor: Joseph Blomjous
- Successor: Anthony Peter Mayalla
- Other post(s): Auxiliary Bishop of the Roman Catholic Diocese of Mwanza (19 December 1959 - 18 December 1965)

Orders
- Ordination: 22 August 1948
- Consecration: 8 May 1960 by Pope John XXIII
- Rank: Bishop

Personal details
- Born: Renatus Lwamosa Butibubage; April 3, 1918; Mwanza, Diocese of Mwanza, Mwanza Region, Tanzania
- Died: 2 October 1998 (aged 80)

Styles of Renatus Lwamosa Butibubage
- Reference style: Your Lordship; The Most Reverend
- Spoken style: His Lordship
- Religious style: Bishop

Renatus Lwamosa Butibubage (3 April 1918 - 2 October 1998) was a Tanzanian Catholic prelate who served as the Bishop of the Roman Catholic Diocese of Mwanza. He was appointed bishop of Mwanza on 18 December 1965 by Pope Paul VI. He previously served as Auxiliary Bishop of the Diocese of Mwanza between 1959 and 1965. He was appointed bishop on 19 December 1959 by Pope John XXIII. He died on 2 October 1998 as Bishop Emeritus of Mwanza, Tanzania at the age of 80 years.

== Background and education ==
He was born on 3 April 1918, at Mwanza, Diocese of Mwanza, Mwanza Region, Tanzania. After attending studies in philosophy and Theology, he was ordained a priest on 22 August 1948.

== Priesthood ==
On 22 August 1948, he was ordained a priest. He served in that capacity until 19 December 1959.

== As bishop ==
On 19 December 1959, Pope John XXIII appointed him as Auxiliary Bishop of the Roman Catholic Diocese of Mwanza. He was concurrently appointed Titular Bishop of Casius. He was consecrated at Rome, Italy on 8 May 1960 by the hands of Pope John XXIII, assisted by Bishop Napoléon-Alexandre Labrie, Titular Bishop of Hilta and Bishop Fulton John Sheen, Titular Bishop of Caesariana.

On 18 December 1965, Pope Paul VI appointed him Bishop of the Diocese of Mwanza. He succeeded Bishop Joseph Blomjous, who resigned on 15 October 1965. He resigned as bishop of Mwanza on 18 November 1987. He died on 2 October 1998 as Bishop Emeritus of Mwanza, Tanzania at the age of 80 years.

He is reported to have attended the Second Vatican Council: Session One and the Second Vatican Council: Session Four.

== See also ==
- Catholic Church in Tanzania

== Succession table ==
Catholic Church titles
Preceded by	Auxiliary Bishop of Mwanza (19 December 1959 - 18 December 1965)	Succeeded by
Preceded by Joseph Blomjous (24 June 1950 - 15 October 1965)	Bishop of Mwanza (18 December 1965 - 18 November 1987)	Succeeded by Anthony Peter Mayalla
