= Edward Aloysius McGurkin =

Catholic bishop (1905–1983)

The Most Reverend Edward A. McGurkin, M.M.
- Bishop of Shinyanga
- Church: Catholic Church
- Appointed: July 4, 1956
- In office: October 3, 1956 - January 30, 1975

Orders
- Ordination: September 14, 1930 by John Dunne
- Consecration: October 3, 1956 by Henry Joseph O'Brien

Personal details
- Born: June 22, 1905 Hartford, Connecticut
- Died: August 28, 1983 (aged 78) Ossining, New York
- Motto: Primum Regnum Dei

Edward Aloysius McGurkin, M.M. (June 22, 1905 – August 28, 1983) was an American-born Catholic missionary and bishop. As a member of the Catholic Foreign Mission Society of America (Maryknoll), he was assigned to missions in Manchuria and Tanzania. He served as the Bishop of Shinyanga from 1956-1975.

== Early life and education ==
Edward McGurkin was born in Hartford, Connecticut, to Michael and Katherine (Gleason) McGurkin. He was educated in the Hartford public schools before enrolling at St. Thomas Preparatory Seminary. He was ordained a priest on September 14, 1930.

== Priesthood ==
After his ordination McGurkin served as the English Editor of the Fides News Service and personal secretary to Cardinal Pietro Fumasoni Biondi, the Prefect of the Sacred Congregation of the Evangelization of Peoples. In 1935 he became the Procurator General. He was assigned as a missionary in Fushun, Manchuria in 1938. During World War II he was interned by the Japanese. He returned to the United States in 1946 and became a spiritual director at Maryknoll and two years later the local superior. He went to Bedford, Massachusetts, as novice master before being sent to Shinyanga, Tanzania in 1954 as Group Superior to Maryknoll’s new mission there. On July 4, 1956 Pope Pius XII appointed McGurkin as the first bishop of Shinyanga.

== Episcopacy ==
Edward McGurkin was consecrated a bishop on October 3, 1956, in the Cathedral of St. Joseph in Hartford, Connecticut, by Archbishop Henry O'Brien. The principal co-consecrators were Bishops Frederick Donaghy, M.M. of Wuchow and Lawrence Shehan of Bridgeport. McGurkin attended all four sessions of the Second Vatican Council. He served as the diocesan bishop until his resignation was accepted by Pope Paul VI on January 30, 1975.

== Later life and death ==
Bishop McGurkin retired to Maryknoll where he was engaged as a spiritual director with Cursillo and involved with Charismatic renewal and other pastoral work. He died on August 28, 1983, at the age of 78. His funeral Mass was celebrated in the Queen of Apostles Chapel on August 31, 1983, by Bishop John Comber, M.M. He was buried in the Maryknoll Center Cemetery.
