= Anthony Banzi =

Tanzanian bishop (1946–2020)

Anthony Mathias Banzi
- Bishop of Tanga
- Church: Catholic Church
- Diocese: Diocese of Tanga
- In office: 10 June 1994 – 20 December 2020
- Predecessor: Telesphore Richard Mkude
- Successor: Thomas John Kiangio

Orders
- Ordination: 29 July 1973
- Consecration: 15 September 1994 by Polycarp Pengo

Personal details
- Born: 28 October 1946 Mangoja (in/near present-day Tawa Ward), Eastern Region, Mandatory Tanganyika Territory, British Empire
- Died: 20 December 2020 (aged 74) Dar es Salaam, Tanzania

Anthony Mathias Banzi (28 October 1946 – 20 December 2020) was a Tanzanian Roman Catholic bishop.

Bishop Anthony Banzi was born in a village known as Mangoja, Tawa Parish in the Diocese of Morogoro. His parents were Mzee Mathias B. Mtigumwe Mwenyembegu and Mama Selestina Mlachiluwa P. Mdime.

He was baptised on 10 November 1946 and was given the names Anthony Simon.

He received the sacrament of communion on 23 June 1957 and the sacrament of confirmation on 10 September 1957.

He received his primary education at Lukenge primary school from 1956 to 1959. He joined St. Peter Minor seminary (Bagamoyo) in 1960 and from 1965 to 1966 continued with his studies at St. Charles minor Seminary - Itaga - Tabora. From 1968 to 1969 he continued with his studies at Kibosho major Seminary (Moshi) studying philosophy and later at Kipalapala studying theology from 1970 to 1973. He was ordained to the priesthood on 29 July 1973.

After being ordained as a priest he served as an assistant parish priest at Mlaki, Msongozi, Mtombozi and Matombo parishes. He also served as a parish priest at Muskati parish and Turiani in the Mvomero district, also in 1976 he served as an accountant at Ntungamo major Seminary in Bukoba, in the same year he was sent to Innsbruck (Austria) for further studies. In 1981 he got a doctoral degree in philosophy, in 1981 to 1982 he served as a priest for the sick at Turiani hospital, later he served as a parish priest at Mandera parish in the diocese of Morogoro, also from 1982 to 1985 he was the chief accountant of the diocese of Morogoro. From 1985 to 1987 he was a spiritual guardian (director) Bigwa secondary in Morogoro. From 1988 to 1991 he was the vice rector at the Ntungamo major Seminary (Bukoba).

In 1992 he was appointedrector at Kibosho major Seminary (Moshi) he served at the major Seminary until he was appointed by John Paul II to be the fourth Bishop of Tanga diocese on 24 June 1994 following his consecration on 15 September 1994.

In his lifetime as the Shepherd of the diocese he lived with his three mottos which are "Wisdom, Unity and Peace".

On 15 September 2019 he celebrated his 25 years of being a bishop. After battling throat cancer, he died on 20 December 2020.

"ETERNAL REST GRANT UNTO HIM O LORD AND LET THE PERPETUAL LIGHT SHINE UPON HIM, MAY HE REST IN PEACE AMEN"

IBADA NA MISA YA MAZISHI DISEMBA 28 - 29, 2020 HAYATI BABA ASKOFU ANTHONY .M. BANZI 1946 - 2020.
