= Aloysius Balina =

Roman Catholic bishop (1945–2012)

- Bishop of Shinyanga
- In office: 17 November 1997 – 6 November 2012
- Successor: Liberatus Sangu
- Other post(s): Bishop of Geita (1985–97)

Orders
- Ordination: 27 June 1971
- Consecration: 6 January 1985 by Pope John Paul II

Personal details
- Born: 21 June 1945; Isoso, Bariadi, Tanzania
- Died: 6 November 2012 (aged 67); Mwanza, Tanzania

Aloysius Balina (21 January 1945 – 6 November 2012) was bishop of the Roman Catholic Diocese of Shinyanga, Tanzania.

Born in Isoso and ordained to the priesthood on 21 June 1971, Balina was appointed by Pope John Paul II as Bishop of Geita in 1984; he was consecrated by John Paul II on 6 January 1985. In 1997, he was appointed Bishop of Shinyanga; he was installed on 17 November the same year.

Balina died on 6 November 2012 in Mwanza, Tanzania.
