= Itete =

Ward in Busokelo, Mbeya, Tanzania

Itete Kata ya Itete
- Ward
- Location within Tanzania
- Coordinates: 9.112°S 33.489°E
- Country: Tanzania
- Region: Mbeya Region
- District: Busokelo District
- Ward: Itete

Population (2016)
  - Total: 4,939
- Time zone: UTC+3 (EAT)
- Postcode: 53527

Itete is an administrative ward in the Busokelo District of the Mbeya Region of Tanzania. In 2016 the Tanzania National Bureau of Statistics report there were 4,939 people in the ward, from 9,869 in 2012.

== Villages / vitongoji ==
The ward has 5 villages and 29 vitongoji.

- Kabembe
  - Ikama
  - Kitima
  - Lwambi
  - Mpanda
  - Mpuguso
- Selya
  - Bujesi
  - Busekele
  - Mbusania
  - Ngana
- Busoka
  - Butola
  - Hedikota
  - Juakali
  - Kandete
  - Katilu
  - Mbegele
  - Mbonja
  - Mpanda
  - Saru
- Kilugu
  - Ipyana
  - Lukwego
  - Lupaso
  - Lusungo
  - Mpanda
  - Ngamanga
- Kibole
  - Ilopa
  - Ipyasyo
  - Kibole Kati
  - Nguti
  - Nkuyu
