= Bukumbi =

- Village
- Location within Tanzania
- Coordinates: 2.714431°S 32.92124°E
- Country: Tanzania
- Region: Mwanza

Bukumbi is a village on the southern shore of Lake Victoria in Tanzania, situated in the Mwanza Region.

In 1883, the White Fathers, a group of missionaries led by Léon Livinhac, established a Catholic mission called Kamoga at Bukumbi. The location was chosen as being less disturbed by Buganda, located to the north of the lake. In the late 1880s, it was the location of the Catholic seminary headed by John Joseph Hirth.
