= Titus Joseph Mdoe =

Tanzanian Catholic prelate

The Most Reverend Titus Joseph Mdoe
- Bishop of Mtwara
- Church: Catholic Church
- Archdiocese: Songea
- See: Mtwara
- Appointed: 15 October 2015
- Installed: 15 October 2015
- Predecessor: Gabriel Mmole
- Other post: Vice-Chancellor of Stella Maris Mtwara University College (2010 - 2013)
- Previous post: Auxiliary Bishop Archdiocese of Dar es Salaam (16 February 2013 until 15 October 2015)

Orders
- Ordination: 24 June 1986
- Consecration: 1 May 2013 by Polycarp Cardinal Pengo

Personal details
- Born: Titus Joseph Mdoe; 19 March 1961 (age 64) Lushoto, Lushoto District, Tanga Region, Diocese of Tanga, Tanzania

Titus Joseph Mdoe (born 19 March 1961) is a Tanzanian prelate of the Catholic Church who is the Bishop of the Roman Catholic Diocese of Mtwara, Tanzania. Before he was posted to Mtwara, he served as Auxiliary Bishop of the Archdiocese of Dar es Salaam, from 16 February 2013 until 15 October 2015. He was appointed bishop on 16 February 2013 by Pope Benedict XVI.

== Early life and education ==
He was born on 19 March 1961 in Lushoto, Diocese of Tanga, Tanga District, Tanga Region in Tanzania.

He attended primary school in Kongei, Tanga Region. He then transferred to St. Peter's Minor Seminary, in the Catholic Diocese of Morogoro for his secondary school studies. He studied Philosophy at Kibosho Major Seminary, in the Catholic Diocese of Moshi. He then entered the Segerea Major Seminary, in the Archdiocese of Dar es Salaam, where he studied Theology. From 2008 until 2010 he studied at Santa Clara University in Santa Clara, California, United States, where he graduated with a Master's degree in spiritual life and pastoral activities.

== Priest ==
He was ordained priest of the Diocese of Tanga, Tanzania on 24 June 1986.

While a priest, he served in various roles including as:

- Assistant parish priest of Gare Parish
- Director of Vocations in the Catholic Diocese of Tanga
- Assistant pastor at St. Anthony's Cathedral, Tanga
- Parish priest of Hale Parish from 1995 until 2000
- Parish priest of St. Theresa's Cathedral, from 2000 until 2008
- Vice-chancellor of Stella Maris Mtwara University College from 2010 until 2013.

== Bishop ==
On 16 February 2013 Pope Benedict XVI appointed Monsignor Titus Joseph Mdoe as auxiliary bishop of the diocese of Dar es Salaam. He was concurrently appointed Titular Bishop of Bahanna. He was consecrated and installed on 1 May 2013 at the hands of Polycarp Cardinal Pengo, Archbishop of Dar es Salaam assisted by Bishop Tarcisius Ngalalekumtwa, Bishop of Iringa and Anthony Mathias Banzi, Bishop of Tanga.

Pope Francis, accepted the age-related resignation of Bishop Gabriel Mmole of the diocese of Mtwara, Tanzania, on 15 October 2015. The Holy Father appointed Bishop Titus Joseph Mdoe, Auxiliary Bishop of the Archdiocese of Dar es Salaam and Titular Bishop of Bahanna as the new Bishop of the Diocese of Mtwara effective the same day.

As bishop in his diocese he urges his clergy especially newly ordained priests to have courage, exercise patience, make friends and prioritize God in everything that they do.

== See also ==
- Catholic Church in Tanzania

== Succession table ==
Catholic Church titles
Preceded by Gabriel Mmole (12 March 1988 - 15 October 2015)	Bishop of Mtwara; Since (15 October 2015)	Succeeded by Incumbent
