= Litembo =

- Village
- Location in Tanzania
- Coordinates: 10°58′S 34°51′E
- Country: Tanzania
- Region: Ruvuma Region
- District: Mbinga
- Elevation: 1,426 m (4,678 ft)

Population (2012)
  - Total: 3,325
- Time zone: UTC+3 (EAT)

Litembo is a village in Mbinga district in the Ruvuma Region of the Tanzanian Southern Highlands. It is located in the Matengo Highlands and is inhabited by the Matengo people. Litembo is located to the southwest of the town of Mbinga. It contains the Litembo Diocesan Hospital.

== History ==
The Matengo people were forced into the mountainous areas around Litembo by the Ngoni people and many moved into caves.

== Agriculture ==
The traditional farming methods of the villagers are known as Ingolo or Ngolo. Over the last 100 years, the Matengo have developed an innovative method of farming on the steep hills, digging pits on ridges on steep slopes to prevent soil erosion and to promote sustainable fertile soils. The function of the pits is to prevent heavy rain from washing away the soils on the steep slopes, acting as sedimentation tanks to trap green grasses, thus providing a source of nutrients for the following season. The main crops they grow are staple food crops and coffee under this unique system of cultivation known as "Matengo Pit Cultivation". This cultivation practice usually starts in March following the rainy season. Their method involves a 2-year one-cycle rotation of crops, with a short-fallow period, generally maize, beans, and peas. For example, with maize farming amongst the Matengo, in November a farmer will make furrows of roughly 5 centimetres on the ridges and sow the seeds, and commence weeding in December. The maize is then harvested in July and then the field is reduced to fallow until the following March to allow the soils to recover. If the planting of beans is delayed, cassava is often planted in April or May. Often, the fields may only contain cassava which is known to the Matengo as "kibagu" and is generally grown for 2–3 years. Like sweet potatoes, cassava is often grown to increase food supply during bad harvests. It is common for fields to contain a mix of maize and beans and to a lesser extent cassava. Unlike maize, the beans are harvested earlier in the season in the March. Some are also known to cultivate onions, cabbage, Chinese cabbage and tomato.

== Bibliography ==
- Kurosaki, Ryugo (March 2007), "Multiple uses of small-scale valley bottom land: case study of the Matengo in southern Tanzania", African Study Monographs, Suppl. 36, 19-38
- Nhira, Calvin; Mapiki, Alfred (2008). Land and Water Management in Southern Africa: Towards Sustainable Agriculture. African Books Collective. pp. 258–73. ISBN 978-0-7983-0214-2.
