= Nestorius Timanywa =

Tanzanian Roman Catholic bishop (1937–2018)

The Most Reverend Nestorius Timanywa
- Bishop Emeritus of Bukoba (Deceased)
- Church: Roman Catholic
- Archdiocese: Roman Catholic Archdiocese of Mwanza
- Metropolis: Mwanza
- See: Bukoba
- Appointed: 26 November 1963
- Installed: 24 February 1974
- Retired: 15 January 2013
- Term ended: 15 January 2013
- Predecessor: Placidus Gervasius Nkalanga
- Successor: Desiderius M. Rwoma

Orders
- Ordination: 11 December 1966 by Laurean Cardinal Rugambwa
- Consecration: 24 February 1974 by Laurean Cardinal Rugambwa

Personal details
- Born: Nestorius Timanywa; 7 May 1937 Kakungiri, Missenyi District, Kagera Region, Tanzania
- Died: August 28, 2018 (aged 81) Bugando Medical Centre, Mwanza, in Mwanza Region, Tanzania
- Denomination: Catholicism

Styles of Nestorius Timanywa
- Reference style: The Most Reverend
- Spoken style: Your Grace
- Religious style: Bishop

Ordination history of Nestorius Timanywa
History
Priestly ordination
- Ordained by: Laurean Cardinal Rugambwa
Episcopal consecration
- Principal consecrator: Laurean Cardinal Rugambwa
- Co-consecrators: Marko Mihayo; Christopher Mwoleka

Nestorius Timanywa (7 May 1937 - 28 August 2018) was a Tanzanian Roman Catholic bishop. He served as the bishop of the Roman Catholic Diocese of Bukoba, Tanzania, from 1974 until 2013 when he retired, having attained the retirement age of 75 years. He was appointed bishop in 1973 by Pope Paul VI. He died in August 2018 at the age of 81 years.

== Background and education ==
He was born in Kakungiri Village, in Bukoba Diocese, Kagera Region. He attended Tanzanian seminaries, where he qualified to be ordained as a priest in 1966.

== Priest ==
He was ordained a priest of Bukoba Diocese, Tanzania, on 11 December 1966, by Laurean Cardinal Rugambwa, Bishop of Bukoba. He served in that capacity until 26 November 1973.

== Bishop ==
On 26 November 1973 Pope Paul VI appointed Monsignor Nestorius Timanywa as the Bishop of Bukoba. He was consecrated and installed at the Mater Misericordiae Cathedral, in Bukoba, Diocese of Bukoba. The Principal Consecrator was Laurean Cardinal Rugambwa, Archbishop of Dar-es-Salaam assisted by Archbishop Marko Mihayo, Archbishop of Tabora and Bishop Christopher Mwoleka, Bishop of Rulenge.

On 15 Jan 2013 Pope Benedict XVI accepted the age-related retirement request of Bishop Nestorius Timanywa from the pastoral responsibilities of the diocese of Bukoba in Tanzania. The Holy Father appointed Desiderius M. Rwoma as Bishop of Bukoba, Tanzania, transferring him from the Diocese of Singida.

== Death ==
His Excellency Monsignor Nestorius Timanywa, Bishop Emeritus of Bukoba, Tanzania died on 28 August 2018 at Bugando Medical Centre, in Mwanza, Tanzania.

== See also ==
- Catholic Church in Tanzania

== Succession table ==
Catholic Church titles
Preceded by Placidus Gervasius Nkalanga (1969–1973)	Bishop of Bukoba; 26 November 1973 - 15 January 2013	Succeeded by Desiderius M. Rwoma
