= Matengo people =

Ethnic group from Ruvuma Region of Tanzania

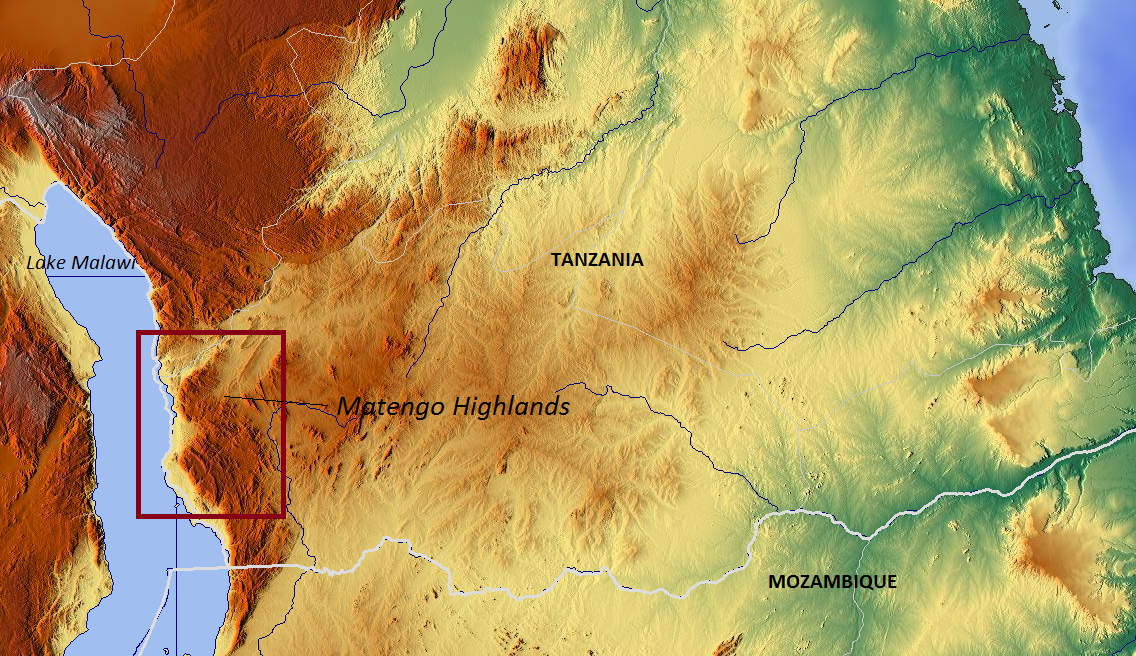
Map showing the approximate location of the Matengo Highlands in Tanzania

The Matengo are an ethnic and linguistic group based in Mbinga District, Ruvuma Region in southern Tanzania. In 1957, the population estimate was 57,000, while in 2010, the Matengo population was estimated to number 284,000. Their religious affiliation is to Christianity. Their main language is Matengo, which is one of the Bantu languages.

== History ==
The Matengo people are believed to have lived in the Matengo Highlands since the Iron Age.

The area in which they live was invaded by the Maseko Ngoni people of the Dedza district of Malawi prior to 1750. This forced the Matengo people further into the mountainous areas around Litembo where many moved into caves. Many people moved in the northeastern part of the district into the woodland. During the pressure from the Ngoni people, the Matengo developed a hierarchy of power amongst their peoples, with a senior chief in charge of three local chiefs. This system was strong during the colonial period until shortly before independence in 1961. In the late 1960s, a dramatic population increase amongst the Matengo peoples of the region led to food shortages, which had a direct impact upon the distribution of the people, with many moving to the eastern part of the district and forming new villages to farm the land seasonally.

== Demographics ==
Mbinga district comprises four ethnic groups namely the Matengo, the Ngoni, the Manda and Nyasa and the Matengo constitute 60% of the population with a population density of 34 people/km^{2}, as of 2000. Specifically, in the Matengo Highlands the Matengo population density was reported to be 120/km^{2}. As a result, there is pressure on land use, which has resulted in people migrating from the highlands to the woodlands in the northeastern region.

== Socio-political setup ==
The "Socio geographic units" of the Matengo originally consisted of a political organization which was "non-hierarchical, comprising a collectivity of sovereign matrilineal groups of equivalent status and diverse origins. Each such patrilineal group (kilau) represented the descendants of a common grandfather, who during his lifetime had been the unquestioned leader (matukolu or bambo) of the group." Thus, the socio-political set up in the villages consisted of a headman and elders. However, after the Ngonis' invaded their territory, the Matengos' political hierarchy also evolved into an administrative system comprising a paramount chief followed by three chiefs, senior headman and two levels of headman, in the descending order of their importance in the hierarchy. During the colonial administration, this set up was strengthened. However, subsequent to independence of Tanzania in 1961, the patronymic unit (kilau) is retained only for the purpose of naming the family siblings. The present administrative set up in the village consists of a "Village Chairman" with a complement of members to administer the village under the control of the local government authorities and the central government.

== Language ==
Matengo is a "middle sized language", an offshoot of the Bantu language that is commonly spoken in the southwestern corner of Tanzania. Bantu speakers are also known as "people of the woods" (a derivative from the word ‘kitengo’ meaning "dense forest"). However, the Swahili words have influenced the Matengo, particularly the lexicon. Grammar and phonology of Matengo have undergone change under Swahili influence; a certain amount of code mixing has also occurred. The Matengo language is thus getting Swahilized gradually, and as result most of the younger generation tend to speak in Swahili.

== Climate and agriculture ==
The Matengo people inhabit the southern highlands of Tanzania, a mountainous area of the country which ranges in altitude from 900 to 2000 metres above sea level. The land below an altitude of 1400 metres is generally open woodland known as miombo, with a heavy concentration of Caesalpiniaceae trees. The climate is typically cool, averaging a temperature of 18 °C annually and is relatively wet, with an average annual rainfall of about 1000 mm.

The traditional farming methods of the Matengo are known as Ingolo or Ngolo. Over the last 100 years, the Matengo have developed an innovative method of farming on the steep hills, digging pits on ridges on steep slopes to prevent soil erosion and to promote sustainable fertile soils. The function of the pits is to prevent heavy rain washing away the soils on the steep slopes, acting as sedimentation tanks to trap green grasses, thus providing a source of nutrients for the following season. The main crops they grow are staple food crops and coffee under this unique system of cultivation known as "Matengo Pit Cultivation". This cultivation practice usually starts in March following the rainy season. Their method involves a 2-year one-cycle rotation of crops, with a short-fallow period, generally maize, beans and peas. For example, with maize farming amongst the Matengo, in November a farmer will make furrows of roughly 5 centimetres on the ridges and sow the seeds, and commence weeding in December. The maize is then harvested in July and then the field is reduced to fallow until the following March to allow the soils to recover. If the planting of beans is delayed, cassava is often planted in the April or May. Often, the fields may only contain cassava which is known to the Matengo as "kibagu" and is generally grown for 2–3 years. Like sweet potato, cassava is often grown to increase food supply during bad harvests. It is common for fields to contain a mix of maize and beans and to a lesser extent cassava. Unlike maize, the beans are harvested earlier in the season in the March. Some are also known to cultivate onions, cabbage, Chinese cabbage and tomato.

While practicing a sedentary agriculture style in the country's mountainous region, the Matengo also cultivate the cash crop of coffee. It was introduced to Mbinga District in the 1920s by the son of ex-Paramount chief Yohani Chrisostomus Makita Kayuni to enable the Matengo to pay poll tax, a demand of the colonial administration. Since then, the district has developed coffee sustainability due to its cold and wet climatic conditions, which has resulted in the district becoming a major coffee-producing region in Tanzania. This has also improved the economic condition of the people with some families becoming very rich. In the past, the Mbinga Cooperation Union (MBICU) was responsible for supporting the coffee industry amongst the Matengo farmers. However, in 1993, following economic liberalisation, they filed for bankruptcy as they could not compete with the private growers.

== Social practices ==
The Matengo society follows the patrilineal hierarchy and is polygamous. The land holding of each family is normally a small ridge of the hill region adjoining streams for supply of water for cultivation. The land they cultivate is termed as "ntumbo". Married women hire the ntumbo land from their father-in-law and are usually engaged in growing staple food crops such as maize and beans. They also raise livestock of cattle and pigs to supplement their income. The men, however, exclusively grow coffee, as cash crop to ensure economic prosperity.

Musical changes that have occurred here are a reflection of economic and political changes as well as the gendered decision of the highland dancers.

Matengo people live in one-room jiko (house) tenements which serve as their kitchen, dining room, and favourite place to entertain guests. Ugali, is their main daily diet which is thick corn porridge; fish or meat are also added to the ugali.

== Folklore ==
Folklore is rich amongst the Matengo and folk tales are passed on from generation to generation orally. The folk tales of Matengo people have been recorded by Catholic missionaries, and Fr. Johannes P. Häfliger was the first person to publish some of folk tales. Motengo language as such does not have any script and does not have a uniform system for its sounds. Hence, all tales narrated are an oral rendition, which are translated into English. These generally involve animals or families. Notable Matengo folklore tales include "Hare and the Great Drought," "How Hare Helped Civet," and "What Hare Did To Lion and Hyena", "Hare, Civet and Antelope", "The Tale of Two Women", "The Tale of an Uncle and his Nephew", the "Tale of Nokamboka", "Katigija," "Hawk and Crow," and "The Monster in the Rice Field." The traditional folk story that is often narrated is the "How Hare Helped Civet," which is about a naive African cat, his friend Lion, who hoodwinks him and tricks him, and Hare, also a con artist who outwits the Lion and extorts retribution for Civet. Joseph Mbele has published a book of these folktales, translated into English.

== Bibliography ==
- Kurosaki, Ryugo (March 2007). Multiple uses of small-scale valley bottom land: case study of the Matengo in southern Tanzania.
- Nhira, Calvin; Mapiki, Alfred (2008). Land and Water Management in Southern Africa: Towards Sustainable Agriculture. African Books Collective. pp. 258–73. ISBN 978-0-7983-0214-2.
