= Diocese of Musoma =

Roman Catholic diocese in Tanzania, Africa

Coordinates: 1.5°S 33.8°E

Diocese of Musoma Dioecesis Musomensis

Location
- Country: Tanzania
- Metropolitan: Mwanza

Statistics
- Area: 29,549 km^{2} (11,409 sq mi)
- Population: Total; Catholics: (as of 2004); 1,400,000; 250,000 (17.9%)

Information
- Rite: Latin Rite

Current leadership
- Pope: Leo XIV
- Bishop: Michael George Mabuga Msonganzila

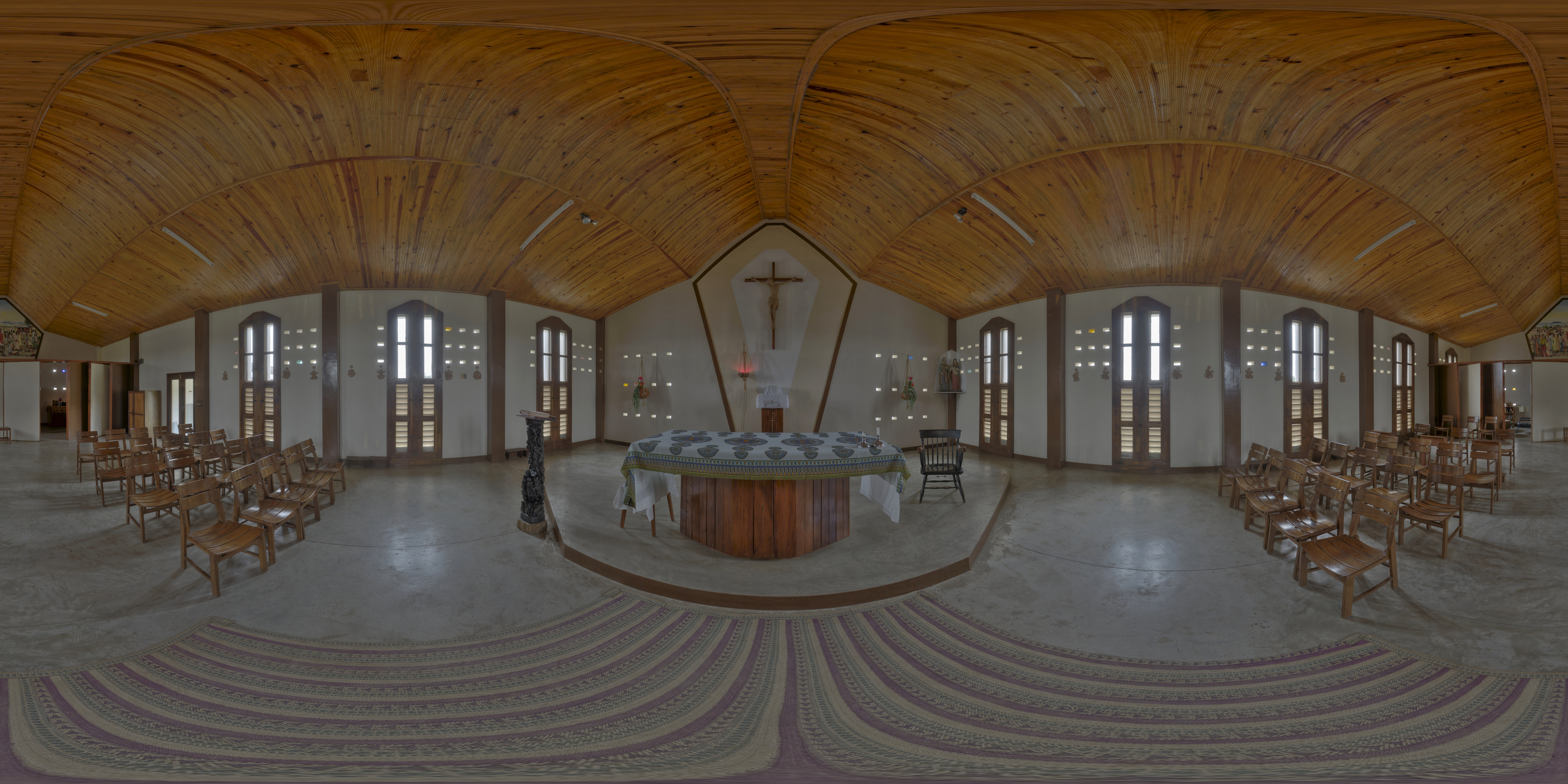
Chapel of the Makoko Language School near Musoma, Tanzania

The Roman Catholic Diocese of Musoma (Latin: Dioecesis Musomensis) is a diocese located in Musoma in the ecclesiastical province of Mwanza in Tanzania.

== History ==
- November 4, 1946: Established as Apostolic Vicariate of Musoma-Maswa from the Apostolic Vicariate of Mwanza
- June 24, 1950: Demoted as Apostolic Prefecture of Musoma
- July 5, 1957: Promoted as Diocese of Musoma
- November 27, 2010: Territory lost to Roman Catholic Diocese of Bunda

== Leadership ==
- Vicar Apostolic of Musoma-Maswa (Roman rite)
  - Bishop Joseph Blomjous, M. Afr. (1946.04.11 – 1950.06.25), appointed Vicar Apostolic of Mwanza
- Prefect Apostolic of Musoma (Roman rite)
  - Fr. Giuseppe Gerardo Grondin, M.M. (1950 – 1957)
- Bishops of Musoma (Roman rite)
  - Bishop John James Rudin, M.M. (1957.07.05 – 1979.01.12)
  - Bishop Anthony Petro Mayalla (1979.01.12 – 1987.11.18), appointed Archbishop of Mwanza
  - Bishop Justin Tetmu Samba (1988.10.25 – 2006.08.23)
  - Bishop Michael George Mabuga Msonganzila (since 2007.11.10)

== See also ==
- Roman Catholicism in Tanzania

== Sources ==
- GCatholic.org
- Catholic Hierarchy
