= Diocese of Rulenge–Ngara =

Roman Catholic diocese in Tanzania, Africa

Coordinates: 2.7179538°S 30.6321958°E

Diocese of Rulenge–Ngara Dioecesis Rulengensis–Ngarensis

Location
- Country: Tanzania
- Metropolitan: Mwanza

Statistics
- Area: 20,720 km^{2} (8,000 sq mi)
- Population: Total; Catholics: (as of 2004); 1,171,209; 595,773 (50.9%)

Information
- Rite: Latin Rite

Current leadership
- Pope: Leo XIV
- Bishop: Severine Niwemugizi

The Roman Catholic Diocese of Rulenge–Ngara (Latin: Dioecesis Rulengensis–Ngarensis) is a diocese located in Rulenge in the ecclesiastical province of Mwanza in Tanzania.

== History ==
- April 8, 1929: Established as Apostolic Vicariate of Bubuka from the Diocese of Tabora and Apostolic Vicariate of Uganda in Uganda
- 1951: Promoted as Diocese of Bukoba
- June 21, 1960: Renamed as Diocese of Rulenge
- August 14, 2008: Renamed as Diocese of Rulenge–Ngara

== Bishops ==
- Vicars Apostolic of Bukoba (Roman rite)
  - Bishop Burkard Huwiler, M. Afr. (1929.03.18 – 1946.03.20)
  - Bishop Lorenzo Tétrault, M. Afr. (1947.11.13 – 1951.03.20)
  - Bishop Alfred Lanctôt, M. Afr. (1951.12.13 – 1953.03.25 see below)
- Bishops of Bukoba (Roman rite)
  - Bishop Alfred Lanctôt, M. Afr. (see above 1953.03.25 – 1960.06.21 see below)
- Bishops of Rulenge (Roman rite)
  - Bishop Alfred Lanctôt, M. Afr. (see above 1960.06.21 – 1969.05.30)
  - Bishop Christopher Mwoleka (1969.06.26 – 1996.11.08)
  - Bishop Severine Niwemugizi (8 November 1996 - 14 August 2008 see below)
- Bishops of Rulenge–Ngara (Roman rite)
  - Bishop Severine Niwemugizi (see above since 14 August 2008)

=== Auxiliary Bishop ===
- Christopher Mwoleka (1969), appointed Bishop here

=== Other priests of this diocese who became bishops ===
- Placidus Gervasius Nkalanga, O.S.B. (priest here, 1950-1961), appointed auxiliary bishop of Bukoba in 1961 (professed in O.S.B. in 1984)
- Protase Rugambwa, appointed Bishop of Kigoma in 2008, Archbishop in 2012, Cardinal and Archbishop of Tabora in 2023

== See also ==
- Roman Catholicism in Tanzania

== Sources ==
- GCatholic.org
- Catholic Hierarchy
- Website of the Catholic Diocese of Rulenge–Ngara
