= Roman Catholic Diocese of Bukoba =

Roman Catholic diocese in Tanzania, Africa

Coordinates: 1.3316°S 31.8141°E

Diocese of Bukoba Dioecesis Bukobaënsis

Location
- Country: Tanzania
- Metropolitan: Mwanza

Statistics
- Area: 8,608 km^{2} (3,324 sq mi)
- Population: Total; Catholics: (as of 2006); 870,048; 521,256 (59.9%)

Information
- Rite: Latin Rite

Current leadership
- Pope: Leo XIV
- Bishop: Jovitus Francis Mwijage
- Bishops emeritus: Desiderius M. Rwoma, Method Kilaini

The Roman Catholic Diocese of Bukoba (Latin: Dioecesis Bukobaënsis) is a diocese located in Bukoba in the ecclesiastical province of Mwanza in Tanzania.

== History ==
- 13 December 1951: Established as Apostolic Vicariate of Lower Kagera from the Diocese of Bukoba
- 25 March 1953: Promoted as Diocese of Rutabo
- 21 June 1960: Renamed as Diocese of Bukoba

== Leadership ==
Vicar Apostolic of Lower Kagera

- Laurean Rugambwa (1951.12.13 – 1953.03.25)

Bishops of Rutabo

- Laurean Rugambwa (1953.03.25 – 1960.06.21)

Bishops of Bukoba

- Laurean Rugambwa (1960.06.21 – 1968.12.19), appointed Archbishop of Dar-es-salaam
- Placidus Gervasius Nkalanga, O.S.B. (1969.03.06 – 1973.11.26)
- Nestorius Timanywa (1973.11.26 - 2013.01.15)
- Desiderius M. Rwoma (15 January 2013 - 1 October 2022)
- Jovitus Francis Mwijage (19 October 2023 – present)

Auxiliary Bishops

- Method Kilaini (2009-2024)
- Placidus Gervasius Nkalanga, O.S.B. (1961-1969) appointed Bishop here

Other priests of this diocese who became bishops

- Method Kilaini, appointed auxiliary bishop of Dar-es-Salaam in 1999; later returned here as Auxiliary Bishop
- Novatus Rugambwa, appointed nuncio and titular archbishop in 2010
- Almachius Vincent Rweyongeza, appointed Bishop of Kayanga in 2008
- Desiderius M. Rwoma, appointed Bishop of Singida in 1999; later returned here as Bishop

Damian Kyaruzi. Bishop emeritus of Sumbawanga

== See also ==
- Roman Catholicism in Tanzania

== Sources ==
- GCatholic.org
- Catholic Hierarchy
