= Roman Catholic Archdiocese of Mwanza =

Roman Catholic archdiocese in Tanzania, Africa

Coordinates: 2.5244°S 32.9046°E

Archdiocese of Mwanza Archidioecesis Mvanzaënsis

Location
- Country: Tanzania
- Territory: Mwanza
- Ecclesiastical province: Archdiocese of Mwanza

Information
- Denomination: Catholic
- Sui iuris church: Latin Church
- Rite: Roman Rite
- Established: 1880
- Cathedral: Metropolitan Cathedral of the Epiphany

Current leadership
- Pope: Leo XIV
- Archbishop: Renatus Leonard Nkwande

The Roman Catholic Archdiocese of Mwanza (Latin: Archidioecesis Mvanzaënsis) is the Metropolitan See for the ecclesiastical province of Mwanza in Tanzania.

== History ==
- 1880: Established as Apostolic Vicariate of Nyanza from the Apostolic Vicariate of Central Africa in Sudan
- 1883: Renamed as Apostolic Vicariate of Victoria–Nyanza
- April 10, 1929: Renamed as Apostolic Vicariate of Mwanza
- March 25, 1953: Promoted as Diocese of Mwanza
- November 18, 1987: Promoted as Metropolitan Archdiocese of Mwanza
- November 27, 2010: Territory lost to Roman Catholic Diocese of Bunda

== Special churches ==
The seat of the archbishop is the Metropolitan Cathedral of the Epiphany in Mwanza.

== Bishops ==
- Vicars Apostolic of Mwanza (Roman rite)
  - Bishop Jean-Joseph Hirth, M. Afr. (1894.07.13 - 1912.12.12), appointed Vicar Apostolic of Kivu
  - Bishop Joseph Franciskus Marie Sweens, M. Afr. (1912.12.12 - 1928.11.12)
  - Bishop Antoon Oomen, M. Afr. (1929.03.18 – 1950)
  - Bishop Joseph Blomjous, M. Afr. (1950.06.25 – 1953.03.25 see below)
- Bishops of Mwanza (Roman rite)
  - Bishop Joseph Blomjous, M. Afr. (see above 1953.03.25 – 1965.10.15)
  - Bishop Renatus Lwamosa Butibubage (1966.01.15 – 1987.11.18)
- Metropolitan Archbishops of Mwanza (Roman rite)
  - Archbishop Anthony Mayala (1987.11.18 - 2009.08.20)
  - Archbishop Jude Thaddaeus Ruwa'ichi, O.F.M.Cap. (2010.11.10 - 2018.06.21), appointed Coadjutor Archbishop of Dar-es-Salaam
  - Archbishop Renatus Leonard Nkwande (2019.02.11 - )

=== Coadjutor Vicar Apostolic ===
- Joseph Franciskus Marie Sweens, M. Afr. (1910-1912)

=== Auxiliary Bishop ===
- Renatus Lwamosa Butibubage (1959-1965), appointed Bishop here

=== Other priests of this diocese who became bishops ===
- Michael George Mabuga Msonganzila, appointed Bishop of Musoma in 2007
- Renatus Leonard Nkwande, appointed Bishop of Bunda in 2010; later returned here as Archbishop

== Suffragan dioceses ==
- Bariadi
- Bukoba
- Bunda
- Geita
- Kayanga
- Musoma
- Rulenge-Ngara
- Shinyanga

== See also ==
- Roman Catholicism in Tanzania

== Sources ==
- GCatholic.org
