= Laurean Rugambwa =

First modern Black African Catholic Cardinal

His Eminence Laurean Rugambwa
- Cardinal, Archbishop Emeritus of Dar-es-Salaam
- Church: Catholic Church
- Archdiocese: Dar-es-Salaam
- See: Dar-es-Salaam
- Appointed: 19 December 1969
- Term ended: 22 July 1992
- Predecessor: Edgar Aristide Maranta
- Successor: Polycarp Pengo
- Other post: Cardinal-Priest of San Francesco d'Assisi a Ripa Grande (1960-97)
- Previous posts: Vicar Apostolic of Lower Kagera (1951-53); Titular Bishop of Febiana (1951-53); Bishop of Rutabo (1953-60); Bishop of Bukoba (1960-68)

Orders
- Ordination: 12 December 1943 by Burkhard Huwiler
- Consecration: 10 February 1952 by David James Mathew
- Created cardinal: 28 March 1960 by John XXIII
- Rank: Cardinal-Priest

Personal details
- Born: Laurean Rugambwa; 12 July 1912 Bukoba, German East Africa
- Died: 8 December 1997 (aged 85) Dar-es-Salaam, Tanzania
- Education: Pontifical Urbaniana University
- Motto: Mater boni consilii
- Coat of arms

Styles of Laurean Rugambwa
- Reference style: His Eminence
- Spoken style: Your Eminence
- Informal style: Cardinal
- See: Dar es Salaam (emeritus)

Laurean Rugambwa (12 July 1912 – 8 December 1997) was a Tanzanian Catholic prelate who served as Archbishop of Dar es Salaam from 1968 to 1992. He was made a cardinal in 1960 by Pope John XXIII, becoming the first such native African.

== Biography ==
Laurean Rugambwa was born to an aristocratic family in Bukongo, Tanganyika (present-day Kagera Region of Tanzania), and baptized with his parents at age 8, on 19 March 1921. After studying at Katigondo National Major Seminary in Uganda, he was ordained to the priesthood by Bishop Burcardo Huwiler, MAfr, on 12 December 1943. Rugambwa then did missionary work in West Africa until 1949, when he went to Rome to study at the Pontifical Urbaniana University, from which he obtained his doctorate in canon law.

On 13 December 1951 Rugambwa was appointed titular bishop of Febiana and the first Apostolic Vicar of Lower Kagera. The youngest of Africa's bishops, he received his episcopal consecration on 10 February 1952 from Archbishop David Mathew, with Bishops Joseph Kiwanuka, MAfr, and Joseph Blomjous serving as co-consecrators. When his apostolic vicariate was elevated to a diocese on 25 March 1953, Rugambwa was named Bishop of Rutabo by Pope Pius XII. He was created Cardinal Priest of S. Francesco a Ripa by Pope John XXIII in the consistory of 28 March 1960. He was the first native African cardinal of the modern era. On the following 21 June his diocese was renamed Bukoba.

Described as a progressive, Rugambwa attended the Second Vatican Council from 1962 to 1965. He strongly pushed for the Roman Curia to be internationalized. He was also an advocate of inter-Christian ecumenism.

After Vatican II Rugambwa was active in implementing its reforms. He was one of the cardinal electors in the 1963 papal conclave that elected Pope Paul VI. Advanced to Archbishop of Dar es Salaam on 19 December 1968, he later participated in the conclaves of August and October 1978, which elected Popes John Paul I and John Paul II respectively. Rugambwa resigned as Dar es Salaam's archbishop on 22 July 1992, after twenty-three years of service, during which he founded the first Catholic hospital in Ukonga and a female Roman Catholic religious institute, the Little Sisters of St. Francis of Assisi.

== Death ==
Rugambwa died in Dar es Salaam at the age of 85. He was buried in the cathedral of the Bukoba diocese after his remains were transferred from a parish church in the Kagera Region. His death left just two cardinals created by John XXIII, Raul Silva Henriquez and Franz König.

== Trivia ==
- In 1961, the Cardinal received an honorary doctorate in laws from the University of Notre Dame.
- Before returning to Tanzania after the August 1978 conclave, he visited the United States, where he then received word of Pope John Paul I's death.

== See also ==
- Novatus Rugambwa - archbishop and apostolic nuncio, also from Tanzania

Catholic Church titles
Preceded by none	Bishop of Bukoba; 1951–1968	Succeeded by Placidus Nkalanga, OSB
Preceded by Edgard Maranta, OFM Cap	Archbishop of Dar es Salaam; 1969–1992	Succeeded by Polycarp Pengo
