= List of Catholic dioceses in Tanzania =

The Roman Catholic Church in Tanzania is composed of 7 ecclesiastical provinces and 28 suffragan dioceses.

== List of dioceses ==
=== Episcopal Conference of Tanzania ===
==== Ecclesiastical Province of Arusha ====
- Archdiocese of Arusha
  - Diocese of Mbulu
  - Diocese of Moshi
  - Diocese of Same

==== Ecclesiastical Province of Dar-es-Salaam ====
- Archdiocese of Dar-es-Salaam
  - Diocese of Bagamoyo
  - Diocese of Morogoro
  - Diocese of Tanga
  - Diocese of Zanzibar
  - Diocese of Ifakara
  - Diocese of Mahenge

==== Ecclesiastical Province of Dodoma ====
- Archdiocese of Dodoma
  - Diocese of Kondoa
  - Diocese of Singida

==== Ecclesiastical Province of Mbeya ====
  - Archdiocese of Mbeya
  - Diocese of Iringa
  - Diocese of Sumbawanga
  - Diocese of Mafinga

==== Ecclesiastical Province of Mwanza ====
- Archdiocese of Mwanza
  - Diocese of Bukoba
  - Diocese of Bunda
  - Diocese of Geita
  - Diocese of Kayanga
  - Diocese of Musoma
  - Diocese of Rulenge-Ngara
  - Diocese of Shinyanga
  - Diocese of Bariadi

==== Ecclesiastical Province of Songea ====
- Archdiocese of Songea
  - Diocese of Lindi
  - Diocese of Mbinga
  - Diocese of Mtwara
  - Diocese of Njombe
  - Diocese of Tunduru-Masasi

==== Ecclesiastical Province of Tabora ====
- Archdiocese of Tabora
  - Diocese of Kahama
  - Diocese of Kigoma
  - Diocese of Mpanda
