= Jacob Venance Koda =

Tanzanian Catholic prelate (born 1957)

The Most Reverend Jacob Venance Koda
- Bishop Emeritus of Same, Tanzania
- Church: Catholic Church
- Archdiocese: Roman Catholic Archdiocese of Arusha
- See: Same
- Appointed: 16 March 1999
- Installed: 30 May 1999
- Predecessor: Josaphat Louis Lebulu
- Successor: Rogatus Kimaryo

Orders
- Ordination: 25 June 1987
- Consecration: 30 May 1999 by Polycarp Cardinal Pengo

Personal details
- Born: Jacob Venance Koda; 9 December 1957 (age 68) Kilomeni, Mwanga District, Kilimanjaro Region, Tanzania

Jacob Venance Koda (born 9 December 1957) is a Tanzanian Roman Catholic prelate who was the Bishop of the Roman Catholic Diocese of Same, Tanzania, between 1999 and 2010. He was appointed bishop of Same on 16 March 1999 by Pope John Paul II. He resigned as bishop on 15 April 2010.

== Early life and education ==
He was born in Kilomeni, Mwanga District, Kilimanjaro Region, Tanzania, on 9 December 1957. After studying philosophy and theology, he was ordained a priest of the Diocese of Same, Tanzania in June 1987.

== Priest ==
He was ordained priest of Same Diocese on 25 June 1987. He served in that capacity until 16 March 1999. On 15 April 2010, Pope Benedict XVI accepted the resignation of the Tanzanian prelate as the bishop of Same Diocese.

== Bishop ==
On 16 Mar 1999 the Holy Father John Paul II appointed him Bishop of the Roman Catholic Diocese of Same, Tanzania. He was consecrated and installed at Same on 30 May 1999. The Principal Consecrator was Polycarp Cardinal Pengo, Archbishop of Dar es Salaam assisted by Archbishop Josaphat Louis Lebulu, Archbishop of Arusha and Bishop Matthias Joseph Isuja, Bishop of Dodoma.

In 2010, The Vatican removed Bishop Jacob Koda of Same Catholic Diocese in Kilimanjaro Region in Tanzania from office for "alleged violation of church moral teachings". Bishop Koda was "advised to take time for rest, reflection and personal study". Following Bishop Koda's removal, Pope Benedict XVI appointed Father Rogatus Kimaryo CSSp, while still a priest, to be Apostolic Administrator of the Same Catholic diocese until a new bishop was appointed.

Bishop Koda, left Tanzania on a sabbatical in June 2009, and a diocesan priest was appointed apostolic administrator.

== See also ==
- Catholic Church in Tanzania

== Succession table ==
Catholic Church titles
Preceded by Josaphat Louis Lebulu (12 February 1979 - 28 November 1998)	Bishop of Same (16 March 1999 until 15 April 2010)	Succeeded by Rogatus Kimaryo
