= Rogatus Kimaryo =

Tanzanian Catholic prelate and Spiritan (born 1956)

Right Reverend Rogatus Kimaryo C.S.Sp.
- Bishop of the Diocese of Same
- Church: Catholic Church
- Metropolis: Roman Catholic Archdiocese of Arusha
- Diocese: Roman Catholic Diocese of Same
- See: Same
- Appointed: 30 April 2010
- Installed: 13 June 2010
- Predecessor: Jacob Venance Koda
- Successor: Incumbent

Orders
- Ordination: 30 May 1987
- Consecration: 13 June 2010 by Polycarp Cardinal Pengo

Personal details
- Born: Rogatus Kimaryo; 30 October 1956 (age 69) Mkuu, Rombo District, Tanganyika Territory
- Denomination: Roman Catholic
- Education: Kibosho Major Seminary, Moshi; Pontifical Gregorian University, Rome
- Motto: Caritas in Veritate (Latin for 'Charity in Truth')

Styles of Rogatus Kimaryo
- Reference style: His Grace; The Most Reverend
- Spoken style: Your Grace
- Religious style: Bishop

Rogatus Kimaryo, C.S.Sp., (born 30 October 1956) is a Tanzanian prelate of the Catholic Church. He is the Bishop of the Roman Catholic Diocese of Same, Tanzania since 2010. He was appointed bishop on 30 April 2010 by Pope Benedict XVI.

== Background and education ==
He was born at Mkuu, Rombo District, in the diocese of Moshi, Tanganyika Territory on 30 October 1956. He attended primary school in his home area between 1965 and 1972. In 1973 he entered the Maua Franciscan Minor Seminary in Moshi Diocese, where he studied for his O-Level studies. He completed his A-Level studies in 1978 at a secondary school in Mzumbe, in the Morogoro Region. He spent the two years from 1978 until 1980 performing military service in neighboring Uganda.

In August 1980 he entered the Kibosho Seminary, administered by the Congregation of the Holy Spirit, where he studied Philosophy. He then completed his canonical novitiate in Magamba, in the diocese of Tanga in 1982. He studied Theology at an institution in Nairobi, Kenya, before he was ordained a priest in May 1987.

He studied at the Pontifical Gregorian University in Rome, Italy between 1987 and 1990, where he graduated with a Licentiate of Canon Law. Later, after studying at the same university from 1994 until 1997, he obtained a Doctorate in Canon Law. He also holds a Licentiate in Religious Studies, awarded by the University of Louvain in Belgium, in 2005, having studied there since 2004.

He taught History and Geography at Ifakara Government Secondary School, in 1980, after military service.

== Priest ==
He was ordained a priest of the Congregation of the Holy Spirit (C.S.Sp.) on 30 May 1987 at Arusha. He served in that capacity until 30 April 2010.

As a priest, he served in various roles including as:

- Lecturer of Canon Law at the Seminary of the Holy Ghost Fathers in Tangaza from 1990 until 1994.
- Lecturer of Canon Law at the Apostles of Jesus Major Seminary, from 1990 until 1994.
- Lecturer of Canon Law at the Marist Seminary, from 1990 until 1994.
- Director of programmes for initial and ongoing formation for his Institute for East Africa, Indian Ocean and North Africa from 1998 until 2004.
- Parish priest of Kipawa Parish from 2006 until 2009.
- Judicial Vicar of the Inter-diocesan Tribunal, from 2006 until 2009.
- Member of the Consultors of the archdiocese of Dar-es-Salaam from 2006 until 2009.
- Lecturer at the Major Seminary at Segerea, archdiocese of Dar es Salaam from 2006 until 2009.
- On 1 May 2009 he was appointed Apostolic Administrator of the diocese of Same, which fell vacant when Bishop Jacob Venance Koda resigned.

== Bishop ==
On 30 April 2010 Pope Benedict XVI, appointed Father Rogatus Kimaryo, C.S.Sp., as Bishop of the diocese of Same in Tanzania. Up until that date the Tanzanian prelate had served as Apostolic Administrator of the diocese following the resignation of Bishop Jacob Venance Koda.

He was consecrated and installed on 13 June 2010 by Polycarp Cardinal Pengo, Archbishop of Dar-es-Salaam assisted by Archbishop Josaphat Louis Lebulu, Archbishop of Arusha and Bishop Augustine Ndeliakyama Shao, C.S.Sp., Bishop of Zanzibar.

In September 2014, the Executive Board of the Association of Member Episcopal Conferences in Eastern Africa (AMECEA), elected the Right Reverend Rogatus Kimaryo, Bishop of Same Diocese, Tanzania as the new chairman of AMECEA's Staffing Committee, for the next four years.

== See also ==
- Roman Catholic Church in Tanzania

== Succession table ==
Catholic Church titles
Preceded by Jacob Venance Koda (16 March 1999 - 15 April 2010)	Bishop of Same (Since 30 April 2010)	Succeeded by Incumbent
