= Bernardin Mfumbusa =

Tanzanian Roman Catholic bishop (1962–2026)

Most Reverend Bernardin Francis Mfumbusa
- Bishop of Kondoa, Tanzania (Deceased)
- Province: Dodoma
- Diocese: Kondoa
- Installed: 12 March 2011
- Term ended: 14 April 2026
- Predecessor: Position established
- Successor: Vacant
- Other post: President of CEPACS (2022–2026)
- Previous post: Vice-Rector of St. Augustine University of Tanzania

Orders
- Ordination: 14 June 1992 by Matthias Joseph Isuja
- Consecration: 15 May 2011 by Polycarp Pengo, Jude Thaddaeus Ruwa'ichi, Augustine Ndeliakyama Shao

Personal details
- Born: Bernardin Francis Mfumbusa; 1 April 1962 Arusha, Tanganyika
- Died: 14 April 2026 (aged 64) Dodoma, Tanzania
- Denomination: Roman Catholic
- Education: Pontifical Gregorian University

Bernardin Francis Mfumbusa (1 April 1962 – 14 April 2026) was a Tanzanian Roman Catholic prelate, who served as the first Bishop of the Roman Catholic Diocese of Kondoa from its inception in 2011 until his death in 2026. A recognized expert in social communications, he also served as the President of the Pan-African Episcopal Committee for Social Communications (CEPACS).

== Early life and education ==
Mfumbusa was born on 1 April 1962 in Arusha, in what was then Tanganyika. He pursued his studies for the priesthood at Peramiho Major Seminary and was ordained a priest for the Diocese of Dodoma on 14 June 1992.

Following his ordination, he pursued advanced studies in communication, obtaining a doctorate in social sciences (specializing in journalism) from the Pontifical Gregorian University in Rome. He also held various academic and administrative roles at the St. Augustine University of Tanzania (SAUT), eventually serving as Vice-Rector for Academic Affairs.

== Episcopal ministry ==
On 12 March 2011, Pope Benedict XVI established the Diocese of Kondoa, excising it from the Diocese of Dodoma, and appointed Mfumbusa as its first bishop. He received his episcopal consecration on 15 May 2011 from Cardinal Polycarp Pengo, with Archbishop Jude Thaddaeus Ruwa'ichi and Bishop Augustine Ndeliakyama Shao serving as co-consecrators.

Throughout his tenure, Mfumbusa was noted for his focus on education, healthcare, and interreligious dialogue within the predominantly Muslim region of Kondoa.

=== Communication leadership ===
Due to his academic background, Mfumbusa was a prominent figure in Catholic media across Africa. In 2022, he was elected President of the Pan-African Episcopal Committee for Social Communications (CEPACS), an entity under the Symposium of Episcopal Conferences of Africa and Madagascar (SECAM). In this role, he advocated for the modernization of Church media and the training of personnel to handle digital communication challenges on the continent. On 9 April 2026, Pope Leo XIV appointed him a member of the Dicastery for Communication.

== Death ==
Mfumbusa died on 14 April 2026, at the age of 64. His death was reported by the Tanzania Episcopal Conference and Vatican News, which noted his contributions as both a spiritual leader and a communication expert for the Holy See. He was buried at Kondoa, Tanzania on 22 April 2026.

Catholic Church titles
Preceded by Position established	Bishop of Kondoa (12 March 2011 – 14 April 2026)	Succeeded by Vacant
