= Baháʼí Faith in Tanzania =

The Baháʼí Faith in Tanzania begins when the first pioneer, Claire Gung, arrived in 1950 in what was then called Tanganyika. With the first Tanganyikan to join the religion in 1952 the first Baháʼí Local Spiritual Assembly was elected in 1952 of Tanganyika in Dar es Salaam. In 1956 a regional Baháʼí Assembly which included Tanganyika was elected. Later each of the constituent countries successively formed their own independent Baháʼí National Spiritual Assembly and Tanganyika, with Zanzibar, formed its own in 1964 and it and the country was renamed Tanzania. Since 1986 the Baháʼís have operated the Ruaha Secondary School as a Baháʼí school. In 2005 Baháʼís were estimated at 163,800 adherents.

== Early history ==
For much of the history of the country it was known as Tanganyika. In 1964 Zanzibar was brought under governance with Tanganyika after which the country was renamed Tanzania by merging the two names. This article will follow the timeline of name usage.

=== ʻAbdu'l-Bahá's Tablets of the Divine Plan ===
ʻAbdu'l-Bahá wrote a series of letters, or tablets, to the followers of the religion in the United States in 1916–1917; these letters were compiled together in the book Tablets of the Divine Plan. The eighth and twelfth of the tablets mentioned Africa and were written on April 19, 1916, and February 15, 1917, respectively. Publication however was delayed in the United States until 1919—after the end of the First World War and the Spanish flu. The tablets were translated and presented by Mirza Ahmad Sohrab on April 4, 1919, and published in Star of the West magazine on December 12, 1919. ʻAbdu'l-Bahá mentions Baháʼís traveling "...especially from America to Europe, Africa, Asia and Australia, and travel through Japan and China. Likewise, from Germany teachers and believers may travel to the continents of America, Africa, Japan and China; in brief, they may travel through all the continents and islands of the globe" and " ...the anthem of the oneness of the world of humanity may confer a new life upon all the children of men, and the tabernacle of universal peace be pitched on the apex of America; thus Europe and Africa may become vivified with the breaths of the Holy Spirit, this world may become another world, the body politic may attain to a new exhilaration...."

The first Baháʼí to visit Tanganyika may have been Shoghi Effendi, head of the religion after the death of ʻAbdu'l-Bahá. Rúhíyyih Khanum, his wife from 1921, shared in 1961 that Shoghi Effendi, with a male companion from the holy family, travelled from Cape Town to Cairo in the early 1920s, at the end of the traditional safaris and the beginning of safaris done by car: "He found an English hunter who took him from one point to another through the bush in East Africa - in Uganda, Kenya, or Tanganyika."

After World War II Baháʼís began to move to the region. In 1950 the British Baháʼí community was called upon by Shoghi Effendi to spearhead and co-ordinate five national Baháʼí communities in a Two Year Plan to spread the religion in Africa. Claire Gung, a German-born Baháʼí who had joined the religion in Torquay, left in 1950 to pioneer to Tanganyika as the region was called then. She was hired as an assistant teacher at a school in the Usambara Mountains region at Lushoto. For this she earned the title Knight of Baháʼu'lláh. Jalal Nakhjavani (and family), the first contemporary Persian pioneer to settle in Africa, brother of Ali Nakhjavani, entered Tanganyika in January 1951. Hasan and Isobel Sabri left for Tanganyika in July 1951 from Egypt. After Louis George Gregory, the first Hand of the Cause of African descent, died on 30 July 1951, Tanganyikan Baháʼís were among those who sent cablegrams for his memorial service. By August there were five pioneers. The first declaration of an indigenous Tanganyikan was noted on 21 August in the person of Denis Dudley-Smith Kutendele. During the formative years of Baháʼí communities in East Africa, the area received eighty pioneers, forty of whom were Persians. Forty percent of these were women. Tanganyika attracted the greatest number of Persian Baháʼís, at eighteen. Wide scale growth in the religion across Sub-Saharan Africa was observed to begin in 1950s and extend in the 1960s. In 1952 the first Local Spiritual Assembly of Tanganyika is established in Dar es Salaam. Its members were: Jalal Nakhjavani, Isobel Sabri, Hassan Sabri, Darakshandeh Khanum Nakhjavani, Leslie Matola, Denis Dudley-Smith Kutendele, Frahang Naimi Gopalkrishnan Nayer, and Eustace Mwalimu - Matola was of the Yao tribe and Mwalimu was of another tribe. In the summer of 1952 Denis Dudley-Smith Kutendele became the first pioneer to come from Tangayika when he moved to Nyasaland, now Malawi.

== Ten-Year Crusade ==
In 1953 Shoghi Effendi established a 10-year plan called the Ten Year Crusade. Waves of pioneers fanned out in a great effort to spread the religion. Ottilie Rhein pioneered to Mauritius, where she was named a Knight of Baháʼu'lláh, after having visited Kenya, Uganda and Tanganyika. After a regional conference in 1953 the first pioneer from Uganda went to Mwanza, Tanganyika and native Tito Wanantsusi joined him there. An early pioneer to Zanzibar was Salisa Karikal before the end of 1953.

In 1954 Dr. Farhūmand left Tehran and settled in the country with his three children; his wife followed. Dr. Farhūmand was particularly noted for his founding a multiracial clinic in Dar es Salaam and eventually served as personal physician to the first president of Tanzania. The death of a Persian Baháʼí, Mrs. Afrūḵta, widow of Yunis Khan, provided the opportunity for the still emerging Baháʼí community of Dar es Salaam to establish the first multiracial cemetery in that city.

By January 1956 the first Baháʼí arrived on Pemba Island. Later in 1956 Shoghi Effendi called for the establishment of regional national assemblies of Baháʼís to supervise the developing communities in regions of Africa. In the case of central and east Africa the regional assembly included many countries whose names have changed since then but at the time they were known as Belgian Congo, Kenya, Tanganyika, Comoro Is., Ruanda-Urundi, Uganda, French Equatorial Africa, Seychelles, Zanzibar, were part of the regional national assembly for Central & East Africa. The convention was held in Kampala Uganda and delegates from Tanganyika and Zanzibar attended. Hasan Balyuzi, then Chairman of the National Spiritual Assembly of the Baháʼís of the United Kingdom, whose task it was to target pioneers to Tanganyika, and Hand of the Cause Músá Banání represented Shoghi Effendi at the event. The members of the first regional national assembly were Ali Nakbjavani, Philip Hainsworth, Hassan Sabri, Oloro Epyeruj, Aziz Yazdi, Jalal Nakhjavani, Tito Wanantsusit, Sylvester Okurut, and Max Kenyerezi.

The regional assembly established short term schools - Tanganyika held its first weekend school in 1957. The school started on a Saturday afternoon with an opening devotional program and the first class, followed by dinner and an evening of social activity. Sunday morning and part of the afternoon was devoted to more classes, panel discussions, demonstrations of the various procedures of Baha'i administrative life, such as elections and consultations, and question and answer sessions, and ending with a devotional. In early 1957 Gung moved from Tanganyika to Uganda where she founded a multi-racial kindergarten nursery. In April the Local Spiritual Assembly of Dar es Salaam obtained their civic registration according to the Trustee's Incorporation Ordinance of Tanganyika. The community of Tanganyika held three weekend schools in 1959. Four Tanganyikan's attended the centralized school held in Kampala in 1960. Conferences on the progress of the religion were held in 1960 at Mashi and Tunga with attendance by Hand of Cause Músá Banáni.

In 1961 the Baháʼí House of Worship for Africa was dedicated. Over 1500 people attended. Among the Baháʼís were some 225 African Baháʼís from Uganda, Kenya, Tanganyika, Ruanda Urundi, Ethiopia, Northern Rhodesia, Swaziland, and South Africa; some 90 Persian Baha'is, sixty-two of whom flew from Tehran; the British national assembly, the mother assembly to that of Central and East Africa, sent one believer from each of its regions - England, Scotland and Wales, as well as one from Ireland; the American national assembly sent one of its members, Amos Gibson, himself a pioneer among the American Indian peoples. Following the dedications Rúhíyyih Khanum traveled through the area for a few months spending part of February in Tanganyika.

The growth in the religion across the regional assembly of Central and East Africa was called "the most spectacular" by the Custodians who carried on the work of the religion between death of Shoghi Effendi and the election of the Universal House of Justice. In 1962 there were many Baháʼís in Central and East Africa (over 42,000). Hand of the Cause Enoch Olinga toured the region in 1962 and addressed gatherings at variety of locations in Tanganyika such as Usambara Estate, where about 1,400 people heard him; at Dar es Salaam, where two meetings were held; at Kivukoni College and at Mnazi Mmoja attended by over 150 people.

locations of some Baháʼí assemblies and registered groups in 1963 in Tanzania

=== Survey ===
In 1963 a survey was accomplished of the religion. In Tanzania it identifies there were 41 assemblies, 65 groups between 1 and 9 adults, and 48 isolated individuals.

- The assemblies included those from Bukoba, Dar es Salaam, Makuyuni, Mkomazi, Pemba Mnazi, Moshi, Morogoro, and Mwanza.
- Registered groups of Baháʼís included those from Arusha, Dodoma, Iringa, Kanga, Kilomeni, Mbeya, Mikumi, Musoma, Pongwe Pogwe, Ruvu, Shinyanga, Songea, Tukuyu, Ukerewe Island and Zanzibar City.

== A national community ==
Following the election of the Universal House of Justice, the Baháʼí populations across the African countries began to form their own National Spiritual Assembly: In 1964 - Tanganyika and Zanzibar and nearby islands together formed their own assembly in time with the civic changes (including the new name of Tanzania) while others across sub-Saharan continued to form up to the 1990s. The national convention for the Baháʼís of Tanganyika, Zanzibar, Mafia Island, and Pemba Island was held on May 1 though train breaks downs and flooded roads limited attendance by about half the delegates. The second half arrived the next morning reaching a total of 42 delegates. Hand of the Cause Músá Banání represented the Custodians and the newly elected Universal House of Justice at the convention. Many messages from Baháʼí communities arrived congratulating the Tanzanians from throughout the world which gave the delegates a grasp of breadth of the worldwide community. Those elected to the first national assembly were: H. S. Akida, Allen Elston, Mary Elston, Lamuka Mwangulu, Jalal Nakhjavani, Wallace NgaUomba, Glory Nyirenda, Ruhulah Yazdani and Jamsheed Samandari. As of 1965 there were 75 local assemblies and Baháʼís in about 265 localities. The Baháʼí assembly of Karachi, Pakistan was host to A. A. Badii of the Sokoine University of Agriculture campus of Morogo and a member of the national assembly of Tanzania in August 1967 and the national center buildings was finished in 1968. Hand of the Cause Enoch Olinga attended the 1968 convention at the new center. In 1969 the national assembly was officially recognized as a religious institution by the government.

=== Developments within and without ===
In 1970 Hand of the Cause Rúhíyyih Khanum reprised her briefer tour from 1961 but this time took the month of September to tour through Tanzania as part of a trip through eastern Africa. She visited Tanga, Dar es Salaam spoke to an audience of over two hundred, a ten-minute interview on the Tanzania government radio station, and meta member of the Tanzanian Supreme Court, the Rotary Club, then to Mafia Island where a meeting was held in the municipal hall, down to eastern and southern parts of the country. In part she visited places she visited in 1962 including Mwami where a big tree served as shade for a meeting. In April 1972 a campaign to present the religion in the town of Arusha had posters, fliers, pamphlets, books, culminated in a talk, songs by a choir, and prayers all with translations in Swahili with invitations to follow-up informational meetings. In June the Hand of the Cause Rahmatu'lláh Muhájir visited Malaysia and while there encouraged Inparaju Chinniah to go to Africa as a travelling teacher where he spent six months in Tanzania on leave without salary and made a contribution to the work of the Faith there. In October celebrations for United Nations Day were carried out in three Baha'i communities in Tanzania with talks and films. In November an Indian Baháʼí, A. K. Forudi, toured the deep countryside near the border with Kenya promulgating the religion and offering classes on the religion to the Baháʼís there. He returned in January 1973 and toured more villages. In early 1973 Ruhíyyíh Khanúm again visited in Tanzania. In July 1973 a delegation from the national assembly was able to meet with then President William Tolbert of Liberia during his visit to a conference in Tanzania and in the same month there was an informational booth at the fair held on Saba Saba Day. By the end of 1973 children's classes are being taught in Magamba-Kwalonge village.

In 1976 the national assembly produced a document Loyalty to Government: The Baha'i Viewpoint as well as participated in a national conference on the progress of the religion as part of a broad review across the region kicked off by an international conference held in Kenya. 1976 also saw the national assembly of Swaziland, Mozambique and Angola printing translations of Baháʼí prayers into the Yao language spoken in southern Tanzania and beyond. A Tanzanian delegation also met with Rashidi Kawawa and presented volume XIV of Baháʼí World.

The Uganda-Tanzania War broke out in 1978 and Ugandan President Idi Amin was overthrown by early 1979. This precipitated the conditions resulting in the murder of Hand of the Cause Enoch Olinga in September though details of the event weren't shared widespread until May 1980. The news of his murder was conveyed to the African office of the Continental Counselors by Claire Gung. Claire Gung herself died in 1985 entitled Knight of Baháʼu'lláh and Mother of Africa. Amidst the tragedy in October 1979 the Baháʼís of Tanzania hosted meetings at the national center for United Nations Day as well as a national conference on the progress of the religion in the country.

In 1986 the Universal House of Justice asked several African countries to develop audio-visual Mobile Teaching Institutes including Tanzania. The community also hosted a public meeting for the International Year of Peace at Dar es Salaam on November 29, 1986, called "Perspectives on Peace". In 1987 the sixth National Youth Conference in Kenya drew attendees from Tanzania among other places. In September 1987, the national assembly met with various institutions to plan two campaigns - one in the Kasulu district of the Kigoma region on Lake Tanganyika and the other in the Morogoro region in central Tanzania which including a traveling youth choir and slide show. By July 1988 several new local assemblies and Baháʼís resulted. Back in June a Tanzanian national youth conference was hosted at the Ruaha Secondary School. A May 1989 campaign took place in the Same District aimed particularly at public school teachers.

=== Service for society ===
Since its inception the religion has had involvement in socio-economic development beginning by giving greater freedom to women, promulgating the promotion of female education as a priority concern, and that involvement was given practical expression by creating schools, agricultural coops, and clinics. In 1979 in Tanzania the Baháʼí community participated in a seminar on alcoholism and drug abuse organized by the Karibu Tanzania Project under the Ministry of National Culture and Youth. The religion entered a new phase of activity when a message of the Universal House of Justice dated 20 October 1983 was released. Baháʼís were urged to seek out ways, compatible with the Baháʼí teachings, in which they could become involved in the social and economic development of the communities in which they lived. Worldwide in 1979 there were 129 officially recognized Baháʼí socio-economic development projects. By 1987, the number of officially recognized development projects had increased to 1482. This was the beginnings of ecological preservation projects by Baháʼís began in this era. And a review looking past 1987 focused on deepening women in the understanding of the Baháʼí Faith because widens their perspective and gives them self-confidence. This can be done by holding women's conferences at local, regional, and perhaps, national levels to both deepen them in the Baháʼí teachings and to provide a forum for discussion of women's ideas and concerns. As a follow-up, the production and circulation of a women's magazine, focusing on the same topics as the conferences, and with special emphasis on nutrition education, would be helpful. A 1986 review noted three larger projects in Tanzania - a carpentry workshop, and a nursery school were up and running and plans for a technical/agricultural school were initiated. This school developed into the Ruaha Secondary School (see below.) Additionally, a program to train volunteer community health educators was conducted. In 1989 a Baháʼí expert and businessman in using appropriate technology from Swaziland traveled through six southern and eastern African countries including Tanzania training local people in the manufacture of several kinds of fence-making machines and other technologies in building, agriculture and water programs. The 10-day training courses were organized by the National Spiritual Assemblies in each of the six countries.

== Modern community ==
=== Internal developments ===
Savannah, Georgia native Mike O'Neal and son Darrell took on a multi-nation tour of Africa on behalf of the Universal House of Justice as part of a delegation of other African-American Bahai's who visited Uganda, Kenya and Tanzania in January 1999.

A succession of newsletters relates the advancement of the implementation of the Ruhi Institute and other recent developments in Tanzania. The November 2001 newsletter reviews the recent plans affecting Baháʼí development from 1996. The March 2002 edition reviews the books of the Ruhi Institute and the role of tutors. The June 2002 focuses on the role of the tutor. The September 2002 newsletter calls for a campaign for more tutors especially in four regions of Tanzania as well as the opportunities and limitations of being a tutor. The February 2003 newsletter related the number of Ruhi Books and the categorization of a cluster, celebrated tutors who had facilitated many courses as well as news that some of the general public had taken part in study circles. The August 2003 newsletter focused on the case of the Nyaruyoba Cluster, found in Kibondo District (Kigoma) and noted it was the fastest advancing cluster in Tanzania. It also reviewed with some detail which locations had proceeded further through the books and goals to look forward to.

=== Multiplying interests ===
The Universal House of Justice released a letter "to the world's religious leaders" in April 2002. In Tanzania, the Baha'i community conveyed this letter to about 30 leaders. Some of the responses were positive - for example, Biharilal Keshavji Tanna of the Hindu Council of Tanzania wrote: "I have read the document with great interest and feel that it contains a supremely important message not only to the leaders of the faith groups, but to all thinking individuals, who must shoulder the duty and responsibility of breaking down barriers amongst the various groups of the family of mankind."

The Baháʼís worked with other religious leaders through the Christian Social Services Commission to work with people in the villages and sub-villages (vijiji and vitongoji) in preventing malaria.

An article by a university scholar in the Encyclopedia of Peace Education noticed that Baháʼís contribute to peace through involvement in interfaith activities and dialogue to encourage religious tolerance, freedom of belief and elimination of religious prejudice and presented the efforts of the Baha'i community in Tanzania to hold a day for all religions to pray for peace on November 9, 2005.

In 2006 the Dar es Salaam Union Student Organization and the Baháʼí community of Tanzania sponsored a symposium which examined the theme "The Role of Family and Youth in Establishing Brighter Communities." The event was held on United Nations Day and placed a number people on panels to discuss issues - Baha'is, government officers, Christian NGO leaders, youth leaders, an author, and a university professor and similar groups were in the audience.

The General Assembly of the United Nations, in its resolution 61/221 of 20 December 2006, (OP. 14) decided to convene in 2007 a high-level dialogue on interreligious and intercultural cooperation with formal and informal meetings. The President of the General Assembly appointed a Civil Society 'Task Force' to assist in the selection of participants and in identifying the sub-themes of the hearing. Baháʼís were among the twenty speakers who represented a variety of cultural (all continents) and religious (Muslim, Christian, Jewish, Hindu, Jain, Baha'i) traditions. The second panel discussion addressed the theme of "Best Practices and Strategies of Interreligious and Intercultural Cooperation Going Forward". The Representative of the Baháʼí International Community in Tanzania underscored that the freedom to hold belief of one's choosing and to change it, was an essential attribute of the human conscience, and recommended concrete strategies to overcome ignorance and fanaticism.

=== Ruaha Secondary School ===
The Ruaha Secondary School, is a Baháʼí school run by the National Spiritual Assembly of the Baháʼís of Tanzania. Its development reaches back to 1985 when Baháʼí funds began the construction of the site, that the town of Iringa had donated using bricks that were fired onsite. With the approval of the Tanzanian Ministry of Education classes began on March 27, 1986. It added a year of school per year it was open aiming to include technical college level course work. By 1988 the school had 300 students. The curriculum, which is determined by the Ministry, includes English, Swahili, geography, history, agriculture, chemistry, physics, biology, political science, mathematics and religion - Christian, Islamic and Baháʼí studies included, by representatives of different religions. Each student takes part in regularly scheduled activities in self-reliance such as carrying bricks, planting bananas, digging foundations, watering and weeding his own trees, etc. Several of the founding staff were pioneers to Tanzania - one from Iran, one from Lebanon, one from Australia, and three from America. There was also local staff hired as teachers. The school is affiliated with a local teacher training college and also provides services to the local community.

In 1992 a paper was presented examining implementing computer technologies in an African context. In 1999 the school advertised for teachers and staff for Accounts/Computers and English/oral Education Teacher and was associated with the local Baha'i nursery school. It also advertised for Baháʼí Youth Year of Service opportunities. It also received a two-year, US$122,000 grant to build a new girls' dormitory capable of housing 120 students. The grant, for 141,630 Euros, was given by the Unity Foundation, a Baháʼí-inspired development agency in Luxembourg. The first installment of the grant was sent in 2001. The rest arrived by October 2002.

One of the unique aspects to the school culture is the total absence of caning. Instead, the school emphasizes promoting virtues like patience, diligence, courtesy, trustworthiness, compassion and justice, while also helping students in developing skills such as agricultural techniques, computer literacy and basic commerce. The school also takes part in the promotion of education for girls. Furthermore, the school aims to contribute to the conservation of the environment. As a part of the school's student government, the Environmental Ambassadors project aims at playing a role in the conservation of the environment. In every Form there are a number of Environmental Ambassadors chosen from volunteers for this purpose.

In more recent years it has had support from Mona Foundation. A site master site plan was evolved with help from architect Ben Hufford, of Yost Grube Hall Architectural Firm in Portland, Oregon in February 2006. In August 2006 two trainers were sent to give a workshop for selected staff in the use of Microsoft Unlimited Potential curriculum. The foundation has contributed funds for construction of a boys' hostel (120 bed capacity), a kitchen/dry foods store, a water system (borehole well) and for purchase of a generator to provide electricity during outages.

=== Demographics ===
In 1993, just over 50 years from the start of the presence of the religion in the region, there were an estimated 223,000 Baháʼís in East Africa and 1,268 Baháʼí local spiritual assemblies. Baháʼís could be found in 508 localities, of which 191 have spiritual assemblies in Tanzania. In 2000 - the World Christian Encyclopedia estimated some 140,600 Baháʼís in Tanzania. In 2005 Association of Religion Data Archives, based on World Christian Encyclopedia, estimated some 163,800, Baháʼís (0.4% of the national population.)

== See also ==
- Religion in Tanzania
- History of Tanzania
