= Mwanga =

Mwanga may refer to:

- Mwanga I of Buganda
- Mwanga II of Buganda, the last monarch of an independent Buganda
- Danny Mwanga, a Major League Soccer striker
- Junior Mwanga, French footballer
- Mwanga District, a district of the Kilimanjaro Region of Tanzania
- Mwanga, Tanzania, a town of the Mwanga District in Tanzania
- Mwanga (Tanzanian ward), a ward in the Mkalama District in Tanzania
- Mwanga people, of Zambia and Tanzania
- Mwanga language
