= Anthony Gaspar Lagwen =

Tanzanian Catholic prelate

The Most Reverend Anthony Gaspar Lagwen
- Bishop of Mbulu
- Church: Catholic Church
- Archdiocese: Roman Catholic Archdiocese of Arusha
- See: Mbulu
- Appointed: 22 May 2016
- Installed: 12 August 2018

Orders
- Ordination: 18 October 1999
- Consecration: 12 August 2018 by Polycarp Cardinal Pengo
- Rank: Bishop

Personal details
- Born: Anthony Gaspar Lagwen; 5 July 1967 (age 57); Tlawi, Diocese of Mbulu, Manyara Region, Tanzania

Styles of Anthony Gaspar Lagwen
- Reference style: Your Lordship; The Most Reverend
- Spoken style: His Lordship
- Religious style: Bishop

Anthony Gaspar Lagwen (born 5 July 1967) is a Tanzanian Catholic prelate who serves as the Bishop of the Roman Catholic Diocese of Mbulu. He was appointed bishop of Mbulu on 22 May 2018 by Pope Francis.

== Background and education ==
He was born on 5 July 1967, at Tlawi, Diocese of Iringa, Iringa Region, Tanzania. He attended primary and secondary schools in his home area. He studied at St. Joseph Junior Seminary Sanu, in Mbulu Diocese, Manyara Region, where he completed his secondary school education. He studied philosophy at the Interdiocesan Saint Anthony Major Seminary, in Ntungamo, Bukoba Diocese. He then attended the Interdiocesan Saint Paul Major Seminary in Kipalapala, in the archdiocese of Tabora, where he studied Theology.

He graduated wit a Bachelor of Business Administration, awarded in 2004 by the St. Augustine University of Tanzania in Mwanza, having studied there since 2000. From 2009 until 2011, he studies at the Eastern and Southern African Management Institute (ESAMI) in Arusha, graduating with a Master of Business Administration from there.

== Priesthood ==
He was ordained a priest of the diocese of Mbulu on 18 October 1999. He served in that capacity until 22 May 2018.

As a priest he served in various roles including as:

- Parish vicar of Bashay Parish from 1999 until 2000.
- Bursar of the Diocese of Mbulu from 2004 until 2009.
- Bursar of the Diocese of Mbulu from 2012 until 2018.

== As bishop ==
He was appointed Bishop of the Roman Catholic Diocese of Mbulu, Tanzania on 22 May 2018. He was consecrated and installed at Mbulu in the Archdiocese of Arusha on 12 August 2018, by the hands of Polycarp Cardinal Pengo, Archbishop of Dar es Salaam assisted by Archbishop Isaac Amani Massawe, Archbishop of Arusha and Archbishop Jude Thaddaeus Ruwa'ichi, Coadjutor Archbishop of Dar es Salaam.

== See also ==
- Catholic Church in Tanzania

== Succession table ==
Catholic Church titles
Preceded by Beatus Kinyaiya (22 April 2006 - 6 November 2014)	Bishop of Mbulu (Since 22 May 2018)	Succeeded by Incumbent
