= Stephano Lameck Musomba =

Tanzanian Roman Catholic prelate (born 1969)

The Most Reverend Stephano Lameck Musomba
- Bishop of Bagamoyo, Tanzania
- Church: Catholic Church
- Archdiocese: Roman Catholic Archdiocese of Dar es Salaam
- See: Bagamoyo
- Appointed: 7 March 2025
- Installed: 7 March 2025
- Predecessor: None

Orders
- Ordination: 24 July 2003
- Consecration: 21 September 2021 by Jude Thaddaeus Ruwa'ichi
- Rank: Bishop

Personal details
- Born: Stephano Lameck Musomba; 25 September 1969 (age 56) Malonji, Ulenje Ward, Mbeya Rural District, Mbeya Region, Diocese of Mbeya, Tanzania

Styles of Stephano Lameck Musomba
- Reference style: Your Lordship; The Most Reverend
- Spoken style: His Lordship
- Religious style: Bishop

Stephano Lameck Musomba (O.S.A.), (born on 25 September 1969), is a Tanzanian Roman Catholic prelate who is the Bishop of the newly-created Roman Catholic Diocese of Bagamoyo, Tanzania since March 2025. Before that, from July 2021 until March 2025, he was Auxiliary Bishop of the Roman Catholic Archdiocese of Dar es Salaam. He concurrently served as Titular Bishop of Perdices. He was appointed bishop by Pope Francis on 7 July 2021. He was consecrated and installed at Dar es Salaam on 21 September 2021. On 7 March 2025, The Holy Father Francis appointed him as the pioneer bishop of the Catholic Diocese of Bagamoyo, a new diocese that the Pope created that same day.

== Background and education ==
He was born on 25 September 1969 in Malonji Village, Ulenje Ward, Mbeya Rural District, Mbeya Region, Diocese of Mbeya, Tanzania. He studied philosophy and theology at the Jordan University College of Morogoro. He also holds a Licentiate in patrology awarded by the Augustinian Patristic Pontifical Institute in Rome, Italy.

== Priest ==
He took his solemn vows as a member of the Order of Saint Augustine (OSA), on 25 September 2002. He was ordained a priest of that same religious order on 24 July 2003. He served in that capacity until 7 July 2021.

As a priest, he served in various roles in different locations, including as:

- Assistant parish priest of Immaculate Conception Parish, in Mavurunza, Dar-es-Salaam, from 2003 until 2004 and from 2014 until 2016.
- Parish priest of Immaculate Conception Parish in Mavurunza, Dar-es-Salaam from 2018 until 2021.
- Formator in the House of Formation of the Order of Saint Augustine in Morogoro from 2008 until 2009 and from 2016 until 2018.
- Lecturer in the Faculty of Theology of Jordan University College in Morogoro from 2008 until 2009.
- Parish priest of Saint Augustine Parish in Ternboni in Dar-es-Salaam from 2009 until 2014.
- Prior of the Community of Saint Monica from 2018 until 2021.

== Bishop ==
On 7 July 2021 he was appointed Titular Bishop of Perdices and Auxiliary of Dar-es-Salaam by Pope Francis. He was consecrated and installed at the Msimbazi Centre Grounds, Dar-es-Salaam, in the Archdiocese of Dar-es-Salaam. The Principal Consecrator was Archbishop Jude Thaddaeus Ruwa'ichi, Archbishop of Dar-es-Salaam assisted by Bishop Salutaris Melchior Libena, Bishop of Ifakara and Bishop Augustine Ndeliakyama Shao, Bishop of Zanzibar.

On 7 March 2025, the Holy Father Francis created the Roman Catholic Diocese of Bagamoyo by splitting the Roman Catholic Diocese of Morogoro, with both dioceses remaining suffragans of the Metropolitan Province of Dar es Salaam. Pope Francis appointed Bishop Stephano Lameck Musomba, until then Titular Bishop of Perdices and Auxiliary of Dar-es-Salaam, as the pioneer bishop of the new Bagamoyo diocese.

== See also ==
- Catholic Church in Tanzania

== Succession table ==
Catholic Church titles
Preceded by	Auxiliary Bishop of Dar es Salaam; 7 July 2021 - 7 March 2025	Succeeded by
Preceded by Diocese created	Bishop of Bagamoyo (since 7 March 2025)	Succeeded by Incumbent
