= Beatus Kinyaiya =

Tanzanian prelate of the Catholic Church (born 1957)

The Most Reverend Beatus Kinyaiya O.F.M. Cap
- Archbishop of Dodoma, Tanzania
- Church: Catholic Church
- Archdiocese: Roman Catholic Archdiocese of Dodoma
- Metropolis: Dodoma
- Diocese: Roman Catholic Archdiocese of Dodoma
- Appointed: 6 November 2014
- Installed: 18 January 2015
- Predecessor: Gervas John Mwasikwabhila Nyaisonga
- Successor: Incumbent

Orders
- Ordination: 25 June 1989
- Consecration: 2 July 2006 by Polycarp Cardinal Pengo
- Rank: Archbishop

Personal details
- Born: Beatus Kinyaiya; 9 May 1957 (age 69) Shimbwe, Kilimanjaro Region, Tanzania
- Denomination: Roman Catholic
- Education: University of London; Pontifical University of Saint Anthony

Styles of Beatus Kinyaiya
- Reference style: The Most Reverend
- Spoken style: Your Grace
- Religious style: His Grace

Ordination history of Beatus Kinyaiya
History
Episcopal consecration
- Principal consecrator: Polycarp Cardinal Pengo, (Archbishop Emeritus of Dar es Salaam)
- Co-consecrators: Josaphat Louis Lebulu (Archbishop of Catholic Archdiocese of Arusha); Jude Thaddaeus Ruwa'ichi O.F.M.cap (Roman Catholic Bishop of Mbulu)

Beatus Kinyaiya, O.F.M. Cap. (born 9 May 1957) is a Roman Catholic prelate who is the Archbishop of the Roman Catholic Archdiocese of Dodoma in Tanzania since 2014. Before that, from 2006 until 2014, he was the Bishop of the Catholic Diocese of Mbulu, Tanzania. He was appointed bishop on 22 April 2006 by Pope Benedict XVI.

== Early years and education ==
Beatus Kinyaiya was born on 9 May 1957 at Shimbwe, in the Roman Catholic Diocese of Moshi in the Kilimanjaro Region of Tanzania. He attended primary school at Shimbwe. He entered the Franciscan Seminary Maua in Moshi where he completed his O-Level studies. He then completed his A-Level studies at the Itaga Minor Seminary in the Tabora Region. He then spent his novitiate year in the Order of the Capuchin Fathers at Basita.

He studied philosophy at the Major Seminary of Our Lady of the Angels, Kibosho, in Kilimanjaro Region. He then transferred to the Saint Charles Lwanga Senior Seminary at Segerea in the Archdiocese of Dar es Salaam where he studied Theology. He holds a Bachelor of Arts degree and a Master of Arts degree, both awarded by the University of London. He also studied Spiritual Theology at the Pontifical University of St Anthony (Antonianum).

== Priest ==
He professed to belong to the Order of Friars Minor Capuchin (O.F.M.Cap.) on 5 June 1988. He was ordained a priest of the same Order on 25 June 1989. He served in that capacity until 22 April 2006.

After his ordination he ministered in different roles and various locations including as follows:

- Vice Rector and lecturer at the Franciscan Seminary Maua in Moshi from 1989 until 1992.
- Rector at the Franciscan Seminary at Maua from 1996 until 1999.
- Provincial Superior for Tanzania of the Order of the Capuchin Fathers from 1999 until 2005.
- President of the Capuchin Superiors Major of EACC.
- President of the Religious Superiors Association of Tanzania (RSAT).

== Bishop ==
On 22 April 2006, The Holy Father Benedict XVI appointed him Bishop of the Roman Catholic Diocese of Mbulu. He was consecrated and installed at Mbulu on 2 July 2006 by the hands of Polycarp Cardinal Pengo, Archbishop of Dar es Salaam assisted by Archbishop Josaphat Louis Lebulu, Archbishop of Arusha and Bishop Jude Thaddaeus Ruwa'ichi, (O.F.M.Cap.), Bishop of Dodoma.

On 6 November 2014, Pope Francis created the Roman Catholic Diocese of Dodoma with Singida and Kondoa as Suffragan dioceses. The same day, he appointed the Right Reverend Beatus Kinyaiya, O.F.M. Cap. as Archbishop of Dodoma, Tanzania. He was installed there on 18 January 2015. On 26 August 2015, Archbishop Beatus Kinyaiya of Dodoma received the Pallium from the Papal Nuncio in the presence of the congregation at Saint Paul of the Cross Cathedral in Dodoma. The members of the Tanzania Episcopal Conference (TEC) appointed him their vice president between 2015 and 2018.

== See also ==
- Catholic Church in Tanzania

== Succession table ==
Catholic Church titles
Preceded by Jude Thaddaeus Ruwa'ichi (9 February 1999 - 15 January 2005)	Bishop of Mbulu (22 April 2006 until 6 November 2014)	Succeeded by Anthony Gaspar Lagwen (22 May 2018 - present)
Preceded by None (Archdioce created) Last Bishop: Gervas John Mwasikwabhila Nyaisonga (9 January 2011 - 17 February 2014)	Archbishop of Dodoma (since 6 November 2014)	Succeeded by Incumbent
