= Edward Elias Mapunda =

Tanzanian Catholic prelate

The Most Reverend Edward Elias Mapunda
- Bishop of Singida
- Church: Catholic Church
- Archdiocese: Roman Catholic Archdiocese of Dodoma
- See: Singida
- Appointed: 28 April 2015
- Installed: 5 July 2015
- Predecessor: Desiderius M. Rwoma
- Successor: Incumbent

Orders
- Ordination: 23 November 1997 by Bernard Mabula
- Consecration: 5 July 2015 by Bernard Mabula

Personal details
- Born: Edward Elias Mapunda; 30 September 1964 (age 60); Mango Village, Diocese of Singida, Tanzania

Edward Elias Mapunda (born 30 September 1964) is a Tanzanian Roman Catholic prelate who is the Bishop of the Roman Catholic Diocese of Singida, Tanzania. He was appointed bishop of Singida on 28 April 2015 by Pope Francis.

== Early life and education ==
He was born on 30 September 1964 in Mango Village, in the Catholic Diocese of Mbinga, in the Ruvuma Region, Tanzania. He is the first born in his family. He attended primary school at Mango Primary School in Mbinga, from 1974 until 1980. In 1983 he joined the catholic youth group called VIWAWA at Makiungu Parish, in the Catholic Diocese of Singida. He joined Dung'unyi Seminary, where he studied form one to form four from 1984 until 1987. He then joined Rubya Seminary in Bukoba Diocese, where he completed form five and form six between 1988 and 1989.

Bishop Edward Mapunda did his Philosophical studies at Ntungamo Major Seminary from 1990 to 1992. Thereafter he joined Segerea Senior Seminary, where he studied Theology, from 1992 until 1996. From 2000 until 2004, he studied at the University of Dar es Salaam, graduating with a Bachelor of Arts degree in Education. He also holds an advanced degree in Theology, obtained from a university in Ireland.

== Priest ==
He was ordained deacon of Singida on 30 November 1996. Then on 23 November 1997 he was ordained priest of Singida. On both occasions the Ordinator was Bishop Bernard Mabula, Bishop of Singida. He served as priest until 28 April 2015.

While priest, he served in various roles inside and outside his diocese including as:

- Lecturer and formator at Dung'unyi Seminary from 1997 until 1998.
- Executive Secretary of Catechesis in the Diocese of Singida from 1998 until 2000.
- Lecturer, formator and Vice Rector at Dung'unyi Seminary from 2004 until 2006.
- Diocesan Treasurer General, Singida Diocese from 2006 until 2014
- Diocesan Executive Secretary of Health Department from 2006 until 2014
- Diocesan Executive Secretary of Education from 2006 until 2014.

== Bishop ==
On 28 April 2015 the Holy Father appointed him Bishop of the Diocese of Singida, Tanzania. He was consecrated and installed on 5 July 2015, at Singida, in the Diocese of Singida. The Principal Consecrator was Archbishop Paul Runangaza Ruzoka, Archbishop of Tabora assisted by Bishop Desiderius M. Rwoma, Bishop of Bukoba and Bishop Bernardin Francis Mfumbusa Bishop of Kondoa.

In a homily that he gave on 16 June 2024 in Singida Diocese, Bishop Edward Elias Mapunda publicly declared his appreciation of the service provided by women Religious in the Catholic Church.

== See also ==
- Catholic Church in Tanzania

== Succession table ==
Catholic Church titles
Preceded by Desiderius M. Rwoma (Bishop: 19 April 1999 to 15 January 2013) (Apostolic Administrator: 15 January 2013 to 5 July 2015)	Bishop of Singida (since 28 April 2015)	Succeeded by Incumbent
