= Wilbroad Henry Kibozi =

Tanzanian Catholic prelate

The Most Reverend Wilbroad Henry Kibozi
- Bishop of Dodoma
- Church: Catholic Church
- Archdiocese: Roman Catholic Archdiocese of Dodoma
- See: Dodoma
- Appointed: 12 February 2024
- Installed: 12 May 2024
- Other post: Apostolic Administrator of Kondoa (since 2026)

Orders
- Ordination: 9 July 2010
- Consecration: 12 May 2024 by Beatus Kinyaiya
- Rank: Bishop

Personal details
- Born: Wilbroad Henry Kibozi; 30 April 1973 (age 53) Dodoma, Diocese of Dodoma, Dodoma Region, Tanzania

Styles of Wilbroad Henry Kibozi
- Reference style: Your Lordship; The Most Reverend
- Spoken style: His Lordship
- Religious style: Bishop

Wilbroad Henry Kibozi (born 30 April 1973) is a Tanzanian Catholic prelate who serves as Auxiliary Bishop of the Roman Catholic Diocese of Dodoma. He was appointed auxiliary bishop of Dodoma on 12 February 2024 by Pope Francis. On the same day, he was appointed Titular Bishop of Zallata.

== Background and education ==
He was born on 30 April 1973, at Dodoma, Dodoma District, Diocese of Dodoma, Tanzania. He attended primary and secondary schools in his home area. He studied philosophy at Ntungamo Major Seminary in the Catholic Diocese of Bukoba. He then studied Theology at Kipalapala Major Seminary in Tabora Archdiocese. From 2017 until 2019, he studied in Italy. He graduated from the Theological Faculty of Central Italy, in Florence with both a Licentiate and Doctorate in Dogmatic Theology.

== Priesthood ==
He was ordained a deacon in 2009 at Kiwanja Ndege Parish, in Dodoma. He was ordained a priest of the diocese of Dodoma 9 July 2010.

As priest he served in various roles inside and outside of his diocese including as:

- Formator at Miyuji Junior Seminary, in Dodoma for about two years, starting on 9 July 2010.
- Confessor in the House of Formation in Livorno, from 2017 until 2020.
- Lecturer at Jordan University College in Morogoro Diocese from 2019 until 2020.
- Assistant to the parish administrator, of Saints Kosma and Damiano Parish in Kahama
- Vice Rector at the Holy Family Mwendakulima Major Seminary in Kahama, Tanzania.

== As bishop ==
He was appointed Auxiliary Bishop of the Roman Catholic Diocese of Dodoma, Tanzania on 12 February 2024. On the same day he was concurrently appointed Titular Bishop of Zallata. He was consecrated and installed outside the Pilgrimage Center, at Miyuji Mbwanga in the Archdiocese of Dodoma on 12 May 2024. The Principal Consecrator was Archbishop Beatus Kinyaiya, Archbishop of Dodoma assisted by Archbishop Jude Thaddaeus Ruwa'ichi, Archbishop of Dar-es-Salaam and Archbishop Gervas John Mwasikwabhila Nyaisonga, Archbishop of Mbeya.

Since 22 April 2026 he also has served as an Apostolic Administrator of the Diocese of Kondoa.

== See also ==
- Catholic Church in Tanzania

== Succession table ==
Catholic Church titles
Preceded by (Before 12 February 2024)	Auxiliary Bishop of Dodoma (Since 12 February 2024)	Succeeded by Incumbent
