= Maranta =

Maranta can refer to:

- The Marantaceae family of "prayer plants", including arrowroot
- Maranta (plant), a genus within that family

Maranta as a personal name may refer to:

- In author citation (botany), Maranta is Bartolomeo Maranta, the 16th century botanist for whom the Marantaceae are named and also a literary theorist
- Barry Maranta, Australian sports administrator
- Lachlan Maranta (born 1992), Australian Rugby League player, Grandson of Barry Maranta
- Edgar Aristide Maranta (1897–1975), Swiss-born archbishop of Zanzibar
- Maranta, a character in the Dragonlance series; see List of minor Dragonlance characters#Kang's Regiment
