= Diocese of Zanzibar =

The Diocese of Zanzibar may refer to:

- Anglican Diocese of Zanzibar, in Zanzibar
- Roman Catholic Diocese of Zanzibar, in Zanzibar
