= Morogo (disambiguation) =

Morogo is an African leafy vegetable.

Morogo may also refer to:

- William Morogo arap Saina, a Kenyan politician and MP for the Eldoret North Constituency
- Morogo, a character from the 1989 film Cheetah

== See also ==
- Morogoro, Tanzania
