= Dennis Vincent Durning =

American Catholic missionary and prelate (1923–2002)

The Most Reverend Dennis Durning C.S.S.p
- Bishop Emeritus of Arusha
- Church: Catholic
- Province: Arusha
- Diocese: Arusha
- See: Arusha
- Appointed: March 1, 1963
- In office: May 28, 1963 ‍–‍ March 6, 1989
- Retired: March 6, 1989
- Successor: Fortunatus Lukanima
- Previous posts: Assistant Parish Priest of Mashati Parish; Parish Priest of Mashati Parish

Orders
- Ordination: June 3, 1949
- Consecration: May 28, 1963 by John Joseph Krol

Personal details
- Born: Dennis Vicent Durning; May 18, 1923 Germantown, Philadelphia, Pennsylvania, U.S.
- Died: February 21, 2002 (aged 78) Kilimanjaro, Tanzania
- Buried: Holy Ghost Fathers Cemetery, Usa River, Arusha
- Denomination: Christianity
- Residence: Arusha
- Occupation: Missionary
- Motto: In Pascuis Uberrimis Pascam Eas (Latin for 'I Will Feed You In Good Grazing')

Dennis Durning C.S.Sp. (May 18, 1923 – February 21, 2002) was an American, Catholic Bishop and Holy Ghost Father, a member of Congregation of the Holy Ghost under the Immaculate Heart of Mary, also Spiritans (C.S.Sp.), who served as a bishop of Arusha from 1963 until his resignation in 1989.

== Life ==
Bishop Dennis Durning (C.S.S.P) was born on May 18, 1923, in Germantown, Philadelphia, Pennsylvania, United States and died on February 21, 2002, in KCMC hospital, Kilimanjaro, Tanzania. He was buried in Holy Ghost Fathers Cemetery, Usa River seminary.

== Priesthood ==
Dennis Durning graduated the secondary education and decided to join the Congregation of the holy Ghost. He took first vows in the Congregation of the Holy Ghost in July, 1944 and was ordained to the Priesthood on June 3, 1949. He was assigned as a missionary to the Province of Kilimanjaro, Tanzania in 1950, where he served as a missionary until being named Bishop of the Diocese of Arusha, Tanzania. He served as an assistant parish priest of Mashati Parish in Rombo from 1950 to 1954, and Parish Priest (pastor) of Same parish from 1954 until 1956.

== Episcopacy ==
In 1963, Pope John XXIII created the Diocese of Arusha and appointed Dennis Durning C.S.Sp as his first Bishop on 1 March 1963. He was consecrated Bishop in Saints Peter and Paul Cathedral, Philadelphia, by Most Rev. Archbishop John Joseph Krol of Philadelphia on May 28, 1963. He served as Bishop of Arusha from May 28, 1963, until his resignation on March 6, 1989. He was succeeded by Bishop Fortunatus Lukanima During his episcopacy, He started with four 4 parishes, one local diocesan priest (The late Fr Simon Sirikwa), 12 Holy Ghost Fathers (Spiritans Missionaries) and 4 Precious Blood Sisters. The number of Catholics in the diocese increased six(6) fold, and local diocesan clergymen increased from one priest to twenty two (22) priests.

He participated in the Second Vatican council (Vatican II) sessions II, III and IV as Council Father. On March 6, 1989, he resigned and retired. After retirement he lived in the parish of the Holy Spirit in the village of Bashai-Lambo, Diocese of Mbulu where continued with missionary service until He died on February 21, 2002, at KCMC Hospital, Moshi, Kilimanjaro. He was buried in the Holy Ghost Fathers Cemetery Usa River Arusha. Later, his body was moved and buried in the St. Theresa of Child Jesus Cathedral in Arusha.
