= Patrick Winters =

Irish Roman Catholic bishop (1908-1994)

Patrick Winters S.A.C.
- Bishop of Mbulu
- Church: Catholic Church
- Diocese: Diocese of Mbulu
- In office: 29 January 1944 – 3 July 1971
- Predecessor: Prefecture established
- Successor: Nicodemus Atle Basili Hhando
- Previous post: Titular Bishop of Burca (1952-1953)

Orders
- Ordination: 5 July 1938
- Consecration: 4 May 1952 by Jeremiah Kinane

Personal details
- Born: 8 October 1908 Ramore (northwest of Killimor), County Galway, United Kingdom of Great Britain and Ireland
- Died: 1 April 1994 (aged 85) Thurles, North Tipperary, Republic of Ireland

The Rev. Patrick Winters S.A.C. (8 October 1908 – 1 April 1994) was an Irish born Pallottine priest, who served as Bishop of the Roman Catholic Diocese of Mbulu in Tanzania, from 1953 until in 1971.

Patrick Winters was born at Ramore, Killimor, Co. Galway, he was educated at St. Joseph's College, Garbally Park, Ballinasloe. After working for four years, Winters entered the Pallottine College in Thurles to train as a priest. While in Thurles he would have studied philosophy at St. Patrick's College, Thurles. Winters moved to Rome to study theology at the Gregorian University between 1935 and 1939 and was ordained priest on 3 July 1938 and obtained his Licentiate in Sacred Theology in 1939.

Upon his retirement he moved back to Ireland and served as a priest. His latter life was spent in the Pallottine College in Thurles where he died on 1 April (Good Friday) in 1994 and is buried in the Pallottine Community Cemetery, St. Mary's, Cabra, Thurles.
