= Fortunatus M. Lukanima =

African Roman Catholic bishop

- Bishop of Arusha
- Church: Catholic Church
- Diocese: Diocese of Arusha
- In office: 6 March 1989 – 20 July 1998
- Predecessor: Dennis Vincent Durning
- Successor: Josaphat Louis Lebulu

Orders
- Ordination: 8 December 1968
- Consecration: 13 August 1989 by Laurean Rugambwa

Personal details
- Born: 8 December 1940
- Died: 12 March 2014 (aged 73)

Fortunatus M. Lukanima (8 December 1940 – 12 March 2014) was a Roman Catholic bishop.

Ordained to the priesthood in 1968, Lukanima was appointed bishop of what is now the Roman Catholic Archdiocese of Arusha, Tanzania in 1989. He resigned in 1998.
