= Prosper Balthazar Lyimo =

Tanzanian Catholic prelate (born 1964)

The Most Reverend Prosper Balthazar Lyimo
- Bishop of Bariadi, Tanzania
- Bishop Lyimo in 2026
- Church: Catholic Church
- Archdiocese: Roman Catholic Archdiocese of Mwanza
- See: Diocese of Bariadi
- Appointed: 8 January 2026
- Predecessor: None (Diocese created)
- Previous posts: Auxiliary Bishop of Arusha Archdiocese (11 November 2014 until 8 January 2026)

Orders
- Ordination: 4 July 1997
- Consecration: 15 February 2015 by Josaphat Louis Lebulu

Personal details
- Born: Prosper Balthazar Lyimo; 20 August 1964 (age 62) Kyou, Kilema Municipality, Moshi District, Kilimanjaro Region, Diocese of Moshi, Tanzania

Styles of Prosper Balthazar Lyimo
- Reference style: Your Lordship; The Most Reverend
- Spoken style: His Lordship
- Religious style: Bishop

Prosper Balthazar Lyimo (born 20 August 1964) is a Tanzanian Catholic prelate who was appointed as bishop of the Roman Catholic Diocese of Bariadi, in Tanzania on 8 January 2026. The Catholic See was created that same day and is a suffragan of the Ecclasiastical Metropolitan Province of Mwanza. Before that, he was auxiliary bishop in the Roman Catholic Archdiocese of Arusha from 11 November 2014 until 8 January 2026. He was appointed bishop on 11 November 2014 by Pope Francis. He was consecrated at Arusha on 15 February 2015 by Josaphat Louis Lebulu, Archbishop of Arusha. He concurrently served as Titular Bishop of Vanariona, while auxiliary bishop. Pope Leo XIV created the Diocese of Bariadi, Tanzania on 8 January 2026. That same day, he appointed Bishop Prosper Balthazar Lyimo as the pioneer bishop of that new Catholic diocese.

== Background and education ==
He was born on 20 August 1964, in Kyou Village, Kilema Municipality, Moshi District, Diocese of Moshi, Kilimanjaro Region, in Tanzania. He attended primary school in Ngurdoto, in the Arusha Region. He then studied at the Saint Thomas Aquinas Minor Seminary in Arusha. He studied philosophy at Our Lady of Angels Seminary in Kibosho, in the Diocese of Moshi. He then studied theology at the Saint Paul Major Seminary in Kipalapala, near Tabora. He holds a Licentiate in canon law awarded in 2007, by the Pontifical Urban University in Rome. His Doctorate in canon law was awarded in 2011 by the Saint Paul University in Ottawa, Canada.

== Priest ==
He was ordained a priest for the Archdiocese of Arusha on 4 July 1997. He served as a priest until 11 November 2014. While a priest, he served in various roles and locations, including:

- Formator in the Saint Thomas Aquinas Minor Seminary of Arusha, in Oldonyosambu from 1997 until 1999.
- Chancellor of the Archdiocese of Arusha from 2000 until 2004.
- Studies in Rome, Italy, leading to the award of a licentiate in canon law, awarded by the Pontifical Urban University from 2004 until 2007.
- Chancellor of the Archdiocese of Arusha from 2007 until 2008.
- Studies in Ottawa, Canada leading to the award of a doctorate in canon law from Saint Paul University, Ottawa, Canada in 2011, having studied there since 2008.
- Chancellor and judicial vicar of the archdiocese from 2011 until 2014.

== Bishop ==
On 11 November 2014, Pope Francis appointed him as titular bishop of Vanariona and auxiliary bishop in Arusha. He was consecrated at Arusha on 15 February 2015 by Josaphat Louis Lebulu, Archbishop of Arusha assisted by Francisco Montecillo Padilla, Titular Archbishop of Nebbio, the Apostolic Nuncio in Tanzania and Isaac Amani Massawe, Bishop of Moshi.

On 8 January 2026, Pope Leo XIV, created the Diocese of Bariadi, Tanzania by taking territory from the Diocese of Shinyanga. The Holy Father appointed Bishop Prosper Balthazar Lyimo, previously auxiliary bishop at Arusha to be the pioneer bishop of this new Catholic See. The new Catholic diocese is a suffragan of the Archdiocese of Mwanza.

== Succession table ==
Catholic Church titles
Preceded by	Auxiliary Bishop of Arusha (11 November 2014 - 8 January 2026)	Succeeded by
Preceded by None (Diocese created)	Bishop of Bariadi (since 8 January 2026)	Succeeded by (Incumbent)
