= Haubi =

Ward in Kondoa, Dodoma, Tanzania

Coordinates: 4°48′S 35°58′E

Haubi is an administrative ward in the Kondoa district of the Dodoma Region of Tanzania. According to the 2002 census, the ward has a total population of 12,894.

Haubi is a little village less than 1 km (0.62 mi) from Haubi Catholic Mission Station. There is no public water or electricity there. The lake Haubi has been investigated as a natural historical archive. It contains for instance sediments from the Haubi badlands.

== Notable people ==
- Adelaida K. Semesi (1951–2001), marine scientist and mangrove ecologist
- Matthias Joseph Isuja (14 August 1929 - 13 April 2016), Bishop Emeritus of Dodoma, Tanzania was born here in 1929.
