= Adelaida K. Semesi =

Tanzanian ecologist (1951–2001)

- Adelaida K. Semesi
- Born: Adelaida Kleti Semesi; 1951; Haubi, Kondoa District, Tanganyika Territory
- Died: 6 February 2001 (aged 49–50); Dar es Salaam, Tanzania
- Education: University of Dar es Salaam
- Known for: Mangrove ecology
- Scientific career
- Fields: Marine biology
- Workplaces: University of Dar es Salaam

Adelaida Kleti Semesi (1951 – 6 February 2001) was a Tanzanian ecologist, who was Professor of Marine Biology at the University of Dar es Salaam. Known for her work on mangrove ecology, Semesi was the first woman to be a professor in the field of natural sciences in Tanzania.

== Education ==
Semesi was born in 1951 in Haubi, Tanzania. She graduated from the University of Dar es Salaam with a BSc in 1975, followed by a PhD from the same institution in 1979.

== Career ==
Semesi's teaching career began in 1975 as teaching assistant, rising to professor by the time of her death. In 1982 she began a programme of research into seaweed cultivation in Zanzibar; its application resulted in greater investment in the industry providing a wider range of employment, especially for women. Her work on mangrove ecology began in 1990, which resulted in Tanzania being one of the first countries to have an environmental management plan for mangroves. She was also an advocate for orally transmitted indigenous scientific knowledge, and its practice within communities, especially relating to agricultural practices.

Nicknamed mama mikoko ("mama mangroves" in Swahili), she specialised in mangrove ecology, she was a Council Member for the International Society for Mangrove Ecosystems, a Council Member for the International Seaweed Association, and a member of the board of trustees for the Western Indian Ocean Marine Science Association.

Semesi was Tanzania's first female professor in the field of natural sciences. Despite wider discrimination against women in science, she was recognised with international awards. These included a Fulbright Scholarship to the University of South Florida in 1982, where she undertook a research project entitled "Analysis of Certain Marine Phycocolloids". She was the recipient in 1992 of a Pew Trust Fellowship, which she used to undertake a major study on the Bagamoyo area, incorporating marine sources, socio-economic statistics and other factors.

At the time of her death, Semesi was Director of the Institute of Marine Sciences of the University of Dar es Salaam. She died on 6 February 2001. Her death was described in Pwani Yetu: The Newsletter of the Tanzania Coastal Management Partnership as a "great misfortune for marine conservation".

== Recognition ==
- Fulbright Scholarship
- Pew Trust Fellowship in Marine Science
- Agricultural University of Norway: Noragric Publication Award (1999), for excellence in research publications
- Marine Plants of Tanzania: A field guide to the seaweeds and seagrasses of Tanzania by Eurico C. Oliveira, Katrin Österlund and Matern S. P. Mtolera was dedicated to Semesi's life and work.

== Personal life ==
Semesi was married with four children.

== Selected publications ==
- Collen, J., M. Mtolera, K. Abrahamsson, A. Semesi and M. Pedersen. 1995. Farming and physiology of the red algae Eucheuma: Growing commercial importance in East Africa. Ambio 24(7): 497-450
- Mtolera, M.S.P., J. Collen and A.K. Semesi. 1995. Destructive hydrogen peroxide production in Eucheuma denticulatum (Rhodophyta) during stress caused by elevated pH, high light intensities and competition with other species. olera, M.S.P., J. Collen and A.K. Semesi. 1995. Destructive hydrogen peroxide production in Eucheuma denticulatum 30(4): 289
- Semesi A.K. 1993. Wetlands of sub-saharan Africa, their relevance and management. Proceedings of the conference on water and environment: Key to Africa's Development 151-164
- Engdahl, S., F. Mamboya, M. Mtolera, A. Semesi and M. Björk. 1998. The brown macroalgae Pakina boergesenii as an indicator of heavy metal contamination in the Zanzibar Channel. Ambio 27(8): 694-700
- Semesi, A.K. 1998. Coastal resources utilization and conservation issues in Bagamoyo, Tanzania. Ambio 27(8): 635-644
- Semesi, A.K. 1998. Mangrove management and utilization in Eastern Africa. Ambio 27(8): 620-626
- Mtolera, M.S.P., J. Collen and A.K. Semesi. 1996. Stressed-induced production of volatile halogenated organic compounds in Eucheuma denticulatum (Rhodophyta) caused by elevated pH and high light intensities. European Journal of Phycology 31(1): 91
- Bjork, M., S.M. Mohammed and A. Semesi. 1995. Coralline algae, important coral-reef builders threatened by pollution. Ambio 24(7): 502
