= Diocese of Same =

Diocese in Same, Arusha, Tanzania

Coordinates: 3.3725°S 36.694444°E

Diocese of Same Dioecesis Samensis Jimbo Katoliki Same

Location
- Country: Tanzania
- Territory: Same
- Ecclesiastical province: Roman Catholic Archdiocese of Arusha
- Metropolitan: Arusha
- Headquarters: Christ the Good Shepherd Cathedral, Same, Tanzania
- Coordinates: -4.0664375, 37.7369375

Statistics
- Area: 10,800 km^{2} (4,200 sq mi)
- Population: Total; Catholics: (as of 2004); 562,950; 70,490 (12.5%)
- Parishes: 32
- Churches: 100
- Congregations: 11
- Members: 80,000

Information
- Denomination: Catholic
- Sui iuris church: Latin Church
- Rite: Roman Rite
- Established: 10 December 1963
- Cathedral: Christ the Good Shepherd Cathedral
- Patron saint: Christ the Good Shepherd
- Secular priests: 73(Diocesan); 7(Religious); 7(Diocese of Mangalore)
- Language: Swahili, Pare

Current leadership
- Pope: Leo XIV
- Bishop: Rogatus Kimaryo C.S.Sp.
- Vicar General: Reverend Father Wilhard Mpombengwa
- Bishops emeritus: Jacob Venance Koda

The Roman Catholic Diocese of Same (Latin: Dioecesis Samensis) is a diocese located in the Same District in the ecclesiastical province of Arusha in Tanzania.

== History ==
- 10 December 1963: Established as Apostolic Prefecture of Same from the Diocese of Moshi
- 3 February 1977: Promoted as Diocese of Same

== History of Catholic Diocese of Same ==
The Catholic Diocese of Same extends over two Districts of SAME and MWANGA. It is situated in the North-eastern part of Tanzania, south of Mount Kilimanjaro. A large part of the Diocese is surrounded by Pare Mountains. These mountains are densely populated, inhabited mostly by small scale farmers (mainly the Pare people), whereas, the surrounding plains are inhabited by pastoralists (mainly the Maasai people). The plains are very dry and semi-arid, thus, a severe lack of water is a common phenomenon in Same and Mwanga. The population of the two Government Districts is 401,249 people of which about 31,000 people are Catholics. The Diocese covers 10,800 sq. km. and has twenty nine (29) Parishes and fifty 68 Outstations. A big fraction of the population in the Districts of Same and Mwanga is composed of other Christian denominations such as Lutherans, Seventh-day Adventist and Pentecostal groups. The followers of African traditional religions make up 20% and Moslems are about 25% of the population.

The vision and mission of the diocese dates back to the first Diocesan Synod in 1987–91 which came up with a philosophy of "integral development" of the people, by giving attention to both the spiritual and material well being of the Diocese and the social milieu where the people live. Thus, the Diocese embarked on setting up structures which would facilitate its pastoral and developmental net-work operational and implantable, regardless of race, colour, tribe or religion. In fact that is how the idea of the Pastoral and Development center came into being. In 2010 we revisited our Vision during our strategic Planning and we drew up a new Vision and Mission in the content of "New Heart, new Spirit" and "A family of God guided by Gospel values committed to sustainable Pastoral and social economic Development in the light of "New heart and new Spirit".

== Location ==
The Diocesan headquarters are located in Same Township. The town is located approximately 115 kilometers from Mount Kilimanjaro, the highest mountain in African Continent. It is situated along Arusha- Dar-es-Salaam road approximately 280 km from Arusha and 600 km from Dar-es-Salaam, the Commercial Capital of Tanzania.

== Background Information ==
The Diocese of Same started as a Prefecture of Same on 10 December 1963 under the leadership of Very Reverend Monsignor Henry Winkelmolen, C.S.Sp.. On 3 February 1977 the Prefecture of Same was raised to the level of a Diocese still under Monsignor Henry Winkelmolen up to 1979.

On 13 June 1979 the Right Reverend Josaphat Louis Lebulu (currently the Archbishop Emeritus of Arusha), was consecrated as the first Bishop of Diocese of Same, serving until 1999. He was succeeded by Bishop Jacob Venance Koda, (now the Bishop Emeritus) who was consecrated in 1999 as the second Bishop of Diocese of Same, serving until 2010. On 1 June 2009 Reverend Father Rogatus Kimaryo CSSp. was appointed as the Apostolic Administrator of Diocese of Same and on 30 April 2010 was appointed as the Bishop of Diocese of Same. He was consecrated on 13 June 2010 as the third Bishop of Diocese of Same.

The Diocese has 84 Priests: 73 are Diocesan Priests, 7 are Religious Missionary Priests, 4 Diocesan Priests of Diocese of Mangalore – India, 17 Religious Brothers, 148 Religious Sisters and 140 Catechists. However, not all the Priests live and work in the Diocese. Some of them are working in the Tanzania Episcopal Conference Institutions, namely, teaching in the Inter-Diocesan Major Seminaries and St. Augustine University of Tanzania. Likewise, some of them are studying in Rome. We have 30 parishes most of which are served by one Priest living alone. The parishes are very small apart from 5. There are 68 Outstations, 5 of which could be raised to the status of parishes.

From the beginning of this Diocese, the Diocesan pastoral efforts were well directed towards the formation of Church Personnel. This was realized through the setting up of a Mixed Minor Seminary of boys and girls, the foundation of initial formation houses for both Religious Brothers and Sisters, the formation of Catechists and the setting up of the corresponding infrastructures.

== Political / Economic situation ==
Tanzania enjoys political stability unlike her neighboring surrounding countries. She is one of the few countries in Africa that has managed to attain the national unity. Therefore, the political situation of Tanzania is conducive to development and pastoral programs of the Church.

A big percentage of our people are peasants and cattle keepers who depend totally on their meager income.

== Present Diocesan situation ==
The Catholic Diocese of Same has already celebrated its Centenary Jubilee (100 years), since the Holy Ghost Fathers began the work of Evangelization as Missionaries in the Diocese in the Year 1909. However, due to financial crisis and lack of readiness for this important event, the celebrations were postponed. In the month of 13 June 2010, we had two big events; the Diocese celebrated the Centenary Jubilee combined with my Episcopate Consecration as the New Bishop of SAME Diocese. In order to continue building the Mystical Body of Christ within the Diocese we prepared a Diocesan Strategic Plan to guide us. We would like to invite you to join hands with us in the work of Evangelization by supporting us either financially, materially, morally or spiritually. There is plenty to be done here. Yours in Christ

== Leadership ==
- Prefect Apostolic of Same (Roman rite)
  - Father Henry J. Winkelmolen, C.S.Sp. (3 January 1964 Appointed – 1977 Died)
- Bishops of Same (Roman rite)
  - Bishop Josaphat Louis Lebulu (12 Feb 1979 Appointed – 28 Nov 1998 Appointed, Bishop of Arusha); future Archbishop
  - Bishop Jacob Venance Koda (16 March 1999 Appointed – 15 April 2010 Resigned)
  - Bishop Rogatus Kimaryo, C.S.Sp. (30 April 2010 Appointed-)

== See also ==
- Roman Catholicism in Tanzania
