= Vanariona =

Roman Catholic diocese

File:Roman Empire - Mauretania Caesariensis (125 AD).

Vanarion (Latin: Vanarionensis) is a historic and titular diocese of the Roman Catholic Church. The seat of the bishopric was a Roman town called Vanarion, founded in the Roman province of Mauretania Caesariensis, which has been tentatively identified with ruins at Ksar-Tyr in northern Algeria. At present the Catholic bishops are titular. Between 2005 and May 13, 2013 the Bishop of Vanariony was auxiliary bishop of Katowice, Józef Kupny, he was replaced by Prosper Balthazar Lyimo of Tanzania, in 2014.

== Bishops ==
- Pelagio (fl.411) (Donatist)
- Raymond James Vonesh Joliet's auxiliary bishop in Illinois (USA) January 5, 1968 – August 16, 1991
- Filipe Neri Ferrão Auxiliary bishop Goa e Damão (India December 20, 1993 – December 12, 2003
- Józef Kupny Auxiliary bishop of Katowice December 21, 2005 – May 18, 2013
- Prosper Balthazar Lyimo Arusha auxiliary bishop (Tanzania) November 11, 2014
