= Diocese of Bagamoyo =

Roman Catholic diocese in Tanzania, Africa

Diocese of Bagamoyo Dioecesis Bagamoyensis

Location
- Country: Tanzania
- Metropolitan: Dar-es-Salaam

Statistics
- Area: 10,345 km^{2} (3,994 sq mi)
- Population: Total; Catholics: (as of 2004); 459,596; 92,345 (20.09%)

Information
- Rite: Latin Rite
- Cathedral: Immaculate Heart of Mary

Current leadership
- Pope: Leo XIV
- Bishop: Stephano Lameck Musomba

The Roman Catholic Diocese of Bagamoyo (Latin: Dioecesis Bagamoyensis) is a diocese located in the city of Bagamoyo in the ecclesiastical province of Dar-es-Salaam in Tanzania.

== History ==
- March 7, 2025: Established as Diocese of Bagamoyo from Archdiocese of Dar-es-Salaam and Diocese of Morogoro

== Leadership ==
- Bishop Stephano Lameck Musomba (2025.03.07 - present)

== See also ==
- Roman Catholicism in Tanzania
