= Edgar Aristide Maranta =

Swiss clergyman (1897-1975) Archbishop Emeritus of Dar es Salaam

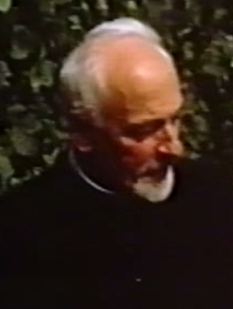

Edgar Aristide Maranta, OFMCap, commonly known as Edgar Maranta (Note: He is also identified as Edgard Aristide Maranta by some sources.) (9 January 1897 – 29 January 1975) was a Swiss prelate of the Catholic Church who spent most of his career in Dar es Salaam, 23 years as apostolic delegate from 1930 to 1953 and 15 years as archbishop.

== Biography ==
Aristide Maranta was born in Poschiavo, Switzerland, to Riccardo and Catarina (Reba) Maranta on 9 January 1897. His father was a tailor and an organist. He studied at the Capuchin colleges in Appenzell and Stans. He interrupted his studies for two years of compulsory military service.

He took "Edgar" as his Franciscan name when he formally joined the order in Lucerne in 1917 and he was ordained a priest of the Order of Friars Minor Capuchin on 6 April 1924. He did missionary work in Tanzania in 1925/26 and then devoted two years to studying school management in London. From 1928 to 1930 he established and managed a school in Kwiro, Tanzania, structured to meet the standards of the British colonial government. His work included establishing a farm to supply the school, improving road access, and using his skills as a mechanic.

On 27 March 1930, Pope Pius XI appointed him Apostolic Vicar of Dar es Salaam, making him a bishop and assigning him the titular see of Vinda. He received his episcopal consecration on 17 August 1930 from Archbishop Arthur Hinsley, who was then Apostolic Delegate for the Missions in Africa. Maranta was just 33, and he is thought by some to have been the youngest bishop in the world. Within a decade he increased the number of mission stations from eight to seventeen and improved living conditions for their staff, with particular attention to their health. During World War II, he worked out an arrangement for exchanging staff with German Benedictines so the British authorities would not deport them. In the late 1940s he erected a seminary and expanded hospital services.

In 1941, beginning with five girls, he established the Congregation of Charity Sisters of St. Francis of Assisi in Mahenge.

Pope Pius XII named him the first archbishop of Dar es Salaam when he erected that archdiocese on 25 March 1953. On 27 December 1962, Italy named him a Grand Officer of the Order of Merit of the Italian Republic. As archbishop he aimed at establishing a "Eurocentric culture", staging large events where "well-behaved students, disciplined cadets and churchgoers dressed in European clothes accompanied his magnificent entry into the cathedral of Dar es Salaam with a long train on festive days". He opposed the creation of a Capuchin friary or novitiate in his archdiocese, believing the region needed active missionaries. (Note: A Capuchin novitiate was only established in Kasita in 1961.)

Maranta attended all four sessions of the Second Vatican Council. Following the Council he led the Tanzania Episcopal Conference. He was given the additional responsibilities of the Apostolic Administrator of Zanzibar and Pemba from 12 December 1964 to 9 May 1966.

Following the achievement of independence by former European colonies and the creation of Tanzania, Maranta offered his resignation to allow for the appointment of an indigenous archbishop. Pope Paul VI accepted him resignation on 19 December 1968, assigning him the titular see of Castrum. In retirement he lived in Switzerland with his brother, who was a pastor in San Vittore. Maranta was succeeded a year later by Laurean Rugambwa, who had become the first native African cardinal in 1960.

He died at the age of 78 on 29 January 1975 in Sursee, Switzerland.

Archbishop Edgar Maranta Hall in the Msimbazi area of Dar es Salaam is named for him, as is the Edgar Maranta Nursing School.
