= Roman Catholic Diocese of Zanzibar =

Latin Catholic territory in Tanzania

Coordinates: 6.1628°S 39.1888°E

Diocese of Zanzibar Dioecesis Zanzibarensis

Location
- Country: Tanzania
- Ecclesiastical province: Dar-es-Salaam

Statistics
- Area: 2,332 km^{2} (900 sq mi)
- Population: Total; Catholics: (as of 2004); 990,900; 9,900 (1.0%)

Information
- Sui iuris church: Latin Church
- Rite: Roman Rite

Current leadership
- Pope: Leo XIV
- Bishop: Augustine Ndeliakyama Shao, C.S.Sp.

The Diocese of Zanzibar (Latin: Dioecesis Zanzibarensis) is a Latin Church ecclesiastical jurisdiction or diocese of the Catholic Church. It is a suffragan in the ecclesiastical province of the metropolitan Archdiocese of Dar-es-Salaam.

The diocese’s cathedral is St. Joseph's Cathedral located in the episcopal see of Zanzibar.

== History ==
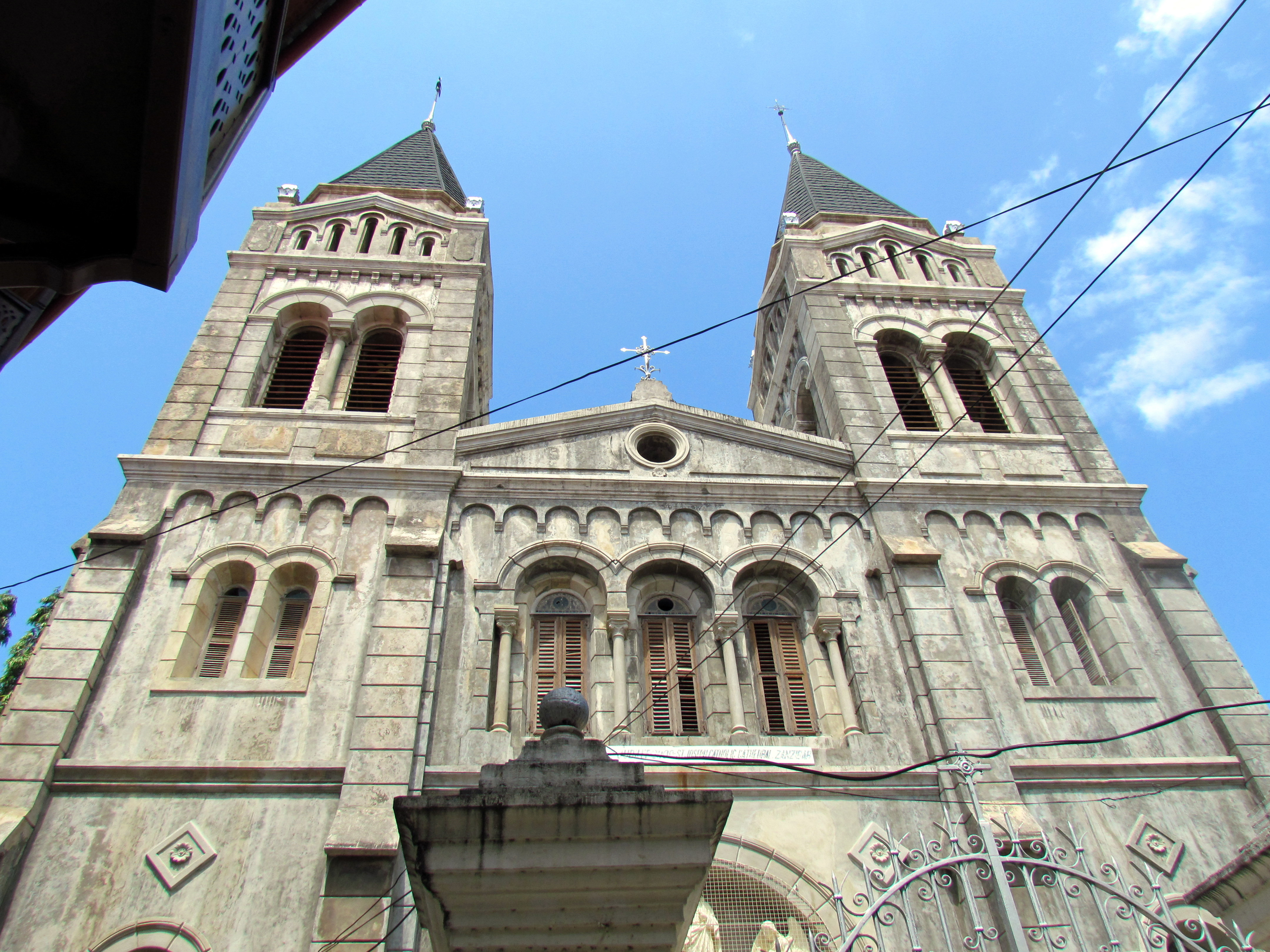
St. Joseph's Cathedral in Zanzibar

- Established 1860 as Apostolic Prefecture of Zanguebar, on vast East African territory split off from the Diocese of Saint-Denis-de-La Réunion in Réunion
- 1883: Promoted as Apostolic Vicariate of Zanguebar, hence entitled to a titular bishop
- November 16, 1887: Renamed as Apostolic Vicariate of Northern Zanguebar, having lost territory to establish the Apostolic Prefecture of Southern Zanguebar
- Lost territories repeatedly : in 1904 to establish the Apostolic Prefecture of Benadir, on 1905.09.14 to establish the Mission sui juris of Kenya and on 1906.05.11 to establish the Apostolic Vicariate of Central Zanguebar
- Renamed in 1906 as Apostolic Vicariate of Zanzibar
- Suppressed on 1953.03.25, its territory being used to establish the Metropolitan Archdiocese of Nairobi
- Restored but demoted on December 12, 1964 and renamed as Apostolic Administration of Zanzibar and Pemba
- Promoted on 1980.03.28 as Diocese of Zanzibar

== Ordinaries ==
Apostolic Prefects of Zanguebar

- Armand-René Maupoint (1862 – 1871.07.10), while Bishop of mother diocese (Saint-Denis-de-) La Réunion (Réunion) ([1857.02.14] 1857.03.19 – 1871.07.10)
- Antoine Hormer, C.S.Sp. (1868 – 1877)
- Jean-Marie-Raoul Le Bas de Courmont, C.S.Sp. (1883.10.27 – 1883.11.23)

Apostolic Vicars of Zanguebar

- Jean-Marie-Raoul Le Bas de Courmont, C.S.Sp. (1883.11.23 – 1887), Titular Bishop of Bodona (1883.11.23 – 1925.02.20)

Apostolic Vicars of Northern Zanguebar

- Jean-Marie-Raoul Le Bas de Courmont, C.S.Sp. (1887 – 1896.11.27)
- Emile-Auguste Allgeyer, C.S.Sp. (1897.02.17 – 1906.12.21), Titular Bishop of Ticelia (1897.02.17 – 1924.04.09)

Apostolic Vicars of Zanzibar

- Emile-Auguste Allgeyer, C.S.Sp. (1906.12.21 – 1913.04.03)
- John Gerald Neville, C.S.Sp. (1913.09.01 – 1930.03.08), Titular Bishop of Carrhae (1913.09.01 – 1943.02.27)
  - Apostolic Administrator the same John Gerald Neville, C.S.Sp. (1930.03.08 – 1943.02.27)
- John William Heffernan, C.S.Sp. (1932.03.15 – 1946), Titular Bishop of Uzippari (1932.03.15 – 1966.03.20)
- John Joseph McCarthy, C.S.Sp. (1946.07.11 – 1953.03.25), Titular Bishop of Cercina (1946.07.11 – 1953.03.25), later Metropolitan Archbishop of Nairobi (Kenya) (1953.03.25 – 1971.10.24), President of Kenya Conference of Catholic Bishops (1969 – 1970)

Suppressed (1953 - 1964)

Apostolic Administrators of Zanzibar and Pemba

- Edgar Aristide Maranta, O.F.M. Cap. (1964.12.12 – 1966), Titular Bishop of Vinda (1930.03.27 – 1953.03.25), while Metropolitan Archbishop of Dar-es-Salaam (Tanzania) (1953.03.25 – 1968.12.19)
- Joseph Sipendi (1966 – 1968), later Bishop of Moshi(Tanzania) (1968.01.11 – 1985.04.29)
- Adriani Mkoba (1968.07.16 – 1973.01.26), while Bishop of Morogoro (Tanzania) (1966.12.15 – 1992.11.06)
- Bernard Martin Ngaviliau, C.S.Sp. (1973 – 1980.03.28)

Suffragan Bishops of Zanzibar

- Bernard Ngaviliau, C.S.Sp. (1980.03.28 – 1996.11.30)
- Augustine Ndeliakyama Shao, C.S.Sp. (1996.11.30 - ...)

== See also ==
- Roman Catholicism in Tanzania

== Source and External links ==
- GCatholic.org with incumebt biography links
- Catholic Hierarchy
