= Diocese of Singida =

Roman Catholic diocese in Tanzania, Africa

Coordinates: 5.5°S 34.5°E

Diocese of Singida Dioecesis Singidaënsis

Location
- Country: Tanzania
- Metropolitan: Dodoma

Statistics
- Area: 49,341 km^{2} (19,051 sq mi)
- Population: Total; Catholics: (as of 2004); 1,205,017; 143,220 (11.9%)

Information
- Rite: Latin Rite

Current leadership
- Pope: Leo XIV
- Bishop: Edward Elias Mapunda

The Roman Catholic Diocese of Singida (Latin: Dioecesis Singidaënsis) is a diocese located in Singida in the ecclesiastical province of Dodoma in Tanzania.

It was established as the Diocese of Singida from the Diocese of Dodoma, Metropolitan Archdiocese of Tabora and Diocese of Mbeya, on 25 March 1972.

== Leadership ==
- Bishops of Singida (Roman rite)
  - Bishop Bernard Mabula (March 25, 1972 – April 19, 1999)
  - Bishop Desiderius Rwoma (April 19, 1999 - January 15, 2013), appointed Bishop of Bukoba
  - Bishop Edward Elias Mapunda (28 April 2015 – present)

== See also ==
- Roman Catholicism in Tanzania
