= Roman Catholic Diocese of Bariadi =

Catholic diocese in Tanzania

Coordinates: 2°48′00″S 33°59′00″E

Diocese of Bariadi Dioecesis Bariadensis

Location
- Country: Tanzania
- Metropolitan: Mwanza

Statistics
- Area: 16,638 km^{2} (6,424 sq mi)
- Population: Total; Catholics: (as of 2026); 1,221,540; 366,000 (30.0%)

Information
- Rite: Latin Rite

Current leadership
- Pope: Leo XIV
- Bishop: Bishop Prosper Balthazar Lyimo (appointed by Pope Leo XIV on 8 January 2026)

The Roman Catholic Diocese of Bariadi (Latin: Dioecesis Bariadensis) is a diocese located in Bariadi in the ecclesiastical province of Mwanza in Tanzania.

== Location ==
The Catholic Diocese of Bariadi is located in the Simiyu Region, in northwestern Tanzania. It comprises the districts and territories of Bariadi Urbana, Bariadi, Busega, Itilima, and Meatu. The new diocese made a suffragan of the Roman Catholic Archdiocese of Mwanza.

== History ==
- 8 January 2026: Established as Roman Catholic Diocese of Bariadi from the Diocese of Shinyanga by Pope Leo XIV.

== Leadership ==
- Bishops of Bariadi (Roman rite)
  - Bishop Prosper Balthazar Lyimo (Appointed 8 January 2026)

== Cathedral ==
The temporary diocesan cathedral is the Saint John the Evangelist Cathedral in the city of Bariadi. A perment diocesan cathedral, the Saint Luke Cathedral is under construction as of January 2026.

== See also ==
- Roman Catholicism in Tanzania
