= Diocese of Mbulu =

Roman Catholic diocese in Tanzania, Africa

Coordinates: 3.85°S 35.55°E

Diocese of Mbulu Dioecesis Mbuluensis
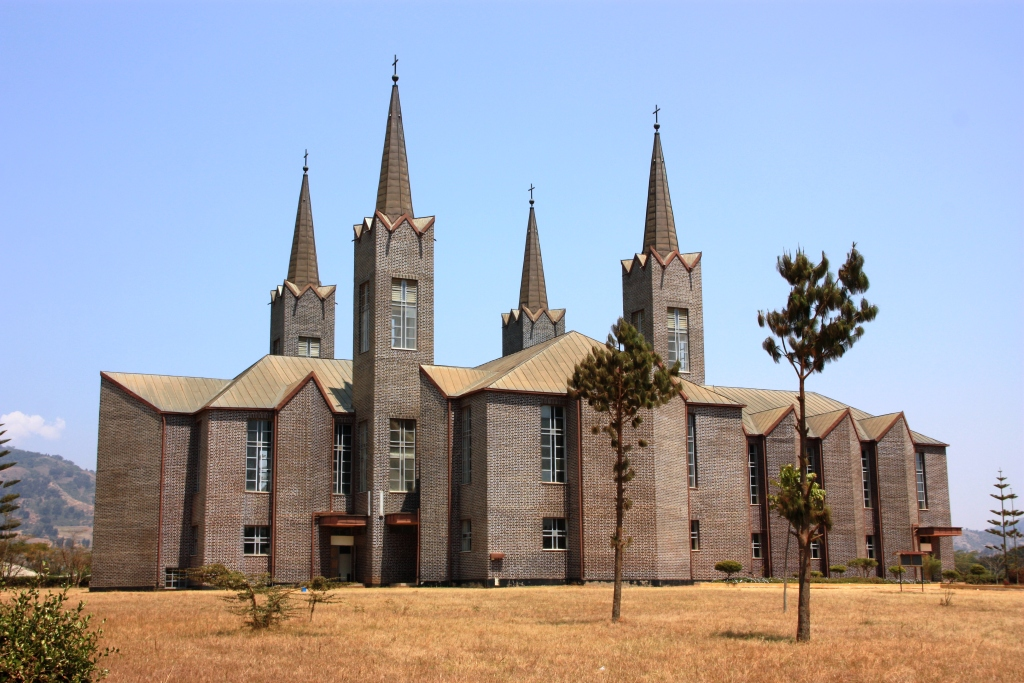

Location
- Country: Tanzania
- Metropolitan: Arusha

Statistics
- Area: 16,057 km^{2} (6,200 sq mi)
- Population: Total; Catholics: (as of 2004); 924,462; 242,698 (26.3%)

Information
- Rite: Latin Rite

Current leadership
- Pope: Leo XIV
- Bishop: Anthony Gaspar Lagwen

The Roman Catholic Diocese of Mbulu (Latin: Dioecesis Mbuluensis) is a diocese located in the town of Mbulu in the ecclesiastical province of Arusha in Tanzania. The seat of the Bishop is the Cathedral Church of the Virgin Mary. As of 2025, Catholic population has risen to make up 55%.

== History ==
- April 14, 1943: Established as Apostolic Prefecture of Mbulu from the Apostolic Prefecture of Dodoma and the Apostolic Vicariate of Kilima-Njaro
- January 10, 1952: Promoted as Apostolic Vicariate of Mbulu
- March 25, 1953: Promoted as Diocese of Mbulu

== Leadership ==
- Prefect Apostolic of Mbulu (Roman rite)
  - Fr. Patrick Winters, S.A.C. (1944.01.28 – 1952.01.10 see below)
- Vicar Apostolic of Mbulu (Roman rite)
  - Patrick Winters, S.A.C. (see above 1952.01.10 – 1953.03.25 see below)
- Bishops of Mbulu (Roman rite)
  - Patrick Winters, S.A.C. (see above 1953.03.25 – 1971.07.03)
  - Nicodemus Atle Basili Hhando (1971.07.03 – 1997.03.07)
  - Jude Thaddaeus Ruwa'ichi, O.F.M. Cap. (1999.02.09 – 2005.01.15), appointed Bishop of Dodoma
  - Beatus Kinyaiya, O.F.M. Cap. (2006.04.22 - 2014.06.11), appointed Archbishop of Dodoma
  - Anthony Gaspar Lagwen (since 2018.05.22)

== See also ==
- Roman Catholicism in Tanzania

== Sources ==
- GCatholic.org
- Catholic Hierarchy
