= Roman Catholic Diocese of Kondoa =

Roman Catholic diocese in Tanzania, Africa

Coordinates: 4.906389°S 35.779722°E

Diocese of Kondoa Dioecesis Kondoaënsis

Location
- Country: Tanzania
- Territory: Kondoa District
- Ecclesiastical province: Dodoma
- Subdivisions: 9 parishes

Statistics
- Area: 13,210 km^{2} (5,100 sq mi)
- Population: Total; Catholics: (as of 2011); 541,345; 46,067 (8.5%)

Information
- Rite: Roman Rite
- Established: March 12, 2011

Current leadership
- Pope: Leo XIV
- Bishop: sede vacante
- Apostolic Administrator: Wilbroad Henry Kibozi

The diocese of Kondoa (in Latin: Dioecesis Kondoaënsis) is a see of the Roman Catholic Church suffragan of the Archdiocese of Dodoma. In 2011 it counted 46,067 baptized among 541,345 inhabitants. Its most recent bishop was Bernardin Francis Mfumbusa.

== Territory ==
The diocese corresponds to the Kondoa District, in Tanzania.

The see is located in the city of Kondoa, since 2011 and the construction of the cathedral of the Holy Spirit.

The territory is divided into 9 parishes.

== History ==
The diocese was created on March 12, 2011 by the Papal bull Cum ad provehendam of Pope Benedict XVI, taking territories from the Roman Catholic Diocese of Dodoma.

== Chronology of the bishops ==
- (March 12, 2011–April 14, 2026) Bernardin Francis Mfumbusa
  - (since April 22, 2026) Wilbroad Henry Kibozi, Apostolic Administrator

== Statistics ==
The diocese counted 541,345 inhabitants at its creation, among whom 46,067 were baptized, which is 8.5%.

| Year | Population | | | Priests | | | | Deacons | Religious | | Parishes |
| | baptised | total | % | number | secular | regular | baptised per priest | | men | women |
| 2011 | 46.067 | 541.345 | 8,5 | 17 | 15 | 2 | 2.710 | | 0 | 87 | 9 |
