= Josaphat Louis Lebulu =

Tanzanian Catholic bishop

The Most Reverend Josaphat Lebulu
- Archbishop emeritus of Arusha
- Archdiocese: Roman Catholic Archdiocese of Arusha
- Province: Arusha
- Metropolis: Arusha
- Diocese: Arusha
- Appointed: 28 November 1998
- Installed: 28 November 1998
- Term ended: 27 December 2017
- Predecessor: Fortunatus M. Lukanima
- Successor: Isaac Amani Massawe
- Previous posts: Bishop of Same (1979–1998); President of Tanzania Episcopal Conference (1988-1994); Bishop of Arusha (28 Nov 1998 – 16 March 1999); President of Association of Member Episcopal Conferences in Eastern Africa (1997 – July 2008)

Orders
- Ordination: 11 December 1968 by Bishop Joseph Kilasara
- Consecration: 24 May 1979 by Laurean Cardinal Rugambwa

Personal details
- Born: Josaphat Louis Lebulu; 13 June 1942 (age 84) Kisangara, Mwanga, Tanzania
- Denomination: Roman Catholic

Ordination history of Josaphat Louis Lebulu
History
Priestly ordination
- Ordained by: Rt. Rev. Bp Joseph Kilasara
Episcopal consecration
- Principal consecrator: Laurean Cardinal Rugambwa, (Archbishop emeritus of Dar es Salaam)
- Co-consecrators: Mario Epifanio Abdallah Mgulunde (Bishop of Catholic Diocese of Iringa); Dennis Vincent Durning C.S.Sp. (Roman Catholic Bishop of Arusha)
Episcopal succession
Bishops consecrated by Josaphat Louis Lebulu as principal consecrator
- Prosper Balthazar Lyimo: 2015

Styles of Josaphat Louis Lebulu
- Reference style: The Most Reverend
- Spoken style: Your Grace
- Religious style: Archbishop

Josaphat Louis Lebulu (born 13 June 1942 in Kisangara) is a Catholic Archbishop Emeritus of Arusha in Tanzania.

He was ordained priest by Bishop Joseph Kilasara on 11 December 1968 in Catholic Diocese of Same. He was appointed Bishop of Same by Pope John Paul II on 12 February 1979 and received his episcopal consecration from Archbishop Laurean Rugambwa on 24 May 1979.

On 28 November 1998 Bishop Lebulu was appointed Bishop of Catholic Diocese of Arusha by Pope John Paul II and later on 16 March 1999 he was appointed the archbishop of Catholic Archdiocese of Arusha until his retirement on 27 December 2017.

He served as president of the Council of Catholic Bishops in Tanzania (Tanzania Episcopal Conference TEC)(1988-1994). He also served as President of Association of Member Episcopal Conferences in Eastern Africa (1997 – 2008).
