= Ticelia =

Ticelia was a supposed city and diocese, in Cyrenaica. The article by Siméon Vailhé in the 1912 Catholic Encyclopedia expressed perplexity about its identity or existence. The supposed bishopric is not accepted into the Catholic Church's list of titular sees.
