= Matthias Joseph Isuja =

Tanzanian Catholic prelate (1929 - 2016)

The Most Reverend Matthias Joseph Isuja
- Bishop Emeritus of Dodoma, Tanzania (Deceased)
- Church: Catholic Church
- Archdiocese: Roman Catholic Archdiocese of Dodoma
- See: Dodoma
- Appointed: 26 June 1972
- Installed: 17 September 1972
- Term ended: 15 January 2005
- Predecessor: Anthony Jeremiah Pesce
- Successor: Jude Thaddaeus Ruwa'ichi

Orders
- Ordination: 24 December 1960
- Consecration: 17 September 1972 by Laurean Cardinal Rugambwa
- Rank: Bishop

Personal details
- Born: Matthias Joseph Isuja; August 14, 1929 Haubi, Diocese of Dodoma, Dodoma Region, Tanzania
- Died: 13 April 2016 (aged 86) St. Gaspar Referral and Teaching Hospital, Itigi, Singida Region, Tanzania

Styles of Matthias Joseph Isuja
- Reference style: Your Lordship; The Most Reverend
- Spoken style: His Lordship
- Religious style: Bishop

Matthias Joseph Isuja (14 August 1929 - 13 April 2016) was a Tanzanian Roman Catholic prelate who served as the Bishop of the Roman Catholic Diocese of Dodoma from 1972 until his age-related retirement in 2005. He was appointed bishop on 26 June 1972 by Pope Paul VI. Bishop Matthias Joseph Isuja died on 13 April 2016 at the age of 87 years, as the Bishop Emeritus of Dodoma, Tanzania.

== Early life and education ==
He was born on 14 August 1929 at Haubi, Kondoa District, Diocese of Dodoma, Dodoma Region, in Tanzania. He attended various schools including Tosamanga Secondary School in Iringa Region. In 1959 he graduated from Moshi Theological College.

== Priest ==
He was ordained a priest of the diocese of Dodoma, Tanzania on 24 December 1960, at the age of 31 years. He served in that capacity until 26 June 1972.

== Bishop ==
He was appointed bishop of the Roman Catholic Diocese of Dodoma, Tanzania on 26 June 1972 by The Holy Father Paul VI. He was consecrated and installed at Dodoma on 17 September 1972 by the hands of Laurean Cardinal Rugambwa, Archbishop of Dar-es-Salaam assisted by Archbishop Marko Mihayo, Archbishop of Tabora and Bishop Adriani Mkoba, Bishop of Morogoro.

On 15 January 2005, Pope John Paul II accepted the request to retire from the pastoral care of the Roman Catholic Diocese of Dodoma, presented by Bishop Matthias Joseph Isuja, who had turned 75 years of age in August 2004. The same day, The Holly Father appointed Bishop Jude Thaddaeus Ruwa'ichi to succeed at Dodoma. Bishop Isuja stayed on as Bishop Emeritus of Dodoma.

== Illness and death ==
For a period before his death, Bishop Isuja fell ill. He was admitted to the St. Gaspar Referral and Teaching Hospital, in Itigi, Singida Region, Tanzania. He died there on 13 April 2016. He was buried on 20 April 2016, at St. Paul of the Cross Cathedral, in Dodoma. He was 87 years old.

== See also ==
- Roman Catholic Church in Tanzania

== Succession table ==
Catholic Church titles
Preceded by Anthony Jeremiah Pesce (10 May 1951 – 20 December 1971)	Bishop of Dodoma (26 June 1972 – 15 January 2005)	Succeeded by Jude Thaddaeus Ruwa'ichi
