= Ulenje =

Ward of Mbeya Region, Tanzania

- Ward
- Location within Tanzania
- Coordinates: 8°56′S 33°41′E
- Country: Tanzania
- Region: Mbeya Region
- District: Mbeya District
- Ward: Ulenje

Government
  - Type: Council

Population (2016)
  - Total: 7,655
- Time zone: UTC+3 (EAT)
- Postcode: 53204
- Area code: 025
- Website: District Website

Ulenje is an administrative ward in the Mbeya Rural district of the Mbeya Region of Tanzania. In 2016 the Tanzania National Bureau of Statistics report there were 7,655 people in the ward, from 6,946 in 2012.

== Villages and hamlets ==
The ward has 6 villages, and 8 hamlets.

- Ihango
  - Ihango
  - Ilembo
  - Malonji
  - Togwa
- Itala
  - Ibula
  - Igwila
  - Itala A
  - Itala B
  - Itandu A
  - Itandu B
  - Kagera
  - Majengo
  - Nyeta A
  - Nyeta B
- Mbonile
  - Ilala
  - Kalaja
  - Kamficheni
  - Mwakibete
  - Nyakonde
  - Tegela
  - Togwa
- Mkuyuni
  - Igala
  - Mdwadwa
  - Mkuyuni
  - Natela
  - Wanging'ombe
- Ulenje
  - Barazani
  - Ikeka A
  - Ikeka B
  - Imaji
  - Isyonje
  - Kiwanjani
  - Magharibi A
  - Magharibi B
  - Makabichi
  - Mansamu
- Wambishe
  - Hafurwe
  - Ikulila A
  - Ikulila B
  - Ikulila C
  - Magoye
  - Nsonya
  - Shipinga
  - Wambishe
