= Mwanga, Tanzania =

Mwanga
- Town
- Location in Tanzania
- Coordinates: 03°39′43″S 37°34′41″E
- Country: Tanzania
- Region: Kilimanjaro Region
- District: Mwanga District

Population (2022 census)
  - Total: 21,000
- Time zone: GMT + 3

Mwanga is a town in northern Tanzania at the foot of the north Pare Mountains. It is the district capital of Mwanga District.

== Transport ==
Paved Trunk road T2 from Dar es Salaam to Arusha passes through the town.

The Usambara Railway from Tanga to Arusha passes through Mwanga as well.

== Population ==
According to the 2012 national census the population of Mwanga town (Mwanga Ward) was 15,783.
