= Archdiocese of Dar-es-Salaam =

Roman Catholic archdiocese in Tanzania, Africa

Coordinates: 6.8000°S 39.2833°E

Archdiocese of Dar-es-Salaam Archidioecesis Dar-es-Salaam
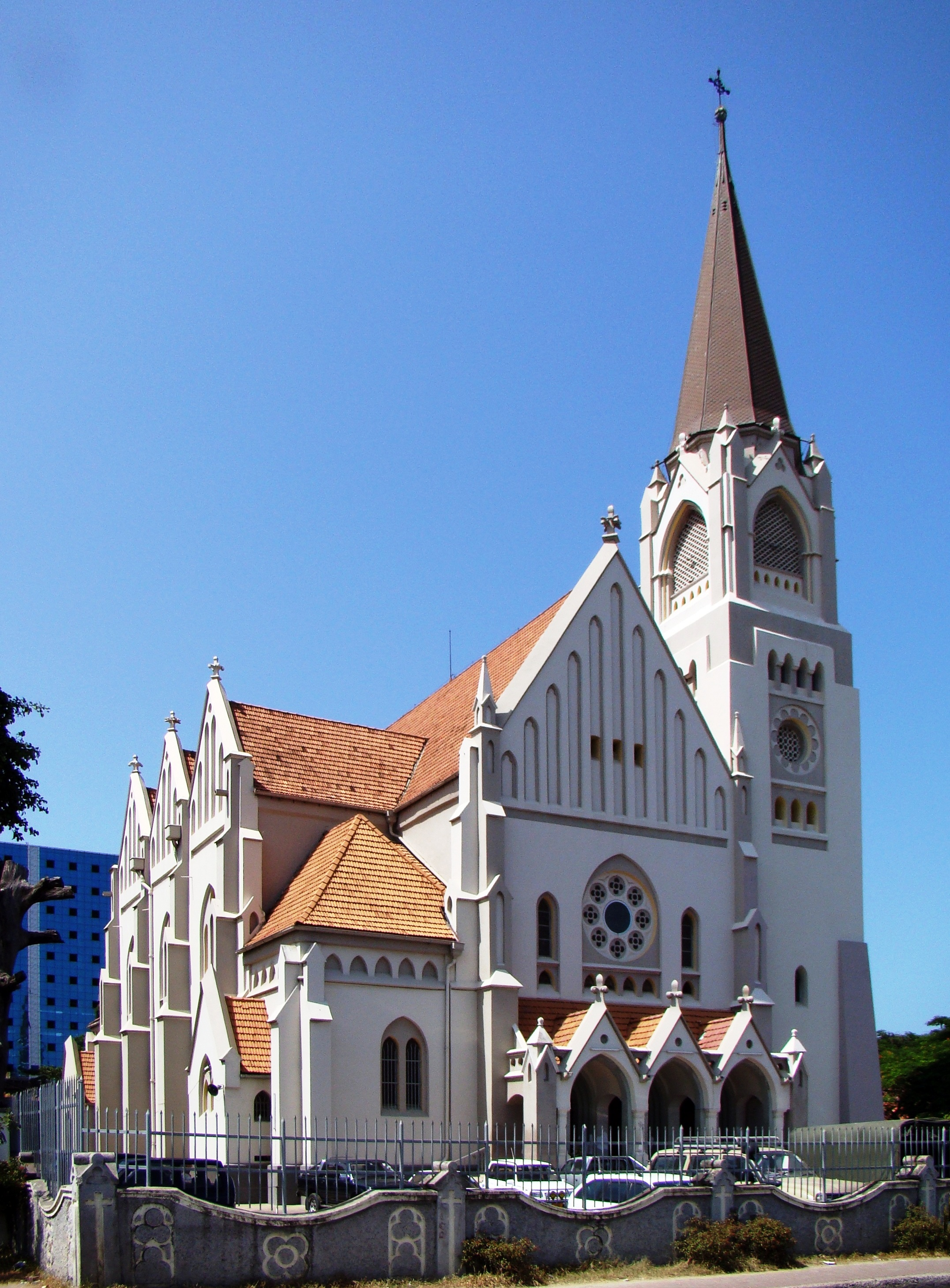
- St Joseph's Cathedral

Location
- Country: Tanzania
- Territory: Dar-es-Salaam

Information
- Denomination: Catholic
- Sui iuris church: Latin Church
- Rite: Roman Rite
- Established: November 16, 1897
- Cathedral: St. Joseph's Cathedral
- Patron saint: Saint Joseph the Worker

Current leadership
- Pope: Leo XIV
- Archbishop: Jude Thaddaeus Ruwa'ichi

The Roman Catholic Archdiocese of Dar-es-Salaam (Latin: Archidioecesis Daressalaamensis) is a Latin Metropolitan archdiocese of the Roman Catholic Church in Tanzania.

The archdiocese's motherchurch and seat of its archbishop is St. Joseph's Cathedral. The Archdiocese has been led by Archbishop Jude Thaddaeus Ruwa'ichi since 15 August 2019.

== History ==
- It was erected as the Apostolic Prefecture of Southern Zanguebar by Pope Leo XIII on November 16, 1897, on territory split off from the then Apostolic Vicariate of Zanguebar.
- It was promoted to Apostolic Vicariate of Southern Zanguebar on September 15, 1902. It was renamed by Pope Pius X as the Apostolic Vicariate of Dar-es-Salaam on August 10, 1906.
- Lost territories on November 12, 1913 to establish the Apostolic Prefecture of Lindi and again on March 3, 1922 to establish the Apostolic Prefecture of Iringa
- Promoted to Metropolitan Archdiocese by Pope Pius XII on March 25, 1953
- Lost territories on April 21, 1964 to establish Diocese of Mahenge and again on December 12, 1964 to establish the then Apostolic Administration of Zanzibar and Pemba (now Diocese of Zanzibar, both its suffragans
- It enjoyed a papal visit from Pope John Paul II in September 1990.
- Lost territories on March 7, 2025 to establish Diocese of Bagamoyo

== Province ==
Its ecclesiastical province comprises the Metropolitan's own archdiocese and the following suffragan bishoprics:

- Roman Catholic Diocese of Bagamoyo
- Roman Catholic Diocese of Ifakara
- Roman Catholic Diocese of Mahenge
- Roman Catholic Diocese of Morogoro
- Roman Catholic Diocese of Tanga
- Roman Catholic Diocese of Zanzibar.

== Leadership ==
Apostolic Prefects of Southern Zanguebar

- Bonifatius Fleschutz, OSB (1887-1891)
- Maurus Hartmann, OSB (1894-1902)

Apostolic Vicar of Southern Zanguebar

- Cassian Spiß, OSB (1902-1905)

Apostolic Vicars of Dar-es-Salaam

- Thomas Spreiter, OSB (1906-1920), appointed Apostolic Vicar of Natal and later Apostolic Vicar of Eshowe
- Joseph Gabriel Zelger, OFMCap (1923-1929)
- Edgar Aristide Maranta, OFMCap (1930-1953)

Archbishops of Dar-es-Salaam

- Edgar Aristide Maranta, OFMCap (1953-1968)
- Cardinal Laurean Rugambwa (1968-1992)
- Polycarp Pengo (1992-2019, Coadjutor 1990-1992) (Cardinal in 1998)
- Jude Thaddaeus Ruwa'ichi, OFMCap (2019–present, Coadjutor 2018–2020)

Coadjutor Archbishops

- Polycarp Pengo (1990-1992)
- Jude Thaddaeus Ruwa'ichi, OFMCap (2018–2019)

Auxiliary Bishops

- Method Kilaini (1999-2009), appointed auxiliary bishop of Bukoba
- Salutaris Melchior Libena (2010-2012), appointed Bishop of Ifakara
- Elias Mchonde (1956-1964), appointed Bishop of Mahenge
- Titus Joseph Mdoe (2013-2015), appointed Bishop of Mtwara
- Eusebius Alfred Nzigilwa (2010-2020), appointed Bishop of Mpanda
- Henry Mchamungu (21 September 2021 to date)
- Stephano Lameck Musomba, O.S.A (21 September 2021 to date)

== See also ==
- Roman Catholicism in Tanzania
