= Morogo =

Leafy vegetable

- Course: African spinach
- Place of origin: South Africa

Morogo or moroho, also known as African spinach, pigweed, hanekam, or scientifically as Amaranthus sp., refers to a group of at least three different dark green leafy vegetables found throughout Southern Africa harvested for human consumption. It is considered a traditional South African dish and forms an important part of the staple diet in rural communities.

== Health benefits and safety ==
Morogo leaves have a protein content of up to 36%. The ultimate vitamin content is dependent on the age of the plant and method of preparation; the plants contain vitamin A and vitamin C and complement the low levels of calcium, magnesium and iron in maize. In South Africa one of the varieties is known as "pigweed" in English, "hanekam" in Afrikaans and scientifically, Amaranthus sp.

An examination of three widely consumed variants have found that its consumption may lower the risk of vascular-related chronic diseases and type 2 diabetes.

However, in some circumstances Morogo may increase the risk of fungal infection, specifically fusariosis, especially among immunocompromised individuals such as those with AIDS. A study found high levels of Alternaria fungi in internal leaf structures and Fusarium fungi on leaf surfaces. A separate study asserts that Morogo is not a natural host to Fusarium, but may be cross-infected by close proximity to maize crops.
