= Kilomeni =

Ward in Mwanga District, Kilimanjaro Region

- Location in Tanzania
- Coordinates: 3°46′S 37°39′E
- Country: Tanzania
- Region: Kilimanjaro Region
- District: Mwanga District

Population (2012)
  - Total: 4,467
- Time zone: UTC+3 (East Africa Time)

Kilomeni is a ward in the Mwanga District of the Kilimanjaro Region of Tanzania and is situated in the Pare Mountains. Kilomeni is home to a Roman Catholic parish, a secondary school, and a primary school. According to the 2012 census, the population of the ward was 4,467. The local people of kilomeni are The Pare (Pronounce "Pahray").

Kilomeni divided in to two administrative villages KILOMENI & SOFE.

Mwl Mohamed Hassan Mgallah is the ward councillor since 2020 -

== Economy ==
The economy of Kilomeni and the surrounding area is based on subsistence farming; coffee, bananas, and maize are the main crops.

== LOCAL FOOD ==
MAKANDE is the main dish for pare people, Makande is made by combining maize with beans. Both are soaked overnight and then cooked until soft.
