= Archdiocese of Dodoma =

Roman Catholic archdiocese in Tanzania, Africa

Coordinates: 6.1833°S 35.7396°E

Archdiocese of Dodoma Archidioecesis Dodomaënsis
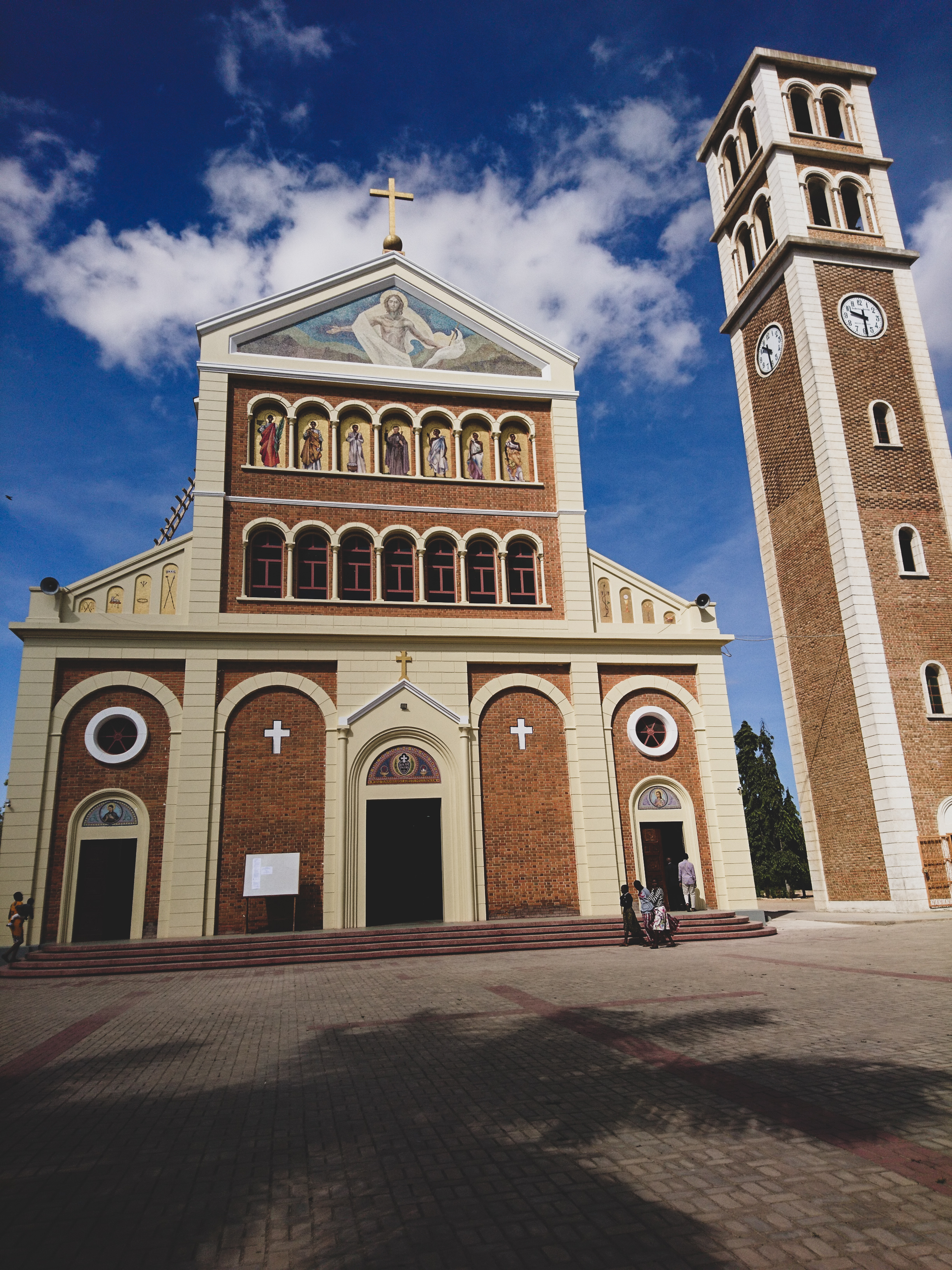
- St. Paul of the Cross Cathedral

Location
- Country: Tanzania
- Metropolitan: Archdiocese of Dodoma

Statistics
- Area: 41,311 km^{2} (15,950 sq mi)
- Population: Total; Catholics: (as of 2006); 1,831,000; 381,479 (20.8%)

Information
- Denomination: Roman Catholic
- Rite: Latin Rite
- Cathedral: Saint Paul of the Cross Cathedral

Current leadership
- Pope: Leo XIV
- Metropolitan Archbishop: Beatus Kinyaiya, OFMCap

The Roman Catholic Archdiocese of Dodoma (Latin: Archidioecesis Dodomaënsis) is an ecclesiastical territory or diocese of the Roman Catholic Church in Tanzania located in the city of Dodoma.

== History ==
- January 28, 1935: Established as Apostolic Prefecture of Dodoma from the Apostolic Vicariate of Bagamoyo, Apostolic Prefecture of Iringa and Apostolic Vicariate of Kilima-Njaro
- May 10, 1951: Promoted as Apostolic Vicariate of Dodoma
- March 25, 1953: Promoted as Diocese of Dodoma
- November 6, 2014: Promoted as Archdiocese of Dodoma

== Special churches ==
The cathedral church is St. Paul of the Cross in Dodoma.

== Bishops ==
- Prefect Apostolic of Dodoma (Roman rite)
  - Fr. Stanislao dell’Addolorata, CP (1937.06.16 – 1941)
- Vicar Apostolic of Dodoma (Roman rite)
  - Bishop Anthony Jeremiah Pesce, CP (1951.05.10 – 1953.03.25 see below)
- Bishops of Dodoma (Roman rite)
  - Bishop Anthony Jeremiah Pesce, CP (see above 1953.03.25 – 1971.12.20)
  - Bishop Matthias Joseph Isuja (1972.06.26 – 2005.01.15)
  - Bishop Jude Thaddaeus Ruwa'ichi, OFMCap (2005.01.15 - 2010.11.10), appointed Archbishop of Mwanza
  - Bishop Gervas John Mwasikwabhila Nyaisonga (2011.03.19 - 2014.02.17), appointed Bishop of Mpanda
- Archbishops of Dodoma (Roman rite)
  - Archbishop Beatus Kinyaiya, OFMCap (2014.11.06 -)

== Auxiliary bishops of Dodoma ==
- Wilbroad Henry Kibozi (Since 12 February 2024)

=== Other priest of this diocese who became bishop ===
- Bernardin Francis Mfumbusa, appointed Bishop of Kondoa in 2011

== Suffragan Dioceses ==
- Diocese of Kondoa
- Diocese of Singida

== See also ==
- Roman Catholicism in Tanzania

== Sources ==
- GCatholic.org
- Catholic Hierarchy
