= Mwanga District, Kilimanjaro =

District of Kilimanjaro Region, Tanzania

Mwanga District Wilaya ya Same (Swahili)
- District
- Wilaya ya Mwanga, Mkoa wa Kilimanjaro
- Nickname: "Home of the North Pare Mountains"
- Mwanga District in Kilimanjaro Region 2022
- Coordinates: 03°45′0″S 37°40′0.12″E
- Country: Tanzania
- Region: Kilimanjaro Region
- Capital: Mwanga

Area
  - Total: 1,831 km^{2} (707 sq mi)
- Elevation: 684 m (2,244 ft)
- Highest elevation (Kindoroko Peak): 2,100 m (6,900 ft)

Population (2022)
  - Total: 148,763
  - Density: 81.25/km^{2} (210.4/sq mi)
- Demonym: Mwangan

Ethnic groups
  - Settler: Swahili
  - Native: Pare & Chaga
- Tanzanian Postal Code: 255**
- Website: District website

Mwanga is one of the seven districts of the Kilimanjaro Region of Tanzania. The district covers an area of 1,831 km^{2} (707 sq mi), It is bordered to the northeast by Kenya, to the northwest by the Moshi Rural District, to the southwest by Simanjiro District of Manyara Region, and to the south by the Same District. Its administrative seat is the town of Mwanga. The tallest peak in the district is Kindoroko at 2,100m in the North Pare Mountains that are located entirely within the district. According to the 2022 Tanzania National Census, the population of Mwanga District was 148,763.

== Administrative subdivisions ==
=== Wards ===
The Mwanga District is administratively divided into 20 wards:

- Chomvu
- Jipe
- Kifula
- Kighare
- Kileo
- Kilomeni
- Kigonigoni

- Kirongwe
- Kirya
- Kwakoa
- Lang'ata
- Lembeni
- Msangeni

- Mwanga
- Mwaniko
- Ngujini
- Shigatini
- Toloha
- Kivisini
- Mgagao

== Notable people from Mwanga District ==
- Cleopa Msuya, 3rd Tanzanian Prime Minister

== Sources ==
- 2002 Population and Housing Census Report - National Bureau of Statistics
- Mwanga District Homepage
