= Augustine Ndeliakyama Shao =

Tanzanian Catholic prelate

Augustine Ndeliakyama Shao CSSp
- Bishop of Zanzibar
- Church: Catholic Church
- Appointed: 30 November 1996
- Predecessor: Bernard Martin Ngaviliau

Orders
- Ordination: 4 June 1983
- Consecration: 27 April 1997 by Polycarp Pengo

Personal details
- Born: 25 September 1951 (age 74) Mengwe (in present-day Rombo District), Northern Province, Tanganyika Territory, British Empire

Augustine Ndeliakyama Shao, CSSp, known as Augustine Shao (born 25 September 1951) is a Tanzanian prelate of the Catholic Church who has been the bishop of the Roman Catholic Diocese of Zanzibar in Tanzania since 1997.

Augustine Ndeliakyama Shao was born in Rombo District, Kilimanjaro, Tanzania, on 25 September 1951.

He was ordained a priest of the Congregation of the Holy Spirit (Holy Ghost Fathers) on 4 June 1983.

Pope John Paul II named him bishop of Zanzibar in Tanzania on 30 November 1996. He received his episcopal consecration on 27 April 1997 from Polycarp Pengo, Archbishop of Dar es Salaam.

On 20 June 2009, Pope Benedict XVI named him a member of the Pontifical Council for Interreligious Dialogue.

At the Synod of Bishops special assembly for Africa in October 2009, he advised that the Catholic bishops of Africa needed to "change our mind set about our own cultures, traditions and taboos used and practiced by African traditional religions. The language and the names given to these groups do not at all encourage dialogue and openness. The names like pagans and animist do not allow one to tell the truth about his/her faith. As a result you have Sunday Christians and African traditional religion practice the other six days of the week. The Church in Africa should in every way struggle to harmonize and bring at peace the consciences of the African faithful who seek to be true disciples of Christ, but find themselves on the cross roads."

In a 2010 interview with Vatican Radio, he addressed the question of enculturation of the Catholic faith in Africa, calling for a deeper appreciation of culture based on an examination of local traditions and a detailed understanding of local religious beliefs and practices, which would allow them to be embodied according to Gospel truths.

His principal challenge as bishop has been violence against priests on the part of Muslim terrorists.

== Publication ==
- Shao, A., "Interreligious Dialogue in Zanzibar" in Spiritan Horizons, February 2020
