= Jude Thaddaeus Ruwa'ichi =

Tanzanian Catholic Archbishop

The Most Reverend Jude Thadaeus Ruwa'ichi OFM Cap
- Archbishop of Dar-es-Salaam
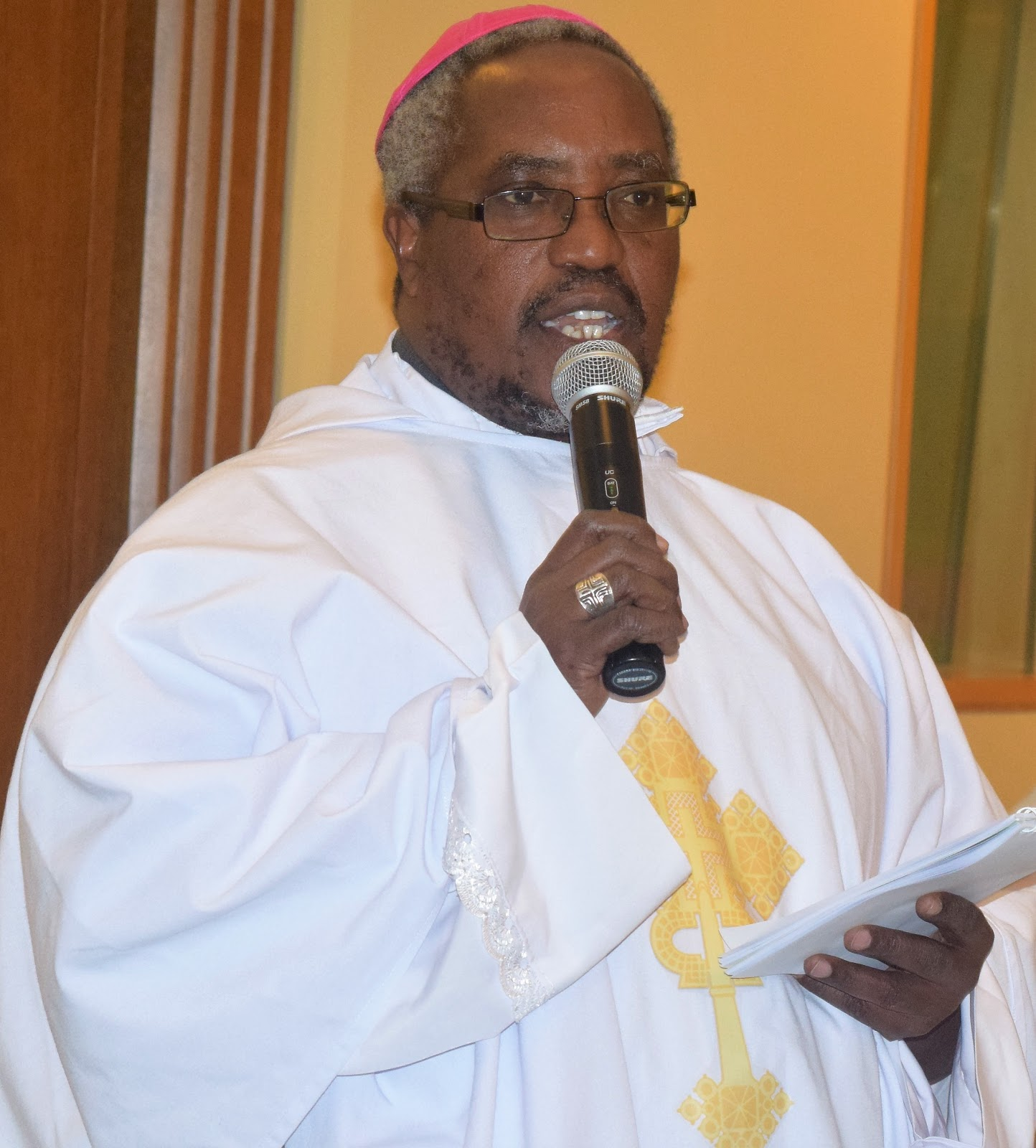
- Most Rev. Jude Thaddeus Ruwa'ichi, Archbishop of Dar es Salaam, Tanzania during his homily on 18 July 2018 in Addis Ababa, Ethiopia
- Church: Catholic Church
- Appointed: 15 August 2019
- Predecessor: Polycarp Pengo
- Previous posts: Bishop of Mbulu (1999–2005); Bishop of Dodoma (2005–2010); Archbishop of Mwanza (2010–2018); Archbishop Coadjutor of Dar-es-Salaam (2018–2019)

Orders
- Ordination: 25 November 1981
- Consecration: 16 May 1999 by Polycarp Pengo

Personal details
- Born: 30 December 1953 (age 72) Mulo-Kilema, Kilimanjaro, Tanganyika Territory
- Residence: Archbishop's House, Holy Spirit Parish, Segerea
- Motto: Bwana wajua kwamba nakupenda (Swahili for 'Lord you know that I love you')
- Coat of arms

Styles of Jude Thaddaeus Ruwa'ichi
- Coat of arms of Archbishop Jude Thaddaeus Ruwa'ichi
- Reference style: The Most Reverend
- Spoken style: Your Grace
- Religious style: Archbishop

Ordination history of Jude Thaddaeus Ruwa'ichi, O.F.M.Cap
History
Episcopal consecration
- Principal consecrator: Polycarp Cardinal Pengo
- Co-consecrators: Josaphat Louis Lebulu; Justin Tetmu Samba†
Episcopal succession
Bishops consecrated by Jude Thaddaeus Ruwa'ichi, O.F.M.Cap as principal consecrator
- Flavian Matindi Kassala: 12 June 2016
- Henry Mchamungu: 21 September 2021
- Stephano Lameck Musomba, O.S.A: 21 September 2021
- Thomas John Kiangio: 03 September 2023

Jude Thadaeus Ruwa'ichi, OFMCap (born 30 January 1954) is a Tanzanian prelate of the Catholic Church who has been Archbishop of Dar-es-Salaam since 15 August 2019. He is a Capuchin and has been a bishop since 1998.

== Biography ==
Jude Thaddeus Ruwa'ichi was born on 30 December 1954 in Mulo-Kilema, in the Diocese of Moshi, Kilimanjaro Region, Tanzania. The surname Ruwa'ichi is a Chagga name meaning God knows (Swahili: Mungu anajua). He joined the Capuchins and was ordained a priest on 25 November 1981. He has served as a member of the order's governing body (General Definitorium).

Pope John Paul II appointed him Bishop of Mbulu on 9 February 1999. He received his episcopal consecration from Archbishop Polycarp Pengo on 16 May. Pope John Paul appointed him Archbishop of Dodoma on 15 January 2005.

On 10 November 2010, Pope Benedict XVI appointed him Archbishop of Mwanza. In 2014, he participated in the launch of a program for the prevention and treatment of HIV combined with efforts to prevent discrimination against people living with HIV. The program was based on a partnership with government agencies with NGO funding. He also served as Apostolic Administrator of the Diocese of Shinyanga from 2013 to 2015.

Pope Francis appointed him Archbishop Coadjutor of Dar es Salaam on 21 June 2018. Ruwa'ichi became Archbishop upon the retirement of Cardinal Polycarp Pengo on 15 August 2019.

In March 2019, while announcing a partnership with private insurers to provide life insurance as they had health insurance, he challenged them to address education insurance to allow families to finance education with less dependence on sponsors and patrons.

He was President of the Tanzania Episcopal Conference from 2006 to 2012. He has been an advocate of the Small Christian Communities movement.

He is the chairman of Caritas Tanzania and has been a member of the Dicastery for Institutes of Consecrated Life and Societies of Apostolic Life since 2025.
