= Roman Catholic Archdiocese of Arusha =

Catholic archdiocese in Tanzania

Archdiocese of Arusha Archidioecesis Arusha Jimbo Kuu Katoliki la Arusha

Catholic
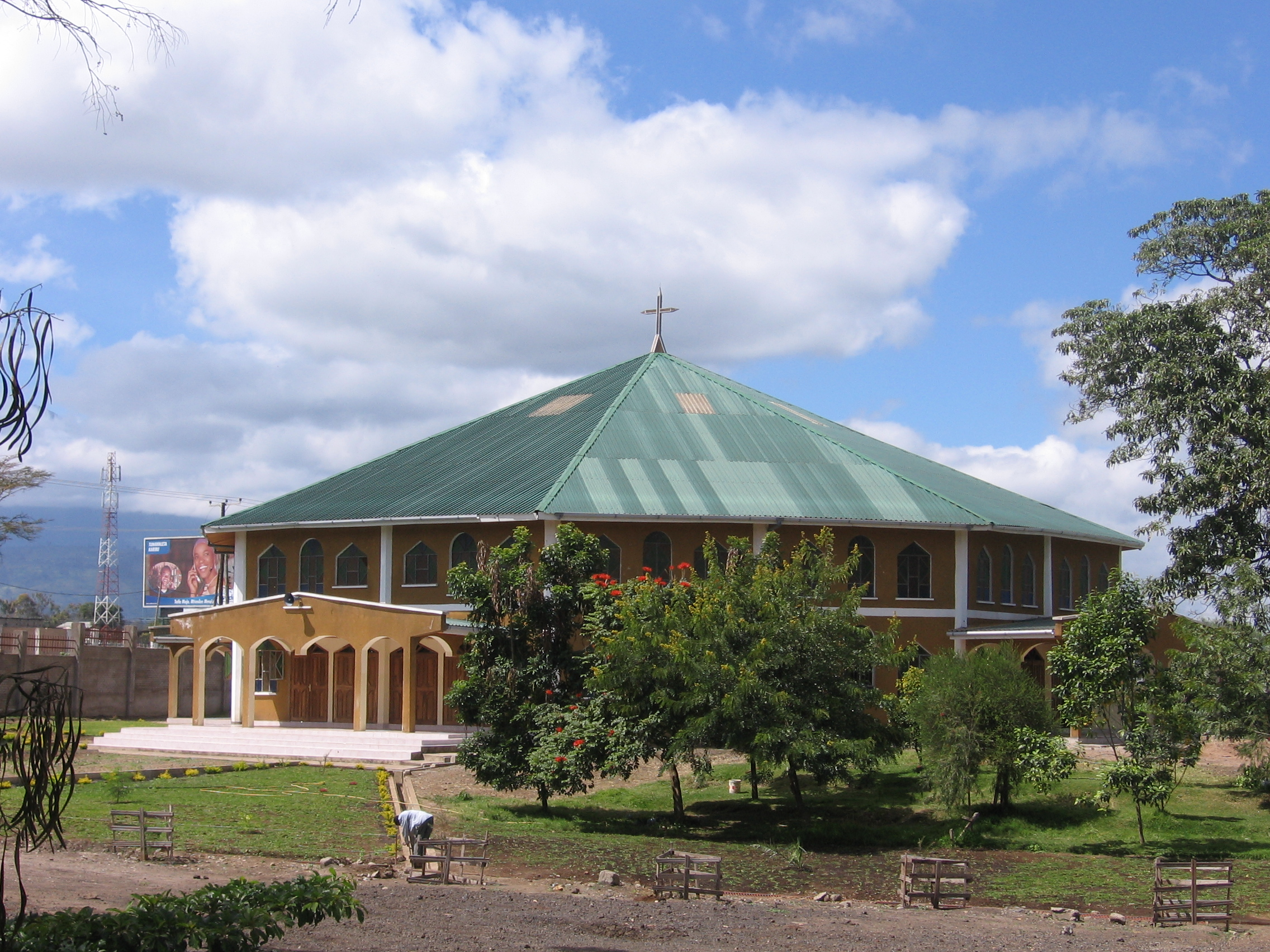
- Cathedral of Arusha

Location
- Country: Tanzania
- Territory: Arusha Region and the Simanjiro and Kiteto districts of the Manyara Region
- Episcopal conference: Tanzania Episcopal Conference
- Ecclesiastical province: Arusha
- Metropolitan: Arusha
- Headquarters: St Theresa's Metropolitan Cathedral (Arusha)
- Coordinates: 3°22′16.8″S 36°41′29.3″E

Statistics
- Area: 67,340 km^{2} (26,000 sq mi) (Note: Annuario Pontificio (2023) via Catholic-Hierarchy.org)
- Population: Total; Catholics: (as of 2023); 3,223,000; 624,206 (19.4%)
- Parishes: 54
- Churches: 130

Information
- Denomination: Catholic
- Sui iuris church: Latin Church
- Rite: Roman Rite
- Established: 1 March 1963; 63 years ago
- Cathedral: St. Theresa’s Metropolitan Cathedral
- Patron saint: Saint Theresa of the Child Jesus
- Secular priests: 132 (total); 56 (diocesan); 76 (religious)
- Language: Swahili

Current leadership
- Pope: Leo XIV
- Archbishop: Isaac Amani Massawe
- Metropolitan Archbishop: Isaac Amani Massawe
- Auxiliary Bishops: Prosper Balthazar Lyimo
- Vicar General: Simon Tenges
- Bishops emeritus: Josaphat Louis Lebulu

Website
- www.arusha-archdiocese.or.tz

The Archdiocese of Arusha (Latin: Archidioecesis Arushaënsis) is a Latin Church archdiocese of the Catholic Church in Arusha, Tanzania. The archdiocese is the metropolitan see for the Ecclesiastical Province of Arusha. The suffragan dioceses of the archdiocese are Mbulu, Moshi and Same.

The archdiocese covers an area of about 67,340 square kilometres and includes the entire Arusha Region and two administrative districts of Manyara Region (Simanjiro and Kiteto) in north-eastern Tanzania.

== History ==
The Archdiocese of Arusha is among 34 dioceses of the Catholic Church in Tanzania, which practise the Roman Rite. Evangelisation in Arusha started on July 15, 1926 when Holy Ghost Fathers missionaries from Kilimanjaro were invited to visit Arusha. At that time, Arusha was the part of Apostolic Vicariate of Kilima-Njaro. These priests arrived in Arusha and opened a mission in an area known as Mesopotamia. The Mission centre of Mesopotamia developed slowly into a parish, which became known as St Theresa of the Child Jesus Parish.

- March 1, 1963: Established as Diocese of Arusha from the Diocese of Moshi
- March 16, 1999: Elevated as Metropolitan Archdiocese of Arusha

== Special churches ==
The seat of the archbishop is St. Theresa’s Metropolitan Cathedral in Arusha.

== Bishops ==
- Bishops of Arusha (Roman Rite)
  - Dennis Vincent Durning, C.S.Sp. (1963.03.01 – 1989.03.06)
  - Fortunatus M. Lukanima (1989.03.06 – 1998.07.20)
  - Josaphat Louis Lebulu (1998.11.28 – 1999.03.16); see below
- Metropolitan Archbishops of Arusha (Roman Rite)
  - Josaphat Louis Lebulu (1999.03.16 – 2017.12.27); see above
  - Isaac Amani Massawe (2017.12.27 – )

=== Auxiliary Bishop ===
- Prosper Balthazar Lyimo (2014– )

== Suffragan dioceses ==
- Mbulu
- Moshi
- Same

== See also ==
- Association of Member Episcopal Conferences in Eastern Africa
- Catholic Church in Tanzania
- Hierarchy of the Catholic Church
- List of Catholic dioceses in Tanzania
- Symposium of Episcopal Conferences of Africa and Madagascar
