= List of Hero System products =

The Hero System (or HERO System) is a generic role-playing game system that developed from the superhero RPG Champions. This page lists all the products published for use with this role-playing system.

== Product types ==
Publishers and gamers classify HERO System products into a few types of books:

- Rulebook: Provides some version of the HERO System rules engine.
- Rules Supplement: Provides new or optional rules (for the game system as a whole, or a particular setting), but not the core rules engine itself.
- Genre Book: Covers creating and running games in a particular genre using the HERO System.
- Subgenre Book: Like a Genre Book, but focusing on a narrower segment of the full genre.
- Campaign Setting: Describes a fictional world and/or provides parameters for a campaign.
- Setting Expansion: Offers more detail on an existing Campaign Setting, such as detailing a single city or country within a larger fictional world.
- Creature Book: Describes general monsters, animals, or similar classes of characters. For example, it might include "demons" or "vampires," but not a specific demon or vampire.
- Enemies Book: Details specific adversaries for use in adventures (villains & villain teams, individually named monsters and antagonists, etc.).
- Characters Book: Contains specific characters (like an Enemies Book), but not necessarily adversaries (allies, supporting characters, etc.).
- Organization Book: Details the structure and workings of one or more organizations (companies, agencies, criminal empires, and so on).
- Adventure Book: Outlines one or more pre-prepared adventure scenarios.
- Powers Book: Offers pre-defined powers, spells, or the like.
- Equipment Book: Details pre-defined gear of one or more kinds.
- Playing Aid: Game-assistance material such as GM screens.

== HERO System genres ==
Players typically refer to various story genres by the name of the HERO System genre book most prominently or most recently associated with it as follows:

- Champions: Comic-book style superheroes. This is the genre most closely associated with the HERO System, and was also the title of the first HERO System game in 1981. Many players call the game system itself by the name "Champions," or consider that name interchangeable with the term "HERO System."
- Fantasy Hero: Fantasy adventure typically featuring wizards, swordsmen, kings, quests, dragons, prophecies, and so on.
- Star Hero: Science-Fiction and other futuristic settings.
- Pulp Hero: Action-Adventure in the style of the 1920s-1930s pulp adventure magazines (flying aces, daring archaeologists, Nazis, masked men, gangsters, mad scientists, and so on).
- Dark Champions: Modern-day Action Adventure such as non-superpowered vigilantes, military or law enforcement, international espionage, etc.
- Horror Hero: Stories played for fright, usually featuring normal people facing (or fleeing) supernatural evil or other Things Man Was Not Meant To Know.
- Ninja Hero: Martial Arts adventure in the vein of wuxia cinema and similar tales.
- Cyber Hero: Near-future (often dystopian) stories typically spotlighting the convergence of humanity and technology.
- Post-Apocalyptic Hero: Adventure in worlds after the fall of an earlier civilization.
- Western Hero: Sixguns and sheriffs in the American Wild West.
- Robot Warriors: Anime-style Mecha adventure.
- The Widening Gyre: Steampunk adventure.

List of HERO System products
Title	Author(s)	Publisher	Stock Number	Product Type	Genre(s)	HERO System Edition	Year	Format	Notes
3rd World	Denver Mason	BlackWyrm Games		Campaign Setting	Star Hero	6th	2011	Both	
A Companion to Superworld	Steve Perrin	Chaosium	2404	Rules Supplement	Champions	3rd	1984	Printed	
Acid Magic	Steven S. Long	Elvensong Street Press		Powers Book	Fantasy Hero	6th	2012	PDF	
Acquitaine	Steven S. Long	Elvensong Street Press		Setting Expansion	Fantasy Hero	6th	2012	PDF	
Adventures Into Darkness	Kenneth Hite	Atomic Overmind Press		Campaign Setting	Champions & Horror Hero	5th	2008	Both	
Alien Enemies	Scott Heine	Iron Crown Enterprises	413	Enemies Book	Champions	4th	1990	Printed	
Alien Wars	Allen Thomas	DOJ, Inc. d/b/a Hero Games		Campaign Setting	Star Hero	5th	2003	Both	
Allies	Scott K. Jamison	Iron Crown Enterprises	427	Characters Book	Champions	4th	1993	Printed	
An Eye For An Eye	Steven S. Long	Iron Crown Enterprises	432	Rules Supplement	Dark Champions	4th	1994	Both	
Arcane Adversaries	Dean Shomshak	DOJ, Inc. d/b/a Hero Games		Enemies Book	Champions	5th	2004	Both	
Aaron Allston's Strike Force	Aaron Allston	Iron Crown Enterprises	42	Campaign Setting	Champions	3rd	1988	Printed	
Aaron Allston's Strike Force	Aaron Allston, Michael Surbrook, Sean Patrick Fannon, Steve Kenson	Evil Beagle Games & High Rock Press		Campaign Setting	Champions	6th	2016	Both	
Asian Bestiary, Vol. 1	Michael Surbrook	DOJ, Inc. d/b/a Hero Games		Creature Book	Fantasy Hero	5th	2006	Both	
Asian Bestiary, Vol. 2	Michael Surbrook	DOJ, Inc. d/b/a Hero Games		Creature Book	Fantasy Hero	5th	2006	Both	
Atlantis	Patrick E. Bradley	Iron Crown Enterprises	441	Setting Expansion	Champions	4th	1995	Printed	
Atlas Unleashed	David Rogers	Iron Crown Enterprises	48	Adventure Book	Champions	3rd	1989	Printed	
Autoduel Champions	Aaron Allston	Steve Jackson Games	7107	Campaign Setting	Champions	2nd	1983	Printed	
Bad Medicine for Dr. Drugs	Ken Rolston & Butch Guice	Chaosium	2402	Adventure Book	Champions	2nd	1983	Printed	
Bay City	Matthew D. Grau, Bruce Harlick & Steven S. Long	R. Talsorian Games	10021	Setting Expansion	Champions	4th	1997	Printed	
Blood Fury	Dean Edgell	Atlas Games	3510	Adventure Book	Champions	4th	1996	Printed	
Bloodsucker Rampage	Steven S. Long	DOJ, Inc. d/b/a Hero Games		Creature Book	Not Genre-Specific	6th	2010	PDF	
Book of the Destroyer	Steven S. Long	DOJ, Inc. d/b/a Hero Games		Organization Book	Champions	5th	2008	Both	
Book of the Empress	Steven S. Long	DOJ, Inc. d/b/a Hero Games		Organization Book	Champions	6th	2012	Both	
Book of the Machine	Steven S. Long	DOJ, Inc. d/b/a Hero Games		Organization Book	Champions	5th	2009	Both	
Border Crossing	L. Douglas Garrett	Hero Games	10	Adventure Book	Dark Champions	2nd	1983	Printed	
Born To Be Wild	Steven S. Long	DOJ, Inc. d/b/a Hero Games		Rules Supplement	Pulp Hero	6th	2009	PDF	
Bright Future	Donna Millheim & Edwin Millheim	Hero Games		Campaign Setting	Star Hero	4th	1997	PDF	
Broken Kingdoms	Jason Vester	Hero Games		Campaign Setting	Fantasy Hero	4th	1998	PDF	
C.L.O.W.N.	Stan West	Iron Crown Enterprises	46	Organization Book	Champions	3rd	1989	Printed	
Campaign Classics: Mythic Egypt	Earl Wajenburg	Iron Crown Enterprises	1050	Subgenre Book	Fantasy Hero	4th	1990	Printed	
Campaign Classics: Mythic Greece	Aaron Allston	Iron Crown Enterprises	1020	Subgenre Book	Fantasy Hero	3rd	1988	Printed	
Campaign Classics: Pirates	Gorham Palmer	Iron Crown Enterprises	1040	Subgenre Book	Fantasy Hero	4th	1990	Printed	
Campaign Classics: Robin Hood	Graham Staplehurst	Iron Crown Enterprises	1010	Subgenre Book	Fantasy Hero	3rd	1987	Printed	
Campaign Classics: Vikings	Lee Gold	Iron Crown Enterprises	1030	Subgenre Book	Fantasy Hero	3rd	1989	Printed	
Captain Battle & the Science Police	Steven S. Long	DOJ, Inc. d/b/a Hero Games		Organization Book	Pulp Hero	5th	2005	PDF	
Challenges for Champions	Andrew Robinson	Iron Crown Enterprises	404	Adventure Book	Champions	4th	1989	Printed	
Champions	George MacDonald & Steve Peterson	Hero Games	01B	Rulebook & Genre Book	Core Rules & Champions	1st	1981	Printed	
Champions	George MacDonald & Steve Peterson	Hero Games	01B	Rulebook & Genre Book	Core Rules & Champions	2nd	1982	Printed	
Champions	George MacDonald & Steve Peterson	Hero Games	01B	Rulebook & Genre Book	Core Rules & Champions	3rd	1984	Printed	
Champions	George MacDonald & Steve Peterson	Hero Games	01	Rulebook & Genre Book	Core Rules & Champions	3rd	1986	Printed	
Champions	George MacDonald, Steve Peterson, & Rob Bell	Iron Crown Enterprises	400	Rulebook & Genre Book	Core Rules & Champions	4th	1989	Printed	
Champions	George MacDonald, Steve Peterson, & Rob Bell	Iron Crown Enterprises	450	Rulebook & Genre Book	Core Rules & Champions	4th	1989	Printed	
Champions	Aaron Allston & Steven S. Long	DOJ, Inc. (d/b/a Hero Games)		Genre Book	Champions	5th	2002	Both	
Champions	Steven S. Long & Aaron Allston	DOJ, Inc. (d/b/a Hero Games)		Genre Book	Champions	6th	2010	Both	
Champions Battlegrounds	Derek Hiemforth, Andy Matthews, Allen Thomas, Jason Walters, & Darren Watts	DOJ, Inc. (d/b/a Hero Games)		Adventure Book	Champions	5th	2003	Both	
Champions Beyond	Steven S. Long	DOJ, Inc. d/b/a Hero Games		Setting Expansion	Champions	6th	2011	Both	
Champions Complete	Derek Hiemforth	DOJ, Inc. d/b/a Hero Games		Rulebook & Genre Book	Core Rules & Champions	6th	2012	Both	
Champions Deluxe	George MacDonald, Steve Peterson, & Rob Bell	Iron Crown Enterprises	451	Rulebook & Genre Book	Core Rules & Champions	4th	1995	Printed	
Champions GM Screen	(none credited)	Hero Games	05	Playing Aid	Champions	1st	1981	Printed	
Champions GM Screen	(none credited)	Hero Games	05	Playing Aid	Champions	2nd	1982	Printed	
Champions GM Screen	(none credited)	Hero Games	19	Playing Aid	Champions	3rd	1985	Printed	
Champions GM Screen	(none credited)	Iron Crown Enterprises	401	Playing Aid	Champions	4th	1989	Printed	
Champions II	Bruce Harlick (ed.)	Hero Games	08	Rules Supplement	Champions	2nd	1982	Printed	
Champions III	Steve Peterson (ed.)	Hero Games	15	Rules Supplement	Champions	2nd	1984	Printed	
Champions in 3-D	Rob Bell (ed.)	Iron Crown Enterprises	411	Subgenre Book	Champions	4th	1990	Printed	
Champions of the North	Jon Mattson	Iron Crown Enterprises	419	Setting Expansion	Champions	4th	1992	Printed	
Champions of the North	Scott Bennie	DOJ, Inc. d/b/a Hero Games		Setting Expansion	Champions	5th	2007	Both	
Champions Powers	Steven S. Long	DOJ, Inc. d/b/a Hero Games		Powers Book	Champions	6th	2010	Both	
Champions Presents	Scott Sigler, Phil Masters, & Dean & Dana Edgell	Iron Crown Enterprises	418	Adventure Book	Champions	4th	1991	Printed	
Champions Presents 2	Stan West, Timothy Keating, & Cliff Christiansen	Iron Crown Enterprises	424	Adventure Book	Champions	4th	1993	Printed	
Champions Twenty-Fifth Anniversary Edition	Aaron Allston, Steven S. Long, & Darren Watts	DOJ, Inc. d/b/a Hero Games		Genre Book & Campaign Setting	Champions	5th	2006	Printed	
Champions Universe	Monte Cook (ed.)	Iron Crown Enterprises	421	Campaign Setting	Champions	4th	1992	Printed	
Champions Universe	Steven S. Long & Darren Watts	DOJ, Inc. (d/b/a Hero Games)		Campaign Setting	Champions	5th	2002	Both	
Champions Universe	Steven S. Long & Darren Watts	DOJ, Inc. d/b/a Hero Games		Campaign Setting	Champions	6th	2010	Both	
Champions Universe: News Of The World	Darren Watts & Steven S. Long	DOJ, Inc. d/b/a Hero Games		Setting Expansion	Champions	5th	2007	Both	
Champions Villains Volume One: Master Villains	Steven S. Long	DOJ, Inc. d/b/a Hero Games		Enemies Book	Champions	6th	2010	Both	
Champions Villains Volume Two: Villain Teams	Steven S. Long	DOJ, Inc. d/b/a Hero Games		Enemies Book	Champions	6th	2011	Both	
Champions Villains Volume Three: Solo Villains	Steven S. Long	DOJ, Inc. d/b/a Hero Games		Enemies Book	Champions	6th	2012	Both	
Champions Worldwide	Darren Watts & Steven S. Long	DOJ, Inc. d/b/a Hero Games		Setting Expansion	Champions	5th	2005	Both	
Champions: New Millennium 2nd Edition	Eric Burnham	Cybergames.com		Campaign Setting	Champions	4th	2000	Printed	
Champions: New Millenium: Alliances	Eric Burnham, Steven S. Long, Steve Peterson, Bruce Harlick	Hero Games		Setting Expansion	Champions	4th	2001	PDF	
Character Creation Handbook	Steven S. Long	DOJ, Inc. d/b/a Hero Games		Rulebook	Core Rules	5th	2007	Both	
Chasing A Golden Buck	Thomas Rafalski	Beautifulharmony Multimedia		Adventure Book	Fantasy Hero	5th	2006	PDF	
Classic Enemies	Scott Bennie	Iron Crown Enterprises	403	Enemies Book	Champions	4th	1989	Both	
Classic Organizations	Rob Bell & Chad Brinkley (eds.)	Iron Crown Enterprises	416	Organization Book	Champions	4th	1991	Printed	
Conquerors, Killers, & Crooks	Steven S. Long	DOJ, Inc. (d/b/a Hero Games)		Enemies Book	Champions	5th	2002	Both	
Cops, Crews, & Cabals	Steven S. Long	DOJ, Inc. d/b/a Hero Games		Organization Book	Champions	5th	2007	Both	
Corporations	Mark Arsenault & Geoff Berman	Iron Crown Enterprises	434	Organization Book	Not Genre-Specific	4th	1994	Printed	
Creatures of the Night: Horror Enemies	Dean Shomshak	Iron Crown Enterprises	429	Enemies Book	Champions	4th	1993	Printed	
Cyber Hero	Michael Fine, Michael McAfee, & Curtis Scott	Iron Crown Enterprises	505	Genre Book	Cyber Hero	4th	1992	Printed	
Danger International	L. Douglas Garrett, George MacDonald, & Steve Peterson	Hero Games	17	Rulebook & Genre Book	Core Rules & Dark Champions	3rd	1985	Printed	
Dark Champions	Steven S. Long	Iron Crown Enterprises	423	Genre Book	Dark Champions	4th	1993	Printed	
Dark Champions	Steven S. Long	DOJ, Inc. d/b/a Hero Games		Genre Book	Dark Champions	5th	2004	Both	
Dark Champions: The Animated Series	Allen Thomas	DOJ, Inc. d/b/a Hero Games		Subgenre Book	Dark Champions	5th	2005	Both	
Dark Waters	David E. McGuire & Jason Yarnell	D3 Games		Adventure Book	Fantasy Hero	6th	2009	PDF	
Day of the Destroyer	Scott Bennie	Iron Crown Enterprises	408	Adventure Book	Champions	4th	1990	Printed	
Deathstroke	Kevin Dinapoli	Hero Games	09	Adventure Book	Champions	2nd	1983	Printed	
DEMON: Servants Of Darkness	Allen Thomas	DOJ, Inc. d/b/a Hero Games		Organization Book	Champions	5th	2004	Both	
Demons Rule	Charles Brown	Iron Crown Enterprises	412	Adventure Book	Champions	4th	1990	Printed	
Denizens of San Angelo	R. Sean Borgstrom	Gold Rush Games	302	Characters Book	Champions	4th	2000	Both	
Desert Magic	Steven S. Long	Elvensong Street Press		Powers Book	Fantasy Hero	6th	2012	PDF	
Dystopia	Chris Avellone	Atlas Games		Adventure Book	Dark Champions	4th	1994	Printed	
Edge of the Sword Vol. 1: Compendium of Modern Firearms	Kevin Dockery	R. Talsorian Games		Equipment Book	Not Genre-Specific	4th	1991	Printed	
Enchanted Items	Jason Walters	DOJ, Inc. d/b/a Hero Games		Equipment Book	Fantasy Hero	5th	2007	Both	
Elemental Grimoire	Greg Elkins	Tiger Paw Press		Powers Book	Fantasy Hero (Usable in Other Genre)	6th	2014	PDF	
Enemies	Steve Peterson & George MacDonald	Hero Games	02	Enemies Book	Champions	1st	1981	Printed	
Enemies (Revised)	Steve Peterson & George MacDonald	Hero Games	02	Enemies Book	Champions	2nd	1982	Printed	
Enemies Assemble!	George MacDonald & Bruce Harlick (eds.)	Iron Crown Enterprises	440	Enemies Book	Champions	4th	1995	Printed	
Enemies For Hire	James Davis, Greg Lloyd, & Bruce Tong	Iron Crown Enterprises	439	Enemies Book	Champions	4th	1995	Printed	
Enemies II	Bruce Harlick (ed.)	Hero Games	06	Enemies Book	Champions	2nd	1982	Printed	
Enemies III	Andrew Robinson, David Berge, & Dennis Mallonee	Hero Games	16	Enemies Book	Champions	3rd	1984	Printed	
Enemies of San Angelo	Mark Arsenault, Steve Kenson, & Patrick Sweeney	Gold Rush Games		Enemies Book	Champions	4th	1999	Printed	
Enemies: The International File	Jeff O'Hare	Iron Crown Enterprises	30	Enemies Book	Champions	3rd	1987	Printed	
Enemies: Villainy Unbound	Scott Bennie	Iron Crown Enterprises	36	Enemies Book	Champions	3rd	1988	Printed	
Escape From Stronghold	Steve Peterson & George MacDonald	Hero Games	04	Adventure Book	Champions	1st	1981	Printed	
Espionage!	George MacDonald & Steve Peterson	Hero Games	07B	Rulebook & Genre Book	Core Rules & Dark Champions	2nd	1983	Printed	
European Enemies	William Tracy	Iron Crown Enterprises	417	Enemies Book	Champions	4th	1991	Printed	
Everyman	Steven S. Long	DOJ, Inc. d/b/a Hero Games		Characters Book	Champions	5th	2006	Both	
Evil Unleashed	Steven S. Long, Darren Watts, Allen Thomas, Scott Bennie	DOJ, Inc. d/b/a Hero Games		Enemies Book	Champions	5th	2006	Both	
Expanded Warrior-Magery	Steven S. Long	Elvensong Street Press		Powers Book	Fantasy Hero	6th	2012	PDF	
Fangs Of The Scarlet Serpent	Steven S. Long	DOJ, Inc. d/b/a Hero Games		Adventure Book	Pulp Hero	5th	2006	Both	
Fantasy Hero	Steve Peterson	Hero Games	24	Rulebook & Genre Book	Core Rules & Fantasy Hero	3rd	1985	Printed	
Fantasy Hero	Rob Bell (ed.)	Iron Crown Enterprises	502	Genre Book	Fantasy Hero	4th	1990	Both	
Fantasy Hero	Steven S. Long	DOJ, Inc. d/b/a Hero Games		Genre Book	Fantasy Hero	5th	2003	Both	
Fantasy Hero	Steven S. Long	DOJ, Inc. d/b/a Hero Games		Genre Book	Fantasy Hero	6th	2010	Both	
Fantasy Hero Battlegrounds	Allen Thomas & Jason Walters	DOJ, Inc. d/b/a Hero Games		Adventure Book	Fantasy Hero	5th	2004	Both	
Fantasy Hero Companion	Rob Bell (ed.)	Iron Crown Enterprises	503	Rules Supplement	Fantasy Hero	4th	1990	Both	
Fantasy Hero Companion II	Mark Bennett et al.	Iron Crown Enterprises	506	Rules Supplement	Fantasy Hero	4th	1992	Printed	
Fantasy Hero Complete	Michael Surbrook	DOJ, Inc. d/b/a Hero Games		Genre Book	Fantasy Hero	6th	2015	Both	
Fantasy Hero Grimoire II: The Book of Lost Magics	Steven S. Long	DOJ, Inc. d/b/a Hero Games		Powers Book	Fantasy Hero	5th	2004	Both	
Flextiles									
Four Fiends	Steven S. Long	DOJ, Inc. d/b/a Hero Games		Enemies Book	Pulp Hero	5th	2006	PDF	
Foxbat For President	Michael Satran	BlackWyrm Games		Adventure Book	Champions	6th	2009	Both	
Foxbat Unhinged	Alison Brooks	Atlas Games		Adventure Book	Champions	4th	1996	Printed	
Gadgets & Gear	Steven S. Long	DOJ, Inc. d/b/a Hero Games		Equipment Book	Champions	5th	2004	Both	
Gadgets!	Andrew Robinson	Iron Crown Enterprises	23	Equipment Book	Champions	3rd	1986	Printed	
Galactic Champions	Darren Watts	DOJ, Inc. d/b/a Hero Games		Subgenre Book	Champions	5th	2004	Both	
Gestalt: The Hero Within	Scott Bennie	BlackWyrm Games		Campaign Setting	Champions	5th	2007	Both	
Ghosts, Ghouls, and Golems	Michael Surbrook	High Rock Press		Creature Book	Fantasy & Horror Hero	6th	2017	Both	
Golden Age Champions	Chris Cloutier	Iron Crown Enterprises	436	Subgenre Book	Champions	4th	1994	Printed	
Golden Age Champions	Darren Watts	High Rock Press		Subgenre Book	Champions	6th	2017	Both	
Haunted Heroes	Edwin Millheim, Grant Scheiber, & Krista Fells	Hero Games		Subgenre Book	Not Genre-Specific	4th	1999	PDF	
Here Be Dragons	Michael Surbrook	D3 Games		Creature Book	Fantasy Hero	6th	2011	Both	
Here Be Dragons	Michael Surbrook	Evil Beagle Games		Creature Book	Fantasy Hero	6th	2017	PDF	
Here There Be Tigers	Kevin Dockery & Robert Schroeder	Firebird, Ltd.	1003	Adventure Book	Dark Champions	3rd	1986	Printed	
Hero Bestiary	Doug Tabb	Iron Crown Enterprises	507	Creature Book	Not Genre-Specific	4th	1992	Both	
HERO System Advanced Player's Guide	Steven S. Long	DOJ, Inc. d/b/a Hero Games		Rules Supplement	Not Genre-Specific	6th	2009	Both	
HERO System Advanced Player's Guide II	Steven S. Long	DOJ, Inc. d/b/a Hero Games		Rules Supplement	Not Genre-Specific	6th	2011	Both	
HERO System Almanac I	Bruce Harlick (ed.)	Iron Crown Enterprises	508	Rules Supplement	Not Genre-Specific	4th	1993	Printed	
HERO System Almanac II	Bruce Harlick (ed.)	Iron Crown Enterprises	511	Rules Supplement	Not Genre-Specific	4th	1995	Printed	
HERO System Basic Rulebook	Steven S. Long	DOJ, Inc. d/b/a Hero Games		Rulebook	Core Rules	6th	2009	Both	
HERO System Bestiary	Michael J. Susko Jr.	Iron Crown Enterprises	25	Creature Book	Not Genre-Specific	3rd	1986	Printed	
HERO System Bestiary	Steven S. Long	DOJ, Inc. (d/b/a Hero Games)		Creature Book	Not Genre-Specific	5th	2002	Both	
HERO System Bestiary	Steven S. Long	DOJ, Inc. d/b/a Hero Games		Creature Book	Not Genre-Specific	6th	2010	Both	
HERO System Combat Handbook	Steven S. Long	DOJ, Inc. d/b/a Hero Games		Rulebook	Core Rules	5th	2005	Both	
HERO System Equipment Guide	Steven S. Long	DOJ, Inc. d/b/a Hero Games		Equipment Book	Not Genre-Specific	5th	2005	Both	
HERO System Equipment Guide	Steven S. Long	DOJ, Inc. d/b/a Hero Games		Equipment Book	Not Genre-Specific	6th	2011	Both	
HERO System Fifth Edition	Steven S. Long	DOJ, Inc. (d/b/a Hero Games)		Rulebook	Core Rules	5th	2002	Both	
HERO System Fifth Edition, Revised	Steven S. Long	DOJ, Inc. d/b/a Hero Games		Rulebook	Core Rules	5th	2004	Both	
HERO System Grimoire	Steven S. Long	DOJ, Inc. d/b/a Hero Games		Powers Book	Not Genre-Specific	6th	2011	Both	
HERO System Martial Arts	Steven S. Long & Michael Surbrook	DOJ, Inc. d/b/a Hero Games		Rules Supplement	Not Genre-Specific	6th	2010	Both	
HERO System Resource Kit	Steven S. Long, Andy Matthews, Ben Seeman, & Darren Watts	DOJ, Inc. (d/b/a Hero Games)		Playing Aid	Not Genre-Specific	5th	2002	Both	
HERO System Rulesbook	George MacDonald, Steve Peterson, & Rob Bell	Iron Crown Enterprises	500	Rulebook	Core Rules	4th	1990	Both	
HERO System Sidekick	Steven S. Long	DOJ, Inc. d/b/a Hero Games		Rulebook	Core Rules	5th	2004	Both	
HERO System Sixth Edition Volume 1: Character Creation	Steven S. Long	DOJ, Inc. d/b/a Hero Games		Rulebook	Core Rules	6th	2009	Both	
HERO System Sixth Edition Volume 2: Combat & Adventuring	Steven S. Long	DOJ, Inc. d/b/a Hero Games		Rulebook	Core Rules	6th	2009	Both	
HERO System Skills	Steven S. Long	DOJ, Inc. d/b/a Hero Games		Rules Supplement	Not Genre-Specific	6th	2010	PDF	
HERO System Vehicle Sourcebook	Steven S. Long	DOJ, Inc. d/b/a Hero Games		Equipment Book	Not Genre-Specific	5th	2004	Both	
Heroic Adventures Volume 1	Chris Avellone, Bruce Tong, & Jim Crocker	Gold Rush Games		Adventure Book	Champions	4th	1996	Printed	
Heroic Adventures Volume 2	Steven S. Long, Chris Avellone, Amy Crittenden, Greg Lloyd, Jim Crocker, & Ed Carmien	Gold Rush Games		Adventure Book	Dark Champions	4th	1996	Printed	
Hidden Lands	Darren Watts & Allen Thomas	DOJ, Inc. d/b/a Hero Games		Setting Expansion	Champions	5th	2005	Both	
High Tech Enemies	Sean Patrick Fannon	Iron Crown Enterprises	422	Enemies Book	Champions	4th	1992	Printed	
Horror Hero	Alan Dickerson, Robert O'Neal, John Tucker, & David Utter	Iron Crown Enterprises	509	Genre Book	Horror Hero	4th	1994	Printed	
Hudson City Blues	Edward J. Carmien	Iron Crown Enterprises	438	Adventure Book	Dark Champions	4th	1994	Printed	
Hudson City: The Urban Abyss	Steven S. Long	DOJ, Inc. d/b/a Hero Games		Campaign Setting	Dark Champions	5th	2004	Both	
Inner-Earth	Steven S. Long	DOJ, Inc. d/b/a Hero Games		Campaign Setting	Pulp Hero	5th	2005	Both	
Invaders from Below	Scott Paul Maykrantz	Iron Crown Enterprises	409	Adventure Book	Champions	4th	1990	Printed	
Invasions: Target Earth	Cyrus G. Harris	Iron Crown Enterprises	407	Adventure Book	Champions	4th	1990	Printed	
Justice, Inc.	Aaron Allston, Steve Peterson, & Michael A. Stackpole	Hero Games	13	Rulebook & Genre Book	Core Rules & Pulp Hero	3rd	1984	Printed	
Justice, Not Law	Steven S. Long	Iron Crown Enterprises	430	Campaign Setting	Dark Champions	4th	1993	Printed	
Kamarathin: Kingdom of Tursh	Jason Yarnell, Alec Rosenbilt, & David E. McGuire	Made by Jason		Campaign Setting	Fantasy Hero	6th	2008	Both	
Kamarathin: Herbalism in the Kingdom of Tursh	Paul Caughell	Made by Jason		Subgenre Book	Fantasy Hero	6th	2013	PDF	
Kamarathin: Pit Fighting in the Kingdom of Tursh	Jason Yarnell	Made by Jason		Organization Book	Fantasy Hero	6th	2011	PDF	
Kazei 5	Michael Surbrook	Hero Games		Campaign Setting	Cyber Hero	4th	1998	PDF	
Kazei 5	Michael Surbrook	BlackWyrm Games		Campaign Setting	Cyber Hero	6th	2009	Both	
King of the Mountain	Michael Satran	BlackWyrm Games		Adventure Book	Champions	6th	2012	Both	
Kingdom of Champions	Phil Masters	Iron Crown Enterprises	410	Setting Expansion	Champions	4th	1990	Printed	
Lands of Mystery	Aaron Allston	Hero Games	20	Campaign Setting	Pulp Hero	3rd	1985	Printed	
Larger Than Life	Michael Surbrook	High Rock Press		Characters Book	Champions	6th	2015	Both	
Lava Magic	Steven S. Long	Elvensong Street Press		Powers Book	Fantasy Hero	6th	2012	PDF	
Legions of Hell	Steven S. Long	Elvensong Street Press		Creature Book	Not Genre-Specific	6th	2012	PDF	
Lightning Magic	Steven S. Long	Elvensong Street Press		Powers Book	Fantasy Hero	6th	2012	PDF	
Lucha Libre HERO	Darren Watts & Jason Walters	DOJ, Inc. d/b/a Hero Games		Rulebook & Genre Book	Core Rules & Lucha Libre Hero	5th	2009	Both	
Lux Aeternum	Ryan Wolfe	BlackWyrm Games		Campaign Setting	Star Hero	6th	2011	Both	
Magic Items	David Berge, Barry A. Wilson, & Andrew Robinson	Iron Crown Enterprises	29	Equipment Book	Fantasy Hero	3rd	1987	Both	
Masterminds & Madmen	Rob Hudson	DOJ, Inc. d/b/a Hero Games		Enemies Book	Pulp Hero	5th	2005	Both	
Millennium City	Darren Watts	DOJ, Inc. d/b/a Hero Games	203	Setting Expansion	Champions	5th	2003	Both	
Millennium City University	Steven S. Long	DOJ, Inc. d/b/a Hero Games		Setting Expansion	Champions	5th	2008	PDF	
Mind Games	Scott Heine	Iron Crown Enterprises	402	Organization Book	Champions	4th	1989	Printed	
Monster Island	Steven S. Long	DOJ, Inc. d/b/a Hero Games		Setting Expansion	Champions	5th	2008	Both	
Monsters, Minions, & Marauders	Steven S. Long	DOJ, Inc. d/b/a Hero Games		Enemies Book	Fantasy Hero	5th	2003	Both	
More Guns!	Greg Porter	BTRC		Equipment Book	Not Genre-Specific	4th	1993	Printed	
Mugshots 2: Taking Care of Business	Michael A. Stackpole & Deb Wykle	Flying Buffalo		Characters Book	Dark Champions	4th	1992	Printed	
Murderer's Row	James Andrysik, David West, Cliff Christiansen, & Steven S. Long	Iron Crown Enterprises	433	Enemies Book	Dark Champions	4th	1994	Printed	
Mutant Madness!	Steven S. Long	DOJ, Inc. d/b/a Hero Games		Powers Book	Post-Apocalyptic Hero	6th	2011	PDF	
Mystic Masters	Allen Varney	Iron Crown Enterprises	405	Subgenre Book	Champions	4th	1989	Printed	
Mystic Menaces Fun Pack	Dean Shomshak & Allen Thomas	DOJ, Inc. d/b/a Hero Games		Enemies Book	Champions	5th	2004	PDF	
Nazi Death-Zombies Of The Congo!	Steven S. Long	DOJ, Inc. d/b/a Hero Games		Adventure Book	Pulp Hero	5th	2006	Both	
Neutral Ground	Rod Smith	Iron Crown Enterprises	47	Organization Book	Champions	3rd	1989	Printed	
New Bedlam Asylum	Chris Avellone	Hero Games		Organization Book	Dark Champions	4th	1998	PDF	
Ninja Hero	Aaron Allston	Iron Crown Enterprises	501	Rules Supplement & Genre Book	Ninja Hero	4th	1990	Printed	
Ninja Hero	Michael Surbrook	DOJ, Inc. (d/b/a Hero Games)		Genre Book	Ninja Hero	5th	2002	Printed	
Ninja Jamboree	Steven S. Long	DOJ, Inc. d/b/a Hero Games		Creature Book	Not Genre-Specific	6th	2010	PDF	
Nobles, Knights, & Necromancers	Steven S. Long	DOJ, Inc. d/b/a Hero Games		Enemies Book	Fantasy Hero	5th	2006	Both	
Normals Unbound	Brannon Boren & Patrick E. Bradley	Iron Crown Enterprises	420	Characters Book	Champions	4th	1992	Printed	
Omlevex	Cynthia Celeste Miller	Z-Man Games		Campaign Setting	Champions	5th	2004	Printed	
Pestilence Magic	Steven S. Long	Elvensong Street Press		Powers Book	Fantasy Hero	6th	2012	PDF	
Post-Apocalyptic Hero	Steven S. Long	DOJ, Inc. d/b/a Hero Games		Genre Book	Post-Apocalyptic Hero	5th	2007	Both	
Posthegemony	Jason Walters	BlackWyrm Games		Campaign Setting	Star Hero	6th	2011	Both	
Predators	Steven S. Long	DOJ, Inc. d/b/a Hero Games		Enemies Book	Dark Champions	5th	2005	Both	
Pretty Hate Machines	Michael Satran	BlackWyrm Games		Adventure Book	Champions	6th	2010	Both	
PRIMUS and DEMON	Andrew Robinson	Hero Games	18	Organization Book	Champions	3rd	1985	Printed	
PRIMUS	Shelley Chrystal Mactyre	Hero Games		Organization Book	Champions	4th	1998	PDF	
PS238 - The Roleplaying Game	Steven S. Long	DOJ, Inc. d/b/a Hero Games		Rulebook & Campaign Setting	Core Rules & Champions	5th	2008	Both	
Pterodactyls Over Broadway	Steven S. Long	DOJ, Inc. d/b/a Hero Games		Adventure Book	Pulp Hero	5th	2008	Both	
Pulp Hero	Steven S. Long	DOJ, Inc. d/b/a Hero Games		Genre Book	Pulp Hero	5th	2005	Both	
Pulp Hero Vehicle Sourcebook, Vol. 1	Steven S. Long	DOJ, Inc. d/b/a Hero Games		Equipment Book	Pulp Hero	5th	2005	PDF	
Pyramid in the Sky	Steve Metze	Iron Crown Enterprises	437	Adventure Book	Champions	4th	1994	Printed	
Ranger Magic	Steven S. Long	Elvensong Street Press		Powers Book	Fantasy Hero	6th	2012	PDF	
Reality Storm: When Worlds Collide	Darren Watts & Allen Thomas	DOJ, Inc. d/b/a Hero Games		Adventure Book	Champions	5th	2004	Printed	
Red Doom	David Rogers	Iron Crown Enterprises	39	Adventure Book	Champions	3rd	1988	Printed	
Rescue At Karadonna	Thomas Rafalski	Beautifulharmony Multimedia		Adventure Book	Star Hero	5th	2006	PDF	
Road Kill	Larry Johnson	Iron Crown Enterprises	415	Adventure Book	Champions	4th	1991	Printed	
Robot Gladiators	Steve Perrin	Iron Crown Enterprises	35	Adventure Book	Robot Warriors	3rd	1987	Printed	
Robot Warriors	Steve Perrin & George MacDonald	Iron Crown Enterprises	27	Rulebook & Genre Book	Core Rules & Robot Warriors	3rd	1986	Both	
S.H.A.D.O.W. Over Scotland	Derek Mathias	Iron Crown Enterprises	28	Adventure Book	Dark Champions	3rd	1986	Printed	
San Angelo: City of Heroes	Patrick Sweeney	Gold Rush Games		Campaign Setting	Champions	4th	1998	Printed	
Scourge From The Deep	Roger Lewis, Craig Thomas, & M.J. Wagner	Iron Crown Enterprises	40	Adventure Book	Champions	3rd	1988	Printed	
Scourges Of The Galaxy	Jason Walters	DOJ, Inc. d/b/a Hero Games		Enemies Book	Star Hero	5th	2008	Both	
Shades Of Black	Allen Thomas	DOJ, Inc. d/b/a Hero Games		Adventure Book	Champions	5th	2003	Both	
Shadow World Master Atlas	Terry K. Amthor	Iron Crown Enterprises	6000	Campaign Setting	Fantasy Hero	4th	1989	Printed	
Shadow World: Cyclops Vale	Timothy Taylor	Iron Crown Enterprises	6009	Setting Expansion	Fantasy Hero	4th	1989	Printed	
Shadow World: Demons of the Burning Night	Matthew Power	Iron Crown Enterprises	6003	Setting Expansion	Fantasy Hero	4th	1989	Printed	
Shadow World: Emer & Master Atlas Addendum	Terry K. Amthor	Iron Crown Enterprises	6100	Setting Expansion	Fantasy Hero	4th	1990	Printed	
Shadow World: Islands of the Oracle	John Crowdis	Iron Crown Enterprises	6011	Setting Expansion	Fantasy Hero	4th	1989	Printed	
Shadow World: Jaiman: Land of Twilight	Terry K. Amthor	Iron Crown Enterprises	6010	Setting Expansion	Fantasy Hero	4th	1989	Printed	
Shadow World: Journey to the Magic Isle	Timothy Taylor	Iron Crown Enterprises	6002	Setting Expansion	Fantasy Hero	4th	1989	Printed	
Shadow World: Kingdom of the Desert Jewel	Tod Foley	Iron Crown Enterprises	6007	Setting Expansion	Fantasy Hero	4th	1989	Printed	
Shadow World: Nomads of the Nine Nations	Brian E. Potter	Iron Crown Enterprises	6013	Setting Expansion	Fantasy Hero	4th	1990	Printed	
Shadow World: Norek: Intrigue in a City-State of Jaiman	Kevin Hosmer-Casey	Iron Crown Enterprises	6014	Setting Expansion	Fantasy Hero	4th	1990	Printed	
Shadow World: Quellbourne: Land of the Silver Mist	Daniel Henley & Margaret Henley	Iron Crown Enterprises	6001	Setting Expansion	Fantasy Hero	4th	1989	Printed	
Shadow World: Sky Giants of the Brass Stair	Tom Kane	Iron Crown Enterprises	6012	Setting Expansion	Fantasy Hero	4th	1990	Printed	
Shadow World: Star Crown Empire	Mike Cremer, Keith Humphreys, & Mike Sims	Iron Crown Enterprises	6005	Setting Expansion	Fantasy Hero	4th	1989	Printed	
Shadow World: Tales of the Loremasters	Thomas Kane	Iron Crown Enterprises	6004	Setting Expansion	Fantasy Hero	4th	1989	Printed	
Shadow World: Tales of the Loremasters, Book II	Tom Kane	Iron Crown Enterprises	6008	Setting Expansion	Fantasy Hero	4th	1989	Printed	
Shadow World: The Orgillion Horror	Timothy Taylor	Iron Crown Enterprises	6006	Setting Expansion	Fantasy Hero	4th	1989	Printed	
Shadows of the City	Scott Sigler	Iron Crown Enterprises	426	Adventure Book	Dark Champions	4th	1993	Printed	
Sharper Than A Serpent's Tooth	Allen Thomas	DOJ, Inc. d/b/a Hero Games		Adventure Book	Champions	5th	2004	Printed	
Solar Smith & the Sky-Pirates of Arcturus	Steven S. Long	DOJ, Inc. d/b/a Hero Games		Campaign Setting	Pulp Hero	5th	2005	PDF	
Spacer's Toolkit	Ben Seeman	DOJ, Inc. d/b/a Hero Games		Equipment Book	Star Hero	5th	2003	Printed	
Spears of the Tisangani	Steven S. Long	DOJ, Inc. d/b/a Hero Games		Adventure Book	Pulp Hero	5th	2005	Both	
Star Hero	Paula Woods & Sam Bowne	Iron Crown Enterprises	50	Rulebook & Genre Book	Core Rules & Star Hero	3rd	1989	Printed	
Star Hero	James Cambias & Steven S. Long	DOJ, Inc. (d/b/a Hero Games)		Genre Book	Star Hero	5th	2002	Both	
Star Hero	Steven S. Long	DOJ, Inc. d/b/a Hero Games		Genre Book	Star Hero	6th	2011	Both	
Stormhaven	Michael A. Stackpole	Flying Buffalo	3301	Adventure Book	Dark Champions	2nd	1983	Printed	
Strange Magics, Vol. 1: Voodoo	Steven S. Long	DOJ, Inc. d/b/a Hero Games		Powers Book	Pulp Hero	5th	2006	PDF	
Stronghold	Steven S. Long & John Lees	DOJ, Inc. d/b/a Hero Games		Organization Book	Champions	5th	2008	Both	
Super Agents	Aaron Allston	Iron Crown Enterprises	22	Subgenre Book	Champions	3rd	1986	Printed	
Target: Hero	David Matalon	Iron Crown Enterprises	34	Adventure Book	Champions	3rd	1987	Printed	
Teen Champions	Allen Thomas	DOJ, Inc. d/b/a Hero Games		Subgenre Book	Champions	5th	2005	Both	
Terracide	Grady F. Elliott	BlackWyrm Games		Campaign Setting	Star Hero	6th	2011	Both	
Terran Empire	James Cambias	DOJ, Inc. (d/b/a Hero Games)		Campaign Setting	Star Hero	5th	2003	Printed	
The Alchemy of Love	Steven S. Long	DOJ, Inc. d/b/a Hero Games		Adventure Book	Dark Champions	5th	2005	PDF	
The Algernon Files	Aaron Sullivan & Dave Mattingly, with Ben Davis, Rob Hall, & Ryan Wolfe	BlackWyrm Games		Campaign Setting	Champions	5th	2004	Both	
The Armory	Kevin Dockery	Firebird, Ltd.	N/A	Equipment Book	Not Genre-Specific	2nd	1983	Printed	
The Atlantean Age	Steven S. Long	DOJ, Inc. d/b/a Hero Games		Campaign Setting	Fantasy Hero	5th	2008	Both	
The Blood and Dr. McQuark	Aaron Allston & Patrick E. Bradley	Hero Games	21	Organization Book	Champions	3rd	1985	Printed	
The Book of Dragons	Steven S. Long	DOJ, Inc. d/b/a Hero Games		Creature Book	Fantasy Hero	5th	2009	Both	
The Books of the Undead, Volume 1: Skeletons	Steven S. Long	Elvensong Street Press		Creature Book	Fantasy Hero	6th	2012	PDF	
The Books of the Undead, Volume 2: Zombies	Steven S. Long	Elvensong Street Press		Creature Book	Fantasy Hero	6th	2012	PDF	
The Books of the Undead, Volume 3: Ghosts	Steven S. Long	Elvensong Street Press		Creature Book	Fantasy Hero	6th	2012	PDF	
The Books of the Undead, Volume 4: Mummies	Steven S. Long	Elvensong Street Press		Creature Book	Fantasy Hero	6th	2012	PDF	
The Books of the Undead, Volume 5: Ghouls	Steven S. Long	Elvensong Street Press		Creature Book	Fantasy Hero	6th	2012	PDF	
The Circle and M.E.T.E.	Aaron Allston	Hero Games	12	Organization Book	Champions	2nd	1983	Printed	
The Coriolis Effect	Dennis Mallonee	Iron Crown Enterprises	26	Adventure Book	Champions	3rd	1986	Printed	
The Crossroads Blues	Jason Walters	DOJ, Inc. d/b/a Hero Games		Adventure Book	Champions	6th	2010	PDF	
The Curse of the Vulture-God	Steven S. Long	DOJ, Inc. d/b/a Hero Games		Adventure Book	Pulp Hero	5th	2005	Both	
The Day After Ragnarok	Kenneth Hite	Atomic Overmind Press		Campaign Setting	Pulp Hero	5th	2009	Both	
The Dordogne Zodiac	Steven S. Long	DOJ, Inc. d/b/a Hero Games		Adventure Book	Pulp Hero	5th	2005	Both	
The Dragon Mandarin	Steven S. Long	DOJ, Inc. d/b/a Hero Games		Organization Book	Not Genre-Specific	5th	2005	PDF	
The Dragon's Gate: San Angelo's Chinatown	Richard Meyer, Adam Gratun, & Evan Jamieson	Gold Rush Games		Setting Expansion	Champions	4th	2001	PDF	
The Echoes of Heaven	Robert J. Defendi	Final Redoubt Press		Campaign Setting	Fantasy Hero	5th	2006	PDF	
The Echoes of Heaven: Bestiary	Robert J. Defendi	Final Redoubt Press		Creature Book	Fantasy Hero	5th	2007	PDF	
The Echoes of Heaven: On Corrupted Ground	Robert J. Defendi	Final Redoubt Press		Adventure Book	Fantasy Hero	5th	2007	PDF	
The Echoes of Heaven: The Festering Earth	Robert J. Defendi	Final Redoubt Press		Adventure Book	Fantasy Hero	5th	2006	PDF	
The Echoes of Heaven: The Last Free City	Robert J. Defendi	Final Redoubt Press		Setting Expansion	Fantasy Hero	5th	2006	PDF	
The Echoes of Heaven: The Lost Kingdom of the Dwarves	Robert J. Defendi	Final Redoubt Press		Setting Expansion	Fantasy Hero	5th	2007	PDF	
The Echoes of Heaven: The Tainted Tears	Robert J. Defendi	Final Redoubt Press		Adventure Book	Fantasy Hero	5th	2007	PDF	
The Echoes of Heaven: The Throne of God	Robert J. Defendi	Final Redoubt Press		Adventure Book	Fantasy Hero	5th	2006	PDF	
The Fantasy Codex: Volume One	Christopher Taylor	Kestrel Enterprises		Powers Book	Fantasy Hero	5th	2008	PDF	
The Fantasy Codex: Volume Two	Christopher Taylor	Kestrel Enterprises		Powers Book	Fantasy Hero	5th	2009	PDF	
The Fantasy Hero Grimoire	Steven S. Long	DOJ, Inc. d/b/a Hero Games		Powers Book	Fantasy Hero	5th	2003	Both	
The Fires of Heaven	Patrick Sweeney	BlackWyrm Games		Campaign Setting	Star Hero	6th	2012	Both	
The Fires of War: The Algernon Files, Volume 2	Dave Mattingly & Aaron Sullivan	BlackWyrm Games		Setting Expansion	Champions	5th	2005	Both	
The Grand Melee	Michael Surbrook	Evil Beagle Games		Setting Expansion	Fantasy Hero	6th	2016	PDF	
The Golden Age of Champions	Chris Cloutier	Firebird, Ltd.	N/A	Subgenre Book	Champions	3rd	1985	Printed	
The Golden Idol of Sikral	Steven S. Long	DOJ, Inc. d/b/a Hero Games		Adventure Book	Pulp Hero	5th	2005	Both	
The Great Super Villain Contest	Dennis Mallonee	Hero Games	11	Adventure Book	Champions	3rd	1984	Printed	
The Great White Hunter's Bestiary	Steven S. Long	DOJ, Inc. d/b/a Hero Games		Creature Book	Pulp Hero	6th	2009	PDF	
The Island of Dr. Destroyer	Steve Peterson & George MacDonald	Hero Games	03	Adventure Book	Champions	1st	1981	Printed	
The Jolrhos Bestiary	Christopher Taylor	Kestrel Enterprises		Creature Book	Fantasy Hero	5th	2008	PDF	
The Kandris Seal	Lisa Hartjes	Hartfelt Productions		Campaign Setting	Champions	5th	2002	PDF	
The Last Dominion	Randy Madden	Pencil Pushers Publishing		Campaign Setting	Fantasy Hero	5th	2005	PDF	
The Locomotive Pirates	Steven S. Long	DOJ, Inc. d/b/a Hero Games		Adventure Book	Pulp Hero	5th	2005	Both	
The Lost Castle	Christopher Taylor	Kestrel Enterprises		Adventure Book	Fantasy Hero	5th	2008	PDF	
The Malay Coins	Steven S. Long	DOJ, Inc. d/b/a Hero Games		Adventure Book	Pulp Hero	5th	2005	Both	
The Masques of Mithras	Steven S. Long	DOJ, Inc. d/b/a Hero Games		Adventure Book	Pulp Hero	6th	2010	PDF	
The Mutant File	Sean Patrick Fannon	Iron Crown Enterprises	428	Organization Book	Champions	4th	1993	Printed	
The Mystic World	Dean Shomshak	DOJ, Inc. d/b/a Hero Games		Setting Expansion	Champions	5th	2004	Both	
The Olympians	Kurt Dershem	Iron Crown Enterprises	414	Organization Book	Champions	4th	1990	Printed	
The Radio Marauders	Steven S. Long	DOJ, Inc. d/b/a Hero Games		Adventure Book	Pulp Hero	5th	2005	PDF	
The Raven & the Midnight Brigade	Steven S. Long	DOJ, Inc. d/b/a Hero Games		Organization Book	Pulp Hero	5th	2005	PDF	
The Spell Book	Aaron Allston & Mike Nystul	Iron Crown Enterprises	41	Powers Book	Fantasy Hero	3rd	1989	Both	
The Stronghold Files, Vol. 1	Steven S. Long	DOJ, Inc. d/b/a Hero Games		Enemies Book	Champions	5th	2008	PDF	
The Tablets Of Destiny	Steven S. Long	DOJ, Inc. d/b/a Hero Games		Adventure Book	Pulp Hero	5th	2006	Both	
The Turakian Age	Steven S. Long	DOJ, Inc. d/b/a Hero Games		Campaign Setting	Fantasy Hero	5th	2004	Both	
The Ultimate Base	Steven S. Long	DOJ, Inc. d/b/a Hero Games		Rules Supplement	Not Genre-Specific	6th	2009	Both	
The Ultimate Brick	David Rakonitz & Steven S. Long	DOJ, Inc. d/b/a Hero Games		Rules supplement	Not Genre-Specific	5th	2004	Both	
The Ultimate Energy Projector	Steven S. Long	DOJ, Inc. d/b/a Hero Games		Rules supplement	Not Genre-Specific	5th	2007	Both	
The Ultimate Martial Artist	Steven S. Long	Iron Crown Enterprises	510	Rules Supplement	Not Genre-Specific	4th	1994	Both	
The Ultimate Martial Artist	Steven S. Long	DOJ, Inc. (d/b/a Hero Games)		Rules Supplement	Not Genre-Specific	5th	2002	Both	
The Ultimate Mentalist	Steven S. Long	Iron Crown Enterprises	512	Rules Supplement	Not Genre-Specific	4th	1995	Both	
The Ultimate Mentalist	Steven S. Long	DOJ, Inc. d/b/a Hero Games		Rules supplement	Not Genre-Specific	5th	2006	Both	
The Ultimate Metamorph	Steve Metze & Steven S. Long	DOJ, Inc. d/b/a Hero Games		Rules supplement	Not Genre-Specific	5th	2005	Both	
The Ultimate Mystic	Dean Shomshak	DOJ, Inc. d/b/a Hero Games		Rules supplement	Not Genre-Specific	5th	2004	Both	
The Ultimate Skill	Steven S. Long	DOJ, Inc. d/b/a Hero Games		Rules supplement	Not Genre-Specific	5th	2006	Both	
The Ultimate Speedster	Marc R. Blumberg & Steven S. Long	DOJ, Inc. d/b/a Hero Games		Rules supplement	Not Genre-Specific	5th	2006	Both	
The Ultimate Super-Mage	Dean Shomshak	Hero Games		Rules Supplement	Champions	4th	1996	PDF	
The Ultimate Vehicle	Bob Greenwade & Steven S. Long	DOJ, Inc. (d/b/a Hero Games)		Rules Supplement	Not Genre-Specific	5th	2003	Both	
The UNTIL Superpowers Database	Steven S. Long	DOJ, Inc. d/b/a Hero Games		Powers Book	Champions	5th	2003	Both	
The Valdorian Age	Allen Thomas	DOJ, Inc. d/b/a Hero Games		Campaign Setting	Fantasy Hero	5th	2005	Printed	
The Voodoo Cross	Steven S. Long	DOJ, Inc. d/b/a Hero Games		Adventure Book	Pulp Hero	5th	2006	Both	
The Widening Gyre	Bill Keyes	BlackWyrm Games		Campaign Setting & Genre Book	The Widening Gyre	6th	2011	Both	
The Wreck of Alpha Central	Ian Harac	BlackWyrm Games		Campaign Setting	Star Hero	6th	2011	Both	
The Zodiac Conspiracy	Douglas Shuler	Iron Crown Enterprises	406	Organization Book	Champions	4th	1989	Printed	
Thrilling Hero Adventures	Steven S. Long	DOJ, Inc. d/b/a Hero Games		Adventure Book	Pulp Hero	5th	2009	Both	
Thrilling Places	Rob Hudson	DOJ, Inc. d/b/a Hero Games		Setting Expansion	Pulp Hero	5th	2006	Both	
To Serve & Protect	Scott Heine	Iron Crown Enterprises	44	Adventure Book	Champions	3rd	1988	Printed	
Trail of the Gold Spike	Aaron Allston	Hero Games	14	Adventure Book	Pulp Hero	3rd	1984	Printed	
Traveller Hero Book One	Rob Bruce, Kevin Walsh, & Randy Hollingsworth	ComStar Games		Campaign Setting	Star Hero	5th	2007	Both	
Traveller Hero Book Two	Rob Bruce, Kevin Walsh, & Randy Hollingsworth	ComStar Games		Campaign Setting	Star Hero	5th	2007	Both	
Traveller Hero: Golden Age Starships 1 - Fast Courier	Michael Taylor	ComStar Games		Equipment Book	Star Hero	5th	2007	PDF	
Traveller Hero: Golden Age Starships 2 - Sword Worlds Patrol Cruiser	Michael Taylor	ComStar Games		Equipment Book	Star Hero	5th	2007	PDF	
Traveller Hero: Golden Age Starships 3 - Archaic Small Craft, Launches, & Gigs	Michael Taylor	ComStar Games		Equipment Book	Star Hero	5th	2007	PDF	
Traveller Hero: Golden Age Starships 4 - Ship's Boats & Pinnaces	Ron Vutpakdi & Michael Taylor	ComStar Games		Equipment Book	Star Hero	5th	2007	PDF	
Traveller Hero: Golden Age Starships 5 - Cutters & Shuttles	Ron Vutpakdi & Michael Taylor	ComStar Games		Equipment Book	Star Hero	5th	2007	PDF	
Traveller Hero: Golden Age Starships 6 - Corsair	Michael Taylor	ComStar Games		Equipment Book	Star Hero	5th	2007	PDF	
Traveller Hero: Golden Age Starships 7 - LSP Modular Starship	Ron Vutpakdi & Michael Taylor	ComStar Games		Equipment Book	Star Hero	5th	2007	PDF	
Traveller Hero: Golden Age Starships 8 - Armed Free Trader	Michael Taylor	ComStar Games		Equipment Book	Star Hero	5th	2007	PDF	
Traveller Hero: Special Supplement 1 - Robots of Charted Space	Jason "Flynn" Kemp	ComStar Games		Equipment Book	Star Hero	5th	2007	PDF	
Traveller Hero: Special Supplement 2 - Robot Adventures	Jason "Flynn" Kemp	ComStar Games		Adventure Book	Star Hero	5th	2007	PDF	
Traveller Hero: Special Supplement 3 - Patron Encounters	Michael Taylor & William Andersen	ComStar Games		Adventure Book	Star Hero	5th	2007	PDF	
Traveller Hero: Special Supplement 4 - One Crowded Hour	William Andersen & Michael Taylor	ComStar Games		Equipment Book	Star Hero	5th	2007	PDF	
Traveller Hero: Special Supplement 5 - Short Adventures	Michael Taylor, William Andersen, & Ewan Quibell	ComStar Games		Equipment Book	Star Hero	5th	2007	PDF	
Trouble For Havoc	Yurek Chodak, Donald Harrington, Charles Huber, & Steve Perrin	Chaosium	2403	Adventure Book	Champions	3rd	1984	Printed	
Tuala Morn	Steven S. Long	DOJ, Inc. d/b/a Hero Games		Campaign Setting	Fantasy Hero	5th	2007	Both	
Ultimate Supermage Bestiary	Dean Shomshak	Hero Games		Creature Book	Champions	4th	1999	PDF	
Underworld Enemies	Chris Avellone	Iron Crown Enterprises	431	Enemies Book	Dark Champions	4th	1993	Printed	
Unkindness	Michael Satran	BlackWyrm Games		Adventure Book	Champions	6th	2010	Both	
Unknown Eagles	Donna Millheim & Edwin Millheim	Hero Games		Campaign Setting	Pulp Hero	4th	1998	PDF	
Unknown Eagles: Special Ops	Donna Millheim & Edwin Millheim	Hero Games		Adventure Book	Pulp Hero	4th	1998	PDF	
UNTIL Superpowers Database II	Steven S. Long	DOJ, Inc. d/b/a Hero Games		Powers Book	Champions	5th	2005	Both	
UNTIL: Defenders Of Freedom	Darren Watts & Steven S. Long	DOJ, Inc. d/b/a Hero Games		Organization Book	Champions	5th	2003	Both	
Urban Fantasy Hero	Steven S. Long	DOJ, Inc. d/b/a Hero Games		Subgenre Book	Fantasy Hero	5th	2008	Both	
USA-50 - Book of the West	Elliott Davis, Bob Greenwade	D3 Games		Campaign Setting	Champions	6th	2010	Both	
V.O.I.C.E. of Doom	Steve Perrin	Iron Crown Enterprises	38	Adventure Book	Champions	3rd	1987	Printed	
Valley Of The Spider Queen	Steven S. Long	DOJ, Inc. d/b/a Hero Games		Adventure Book	Pulp Hero	5th	2008	Both	
Vibora Bay	Darren Watts, Derek Hiemforth, Jason Walters, & Steven S. Long	DOJ, Inc. (d/b/a Hero Games)		Setting Expansion	Champions	5th	2004	Both	
Villains, Vandals, & Vermin	Steven S. Long	DOJ, Inc. d/b/a Hero Games		Enemies Book	Champions	5th	2007	Both	
Villainy Amok	Scott Bennie	DOJ, Inc. d/b/a Hero Games		Adventure Book	Champions	5th	2005	Both	
VIPER	Scott Bennie & Cliff Christiansen	Iron Crown Enterprises	425	Organization Book	Champions	4th	1993	Printed	
Viper: Coils of the Serpent	Scott Bennie & Steven S. Long	DOJ, Inc. d/b/a Hero Games		Organization Book	Champions	5th	2003	Both	
War of Worldcraft	Michael Satran	BlackWyrm Games		Adventure Book	Champions	6th	2009	Both	
Watchers of the Dragon	Steven S. Long	Iron Crown Enterprises	442	Adventure Book	Champions	4th	1995	Printed	
Western Hero	Matt Forbeck	Iron Crown Enterprises	504	Genre Book	Western Hero	4th	1991	Printed	
Widows & Orphans	Chris Avellone	Hero Games		Organization Book	Dark Champions	4th	1997	PDF	
Wings of the Valkyrie	Rob Bell	Iron Crown Enterprises	32	Adventure Book	Champions	3rd	1987	Printed	
Worlds Of Empire	Allen Thomas, Ben Seeman, Jason Walters, Steven S. Long, & Darren Watts	DOJ, Inc. d/b/a Hero Games		Setting Expansion	Star Hero	5th	2006	Both	
Wrath of the Seven Horsemen	Andrew Robinson	Iron Crown Enterprises	31	Adventure Book	Champions	3rd	1987	Printed	
You Gotta Have Character	Jason Walters	DOJ, Inc. d/b/a Hero Games		Characters Book	Not Genre-Specific	5th	2006	Both	

== See also ==
- Hero System
- Hero Games
