= Dark Champions: Heroes of Vengeance =

1993 role-playing game supplement

Cover art by Frank Cirocco and Storn Cook

Dark Champions: Heroes of Vengeance is a supplement published by Hero Games/Iron Crown Enterprises in 1993 for the superhero role-playing game Champions

== Gameplay ==
The original Champions role-playing game focuses on costumed superheroes who, like the popular comic book superheroes in the Justice League of America, stay on the side of good and use truth and justice to confront evil costumed supervillains, who are always captured alive so they can be convicted of their crimes and imprisoned.

But inspired by grim and gritty characters such as Punisher (Marvel Comics), Vigilante (DC Comics) and even Mack Bolan from The Executioner novel series, Dark Champions: Heroes of Vengeance is a campaign setting in which players create morally ambiguous street heroes who seek vengeance and are not averse to killing the targets of their wrath, acting as "judge, jury and executioner".

This supplement uses the Champions game (which itself uses the Hero System 4 rules set), although the combat and weapons are given revised optional rules. There is a chapter on the American judicial system, and profiles of criminal elements likely to serve as an adversary as well as profiles of various criminal organizations such as the Mafia and the Yakuza. The fictional "Hudson City" is used as a campaign setting.

Three scenarios are included in the book: a medium-length scenario, a short scenario, and one intended to serve as a backdrop for other adventures.

== Release ==
Hero Games released the popular superhero role-playing game Champions in 1981. Twelve years later, Steven S. Long twisted the superhero genre around by creating the gritty, violent Dark Champions: Heroes of Vengeance, a 205-page softcover book with cover art by Frank Cirocco and Storn Cook, and interior art by Dan Smith, and Greg Smith.

Several complementary supplements were released, including Hudson City Blues (1995). Goldtree Enterprises released Hudson City Sector 1 in 1995, a MS-DOS computer program to be used by the gamemaster to keep track of the scheduled activities of non-player characters and player characters within the setting of Hudson City. Critic Johnny Wilson noted "As a [gamemaster] who was constantly having to stop the flow of action in an evening's scenario to find that misplaced chart or character sheet, I really like having it all available on the computer."

When Hero Games released Hero System 5, the Dark Champions: Heroes of Vengeance campaign setting was shelved rather than upgraded. In 2004, Hero Games/Iron Crown Enterprises published a new game setting, Dark Champions, but this was entirely unrelated to the previous Dark Champions: Heroes of Vengeance, focusing instead on action-adventures similar to Indiana Jones and Lara Croft.

== Reception ==
Sean Holland reviewed Dark Champions in White Wolf #37 (July/Aug., 1993), rating it a 4 out of 5 and stated that "I found that Dark Champions was well-written and a useful addition to any Champions game. Even if you don't like the vigiliante genre, the book still has much to offer any Champions campaign. Anyone who likes the genre and Games Masters of other superhero RPGs should give it a look over."

In the September 1993 edition of Dragon (Issue 197), Allen Varney did not like the moral ambiguity of this book and only "reluctantly" called this book "the best supplement the Champions game has seen in years." Varney complimented the writing of Steven Long, saying, "Some individual sections of this book represent the best of their type the Hero line has yet seen." Varney concluded by asking "Does Dark Champions succeed in capturing gritty street-level vigilante adventures in game terms? Yes, brilliantly, not only for the Champions game but for many modern-day RPGs. Should players refuse to play this kind of campaign? I can’t make that call. Do I think Champions helps the super-hero gaming field? No, I absolutely do not. For those who disagree, this book gives excellent campaign value."

In Issue 9 of Shadis, Mark Arsenault disagreed with Varney, writing, "The subject of vigilante characters in Champions was deserving of its own book, since it deals with such a different aspect ... All in all this is an excellent sourcebook that contains something for every campaign! Whether or not you're wanting to run a gritty, street level campaign, this book will bring a wealth of information." Arsenault concluded with a strong recommendation, saying, "Of all the supplement books that Hero has published since Champions' 4th Edition, this book is far and away the best ever released. Not only does it provide an incredible amount of information and detail, but it also inspires, and deals with many of the issues that have likely arisen in your campaign! If you buy only one supplement for Champions, I suggest this one!"

In Issue 79 of the French games magazine Casus Belli, Jean Balczesak commented, "Dark Champions is distinguished by a rare maturity in the tone used. Well written, presented and organized, it addresses themes like morality and law with a surprising lucidity in the realm of 'political correctness'." Balczesak found the best part of the book to be "the section dealing with organized crime, which details in a succinct but very complete manner the history and functioning of the American Mafia, Japanese Yakuzas, Chinese and Jamaican gangs, etc." Balczesak concluded, "If you enjoy twisted storylines, tortured characters, and the gritty realism of our world, this is a supplement that will interest you, even if you've never heard of Champions before today. Great art!"

=== Other reviews and commentary ===
- Challenge #75 (1994)
