= Kingdom of Champions =

Tabletop role-playing game supplement

Cover art by Adam Hughes, 1990

Kingdom of Champions is a supplement published by Hero Games/Iron Crown Enterprises (I.C.E.) in 1990 for the superhero role-playing game Champions.

== Contents ==
Kingdom of Champions is a supplement which presents rules as well as guidelines intended to enable North American gamemasters to set a Champions campaign in the United Kingdom.

Information covered (relevant to 1990) includes

- geography
- major towns and cities
- transport
- major sites of interest such as the British Museum and Stonehenge that include maps
- petrol (gasoline) prices
- waterways
- current slang
- history
- race relations
- current politics
- "The Troubles" in Ireland
- various castles and manor houses
- tax rates
- the British legal system
- major religions
- the British educational system
- media such as TV channelsand newspapers
- popular cuisine
- bank holidays
- the British army and MI5
- British policing.

Specific role-playing content includes British magic and myth, 50 British heroes and villains, super agents, various hero and villain organizations, three short scenarios, and eight story hooks that can be developed into adventures.

== Publication history ==
Hero Games published the superhero role-playing game Champions in 1981. When Hero ran into financial difficulties, they formed an alliance with I.C.E., and together the two companies created the generic Hero System roleplaying rules. By 1990, they had also released the 4th edition of Champions.

In the 2014 book Designers & Dragons: The '80s, game historian Shannon Appelcline commented that during the partnership of Hero Games and Iron Crown Enterprises, "As usual, the majority of Hero System emphasis was on Champions supplements. There were more enemies, organizations, and adventures. The game also got its first major campaign setting sourcebooks, each based on individual Champions campaigns. Aaron Allston had already written about his own campaign world in the third edition as Aaron Allston's Strike Force (1988). Now Phil Masters described his British campaign in Kingdom of Champions (1990). Some books in this period were written by authors who would later have notable influence on the line: Steven S. Long wrote the sub-genre book Dark Champions (1993), as well as several additional sourcebooks in support, while Mark Arsenault co-authored Corporations (1994)."

Kingdom of Champions was a joint publication released in 1990 for the 4th edition of Champions, a 208-page softcover book written by Phil Masters, with interior illustrations by Ben Edlund, Albert Deschesne, and John Robinson, and cover art by Adam Hughes.

== Reception ==
In the August 1991 edition of Dragon (Issue #172), Allen Varney was impressed by this book, saying "Kingdom of Champions is that rare pleasure: a labor of true love. Bolstered by the breadth of imagination here, any GM can launch a one-shot scenario or any of several complete campaigns for super-heroes who cross the Atlantic." Varney complimented Phil Masters on his "clear style and subtle wit." He concluded, "With more works like this one, the super-hero role-playing field would be grander and more glorious, a miraculous place."

In the December 1990 – January 1991 issue of White Wolf, Sean Holland gave the product a generally positive review. He praised its utility "for any game set in the UK", and highly recommended it for Champions players. He rated the supplement a 4 out of 5 possible points.
