= Classic Enemies =

Role-playing game supplement

Classic Enemies is a supplement published by Hero Games/Iron Crown Enterprises (I.C.E.) in 1989 for the 4th edition of the superhero role-playing game Champions.

== Publication history ==
Classic Enemies is a 112-page softcover book edited by Scott Bennie, with a cover by George Pérez, and illustrations by Pat Zircher and Mark Williams.

== Contents ==
Classic Enemies contains detailed descriptions and game statistics for over 80 supervillains. Each has an individual illustration. Most of the villains appeared first in Enemies, Enemies II, or Enemies III.

The supervillain prison of Stronghold is also described.

== Reception ==
In the October 1990 edition of Dragon (Issue 162), Allen Varney gave a thumbs up, saying, "This book should be every Champions game GM's first supplement... If you run a four-color Champions campaign, you want this book."

Sean Holland reviewed Classic Enemies in White Wolf #25 (Feb./March, 1991), rating it a 4 out of 5 and stated that "I highly recommend Classic Enemies to anyone running a Champions campaign. And if you use another superhero RPG, you might want to riffle through Classic Enemies for a few ideas."
