= Foxbat (disambiguation) =

Foxbat may refer to:

== Aircraft ==
- Aeroprakt A-22 Foxbat, Ukrainian light-sport aircraft
- Manta Foxbat, American Ultralight aircraft
- Mikoyan-Gurevich MiG-25, Russian fighter jet

== Fiction ==
- Foxbat, an Inhuman from Marvel Comics
- Foxbat, character in the role-playing game Champions and its MMORPG adaptation
  - Foxbat Unhinged, a set of adventures centered around the character

== Other ==
- Foxbat (film), a 1977 action spy film
- Foxbat & Phantom, a boardgame
- King Biscuit Flower Hour Presents: Deep Purple in Concert, live album by Deep Purple, also released under the title "On the Wings of a Russian Foxbat"
