= The Ultimate Martial Artist =

Role-playing game supplement

The Ultimate Martial Artist is a 1994 role-playing supplement published by Hero Games.

== Contents ==
The Ultimate Martial Artist is a supplement in which various martial arts are detailed along with the types of campaigns they can be used in.

== Publication history ==
Shannon Appelcline noted by the early 1990s Hero Games began publishing sourcebooks which could be used with any genre in the Hero System, and "These included a second Hero Bestiary (1992), a couple of almanacs (1993, 1995) and the first two books in a line conceived of by Steve Peterson and initially authored by Steven S. Long: The Ultimate Martial Artist (1994) and The Ultimate Mentalist (1996)." Appelcline also noted that the company was having production difficulties starting in the late 1990s, and that the fifth edition of Hero System "was finished by Steven Long in July 1999 and turned in to Hero rather than Gold Rush because of the changing dynamics of the companies. Unfortunately this was just one of a few publications that failed to materialise in print, including a second edition of Champions: New Millennium and a second edition of The Ultimate Martial Artist".

== Reception ==
Sean Holland reviewed The Ultimate Martial Artist in White Wolf Inphobia #56 (June, 1995), rating it a 3 out of 5 and stated that "The Ultimate Martial Artist provides a wide variety of useful information for almost any Hero System game, even if the book's campaign is only a fragment. While much of the information was presented in the earlier (and now out of print?) Ninja Hero, there's a lot that's new. Overall, I recommend The Ultimate Martial Artist for anyone interested in exotic fights in the Hero universe."

== Reviews ==
- Dragon #221 (Sept., 1995)
- The Familiar (Issue 5 - Aug 1995)
