= Heroic Adventures Volume 1 =

Cover art by Storn Cook, 1996

Heroic Adventures Volume 1 is a collection of three adventures published under license by Gold Rush Games in 1996 for Hero Games' superhero role-playing games Champions and Dark Champions.

== Description ==
This book contains three full adventures for the Champions and Dark Champions RPGs:

1. "Throwing Stars and Bars" by Jim Crocker, with illustrations by Storn Cook: Supervillain Yo-Yo takes over Graceland and activates Presley-bots to defend it.
2. "Block Party" by Chris Avellone, with illustrations by Greg Smith: Some paranormals take over "the Block", an FBI training facility.
3. "Virtual Ice" by Bruce Tong, with illustrations by Storn Cook: Supervillain Null plans to steal the Jamil Diamond from the San Angelo Municipal Museum.

== Publication history ==
In 1981, Hero Games published the superhero role-playing game (RPG) Champions. By 1986, Hero Games was in financial difficulty, and entered into an agreement with Iron Crown Enterprises (I.C.E.) to help with printing and production. The following year I.C.E. also took over editorial control of all Hero Game products, and produced a 4th edition of the Hero System rules. During this period, I.C.E. licensed Gold Rush Games (GRG) to produce adventures for Champions. GRG's first product was Heroic Adventures Volume 1, a 96-page softcover book with cover art by Storn Cook.

In the 2014 book Designers & Dragons: The '80s, game historian Shannon Appelcline explained that Hero Games "licensed Mark Arsenault's Gold Rush Games to produce fourth edition Hero books. By the time of the Fuzion announcement GRG already had their first book out, Heroic Adventures 1 (1996). Two days later, on July 21, 1996, GRG also announced that they had purchased all the old Hero stock from ICE."

GRG also published a sequel, Heroic Adventures, Volume 2, in 1996.

== Reception ==
In the August 1996 edition of Dragon (Issue #232), Rick Swan thought the artwork was "hit or miss", and that "a few of the encounters are underdeveloped", but enjoyed the off-beat tone, saying that it "combines the excesses of Image Comics with the goofiness of Mad Magazine."

== Other reviews ==
- Fractal Spectrum #16 (Summer 1997, p. 11)
- The Familiar #9
