= The Spell Book =

1989 role-playing game supplement

The Spell Book is a 1989 role-playing game supplement published by Hero Games/Iron Crown Enterprises for Hero System.

== Contents ==
The Spell Book is a supplement in which a comprehensive supplement gathers several hundred magic spells alongside detailed rules for different forms of magic and guidance on weaving them into a campaign. Built for the Fantasy Hero system, it expands on its open‑ended approach to spellcasting, allowing players to design virtually any magical effect. Through its rules and essays, the book offers practical support and fresh insights to help players.

== Publication history ==
The Spell Book was written by Aaron Allston and published by Hero Games/Iron Crown Enterprises in 1988 as a 96-page book.

== Reception ==
Lawrence Schick commented that "Fantasy Hero magic is an open-ended system that allows players to design just about any magical effect, if they're willing to put in the effort. The rules and essays in The Spell Book provide players with new help at getting the most out of this complicated system."

== Reviews ==
- Dragon #147
- The Complete Guide to Role-Playing Games
