= Fantasy Hero Companion II =

Fantasy Hero Companion II is a 1992 role-playing supplement for Fantasy Hero published by Hero Games/Iron Crown Enterprises.

== Contents ==
Fantasy Hero Companion II is a supplement in which locations, magic, and guilds are detailed.

== Publication history ==
Shannon Appelcline noted when the Hero System received new genre supplements, "ICE never supported these individual genres - as Hero had rarely supported anything but Champions - with the only exceptions being Fantasy Hero Companion (1990) and Fantasy Hero Companion II (1992)."

== Reception ==
Sean Holland reviewed Fantasy Hero Companion II in White Wolf #32 (July/Aug., 1992), rating it a 3 out of 5 and stated that "Overall, the second Fantasy Hero Companion is useful for both players and GMs, but most helpful for the GM; if you play or GM Fantasy Hero then it is worth a look."
