= Super Agents =

Super Agents is a 1986 role-playing game supplement published by Hero Games / Iron Crown Enterprises for Champions.

== Contents ==
Super Agents is a supplement in which superspies are detailed with rules for skills, combat, superscience gear, headquarters construction, and full campaign support. It is also suitable to be used with Danger International.

== Publication history ==
Super Agents was written by Aaron Allston with a cover by Denis Loubet and published by Hero Games/Iron Crown Enterprises in 1986 as a 104-page book.

== Reviews ==
- Abyss #39 (Fall, 1986)
- Comics Feature #53
