= Invaders from Below =

Tabletop role-playing game supplement

Cover art by Jackson Guice and Alfred Ramirez

Invaders from Below is a supplement published by Hero Games / Iron Crown Enterprises (I.C.E.) in 1990 for the superhero role-playing game Champions.

== Contents ==
Invaders from Below is a supplement that details the underground campaign setting of Subterra, a cavern the size of Manhattan far below the surface of Earth, where King Earthwyrm and his subjects live. Some Subterrans have recently tunneled up to the surface and have discovered that they like the taste of human flesh, making an invasion imminent.

In addition to information about Subterrans and their society, the book includes eight short scenarios: four pre-invasion scenarios; and four invasion scenarios.

== Publication history ==
In 1981, Hero Games published the superhero role-playing game (RPG) Champions. Over the next five years, Hero Games published two more editions of Champions, but ran into financial difficulty, and was eventually taken over as a subsidiary of I.C.E. In 1989, Hero Games/I.C.E. published a fourth edition of Champions, and many adventures followed, including 1990's Invaders from Below, a 64-page softcover book written by Scott Paul Maykrantz, with interior illustrations by Colleen Doran, and cover art by Jackson Guice and Alfred Ramirez.

== Reception ==
Sean Holland reviewed the product in the February–March 1991 issue of White Wolf. He stated that "While I just did not care for Invaders from Below, it does have some interesting ideas and some exciting adventuring possibilities (your heroes, trapped miles beneath the Earth, must escape). If your campaign needs a major change of pace, or if you like Molemen, this might just be what you are looking for." He rated it overall 2 out of a possible 5 points.

== Reviews ==
- Adventurers Club Issue 16 (Summer 1990, p.4)
