= The Olympians (Champions) =

Super hero role-playing game supplement

Cover art by George Pérez

The Olympians is a supplement published by Hero Games/Iron Crown Enterprises in 1990 for the superhero role-playing game Champions.

== Contents ==
The Olympians is a supplement that allows the gamemaster to add gods of the Greek pantheon to their campaign. During ancient times, the Greek gods found themselves once again at war with the Titans and closed the portal to Olympus to protect Earth from the war. When the gods had defeated the Titans, they reopened the portal but found it now led to 20th century Earth. The cost to open the portal has left all the gods very weak. Thirteen gods are given full-page write-ups that include their game statistics.

Two long adventures and two short adventures are also included.

== Publication history ==
Hero Games first published the superhero role-playing game Champions in 1981, and then published many supplements and adventures for it, including The Olympians in 1990, a 44-page book written by Kurt Dershem, and illustrated by George Pérez, Jackie Sutherland, and Kevin Williams.

== Reception ==
In Issue 27 of White Wolf (June/July 1991), Sean Holland commented, "A beautiful cover by George Pérez graces the cover, and though the interior art is not up to the standards of the cover, it is still quite good." Holland found some of the descriptions of what the gods now did for work on Earth "most interesting", but found none of the four adventures included in this book exceptional. Holland concluded by giving this book a rating of 4 out of 5, saying, "I have problems with a few of the descriptions of the gods, but overall I am quite happy with this supplement and I recommend it for those who would like a mythical twist to their Champions campaign."

== Other reviews ==
- GamesMaster International (Issue 7 - Feb 1991)
