= Champions of the North =

1992 role-playing game supplement

Champions of the North is a 1992 role-playing supplement for Champions published by Hero Games/Iron Crown Enterprises.

== Contents ==
Champions of the North is a supplement in which Canada is detailed.

== Reception ==
Sean Holland reviewed Champions of the North in White Wolf #33 (Sept./Oct., 1992), rating it a 3 out of 5 and stated that "Champions of the North is a useful sourcebook if your campaign is set in or near Canada."

== Reviews ==
- White Wolf #35
