= The Coriolis Effect (Champions) =

Superhero role-playing game adventure

- Cover art by Denis Loubet
- Designers: Dennis Mallonee
- Illustrators: Denis Loubet
- Publishers: Hero Games/I.C.E.
- Publication: 1986
- Genres: Superhero RPG

The Coriolis Effect is an adventure published by Hero Games/Iron Crown Enterprises (I.C.E.) in 1986 for the superhero role-playing game Champions.

== Plot summary ==
The Coriolis Effect is a collection of short adventure scenarios focused on magic and interplanar travel. Doctor Clinton Avery, a professor of parapsychology, has been tasked with studying a mysterious scroll found in Turkey that can bind humans to the elements. The Black Enchantress seeks both the scroll and Avery's hidden secret. The player characters have been hired to protect Avery's special granddaughter.

The adventure unfolds as a series of interconnected scenarios, allowing the gamemaster flexibility in structure. Villain selection is left to gamemaster discretion, and additional non-player characters linked to the plot are included. Handwritten interior maps use a two-meter-per-hex scale.

== Publication history ==
Hero Games/Iron Crown Enterprises published the superhero role-playing game Champions in 1984, and followed this with a number of supplements and adventures. The fifth adventure, released in 1986, was The Coriolis Effect, a 32-page book written by Dennis Mallonee with a cover by Denis Loubet.

== Reception ==
In the Spring 1987 edition of Abyss, Dave Nalle commented, "the quality of the concept of this effort certainly sets it up apart from typical superhero fare." However, Nalle was disappointed that "it is designed for a party of regular Champions characters." Nalle also felt the scenario was designed for younger players. Nalle concluded, "All things considered this is one of the best superhero scenarios I've seen to date, combining original ideas, good plotting and interesting characters."

In Issue 46 of Different Worlds, Aaron Fichtelberg was disappointed, commenting, "All in all, this adventure is just not worth buying unless the gamemaster is willing to spend a lot of time fixing it up, and is ready to fill in the many blank spaces in the adventure. I'd recommend you save your money for comic books rather than spend it on this let down."

Lawrence Schick commented sarcastically on the plans of the Black Sorceress of "binding humans to the elements, whatever that means."

== Reviews ==
- Comics Feature #49
- Comics Feature #56
