= VIPER (Champions) =

VIPER is a 1993 role-playing supplement for Champions published by Hero Games/Iron Crown Enterprises.

== Contents ==
VIPER is a supplement in which the VIPER organization is detailed.

== Reception ==
Sean Holland reviewed VIPER in White Wolf #37 (July/Aug., 1993), rating it a 4 out of 5 and stated that "If you are a Champions games master, get this book! It is the best overview of a global criminal agency yet published. Even if you don't use VIPER in your campaign, the material can be easily adapted to other villainous agencies. If you are a game master of another superhero system, I recommend that you take a close look at the VIPER sourcebook for the reasons mentioned above. This is the sourcebook for a villainous agency in a superheroic world. Don't let the boss in green down."

== Reviews ==
- Dragon #201
- Shadis #11
