= PRIMUS and DEMON =

PRIMUS and DEMON is a 1985 role-playing game supplement published by Hero Games for Champions.

== Contents ==
PRIMUS and DEMON is a supplement in which Primus, the U.S. government's official hero group, and Demon, a society of villains that combines magic with technology, are described, including a five-part scenario involving both groups.

== Publication history ==
Primus & Demon was written by Andrew Robinson and published by Hero Games in 1985 as a 32-page book.

== Reviews ==
- Comics Feature #38
