= Challenges for Champions =

Super hero role-playing adventures

Cover art by Paul Smith

Challenges for Champions is a collection of adventures published by Hero Games/Iron Crown Enterprises in 1990 for the superhero role-playing game Champions.

== Description ==
Challenges for Champions begins with advice on how to design a scenario. A collection of ten short adventure scenarios follows:

- "Vanished"
- "A Serpent in our midst"
- "Monster!"
- "Soft Targets"
- "Bloody Revenge"
- "Strange Things"
- "Red Herring"
- "Mexican Standoff"
- "Fire and Ice"
- "Deathtrap"

The book also includes 19 pages of new supervillain opponents, and a map for a generic hero team base.

== Publication history ==
Hero Games first published the superhero role-playing game Champions in 1981, and then published many supplements and adventures for it, including Challenges for Champions, written by Andrew Robinson, with cover art by Paul Smith and interior illustrations by Albert Deschesne, It was published by Hero Games/Iron Crown Enterprises in 1989 as a 64-page book.

== Reception ==
In Issue 26 of White Wolf (April/May, 1991), Sean Holland commented, "All of the scenarios are set up to allow the GM to extensively tinker with them to suit their needs, or indeed change them entirely." Holland concluded by giving this book a rating of 4 out of 5, saying, "I highly recommend Challenges for Champions to any Champions GM, but perhaps especially to the beginning GM, because of its useful advice on how to create and run scenarios."
