= Deathstroke (disambiguation) =

Deathstroke may refer to:

- Deathstroke, a fictional character featured in DC Comics books
- Deathstroke, the name of multiple characters appearing in the Arrowverse television franchise:
  - Billy Wintergreen (Arrowverse)
  - Slade Wilson (Arrowverse)
  - Grant Wilson (Arrowverse)
  - John Diggle Jr.
- "Deathstroke" (Arrow episode), an episode of Arrow
- Deathstroke (Champions), an adventure for the role-playing game Champions
- "Deathstroke" (Titans episode)
- Deathstroke (Titans character)
