= Horror Hero =

Horror Hero is a 1994 role-playing supplement for Hero System published by Hero Games/Iron Crown Enterprises.

== Contents ==
Horror Hero is a supplement in which supernatural and horrors worlds are detailed.

== Publication history ==
Shannon Appelcline noted that after Hero System was published as a universal game system, full genre supplements were released, "The new genres included Ninja Hero (1990), Western Hero (1991), Cyber Hero (1993) and Horror Hero (1994)."

== Reception ==
Sean Holland reviewed Horror Hero in White Wolf Inphobia #50 (Dec., 1994), rating it a 4 out of 5 and stated that "Horror Hero is a good genre book, though I don't recommend it as the first campaign supplement for people new to the Hero System. For those of us who are familiar with the system, Horror Hero is a useful resource, whether you want to run a full-scale endless nightmare campaign or give the characters a few choice nightmares."
