= The Great Super Villain Contest =

Role-playing game adventure

The Great Super Villain Contest is a 1984 role-playing game adventure published by Hero Games for Champions.

== Contents ==
The Great Super Villain Contest is an adventure involving a huge competition between super-villains throughout the world.

== Reception ==
Allen Varney reviewed The Great Super Villain Contest in The Space Gamer No. 69. Varney commented that "you'll find The Great Super-Villain Contest exceptionally useful, rewarding, and high-power fun."

== Reviews ==
- Comics Feature #30
