= Normals Unbound =

Normals Unbound is a 1992 role-playing supplement for Champions published by Hero Games/Iron Crown Enterprises.

== Contents ==
Normals Unbound is a supplement in which non-superhuman characters are detailed.

== Reception ==
Sean Holland reviewed Normals Unbound in White Wolf #35 (March/April, 1993), rating it a 3 out of 5 and stated that "If you are tired of just playing the 'fight of the week' in your Champions game, I recommend Normals Unbound. This is a good book to facilitate roleplaying in a supers game; gamemasters of other super systems might want to take a look."

== Reviews ==
- Journeys: Journal of Multidimensional Roleplaying #6 (1993)
- Dragon #197 (Sept., 1993)
