= Allies (Champions) =

1993 role-playing game supplement

Allies is a 1993 role-playing game supplement published by Hero Games for Champions.

== Contents ==
Allies contains 50 new non-player characters (NPCs) intended for the Champions role-playing game. Forty-two of the characters are members of new teams of super heroes that include Executive Sanction, the Redeemed, the Flashmen, the Posse, the Braverman Foundation and the Zen Team. The remaining eight are solo characters. As noted by reviewer Allen Varney, these can be used by the referee as back-up teams available to the player characters; or, despite the title Allies, as rivals contesting for the same goal; or even as villains.

== Reception ==
Sean Holland reviewed Allies in White Wolf #39 (1994), rating it a 4 out of 5 and stated that "Overall, this is a useful book for any Champions gamemaster. Now that you have some help, go get those villains!"

In the December 1994 edition of Dragon (Issue #212), Allen Varney called this a "long-needed Champions game supplement [that can] flesh out your campaign with 50 super-powered NPC heroes, vigilantes, entrepreurs and wannabes." Varney found fault with "widely varying power levels, no proofreading, and that recurrent annoyance, the meaningless Psychological Limitation (“Strong regard for life”; “No sense of humor”)." However, Varney concluded that Allies should be part every referee's "vital toolkit for any four-colour Champions campaign."
