= The Zodiac Conspiracy =

Role-playing game supplement

The Zodiac Conspiracy is a supplement published by Hero Games/Iron Crown Enterprises in 1989 for the superhero role-playing game Champions.

Cover art by Neal Hanson

== Contents ==
The Zodiac Conspiracy is a supplement that details a group of twelve supervillains known as the Zodiac group, with each of the villains patterned on one of the astrological signs. The book also covers details of the supervillains' base, and the operation of their association.

== Publication history ==
The Zodiac Conspiracy is a 48-page saddle-stapled book designed and illustrated by Doug Shuler, with a cover by Neal "Spyder" Hanson, and was published by Hero Games/Iron Crown Enterprises in 1989.

== Reception ==
Sean Holland reviewed the product in the December 1990 – January 1991 issue of White Wolf. He stated that "I highly recommend The Zodiac Conspiracy to any and all Champions GMs, and if you play another superhero RPG, you should give it look as well; it's too good to miss." He rated it overall at 4 of 5 possible points.

== Reviews ==
- Alarums & Excursions #177 (May 1990, p. 57)
