= Gadgets! =

Gadgets! is a 1986 role-playing game supplement published by Hero Games / Iron Crown Enterprises for Champions.

== Contents ==
Gadgets! is a supplement in which rules are provided for using gadgets along with details on weapons, protective gear, movement aids, squad equipment, and security systems, also compatible with Danger International.

== Publication history ==
Gadgets was written by Andrew M. Robinson with a cover by Daniel R. Horne and published by Hero Games/Iron Crown Enterprises in 1986 as a 40-page book.

== Reviews ==
- Abyss #40 (Spring, 1987)
- Comics Feature #53
