= An Eye for an Eye (Champions) =

Role-playing game supplement

An Eye for an Eye is a 1994 role-playing supplement for Champions published by Hero Games/Iron Crown Enterprises.

== Contents ==
An Eye for an Eye is a supplement in which new skills, talents and powers are presented along with gamemastering advice and combat options.

== Reception ==
Sean Holland reviewed An Eye for an Eye in White Wolf Inphobia #55 (May, 1995), rating it a 4 out of 5 and stated that "An Eye for an Eye is packed with useful information for Dark Champions campaigns, and I recommend it for all Champions gamemasters. Its usefulness for players is limited; I recommend it only for players who are deeply committed to playing the game."

== Reviews ==
- The Familiar (Issue 1 - Dec 1994)
