= The Circle and M.E.T.E. =

Tabletop role-playing game supplement

The Circle and M.E.T.E. is a 1983 role-playing game supplement published by Hero Games for Champions.

== Contents ==
The Circle and M.E.T.E. is the first supplement in a series of Champions books which provide information on organizations that superhero player characters can interact with.

== Reception ==
William A. Barton reviewed The Circle and M.E.T.E. in The Space Gamer No. 72. Barton commented that "If the succeeding books in the Organization series are as good as this one, Hero Games should have some winners on its hands."

Russell Grant Collins reviewed The Circle and M.E.T.E. for Different Worlds magazine and stated that "All in all, I'd recommend this book to anyone who runs a superhero campaign and would like to have a group like either of these. I hope the people of Hero Games hurry out with future books in the series. How about some organizations for the other side of the law, like Hydra or the Monitor?"
