= European Enemies =

European Enemies is a 1991 role-playing supplement for Champions published by Hero Games/Iron Crown Enterprises.

== Contents ==
European Enemies is a supplement in which the supervillain groups Argent Anarky, Trial, and Eclipse are detailed, along with several Eastern European superheroes and a variety of individual supervillains.

== Reception ==
Sean Holland reviewed European Enemies in White Wolf #30 (Feb., 1992), rating it a 4 out of 5 and stated that "I find European Enemies is a good addition to the Champions range, and I highly recommend it to all Champions GMs."
