= Creatures of the Night: Horror Enemies =

Creatures of the Night: Horror Enemies is a 1993 role-playing supplement for Champions published by Hero Games/Iron Crown Enterprises.

== Contents ==
Creatures of the Night: Horror Enemies is a supplement in which around 50 new horror-based characters and creatures are provided as enemies.

== Reception ==
Sean Holland reviewed Creatures of the Night: Horror Enemies in White Wolf #42 (April, 1994), rating it a 4 out of 5 and stated that "Creatures of the Night is one of the best Enemies books to come out. I recommend it for any Champions Gamemaster."
