= Alien Enemies =

Superhero role-playing game supplement

Alien Enemies is a supplement published by Hero Games/Iron Crown Enterprises in 1990 for the superhero role-playing game Champions.

== Contents ==
Alien Enemies is a resource for gamemasters looking to quickly add interesting enemies to their Champions campaign. The book includes 29 detailed descriptions of individual supervillains of extraterrestrial origin, as well as six alien races and further information about the Metropolitan Extra-Terrestrial Enclave (METE).

== Publication history ==
Hero Games first published the superhero role-playing game Champions in 1981, and then published many supplements and adventures for it, including Alien Enemies in 1990, a 60-page book written by Scott Heine, and illustrated by Heine and Adam Hughes.

== Reception ==
In Issue 27 of White Wolf (June/July 1991), Sean Holland commented, "Aside from the rather garish cover, the artwork is quite nice." Holland found the most useful part of the book to be the extensive examination of METE. Holland concluded by giving the book a rating of 3 out of 5, saying, "I found Alien Enemies full of good ideas. I recommend it to any Champions GM who is using (or is going to use) aliens in their campaign, and GMs of other Superhero RPGs might find some good ideas here as well."

== Other reviews ==
- Papyrus (Issue 14 - April Fools 1994)
