= Invasions: Target Earth =

Tabletop role-playing game supplement

Cover art by Jackson Guice, 1990

Invasions: Target Earth is a supplement published by the Hero Games subsidiary of Iron Crown Enterprises (I.C.E.) in 1990 for the super-hero role-playing game Champions.

== Contents ==
Invasions: Target Earth shows Champions gamemasters how to plan a role-playing game storyline involving a large-scale invasion of Earth, either from space or from another dimension. This includes what types of aliens to use, from robots to demons, as well as setting up the invaders' command structure and firepower, and a complete timeline of the invasion.

The book also includes a 13-part scenario titled "The Invasion".

== Publication history ==
In 1981, Hero Games published the superhero role-playing game (RPG) Champions but ran into financial difficulty in the mid-1980s, and was eventually taken over as a subsidiary of I.C.E. In 1989, Hero Games/I.C.E. published a fourth edition of Champions, and many adventures and supplements followed, including 1990's Invasion, a 48-page softcover book written by Cyrus Harris, with interior art by Colleen Doran, and cover art by Jackson Guice.

== Reception ==
In the January 1991 edition of Dragon (#165), Allen Varney warned that "The scenario outlines here need fleshing out, but Invasions takes you a long way toward turning your campaign world upside down and righting it again." He concluded with a recommendation to buy this product, saying, "Start filling your game's skies with enemy ships."
