= The Blood and Dr. McQuark =

The Blood and Dr. McQuark is a 1985 role-playing game supplement published by Hero Games for Champions.

== Contents ==
The Blood and Dr. McQuark is a supplement in which a superpowered mutant group called The Blood and the support organization Dr. McQuark's are detailed, and includes brief adventure scenarios plus advanced character creation rules.

== Publication history ==
The Blood and Dr. McQuark was written by Aaron Allston and Patrick E. Bradley and published by Hero Games in 1985 as a 32-page book.

== Reviews ==
- Comics Feature #43
