= Shadows of the City =

Shadows of the City is a 1993 role-playing adventure for Champions published by Hero Games/Iron Crown Enterprises.

== Plot summary ==
Shadows of the City is an adventure in which three connected adventures can be used as a campaign.

== Reception ==
Sean Holland reviewed Shadows of the City in White Wolf #40 (1994), rating it a 3 out of 5 and stated that "This is a good product that's solidly presented. If you're about to start a Dark Champions campaign, try starting it in the shadows of the city."
