= Champions Presents =

1991 role-playing adventure for Champions

Champions Presents is a 1991 role-playing adventure for Champions published by Hero Games/Iron Crown Enterprises.

== Plot summary ==
Champions Presents is an adventure in which three adventure scenarios are included: "Spectrum", "No News of a Thaw", and "Menace Out of Time". The three scenarios in this 124 page softbound book can be woven into one grand campaign.

== Reception ==
Sean Holland reviewed Champions Presents in White Wolf #31 (May/June, 1992), rating it a 4 out of 5 and stated that "I think Champions Presents is an excellent book with a bit of just about everything (magic, demons, supertechnology, time travel, politics, dinosaurs), and it's cheaper then [sic] buying three adventures".

== Reviews ==
- The Gamer (Issue 2 - Mar 1992)
