= Classic Organizations =

Role-playing game supplement

Classic Organizations is a supplement published by Hero Games/Iron Crown Enterprises (I.C.E.) in 1991 for the superhero role-playing game Champions.

== Contents ==
Classic Organizations is a compilation of updated information about five organizations in the Champions universe derived from previously published material, including DEMON, CLOWN (Criminal Legion of Wacky Nonconformists), and Red Doom.

There are also 60 new heroes and villains, and 35 scenarios.

== Reception ==
Sean Holland reviewed Classic Organizations in White Wolf #30 (Feb., 1992), rating it a 4 out of 5 and stated that "The entire book is well written and illustrated, and a good addition to any Champions, or other superhero RPG campaign."

In the September 1992 edition of Dragon (Issue 185), Allen Varney gave the book "high marks for creativity." He gave the writers "brownie points for valiantly trying to update Red Doom, the Soviet super group, for the post-Cold War world" but pointed out that the then-recent dissolution of the Soviet Union made their efforts obsolete again. However, Swan concluded with a strong recommendation, saying, "Classic Organizations provides enough material to sate the most voracious campaign."
