= Roadkill (disambiguation) =

Roadkill is an animal or animals struck and killed by motor vehicles on highways.

Roadkill or Road Kill may also refer to:

== Film and television ==
=== Film ===
- Roadkill (1989 film), a Canadian comedy
- Road Kill (1999 film), an American action comedy film
- Road Kill (2001 film), UK title of American action thriller Joy Ride starring Paul Walker
- Road Kill (2010 film) or Road Train, an Australian horror road film
- Roadkill (2011 film), an American TV science fiction horror film

=== Television ===
- Roadkill (TV series), a 2020 British political drama series
- Roadkill (web series), an automotive-themed internet show

==== Episodes ====
- "Road Kill" (The Challenge: Fresh Meat II)
- "Roadkill" (Criminal Minds)
- "Road Kill" (Crossing Jordan)
- "Road Kill" (Dexter)
- "Road Kill" (In the Heat of the Night)
- "Roadkill" (Murder, She Wrote)
- "Road Kill" (NCIS)
- "Roadkill" (Supernatural)

== Music ==
=== Albums ===
- Road Kill (Groove Terminator album) (2000)
- Road Kill (The Haunted album) (2010)
- Roadkill (Kill the Drive album) (2006)
- Roadkill (Manilla Road album) (1988)
- Road Kill (Seven Nations album) (1998)
- Road Kill (video), a 1993 collection of live performances by Skid Row

=== Songs ===
- "Roadkill", a song by the Dickies from Idjit Savant (1990)
- "Roadkill", a song by Engerica (2005)
- "Roadkill", a song by KatieJane Garside as Lalleshwari from Lullabies in a Glass Wilderness (2007)
- "Roadkill", a song by Suede from The Blue Hour (2018)
- "Roadkill", a song by the 1975 from Notes on a Conditional Form (2020)

== Other uses ==
- Roadkill (video game), a 1994 car combat video game
- RoadKill (video game), a 2003 car combat video game
- Roadkill (wrestler) or Michael Depoli, American professional wrestler
- Road Kill (Champions), a 1991 adventure for the role-playing game Champions
- Roadkill cuisine
