= Magic Items =

Magic Items is a 1987 role-playing game supplement published by Hero Games/Iron Crown Enterprises for Hero System.

== Contents ==
Magic Items is a supplement in which a collection of enchanted artifacts is offered for Fantasy Hero. It includes find dozens of magical creations, ranging from powerful arms and armor to subtle minor items, specialized tools for wizards, and even enchanted places. The supplement also introduces new rules and guidelines for incorporating magic items into adventures.

== Publication history ==
Magic Items was written by David Berge, Barry A. Wilson, and Andrew Robinson, with a cover by Walter Velez and was published by Hero Games/Iron Crown Enterprises in 1987 as a 48-page book.
