= To Serve and Protect (Champions) =

Tabletop role-playing game adventure

To Serve and Protect is a 1988 role-playing game adventure published by Hero Games for Champions.

== Contents ==
To Serve and Protect is a mini-series adventure in which a team of superheroes goes rogue.

== Reception ==
David Rogers reviewed To Serve and Protect in Space Gamer/Fantasy Gamer No. 84. Rogers commented that "I recommend this book, with reservations. The heros and villains are interesting and useful outside the context of this adventure, though you may want to use some of the heros as bad guys, since it seems to make sense in some cases. The hero base and skycruiser, the museum and agency are also useful in other contexts, and the main evil-doer is interesting enough to return for further villainy."
