= Cyber Hero =

Cyber Hero is a 1992 role-playing supplement for Hero System published by Hero Games/Iron Crown Enterprises.

== Contents ==
Cyber Hero is a supplement in which a campaign book explores the cyberpunk genre.

== Publication history ==
Shannon Appelcline noted that after Hero System was published as a universal game system, full genre supplements were released, "The new genres included Ninja Hero (1990), Western Hero (1991), Cyber Hero (1993) and Horror Hero (1994). Matt Forbeck's Western Hero was a notable experiment among these releases because it was a near copy of the Rolemaster genre book Outlaw (1991). By this time ICE was no longer publishing the dual-statted Campaign Classics but they still made this final attempt to share resources between the two games."

== Reception ==
Sean Holland reviewed CyberHero in White Wolf #34 (Jan./Feb., 1993), rating it a 3 out of 5 and stated that "Cyber Hero is a solid addition to the Hero System, and if you are a fan it is well worth a look. For players of other cyberpunk-type games there are a few good ideas, but probably not enough to make it worthwhile for you to buy this book as a reference source."

== Reviews ==
- White Wolf #35
- Challenge #75 (1994)
