= Underworld Enemies =

Underworld Enemies is a 1993 role-playing supplement for Champions published by Hero Games/Iron Crown Enterprises.

== Contents ==
Underworld Enemies is a supplement in which 30 villains and other characters are presented.

== Reception ==
Sean Holland reviewed Underworld Enemies in White Wolf Inphobia #50 (Dec., 1994), rating it a 3 out of 5 and stated that "This book is a useful addition to a Dark Champions campaign, but of only limited utility in a more traditional superhero campaign."

== Reviews ==
- The Familiar (Issue 1 - Dec 1994)
