= Golden Age Champions =

Golden Age Champions is a 1994 role-playing supplement for Champions published by Hero Games/Iron Crown Enterprises.

== Contents ==
Golden Age Champions is a supplement in which a campaign book details superheroes for the era known as the Golden Age of Comic Books.

== Reception ==
Sean Holland reviewed Golden Age Champions in White Wolf Inphobia #57 (July, 1995), rating it a 3.5 out of 5 and stated that "A few typos and a missing character [...] mar this book, but overall it's packed with useful information about the war and American society at the time. For those interested in playing in the Golden Age (even if only or a change of pace), I highly recommend Golden Age Champions. Now get out there and smash those Nazis!"

== Reviews ==
- The Familiar (Issue 3 - Apr 1995)
- Valkyrie (Volume 1, Issue 4 - Dec 1994)
