= Darren Watts =

Game designer (1969–2022)

- Born: February 17, 1969
- Died: December 31, 2022 (aged 53)
- Occupation: RPG developer

Darren Watts (February 17, 1969 – December 31, 2022) was an American game designer who was one of the founders (along with Steve Long) of DOJ Inc. and the president of Hero Games, publishers of roleplaying games using the Hero System such as Champions, Fantasy Hero and Star Hero. He contributed to multiple conventions for Double Exposure, podcasts such as Explain This, Comics Guys!, and wrote, contributed, and edited many other RPGs.

== Life and career ==
Darren Watts named his company DOJ, after his Golden Age era Champions game, which was known as the "Defenders of Justice". DOJ bought the Hero Games rights and assets from Cybergames, Inc. on December 19, 2001. Watts was the president and co-owner of Hero Games.

Watts wrote or co-wrote (among others) Champions Universe, Millennium City, UNTIL: Defenders Of Freedom, Champions Worldwide, and Lucha Hero, the RPG of Mexican wrestling and monster movies. He also has a supplement for the Doctor Who – Adventures in Time and Space: The Roleplaying Game featuring the Fifth Doctor in the works for Cubicle 7. Darren also worked behind the scenes for many publishers, including Chaosium, where he provided recent editorial support on the 7th Sea novels and the latest edition of Phyllis Ann Karr’s The Arthurian Companion.

Watts was known in industry circles as a community builder with a strong desire to improve the quality of the games we all publish and play, but also the social conditions that underpin their creation. Darren’s most lasting impact on the tabletop community may come from the hours and effort he devoted to supporting smaller publishers and independent creators, helping them craft better games and find their audience through his work with Indie Press Revolution, local gaming conventions, the Metatopia Game Design Festival, and the First Exposure Playtest Hall at Gen Con.

Watts died from complications of a heart attack on December 31, 2022, at the age of 53.

== Selected works ==
- The Atlantean Age (editor, 2008)
- Book of the Destroyer (editor, 2008)
- The Book of Dragons (editor, 2009)
- Book of the Empress (editor, 2012)
- Book of the Machine (editor, 2009)
- Champions (25th Anniversary Edition) (editor, 2006)
- Champions Battlegrounds (editor, 2003)
- Champions Beyond (editor, 2011)
- Champions: Live Action (2012)
- Champions Powers (editor, 2010)
- Champions Universe (5th Edition) (2002)
- Champions Universe (6th Edition) (2010)
- Champions Universe: News Of The World (2007)
- Champions Villains Volume One: Master Villains (additional contributions, 2010)
- Champions Villains Volume Two: Villain Teams (additional contributions, 2010)
- Champions Villains Volume Three: Solo Villains (additional contributions, 2010)
- Champions Worldwide (2005)
- Conquerors, Killers, And Crooks (2002)
- Cops, Crews, and Cabals (editor, 2007)
- The Eighth Doctor Sourcebook (2015)
- Evil Unleashed (2006)
- Fantasy Hero (5th Edition) (editor, 2003)
- Fantasy Hero (6th Edition) (editor, 2010)
- The Fifth Doctor Sourcebook (2014)
- Galactic Champions (2004)
- Golden Age Champions (2017)
- Hero System (5th Edition) (2002)
- Hero System (5th Edition Revised) (2004)
- Hero System Advanced Players Guide II (editor, 2011)
- Hero System Bestiary (6th Edition) (editor, 2010)
- Hero System Equipment Guide (editor, 2010)
- Hero System Grimoire (editor, 2010)
- Hero System Resource Kit (5th Edition) (2003)
- Hero System Skills (editor, 2010)
- Hidden Lands (2005)
- Lucha Libre Hero (2009)
- Millennium City (2003)
- Monster Island (editor, 2008)
- Nobles, Knights, And Necromancers (editor, 2006)
- Post-Apocalyptic Hero (2007)
- PS238: The Roleplaying Game (editor, 2008)
- Raiders of the Lost Artifacts: Original Edition Rules for Fantastic Archaeological Adventures (2017)
- Spacers Toolkit (editor, 2003)
- Thrilling Hero Adventures (editor, 2009)
- Tuala Morn: A Realm Of Celtic Wonder and Magic (editor, 2007)
- The Ultimate Base (editor, 2009)
- The Ultimate Energy Projector (editor, 2007)
- The Ultimate Martial Artist (editor, 2002)
- The Ultimate Mentalist (editor, 2006)
- The Ultimate Skill (editor, 2006)
- UNTIL: Defenders Of Freedom (2003)
- UNTIL Superpowers Database (editor, 2001)
- UNTIL Superpowers Database (Revised) (editor, 2003)
- UNTIL Superpowers Database II (2005)
- Urban Fantasy Hero (editor, 2008)
- Vibora Bay (2004)
- Villains, Vandals, and Vermin (editor, 2007)
- We Rate Dogs! The Card Game (2019)
- Worlds of Empire (2006)
