= Demons Rule =

Superhero role-playing game adventure

Demons Rule is an adventure published by Hero Games/Iron Crown Enterprises (ICE) in 1990 for the 4th edition of the superhero role-playing game Champions.

== Plot summary ==
The Demons street gang, who may have superpowers, has appeared on the streets of the city, and the heroes have up to 11 encounters with them. The heroes can spend some time researching this new gang before the book moves into the core adventure, where the heroes must prevent the Demons from getting their hands on a set of magical artifacts. This leads to a final battle where the Demons attempt to open a magical gate.

== Publication history ==
Hero Games first published the superhero role-playing game Champions in 1981, and regularly refreshed it with new editions as well as many supplements and adventures including Demons Rule, written by Charles Brown, with illustrations by Ted Boonthanakit and Joven Chacon. It was published as a 30-page folio by Hero Games/ICE in 1990.

== Reception ==
In Issue 26 of White Wolf (April/May, 1991), Sean Holland rated it 3 out of 5, saying, "All in all, Demons Rule is a good solid adventure with several good ideas and chances for roleplaying. It's worth a look if you play Champions, or if you play another superhero RPG and are interested in a brush with the supernatural."

== Other recognition ==
A copy of Demons Rule is held in the Edwin and Terry Murray Collection of Role-Playing Games at Duke University.

== Other reviews ==
- Papyrus (Issue 15 - Gencon 1994)
