= Champions Gamemaster's Screen =

1981 role-playing game supplement for Champions

Champions Gamemaster's Screen is a 1981 role-playing game supplement for Champions published by Hero Games.

== Contents ==
Champions Gamemaster's Screen is a pair of stand-up gamemaster's screens screens that contain charts and tables for playing Champions.

Gamemaster's Screen for Champions is a GM's screen with charts and tables from the 1st-ed. rules. Gamemaster's Screen is a GM's screen displaying 3rd-ed. Combat charts for quick reference; it includes a scenario ("Adventure #1"), The Island of Dr. Destroyer (previously sold separately).

== Publication history ==
Gamemaster's Screen for Champions was designed by Steve Peterson and George MacDonald, and was published by Hero Games, in 1981 as two cardstock screens. Gamemaster's Screen was published in 1985 as a cardstock screen with a 16-page bound-in pamphlet.

== Reception ==
Aaron Allston reviewed Champions Gamemaster's Screen in The Space Gamer No. 51. Allston commented that "GMs who really want a good-looking cardstock screen should pick this up; misers (like me) will improvise."
