= Enemies III =

Superhero role-playing game supplement

- Cover art by Mike Witherby
- Designers: David Berge; Dennis Mallonee; Andrew Robinson
- Illustrators: Mike Witherby
- Publishers: Hero Games
- Publication: 1984
- Genres: Superhero

Enemies III is a supplement published by Hero Games in 1984 for the superhero role-playing game Champions.

== Contents ==
Enemies III provides game statistics for twenty-seven super-villains. Each has a separate page, with long descriptions of the villain's methods and motivations, as well as costume and equipment. Also included is a full index of Champions villains.

== Publication history ==
In 1981, Hero Games published the superhero role-playing game Champions and followed this up with several adventures and supplements. One of these was Enemies III, written by David Berge, Dennis Mallonee, and Andrew Robinson, and published by Hero Games in 1985 as a 32-page book with art by Mike Witherby.

== Reception ==
In Issue 73 of The Space Gamer, Allen Varney commented, "What's to say, really, about an Enemies supplement? Either you want it or you don't. This is a pretty good job."

In Issue 35 of Comics Feature, Steve Perrin liked the level of detail, found there were some differences in structure and rules from previous Champions publications. Despite this, Perrin concluded, "In all, it is an interesting book, with several good villains of differing difficulty levels for any Champions campaign."
