= Deathstroke (Champions) =

Tabletop role-playing game adventure

Cover art by Mark Williams, 1983

Deathstroke is an adventure published by Hero Games in 1983 for the superhero role-playing game Champions.

== Plot summary ==
The adventure is divided into three chapters. In the first, the superheroes are called in when a band of supervillains called Deathstroke rob a bank and take hostages. In the second chapter, investigation by the superheroes will reveal that Deathstroke used the bank robbery as a diversion in order to steal an experimental isotope, which they will use to build a superweapon. In the third chapter, the superheroes raid Deathstroke's headquarters.

== Publication history ==
Hero Games first published the Champions superhero role-playing game in 1981. The game's third adventure, Deathstroke, published in 1983, is a 24-page softcover book written by Kevin Dinapoli and illustrated by Mark Williams.

== Reception ==
Russell Grant Collins reviewed Deathstroke for Different Worlds magazine and stated that "All in all, you get a couple of good hours play and some new background for your campaign with this scenario and I heartily recommend it to Champions gamemasters everywhere. If you play Villains And Vigilantes or Superworld, or one of the other superhero games, there is some pretty good material in here for you as well, if you are willing to take the trouble to convert it over."

Pete Tamlyn reviewed Deathstroke for Imagine magazine, and stated that "Deathstroke has a certain amount of subtlety and complexity to it. It also provides full backgrounds for the baddies (despite the fact that they were nearly all featured in Enemies II). In addition it suggests that players control the villains as well and provides as much of a challenge for them as for the goodies. This is a very interesting departure, though while the designers say that it works well, I have my doubts about the ease of running such an operation."
