= Border Crossing (adventure) =

Border Crossing is a 1983 role-playing game adventure for Espionage! published by Hero Games.

== Plot summary ==
Border Crossing is an adventure in which the player characters sneak across the border with East Germany to investigate a location, and sneak back across the border.

== Reception ==
Nick Davison reviewed Border Crossing for Imagine magazine, and stated that "It is not really a 'combat' scenario, which makes it unsuitable for many players and GMs. Rather the emphasis is on getting to the objective and back without causing trouble. Nevertheless, the detail is impressive."

Marcus L. Rowland reviewed Border Crossing for White Dwarf #54, giving it an overall rating of 9 out of 10, and stated that "Border Crossing shows the potential of the system, and could really work with almost any game of the type. It's odd that nothing so sensible has appeared before."

Greg Porter reviewed Border Crossing in Space Gamer No. 73. Porter commented that "Border Crossing is well-written, with enough challenges and variations to keep even the best agents on their toes. The layout makes it easy to find the tables and maps needed, and the background information makes it a useful tool for any GM running Eastern Bloc scenarios. It's well worth the money."
