= Ninja Hero =

Ninja Hero is a supplement for Hero System, published by Hero Games.

== Publication history ==
In 1989, Hero Game released Ninja Hero, a 176-page softcover book designed by Aaron Allston, with cover art by Jackson Guice, as a supplement for the 4th edition of Hero System.

In 2003, the revised book, written by Mike Surbrook, was released as a supplement to the 5th edition of the Hero System.

== Contents ==
Ninja Hero introduces rules for martial arts. In the 4th edition two dozen styles of martial arts are described, as well as 15 substyles of kung fu. This allows a player to create a character that specialized in one or more forms. Other subjects covered include:

- A system for designing new martial arts maneuvers.
- How to fight in enclosed spaces or in zero gravity.
- Lists of weapons and gadgets.
- Several scenarios.

The 5th edition book consists entirely of genre material, further subdivided by campaign style in addition to power level.

== Reception ==
In the October 1990 edition (Issue 162) of Dragon, Allen Varney called the 4th edition book "an exhaustive treatise on martial arts as they exist both in reality and in free-wheeling kung fu movies." He thought the included scenarios were "among the best Hero Games has published." He concluded "If the topic interests you, see this one for yourself. The quality shines through."
