= Road Kill (Champions) =

Tabletop role-playing game adventure

Road Kill is a 1991 role-playing adventure for Champions published by Hero Games/Iron Crown Enterprises.

== Plot summary ==
Road Kill is an adventure in which the heavy metal band Road Kill are supervillains looking for revenge. The book begins with a brief introduction followed by "Rock & Revenge," a short adventure featuring a combat scene with a collapsing building and innocent civilians to save. The main campaign consists of linked adventures starting with "Crimes against Music," where the player characters must save the pop group Young Virile Teens from execution by Road Kill. After this scenario, Road Kill embarks on an illegal Hostage Tour, leading to the "Awesome Amp" scenario involving the theft of a sonic dampener from Wave-Tech Inc. The final scenario, "Ballad of Control," features a climactic clash where heroes must stop Road Kill from using a sonic mind control device to incite their fans to rampage. The adventure section concludes with ideas for further adventures.

The six members of Road Kill are:

- Heavy Metal: Lead singer with sonic powers.
- Ted: Drummer with incredible strength.
- The Axeman: Guitarist with an axe-shaped guitar.
- Boomer: Martial artist with a sonic field projector.
- Screech: Gadgeteer with a dangerous keyboard.
- Sparks: Special effects handler.

Additional stats are provided for the band's manager, their roadie robots, and the Road Kill hovervan.

== Publication history ==
Road Kill was published as a 29-page book, with five maps included, and features interior artwork by Patrick Zircher and cover art by Ben Dunn.

== Reception ==
Sean Holland reviewed Road Kill in White Wolf #28 (Aug./Sept., 1991), rating it a 3 out of 5 and stated that "Overall, I found Road Kill and interesting supplement with some excellent ideas, although the villains come across as a bit flat. But if you want a head banging Champions adventure, this one's for you."

== Reviews ==
- Papyrus (Issue 15 - Gencon 1994)
