= The Golden Age of Champions =

The Golden Age of Champions is a 1985 role-playing game supplement published by Firebird Ltd. for Champions.

== Contents ==
The Golden Age of Champions is a supplement in which 1940s superheroes are covered, and introduces new skills, powers, and rules, while providing villain descriptions and period sourcebook material.

== Publication history ==
The Golden Age of Champions was written by Chris Cloutier, Robert Schroeder, and Tim Lasko and published by Firebird Ltd. in 1985 as a 96-page book.

Shannon Appelcline, in his book Designers & Dragons, noted that in its early years, "Hero Games had a very liberal attitude toward licensing [...] Cardboard Heroes from Steve Jackson, miniatures from Grenadier and the fully licensed Golden Age of Champions (1985) from Firebird Ltd. were some of the more official licenses that Hero did."

== Reviews ==
- Comics Feature #37
- Game News (Issue 8 - Oct 1985)
