= Foxbat Unhinged =

Role-playing game supplement

Foxbat Unhinged is a set of adventures centered around super-villain Foxbat that was published by Atlas Games in 1996 for the superhero role-playing game Champions.

== Description ==
Foxbat Unhinged is a 32-page book written by Alison Brooks and Scott Bennie, with artwork by C. Brent Ferguson, Scott Ruggels, and Doug Shuler. The book contains two adventures for the Champions role-playing game, both featuring the super-villain Foxbat: "Cinderella", and "Al-Foxbat." The book also includes scenario ideas and statistics for gadgets used by Foxbat.

== Reception ==
In the August 1996 edition of Arcane (Issue #9), Andrew Rilstone was ambivalent about Foxbat Unhinged, saying, "If you are running the sort of four-colour campaign that can cope with the injection of some serious weirdness, this book is certainly worth a glance. Whether it is actually worth spending [the money] on 30 pages of large type is another question." Rilstone concluded by giving the book a below-average rating of 6 out of 10.

In the September 1996 edition of Dragon (Issue #233), Rick Swan called the book "a brisk action-stuffed adventure that captures the zaniness of early Marvel Comics."
