= Steven S. Long =

Role-playing game designer

- Education: Duke University School of Law
- Occupation: Role-playing game designer
- Known for: Owner of Hero Games

Steven S. Long is a role-playing game author and one of the owners of Hero Games.

== Career ==
Long started playing Champions in 1982. He began writing for the game ten years later, starting with articles in the Hero Games house magazine, Adventurers Club. He began working in the RPG industry in 1992 as a freelancer for Hero Games. Long authored the Champions subgenre sourcebook Dark Champions in 1993, along with several more Champions supplements to support it. Long wrote The Ultimate Martial Artist (1994) and The Ultimate Mentalist (1996) as the first two supplements in a line devised by Steve Peterson as sourcebooks compatible with all of the Hero System genres. Other works included Justice Not Law, An Eye for an Eye, Watchers of the Dragon, and articles for Adventurers Club, The HERO System Almanacs, and similar publications. He soon branched out into working for other game companies, such as White Wolf Publishing.

In 1997, Long quit his job as a practicing trial lawyer to write and design games as a freelancer. Gold Rush Games hired Long in 1997 to write a fifth edition of the Hero System, which he finished in July 1999, submitting it to Hero Games instead due to the changing relationship between the two companies at the time. During this time, he wrote for numerous companies, including White Wolf Publishing, Pinnacle Entertainment Group, Steve Jackson Games, Last Unicorn Games, and Chameleon Eclectic. Long joined the developers working for Last Unicorn Games on the "Icon system" for their line of licensed Star Trek role-playing games; to get the Star Trek: The Next Generation RPG ready to debut at GenCon 31, the company few Long out to Los Angeles for two weeks. After the design of Icon was done, Long became the line developer for the Star Trek: Deep Space 9 role-playing game, and by 1999 he was a full-time employee of Last Unicorn Games. In June 2000, Long was one of several employees remaining at Last Unicorn Games when Wizards of the Coast (WOTC) bought the company.

He had worked as a designer for WOTC, working on role-playing games including The Wheel of Time. After leaving WOTC in December 2000, Long was hired by Decipher, Inc. to work on its new Star Trek and Lord of the Rings role-playing games, the latter winning the 2002 Origins Award for Best Role-playing Game. All told, as of late 2001, Long had written, co-authored, edited, or developed over 70 RPG products.

In December 2001, he founded DOJ, Inc. along with Darren Watts and other investors, and purchased the rights and assets of Hero Games from Cybergames, Inc. From 2001 until 2011, Long served as the HERO System Line Developer, during which he wrote and edited over 100 supplements for the Hero System RPG, including the Hero System Fifth Edition in April 2002 and the Hero System Sixth Edition in June 2011. In addition to being an owner of DOJ/Hero, Long's duties as Line Developer include planning, writing, editing, and developing manuscripts for publication. He also runs a section on the HERO Games Forums, where people can post questions in a section where only Steve Long can reply, thus ensuring accurate responses.

Currently, Long is publishing more HERO System material as a licensee under his Elvensong Street Press imprint.

== Personal life ==
Long is a graduate of Duke University and Duke University School of Law. He lives in Greensboro, North Carolina.
