= Champions (role-playing game) =

Tabletop superhero role-playing game

- Designers: Steve Peterson; George MacDonald; Bruce Harlick; Ray Greer
- Publishers: Hero Games
- Publication: 1981 (1st edition); 1982 (2nd edition); 1984 (3rd edition); 1989 (4th edition); 2002 (5th edition); 2010 (6th edition)
- Genres: Superhero fiction
- Languages: English
- Systems: Hero System

Champions is a role-playing game published by Hero Games designed to simulate a superhero comic book world. It was originally created in 1981 by George MacDonald and Steve Peterson in collaboration with Rob Bell, Bruce Harlick and Ray Greer.

The latest 2010 edition uses the sixth edition of the Hero System, as revised by Steve Long, and was written by Aaron Allston.

== Description ==
Champions, first published in 1981, was inspired by Superhero: 2044 and The Fantasy Trip as one of the first published role-playing games in which character generation was based on a point-buy system instead of random dice rolls. A player decides what kind of character to play, and designs the character using a set number of "character points," often abbreviated as "CP." The limited number of character points generally defines how powerful the character will be. Points can be used in many ways: to increase personal characteristics, such as strength or intelligence; to buy special skills, such as martial arts or computer programming; or to build superpowers, such as supersonic flight or telepathy. This point system was praised by reviewers for the balance it gave character generation over random dice rolls. The stats in Champions are Strength, Constitution, Body, Dexterity, Intelligence, Ego, and Presence.

Players are required not only to design a hero's powers, but also the hero's skills, disadvantages, and other traits. Thus, Champions characters are built with friends, enemies, and weaknesses, along with powers and abilities with varying scales of character point value for each. This design approach intends to make all the facets of Champions characters balanced in relation to each other regardless of the specific abilities and character features. Characters are rewarded with more character points after each adventure, which are then used to buy more abilities, or eliminate disadvantages.

== The system ==
Players can design custom superpowers using the Champions rules system. Rather than offering a menu of specific powers, Champions powers are defined by their effects. For instance, an energy blast is the same power regardless of whether it represents a laser beam, ice powers, or magic. The Champions rulebook includes rules governing many different types of generic powers which can then be modified to fit a player's idea.

This allows players to simulate situations found in superhero stories. Like most comic book heroes, characters and villains are frequently knocked out of the fight but seldom killed. There are special rules for throwing heavy objects like aircraft carriers.

== History and other genres ==
The Champions system was adapted to a fantasy genre under the title Fantasy Hero (the first playtest edition of Fantasy Hero appeared before Champions was published), with similar advantages and disadvantages to the original Champions game. In 1984, the rules for Champions began being adapted into generic role-playing game system called the Hero System, although no formal and separate generic release of this as a standalone system would occur until 1990; instead the Champions rules would be edited down, expanded, and otherwise adapted on an individual basis for a variety of different genre treatments, such as pulp and modern espionage. Champions now exists as a genre sourcebook for the Hero System. Books for other genres have also appeared over the years, including Star Hero, Dark Champions, Pulp Hero, and Ninja Hero.

== Character archetypes and designs ==
=== Archetypes ===
While Champions does not use "character classes" as some RPGs do, it defines common superhero archetypes as found in comic books. These are based variably on how they use their powers in combat, motivation, or the powers' origin. As listed in the Champions genre book, they are:

- Brick – slower hand-to-hand fighter who relies more on raw strength and tougher defenses (Hulk / Colossus)
- Energy Projector – primary combat ability is a ranged attack, which, despite the name, is not necessarily energy-based (Cyclops / Starfire)
- Gadgeteer – abilities based on technological devices (Brainiac 5 / Forge)
- Martial Artist (or martist for short) – lightly armored hand-to-hand combatant who fights with skill, quickness, and agility (Daredevil / Wolverine / Batman)
- Mentalist – abilities target the mind, not the physical foe (Professor X / Jean Grey)
- Metamorph – abilities involving changes in shape and/or size (Plastic Man / Mystique)
- Mystic – trained in the use of magic, or with abilities or items with magical properties (Doctor Fate / Doctor Strange)
- Patriot – an embodiment of his or her nation (Captain America / Captain Britain)
- Powered Armor – a variant of a Gadgeteer, who uses an "all-in-one" gadget worn as armor (Iron Man / Cyborg)
- Sink – with primary abilities being drains or transfers, a "Sink" can diminish, nullify or steal another characters powers, abilities or stats, either temporarily or permanently. (Rogue / Parasite)
- Speedster – with abilities based around movement (The Flash / Quicksilver)
- Weaponmaster – with expertise at using a particular type of weapon (Green Arrow / Swordsman)

It is possible for a character to fall into multiple categories, such as Superman (brick/energy projector/speedster/patriot), Batman (martial artist/gadgeteer), or Spider-Man (martial artist/speedster/gadgeteer). It is also common for characters not to fall into any easily defined category—these categories are simply to provide easy definition and have no impact on gameplay.

=== The Champions Team ===
The Champions superhero team is presented as an example of how to build a well-balanced team in terms of game mechanics, including the hero Flare. Their enemies include Foxbat and Doctor Destroyer.

4th edition

- Defender – inventor wearing powered armor
- Jaguar – werecat
- Obsidian – alien prince brick
- Quantum – mutant energy projector
- Seeker – martial artist
- Solitaire – mystic

5th edition

- Defender – an inventor wearing powered armor
- Ironclad – super-strong and super-tough alien
- Nighthawk – grim inventor/martial artist
- Sapphire – flying energy projector
- Witchcraft – sorceress

6th edition

- Defender – inventor wearing powered armor
- Ironclad – super-strong and super-tough alien
- Kinetik – speedster
- Sapphire – flying energy projector
- Witchcraft – sorceress

=== Setting ===
Much of the game is set in Millennium City. After its destruction by Dr. Destroyer, Detroit was rebuilt and renamed.

== MMORPG ==
A massively multiplayer online role-playing game based on the license was announced by Cryptic Studios, who had developed the popular City of Heroes and then reinvented Marvel Universe Online to Marvel Heroes. The game was released in September 2009. The game takes place in the established Champions universe and features classic Champions heroes and villains as NPCs.

== Flextiles game supplement ==
Flextiles supplement published by Hero Games

Flextiles is a 1983 role-playing supplement for Champions. It is published by Hero. Craig Sheeley for Space Gamer commented in a review that "...the Flextile concept is a good idea, but not at the price Flextiles sell for now. Cut the cost [...] and they'd be much better."

== Reception ==
Steve Perrin reviewed Champions for Different Worlds magazine and stated that "All in all, an excellent effort. If donning your colorful costume and flying out the window to fight crime in your never-ending battle for truth, justice, and the American Way is for you, buy this game."

In the January 1982 edition of Ares, Eric Goldberg noted the "sketchy" design of the first edition, and yet believed that "in many ways, it is sufficient... What enables the designers to get away with this minimalist approach is an unswerving devotion to the philosophy and to the spirit of the superhero comic, which itself has never pretended to be terribly complex."

In the April–May 1982 edition of White Dwarf, Dave Morris liked the first edition combat system, calling it "a good simulation of comic-book battles". But Morris questioned whether players would enjoy playing superheroes rather than more ordinary characters found in most other role-playing games. He gave the game an average rating of 7 out of 10, saying, "All the same, the occasional bout of world-saving might be enjoyable, and Champions is worth buying on this basis alone."

Reviews for two editions of the game appeared in Dragon:

- In the January 1982 edition, Scott Bennie liked the well-written and concise text of the first edition, but noticed many gaps and holes in the rules, including a lack of any system for buying equipment. Nevertheless, Bennie gave the game a thumbs up, saying, "Despite these flaws, I heartily recommend Champions. The more serious gamer will undoubtedly be put off by the silliness, and not everyone has a comic-book mind. But if you like this sort of thing, Champions is for you!"
- In the October 1990 edition, Allen Varney disliked the slow pace of the 4th edition combat system. But he concluded with a strong recommendation, saying, "Fans of previous editions will delight in the new consistency and versatility. Experienced players of other games, discontent with the arbitrary restrictions of their current system, should also find the HERO SYSTEM rules a superb investment. Lastly, for comic-book fans who want to simulate every maneuver they see in their favorite stories, the Champions game remains, after almost 10 years, the system to beat."

Reviews for various editions of the game appeared in The Space Gamer:

- In the September 1981 edition, Aaron Allston recommended the first edition of the game for those interested in the superhero theme, saying "If the subject matter interests you, I'd wholeheartedly recommend this product."
- In the September–October 1983 edition, Russell Grant Collins wasn't sure if readers should buy the second edition: "Should you buy this material? I think so, if you are interested in superhero RPGs. If you hated the original Champions rules for more than their slight omissions and loopholes, don't bother. The changes aren't all that significant. If you're happy with the old version, weigh your decision carefully."
- In the March–April 1985 edition, Allen Varney recommended the third edition for everyone, saying, "Champions is the only superhero RPG I would recommend; and this edition of Champions is the one to buy."
- In the October–November 1989 edition, Dave Rogers reviewed the fourth edition of Champions and recommended it, saying, "even if you have all the Hero Games products ever printed, it still has something new to offer. Now, it's the only role-playing game you'll ever need."

In Issue 20 of Abyss (August 1982), Lew Bryson reviewed the 2nd edition and noted "The main point of the game is me! The character! The rules put a constant emphasis on role-playing and character conception. It's thought provoking." Bryson concluded, "With intelligence, innovation and an open mind, Champions can provide a great 'other side' to [fantasy role-playing]." In Issue 33, Bryson reviewed the 3rd edition and reiterated his objections: "Only one attack per round, too many damn dice to roll, and off-the-shelf weapons have to be bought with power points." However, Bryson concluded, "It is still my preferred system."

In Issue 83 of Computer and Video Games, Wayne B. Gamer found the character generation system "easy", but noted the combat system "is where the game totters slightly as it is quite involved and time consuming. On the positive side it is quite realistic and covers all possible outcomes." Gamer rated the game 8 out of 10, saying, "To quote the designers of the game: 'The main object of the game is for the players and GM to have fun.' I totally agree, and so those more serious-minded roleplayers should give this game a wide berth."

Ken Cliffe reviewed the 4th edition of Champions for White Wolf, rating it 3 out of 5 overall, and stated that "I recommend this book to anyone already familiar with the hero system, and suggest the Champions game to anyone who enjoys exact, complicated role-playing. To those looking for slick, fun role-playing, I say look to other SHRPGs and other game systems."

In February 1989's issue of The Games Machine, John Woods reviewed the 4th edition of the game and called the rules "a model of clarity", although he criticized the lack of an index. He concluded with a strong recommendation, saying, "One of the best aspects of this type of game is that you don’t need anything more than the rulebook and a little imagination to start playing a fast moving game where the future of the world lies in your hands!"

In his 1990 book The Complete Guide to Role-Playing Games, game critic Rick Swan commented, "In addition to being one of the oldest superhero RPGs, Champions is easily the biggest and arguably the best." Swan noted that the character generation system "gives players near-total freedom in assembling the superhero of their dreams." However, he found that the combat system "is the game's weakest features, a seemingly endless array of numbers, formulas and tables that's all but certain to discourage first-timers." Swan concluded by giving the game an excellent rating of 3.5 out of 4, saying, "Of all the superhero RPGs, Champions remains the connoisseur's choice."

In a 1996 reader poll taken by Arcane magazine to determine the 50 most popular roleplaying games of all time, Champions was ranked 27th. Editor Paul Pettengale commented: "It wasn't the first superhero RPG and it never had licensed links to any big-name comics – but it's still the classic of the genre. It popularised the now-commonplace 'points-design' approach to character creation; in fact, it's probably the most flexible, detailed points-based system ever, which makes it rather overwhelming for some new players, and combat can be a little slow. But once you've learned how to use it, no other game catches the feeling of superhero action in quite the same way."

Steve Marsh reviewed the 5th edition of the game in Pyramid and wrote, "For what it sets out to do, Champions is an astounding book. It is remarkably useful for players and GMs, newbies and experienced hands alike. It covers all the basics needed to run a campaign, but it does more than that." Marsh admitted there were a few minor problems, including the lack of "totally new Powers, Skills, or Disadvantages. Likewise it is possible that Hero System fans may find the selection of super-gadgetry, devices, and bases to be somewhat limited." Despite this, Marsh concluded on a positive note, writing, "Although chock full of utility for Hero System players wanting to run a super-powered game, it should serve a place of honor for any super-heroic fan. It is perhaps the definitive genre book, and fans who have waited a decade for the new edition anticipated how good it was likely to be. They were correct. And if you didn't own this book before because you didn't know about it, now you do."

Champions was included in the 2007 book Hobby Games: The 100 Best. Game designer Bill Bridges described Champions as "the superhero roleplaying game. While it wasn't the first game on the market that let you play superheroes and duke it out with supervillains, using earth-shattering powers, it was the most innovative. The major roleplaying games of the time involved characters stalking monsters in dungeons; the heroes in Champions delivered knockout blows to archnemeses—all while speaking the requisite inspiring soliloquies."

In his 2023 book Monsters, Aliens, and Holes in the Ground, RPG historian Stu Horvath noted that Champions was a pioneer in two respects. It "is the first entirely new game to embrace the idea of non-random character generation through a point-buy system, and it marks a significant expansion of the concept." The second new concept was "the idea of disadvantages."

== Other reviews and commentary ==
- InQuest No. 27, July 1997 (for 5th edition)
- Comics Feature #36

== Awards ==
- At the 1999 Origins Awards, Champions was inducted into the Adventure Gaming Hall of Fame
- Three Champions adventures won ENnie Awards:
  - In 2004, in the "Best Non-D20 Adventure" category, Champions Battlegrounds won a gold medal, and Shades of Black won a Silver Medal
  - In 2005, Villainy Amok won a silver medal for "Best Adventure"

== In other media ==
=== Comics ===
Starting in June 1986, a comic book limited series was published by Eclipse Comics based on characters from the first Champions campaign. The Eclipse series included character sheets that allowed readers to incorporate characters used in the comic books into their own Champions campaigns; this practice was also used in the Villains and Vigilantes comic book limited series (also published by Eclipse in 1986–1987).

Soon after Eclipse's initial limited series, an ongoing Champions series was published by Hero Comics (later Hero Graphics, later still Heroic Publishing) from 1987 to 1993.

As of 2024, Heroic Publishing was still publishing comics about some of the Champions characters (under the title League of Champions), although the publisher had long since parted ways with the makers of the game.
