= Hero Games =

Game publisher

- Industry: Role-playing game publisher
- Founded: 1981
- Headquarters: United States
- Products: Champions

Hero Games (DOJ, Inc. dba "Hero Games") is the publisher of the Hero System, a generic roleplaying rules set that can be used to simulate many different genres, and was the co-developer of the Fuzion system.

== History ==
In 1981, George MacDonald and Steve Peterson, from San Mateo, California, printed 1,000 copies of a 64-page rulebook for Champions, their super-hero role-playing game, to take to a Bay Area gaming convention. It sold very strongly, enough to form a company, Hero Games. Later, the pair recruited Ray Greer as their sales and marketing partner.

In the following years, the company published two more editions of Champions, two dozen adventures, and several self-contained role-playing games using the Champions core rules as a universal role-playing system: Danger International, Justice, Inc., Robot Warriors, Fantasy Hero, and Star Hero. The games were very compatible, but each differed slightly, using new rules or costs. Hero Games used the term Hero System to describe them all.

Ongoing production and financial troubles plagued the company, however, and in January 1986, Hero Games made an arrangement with Iron Crown Enterprises, publishers of Rolemaster and MERP. Initially, this was only to handle the game production and distribution, leaving creative tasks to Hero Games, but in 1987 ICE also took over editorial. During this period the company was led by Rob Bell, followed by Monte Cook, and finally by Bruce Harlick.

The original partners found new interests: Greer worked for Steve Jackson Games, and later he joined a Los Angeles movie special effects company run by Mark Williams, Hero Games's original artist. MacDonald became Senior Game Developer at the software company Strategic Simulations, Inc. Peterson went to work for Electronic Arts, and then became a freelance marketing consultant and technical writer, but remained most connected with Hero Games of the original three.

On April 25, 1996, ICE's role in handling publishing and distribution was taken over by R. Talsorian Games, just before Iron Crown itself suffered financial difficulties in 1997. During this period, Bruce Harlick, who had been the first official hire of Hero Games in 1982, continued in his role as Line Developer. This collaboration also resulted in the Fuzion system, which was successful in itself, but an attempt to publish the Champions game under the new system as Champions: The New Millennium met mixed reviews.

In 2000, Hero Games was bought by Cybergames.com, a gaming portal site which Steve Peterson was working for. Cybergames.com retained Bruce Harlick as president of their Hero Games subsidiary, but eventually decided to leave the publishing market in 2001. In December 2001, a new company called DOJ, Inc. acquired all rights to Hero Games, keeping none of the remaining original staff. DOJ, Inc., consisted of Steven S. Long (line developer), Darren Watts (president), and various support staff. It was formed specifically to acquire Hero Games. The title came from "Defenders of Justice", Watts's Champions campaign.

In 2011 Darren Watts left DOJ, Inc., to pursue other ventures, and warehouse manager Jason S. Walters assumed the role of CEO, acting in consultation with Steve Long and its other investors. The company now focuses on promoting stand-alone products that utilize various versions of the 6th Edition Hero System rules.

== Current Publications ==
=== Role-playing games ===
Besides the Hero System itself, Hero Games is also the publisher of genre books which supplement the generic system: Champions, a role-playing game where players can create and play superheroes; Fantasy Hero, where characters operate in a fantasy setting; Star Hero, which uses science fiction settings; Dark Champions, which simulates various forms of the action-adventure genre; and many other games. Champions, originally published as a stand-alone game in 1981, was the catalyst for the creation of the Hero System.

All of the above games, as well as nearly all games published by the company, use the Hero System as their basis. While early editions included the system rules with each genre book, this ended with the Fourth Edition of Champions. Currently, the Sixth Edition of the rules is a pair of books, and the "genre books" show how to use the system to reflect the conventions of superheroic, fantasy, science fiction, and other adventure genres.

Former exceptions to the "Hero System only" rule are Champions: The New Millennium and its supplements, published in the late 1990s using the Fuzion system.

Recent Hero Games publications include Champions Complete, a stand-alone, moderately priced book for playing Champions, and the Monster Hunter International Employee Handbook, a stand-alone roleplaying game detailing the world of Larry Correia's Monster Hunter International.

=== Expansion books ===
Hero Games also published a series of "ultimate" expansion books for the Fifth Edition, which provided an additional level of detail on specific types of characters or accessories, over what was explained in more general terms in the main Hero System rules or genre books. Examples of this line included The Ultimate Martial Artist and The Ultimate Vehicle. Only one such title has been released for the Sixth Edition, The Ultimate Base, although some older titles are being revised into Hero System Core Library titles such as Hero System Martial Arts and Hero System Vehicles.

=== Game settings ===
Finally, the company publishes a number of game settings for its most popular genres, along with supplements to flesh those settings out. The "main" (that is, most strongly supported) setting for Champions is Millennium City; for Fantasy Hero, The Turakian Age; for Star Hero, the Terran Empire; and for Dark Champions, Hudson City. Other settings are also available for those who prefer a different "feel" than these provide. All fit into a single, universal timeline, known as the Hero Universe.

All of the above are supported, to varying extents, by the Digital Hero online magazine.

=== Hero Comics and Hero Graphics ===
Many characters seen in the early Champions rulebooks later appeared in comic books from Hero Comics (later, Hero Graphics), and kicked off with a limited series by Eclipse Comics. Few of these characters are still used by the company (now known as Heroic Publishing), although Icestar is mentioned as a casualty from "The Battle of Detroit" in Champions Universe. Like the Villains and Vigilantes comic book limited series, the early issues printed write-up sheets allowing readers to use characters introduced in the comics in their own Champions campaigns. Strangely, this is even true for characters included in the core rules, such as Icicle, Pulsar, and Mechanon.

=== Digital Hero online magazine ===
Digital Hero was the official online magazine for Hero Games, supporting its Hero System games including Champions, Fantasy Hero, Star Hero, Dark Champions, and others. It was published bimonthly in downloadable PDF format, each issue being a fixed 64 pages long not including the cover (and a blank "fluff" page serving as an inside front cover to facilitate double-sided printing). The final issue, number 47, was published in January 2008, although the company did indicate the possibility of a return in the future.

== See also ==
- Steve Long (Hero Games) - Line developer and co-owner
