= Kraken =

Mythical sea monster

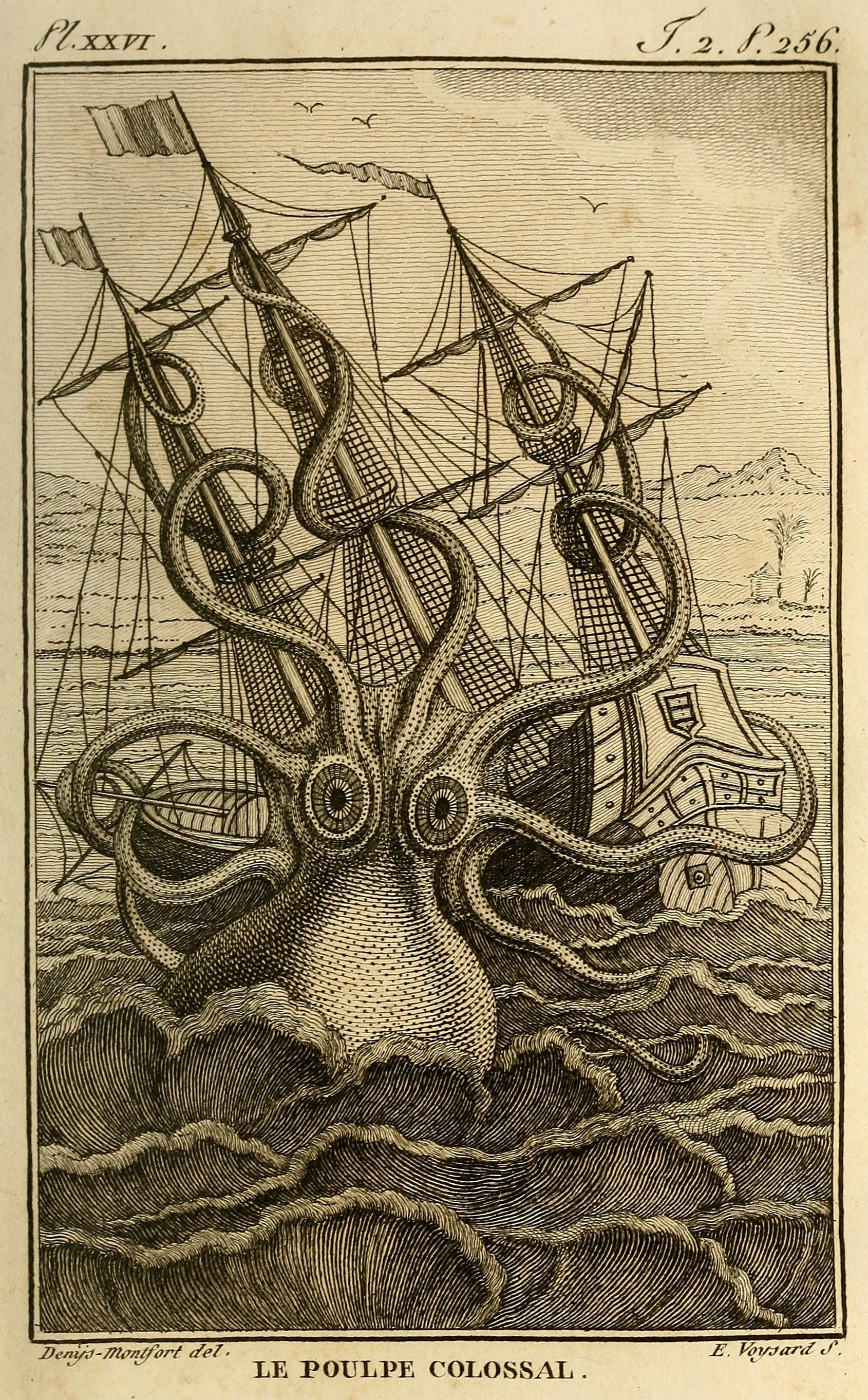
A "colossal octopus" attacking ship, pen and wash by Pierre Denys de Montfort, engraved by Étienne Claude Voysard, 1801

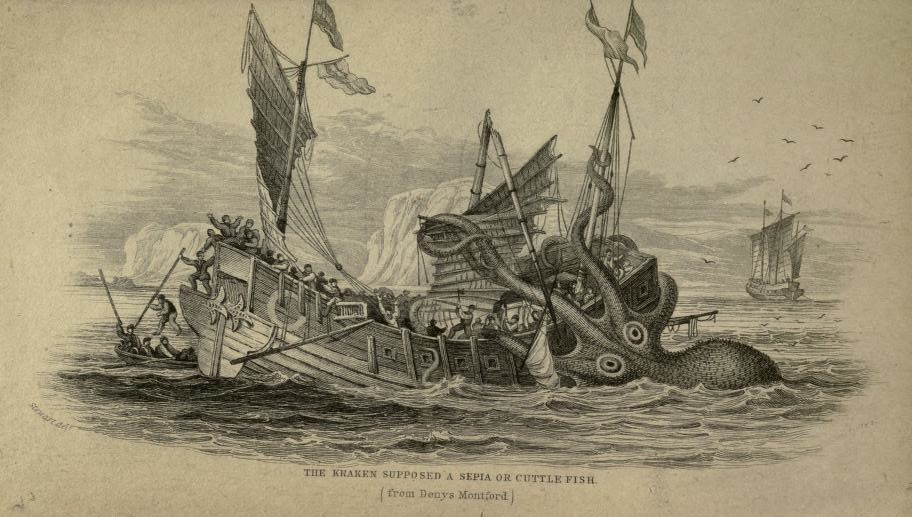
Kraken, an unconfirmed cephalopod. (Note: Caption: "The kraken, supposed a sepia or cuttlefish from Denys Montford" [sic.]". Sepia was formerly the genus that octopuses, squid, and cuttlefish (cephalopods) were all assigned to. Thus "eight-armed cuttle-fish" became the standardized name for "octopus".) Engraving by W. H. Lizars, in Hamilton, Robert (1839). Naturalist's Library. Adapted "from Denys Montford" [sic.]

The kraken (/ˈkræ.kən/; from Norwegian: kraken, /ˈkrɑː.kən/) is a legendary sea monster of enormous size, per its etymology something akin to a cephalopod, said to appear in the Norwegian Sea off the coast of Norway. It is believed that the legend of the Kraken may have originated from sightings of giant squid, which may grow to 10.5 metres (34 ft) in length.

The kraken, as a subject of sailors' superstitions and mythos, was first described in a Norwegian glossary by Christen Jensøn in 1646. Later this creature appears in a travelogue by Francesco Negri in 1700, followed in 1734 by an account from Dano-Norwegian missionary and explorer Hans Egede, who described the kraken in detail and equated it with the hafgufa of medieval lore. However, the first description of the creature is usually credited to the Danish bishop Pontoppidan (1753). He described the kraken as an octopus (polypus) of tremendous size, (Note: He vacillated between polypus and "star fish" however.) and wrote that it had a reputation for pulling down ships. The French malacologist Denys-Montfort, of the 19th century, is also known for his pioneering inquiries into the existence of gigantic octopuses.

The great man-hunting octopus entered French fiction when Victor Hugo introduced the pieuvre octopus of Guernsey lore in his 1866 novel Toilers of the Sea, which he identified with the kraken of legend. This led to Jules Verne's depiction of the kraken in his novel Twenty Thousand Leagues Under the Seas, although Verne did not distinguish between octopuses and squids.

Carl Linnaeus may have indirectly written about the kraken. Linnaeus wrote about the Microcosmus genus (an animal with various other organisms or growths attached to it, comprising a colony). Subsequent authors have referred to Linnaeus's writing, and the writings of Thomas Bartholin's cetus called hafgufa, and Christian Franz Paullini's monstrum marinum as "krakens". (Note: Denys-Montfort's footnote identified his kraken with Paullini's monstrum marinum also, leading Samuel Latham Mitchill to comment that "Linnaeus considered the Kraken as a real existence", publishing it under Microcosmus.) That said, the claim that Linnaeus used the word "kraken" in the margin of a later edition of Systema Naturae has not been confirmed.

== Etymology ==
The word "kraken" in English (in the sense of the sea monster) derives from Norwegian: kraken or krakjen of the same sense, which are the definite forms of krake (kraken = "the krake").

According to a Norwegian dictionary, the root meaning of krake is "malformed or overgrown, crooked tree". It originates from Old Norse kraki, which is etymologically related to Old Norse krókr, lit. 'hook', cognate with "crook". This is backed up by the Swedish dictionary SAOB, published by the Swedish Academy, which gives essentially the exact same description for the word in Swedish and confirming the lead krak as a diminutive form of krok, Norwegian and Swedish for 'hook/crook'; krake thus roughly translate to "crookie". With time, "krake" has come to mean any severed tree stem or trunk with crooked outgrowths, in turn giving name to objects and tools based on such, notably for the subject matter, primitive anchors and drags (grapnel anchors) made from severed spruce tops or branchy bush trunks outfitted with a stone sinker, known as krake, but also krabbe in Norwegian or krabba in Swedish (lit. 'crab'). (Note: Norwegian: Krabbe, Swedish: krabba (lit. 'crab') as a word for drag (grapnel anchor) is assumed to be figuratively derived from the animal of the same name, as both shares the nature of crawling on the sea bed. The word stems from Old Norse: krabbi, etymologically root cognate with Middle Low German: krabbe, Old English: crabba, 'to crawl'.) Old Norse kraki mostly corresponds to these uses in modern Icelandic, meaning, among other things, "twig" and "drag", but also "pile barrage-pole" and "boat hook". Swedish SAOB gives the translations of Icelandic kraki as "thin rod with hook on it", "wooden drag with stone sinker" and "dry spruce trunk with the crooked, stripped branches still attached".

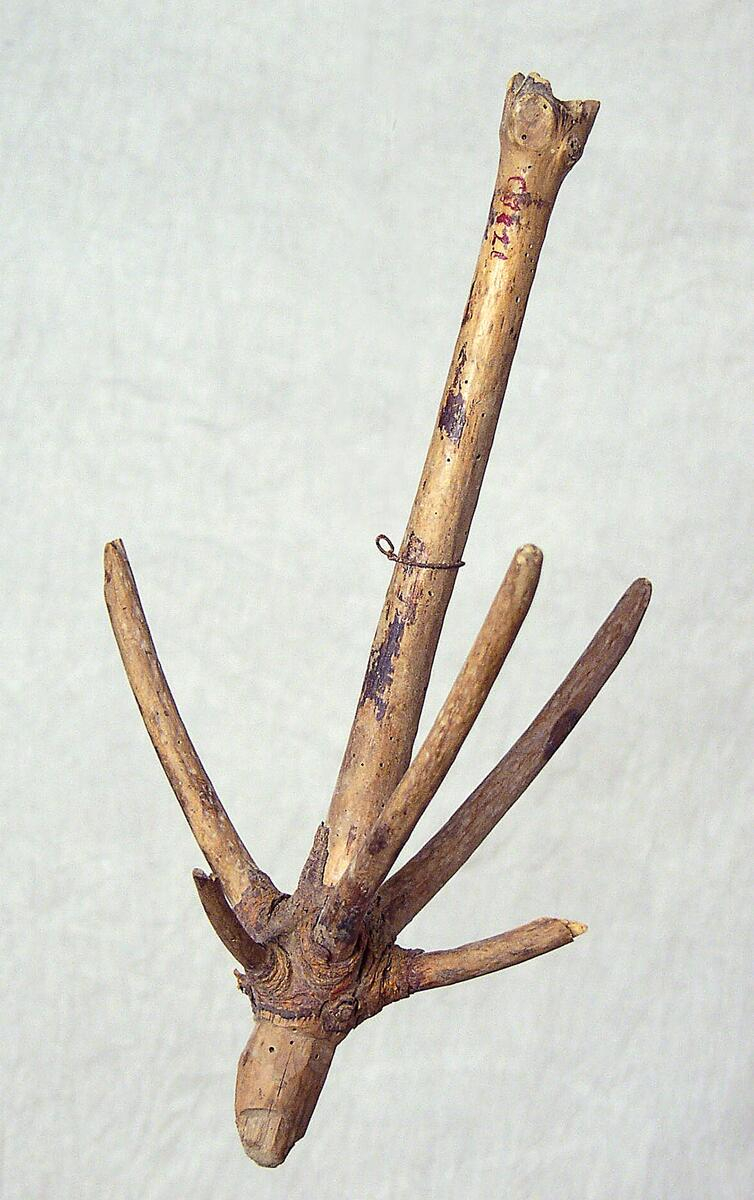
Old style Scandinavian drag (grapnel anchor) made from the top of a tree, historically known as krake or krabbe in the Scandinavian languages, probably the root for the naming of the mythological monster.

Kraken is assumed to have been named figuratively after the meaning "crooked tree" or its derivate meaning "drag", as trunks with crooked branches or outgrowths, and especially drags, wooden or not, readily conjure up the image of a cephalopod or similar. This idea seems to first have been notably remarked by Icelandic philologist Finnur Jónsson in 1920. A synonym for kraken has also been krabbe (see below), which further indicates a name-theme referencing drags.

=== Synonyms ===
Besides kraken, the monster went under a variety of names early on, the most common after kraken being horven ("the horv"). Icelandic philologist Finnur Jónsson explained this name in 1920 as an alternative form of harv (lit. 'harrow') and conjectured that this name was suggested by the inkfish's action of seeming to plough the sea.

Some of the synonyms of krake given by Erik Pontoppidan were, in Danish: (Note: Pontoppidan of course wrote in Danish, the standard literary language for Norwegians at the time, though words like krake were presumably taken down from the mouths of the native Norwegian populace.)

- horv (horven) – harrow
- søe-horv (søe-horven) – sea-harrow
- søe-krake (søe-kraken) – sea-kraken
- kraxe (kraxen) – alternate spelling of "krakse" (Note: With definite article suffixed forms such as Kraxen or Krabben appearing in the English translation.)
- krabbe (krabben) – named after the drag (grapnel anchor) "crab" (see above)
- anker-trold – anchor-troll (Note: Pontopoppidan's "Soe-draulen, Soe-trolden, Sea-mischief" has been frequently requoted, but these terms can be deferred to Egede's explanation (discussed further, below) that employs søe-trold as a general classification, under which krake and the søe-drau fall. The word drau as a variant of draug was recognized by Pontoppidan as meaning 'spøgelse ghost, spectre', and the latter form draug is defined more specifically as a being associated with sea or water in modern Norwegian dictionaries. The "Sea-mischief" appears in the English translation but is absent in the original.)

=== Related words ===
Since the 19th century, the word krake has, beyond the monster, given name to the cephalopod order Octopoda in Swedish (krakar) (Note: Although "eight-armed cephalopods", Swedish: åttaarmade bläckfiskar, is a more common synonym.) and German (Kraken), resulting in many species of octopuses partly named such, such as the common octopus (Octopus vulgaris), which is named jättekrake ("giant kraken") in Swedish and Gewöhnlicher Krake ("common kraken") in German. The family Octopodidae is also known as Echte Kraken ("true krakens") in German. In Icelandic, octopoda is instead named kolkrabbar ("coal crabs") after the crab nickname, the common octopus simply named kolkrabbi.

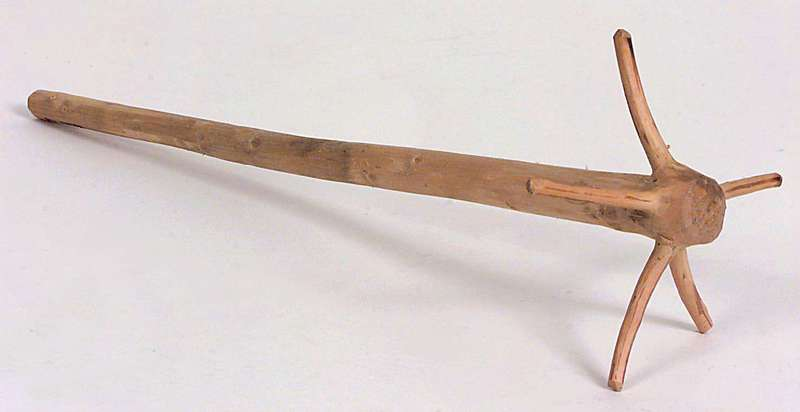
Wooden whisk, known in Swedish as kräkla, and krekle in dialectal Norwegian

The Swedish diminutive form kräkel, a word for a branchy/spiny piece of wood, have given name to a variety of sea dwelling plants in Swedish, most notably furcellaria lumbricalis, a species of red algae. (Note: Kräkel has also been used to describe Potamogeton Vaill (pondweed) and Zostera Lin (marine eelgrass), etc.) There is also the morphological derivation kräkla (dialectal Norwegian: krekle), meaning crooked piece of wood, which has given name to primitive forms of whisks and beaters (cooking), made from the tops of trees by keeping a row of twigs as the beating element, resembling the appearance of a cephalopod, but also crosiers and shepherd's crooks.

Shetlandic krekin for "whale", a taboo word, is listed as etymologically related.

== General description ==
The kraken was described as a many-headed and clawed creature by Hans Egede (1741)[1729], who stated it was equivalent to the Icelanders' hafgufa, but the latter is commonly treated as a fabulous whale (the name meaning "sea reeker", compare a whale blowing water). Erik Pontoppidan (1753), who popularized the kraken to the world, noted that it was multiple-armed according to lore, and conjectured it to be a giant sea-crab, starfish or a polypus (octopus). Still, Pontoppidan is considered to have been instrumental in sparking interest for the kraken in the English-speaking world, as well as becoming regarded as the authority on sea-serpents and krakens.

Denys-Montfort (1801) published on two giants, the "colossal octopus" with the enduring image of it attacking a ship, and the "kraken octopod", deemed to be the largest organism in zoology. Denys-Montfort matched his "colossal" with Pliny's tale of the giant polypus that attacked ships-wrecked people, while making correspondence between his kraken and Pliny's monster called the arbor marina. (Note: And other fabulous-seeming creatures, such as monstrum marinum, bellua marina omnium vastissima, etc.) Finnur Jónsson (1920) also favored identifying the kraken as an inkfish (squid/octopus) on etymological grounds.

=== Nordisk familjebok (1884) ===
Contemporary art, by Norwegian artist Kim Diaz Holm, interpreting kraken according to the 18th century descriptions.

The Swedish encyclopedia Nordisk familjebok gave the following summation of the Kraken myth in 1884:

Kraken ("the crookie") or horven ("the harrow"), a sea monster belonging to the realm of fable, of which E. Pontoppidan, with the support of the statements of Norwegian fishermen, recorded in “Norges natuurlijke historie” (1752–53).

It is said that when fishermen row out a few miles (Scandinavian miles) from the coast on a hot summer's day in a calm, and according to normal calculations should find a depth of 80–100 fathoms (140–180 metres (460–590 ft) deep), it sometimes happens that the plummet bottoms at 20–30 fathoms (35–50 metres (115–164 ft) deep). But in this water stand the most abundant shoals of cod and lings. Then you can assume that the kraken lurks down there; as it is he who forms the artificial elevation of the bottom and by his secretions attracts fish there. But if those fishing notice that the kraken is rising, it is necessary to row away for all the boat can take. After a few minutes, the beast can then be seen lifting the upper part of its body above the surface of the water, which for a quarter of a mile (ca 1.5 mi.) in circumference appears as a collection of skerries, covered with swaying, seaweed-like growths. Finally, a few shining tentacles rise up in the air, increasingly thicker at the bottom, which can even appear as high as ship's masts. After a while, the kraken gives in to sinking again, and you then have to be careful not to run into the suction vortex that is formed.

== Historical descriptions ==
=== Olaus Magnus (1539–1555) ===
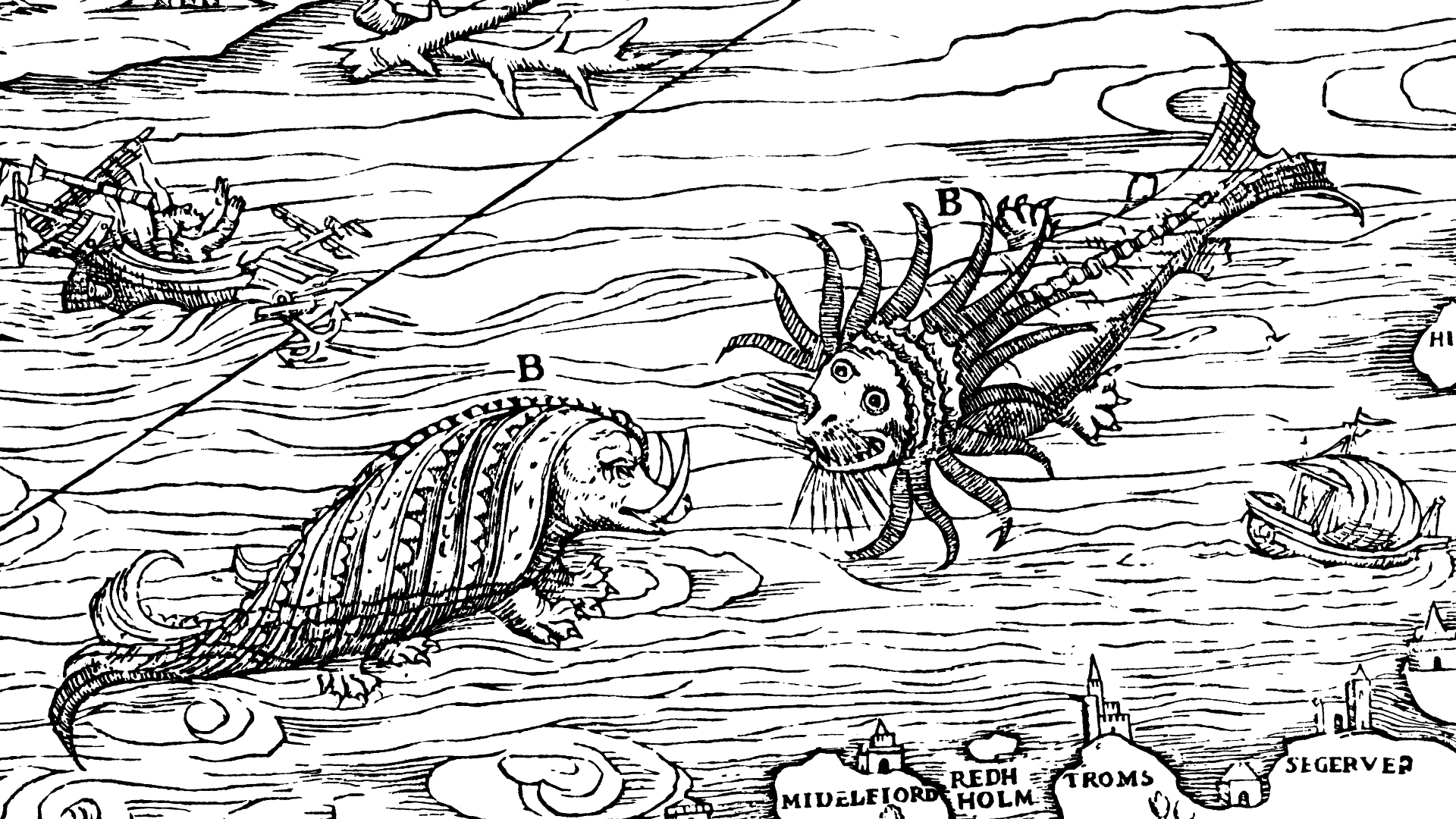
Two monsters, the ferocious toothed "swine whale", and the horned, flashy-eyed "bearded whale" on Olaus' map, given specific names by Gessner (1516–1565). The "bearded" is possibly a kraken. (Note: Nigg, under "Kraken". Nigg references the beasts labeled "D" in Sebastian Münster's "Monstra Marina" and confusingly states that Münster's key "D" "repeats Olaus' key", but by visual comparison it is unmistakable that the two beasts in question are the two beasts labeled "B" in Olaus' map (shown in the figure above/right).) Olaus Magnus, Carta marina (1539)

One of the earliest possible descriptions of the kraken, based on its iconography, is found on Swedish writer Olaus Magnus' famous map of Scandinavia from 1539, the Carta marina, featuring various illustrated sea-monsters. Magnus did not use the term kraken, but did feature a sea monster, in the Norwegian Sea between Norway and Iceland, in the shape of a fish with tentacles growing out of its head, next to another sea monster in the shape of a fish with tusks.

The Carta marina describes the two monsters as follows:

B monstra duo marina maxima vnum dentibus truculentum, alterum cornibus et visu flammeo horrendum / Cuius oculi circumferentia XVI vel XX pedum mensuram continet

Translation:

B two enormous sea monsters, one with ferocious teeth, the other with horns and a horrendous flaming gaze / The circumference of whose eye measures 16 or 20 feet

What measurement Magnus referenced is unknown. It could be period Swedish feet: 296.9 mm (11.69 in), Norwegian (Danish) feet: 313.8 mm (12.35 in), or something else. At the time of the map's creation, Magnus had been living in exile in Danzig, Poland, since 1527, moving to Venice in 1539 before the map's publication. Applying a generic foot-value of 300 mm (12 in), the eye-diameter given would be something akin to 1.5–1.9 m (4.9–6.2 ft).

Swiss naturalist Conrad Gesner (1516–1565) named the tusked creature "swine whale" (German: Schweinwal), and the horned creature "bearded whale" (German: Bart-wal).

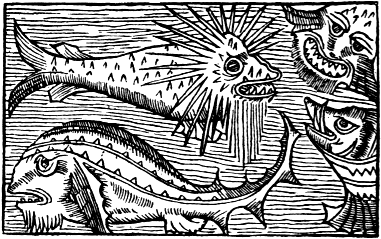
The horned, flashy-eyed "bearded whale" and toothed "swine whale" (right corner) in Olaus' book (1555)

Later on, in 1555, Magnus released a work expanding on the map, titled Historia de Gentibus Septentrionalibus (English title: A Description of the Northern Peoples), a massive work describing Scandinavian customs, folklore and nature. In book 21, chapter 5, titled De horrilibus Monstris littorum Norvegiæ (The Horrible Monsters off the Coasts of Norway), he describes the Carta marina creature in detail, saying its part of a group of nameless monster fishes outside the Norwegian coast, which by extension are grouped with whales. The following description appears to intermix traits from both whales and squids; for one, he says it is black in color, with a square head the length of 10–12 cubits (roughly 6–7 m (20–23 ft), if assumed to be Swedish ells: 0.594 m (1.95 ft)), with a body length of 14–15 cubits (roughly 8–9 m (26–30 ft)), giving a total length of 14–16 m (46–52 ft), which is consistent with sperm whales; but also, spiny and sharp, which could stem from whale barnacles; however, around the head, it is equipped with long rootlike horns akin to the base of an uprooted tree, and its eyes are big, with a circumference of 8–10 cubits (roughly 1.5–1.9 m (4.9–6.2 ft) in diameter, the same as on Carta marina), the pupils being one cubit (≈ 0.6 m (2.0 ft)) in width and flaming red, which is more consistent with squids than any whale. In the dark, fishermen can see the flaming eyes from far away, indicating that these descriptions stem from the evening hours. The "flaming eyes" could stem from bioluminescent photophores, which are found on various squids, such as the Taningia danae, which has two very large photophores on the end of two of its arms, the largest known in the natural world, but also the colossal squid, which actually has light organs in the eyes. Lastly, it has a beard, the hairs thick as goose feathers. Such could be stalked whale barnacles, like Xenobalanus globicipitis, which usually hangs from fins or the lower jaw of whales.

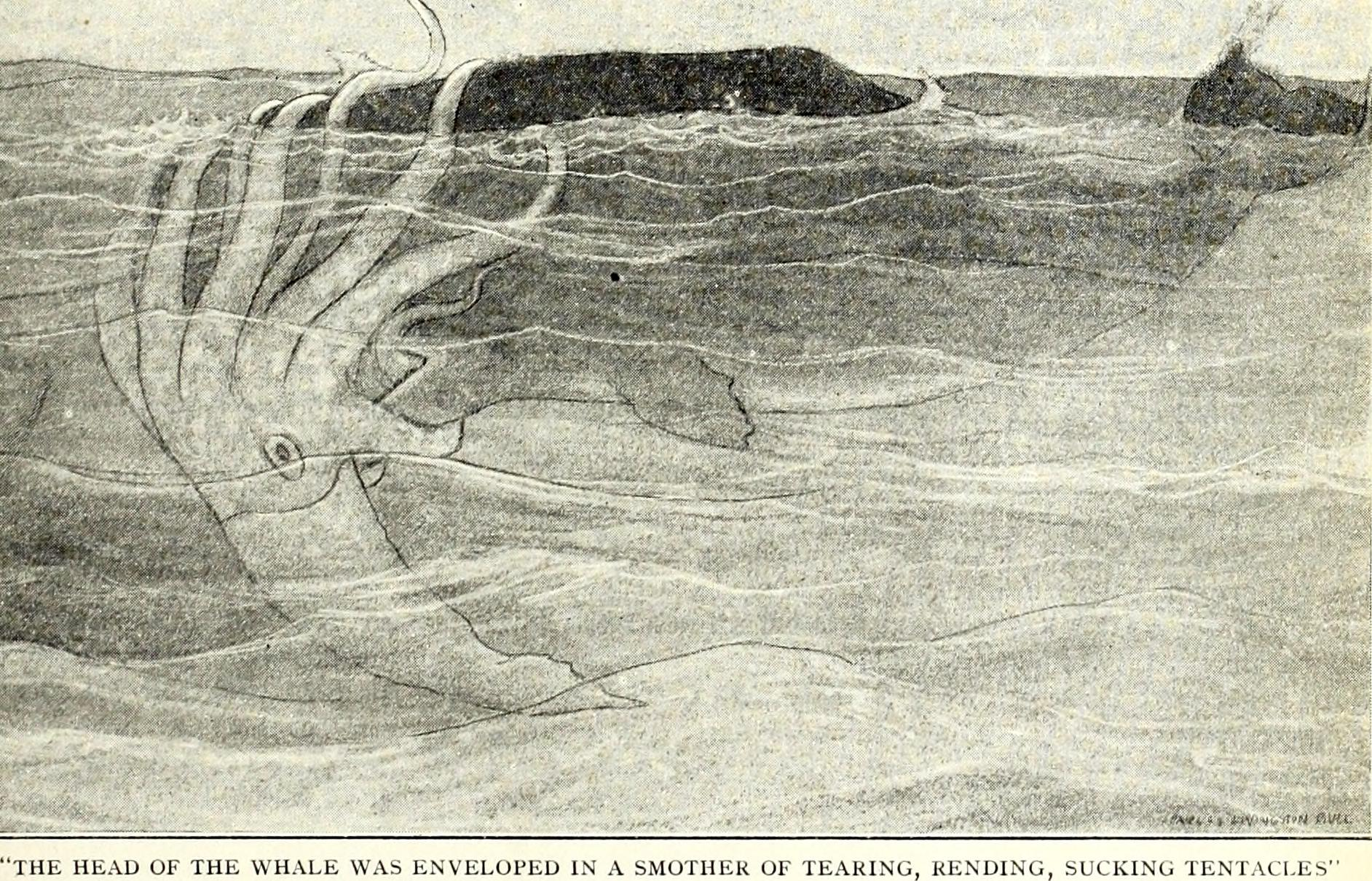
19th century depiction of a squid clinging to the head of a sperm whale

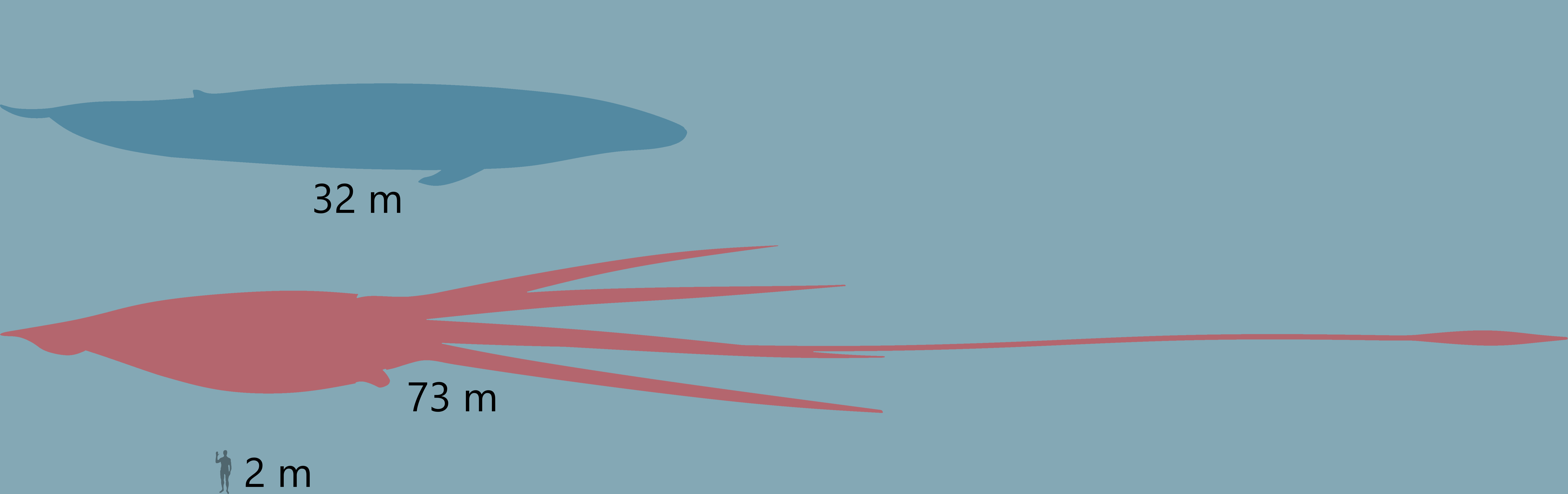
Image depicting the thought experiment of upscaling a giant squid to the eye-dimensions given by Olaus Magnus, here 73 meters long, shown next to a 32 meter long blue whale and a near 2 meter tall human.

Considering that sperm whales regularly hunt giant squids, and that these testimonies appear to be derived from evening hours, it seems reasonable to think they derive from sperm whales hunting giant squids to the surface. In turn, if these eye dimensions are compared to a modern day giant squid, where a roughly 13 metres (43 ft) long squid has an eye up to 27 cm (11 in) in diameter, giving a rough "length to eye-diameter"-ratio of 1:48, then the theoretical squid Magnus described, given the same ratio, would be roughly 73–92 m (240–302 ft) long.

=== Christen Jensøn (1646) ===
The first description of the kraken by name is found in the Norwegian glossary of Christen Jensøn (or Jenssøn) from Askvoll, published in 1646, where he describes the Kraken as a sea monster with many arms that grabs boats down into the abyss.

=== Francesco Negri (1700) ===
A creature called "sciu-crak" (cf. Norwegian: sjø-krake, [ʂøː-²kɾɑː.kə], "sea-kraken") is known from the Italian writer Francesco Negri in his Viaggio settentrionale (Padua, 1700), a travelogue about Scandinavia. The book describes the sciu-crak as a massive "fish" which was many-horned or many-armed. The author also distinguished this from a sea serpent.

Although it has been stated that the kraken (Norwegian: krake) was "described for the first time by that name" in the writings of Erik Pontoppidan, bishop of Bergen, in his Det første Forsøg paa Norges naturlige Historie, "The First Attempt at [a] Natural History of Norway" (1752–53), a German source qualified Pontoppidan to be the first source on kraken available to be read in the German language. A description of the kraken had been anticipated by Hans Egede.

=== Hans Egede (1729) ===
Hans Egede was possibly the first to have described the kraken using direct period folklore informants, in his Det gamle Grønlands nye perlustration (1729; Ger. t. 1730; tr. Description of Greenland, 1745), drawing from the fables of his native region, the Nordlandene len of Norway, then under Danish rule. (Note: The marginal header in the original is "Fabel om Kraken i Nordlandene" which refers specifically to the len of Nordland under Danish rule; this is not just modern Norway's Nordland county, but includes the counties that lies farther north. Egede was born in Harstad, in Nordland (len) during his life. The town is now part of Troms Finnmark, Norway.)

According to his Norwegian informants, the kraken's body measured many miles in length, and when it surfaced it seemed to cover the whole sea, further described as "having many heads and a number of claws". With its claws it captured its prey, which included ships, men, fish, and animals, carrying its victims back into the depths. Egede conjectured that the krake was equatable to the monster that the Icelanders call hafgufa, but as he had not obtained anything related to him through an informant, he had difficulty describing the latter (see § Hafgufa). (Note: Machan quoted Egede's text proper regarding some sort of "Bæst" or "forfærdelige Hav-Dyr [terrible sea-animal]" witnessed in the Colonies (Greenland), but ignored the footnote which tells much on the krake. Ruickbie quoted Egede's footnote, but decided to place it under his entry for "Hafgufa".)

According to the lore of Norwegian fishermen, they could mount upon the fish-attracting kraken as if it were a sand-bank (Fiske-Grund 'fishing shoal'), but if they ever had the misfortune to capture the kraken, getting it entangled on their hooks, the only way to avoid destruction was to pronounce its name to make it go back to its depths. Egede also wrote that the krake fell under the general category of "sea spectre" (Danish: søe-trold og [søe]-spøgelse), (Note: The Norwegian trold (troll) can signify not just a giant, but spøkelser as well.) adding that "the Drow" (Norwegian: Drauen, definite form) was another being within that sea spectre classification (compare Norwegian: drauv, see sea draugr). (Note: Reference to the sea spectre ("phantom") was added in the English margin header: "A Norway Tale of Kraken, a pretended phantom", but that reference is wanting in the Danish original. It was already noted that the original wording localizes the legend specifically to Nordlandene len, not Norway altogether.)

=== Erik Pontoppidan (1753) ===
Erik Pontoppidan's Det første Forsøg paa Norges naturlige Historie (1752, actually volume 2, 1753) made several claims regarding kraken, including the notion that the creature was sometimes mistaken for a group of small islands with fish swimming in-between, Norwegian fishermen often took the risk of trying to fish over kraken, since the catch was so plentiful (hence the saying "You must have fished on Kraken").

However, there was also the danger to seamen of being engulfed by the whirlpool when it submerged, and this whirlpool was compared to Norway's famed Moskstraumen often known as "the Maelstrom".

Pontoppidan also described the destructive potential of the giant beast: "it is said that if [the creature's arms] were to lay hold of the largest man-of-war, they would pull it down to the bottom".

Kraken purportedly exclusively fed for several months, then spent the following few months emptying its excrement, and the thickened clouded water attracted fish. Later Henry Lee commented that the supposed excreta may have been the discharge of ink by a cephalopod.

=== Søren Richart Hagerup (ca. 1770) ===
An anonymous glossary from Surnadal from around 1770, probably written by Søren Richart Hagerup, also gives a description of the kraken as a giant fish having tree-like fins, and able to sink a whole boat.

== Mythical identifications ==
=== Hafgufa ===
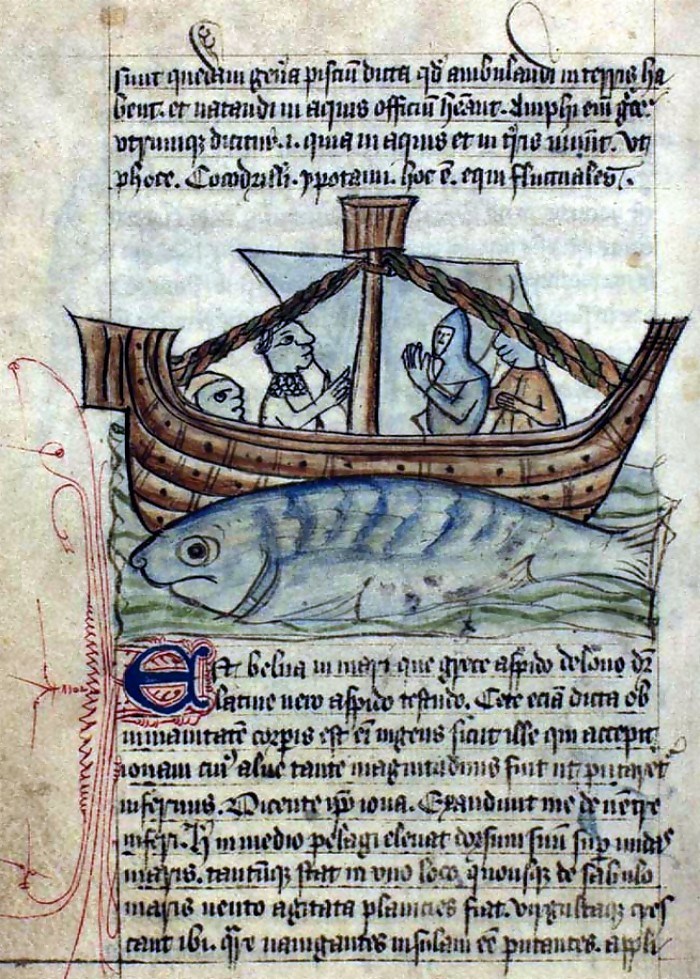
The Aspidochelone, a fabled sea creature, from a 1400–1425 bestiary in the Danish Royal Library. The hafgufa is often compared to the Aspidochelone myth.

Hans Egede made the aforementioned identification of krake as being the same as the hafgufa of the Icelanders, though he seemed to have obtained the information indirectly from the medieval Norwegian treatise, the Speculum Regale (or King's Mirror, c. 1250). (Note: Speculum Regale Islandicum after Thormodus Torfæus, as elocuted by Egede. The Speculum contains a detailed digression about whales and seals in the seas around Iceland and Greenland, where one finds description of the hafgufa.) Later, David Crantz in Historie von Grönland (History of Greenland, 1765) also reported kraken and the hafgufa to be synonymous. An English translator of the King's Mirror in 1917 opted to translate hafgufa as kraken.

The hafgufa (described as the largest of the sea monsters, inhabiting the Greenland Sea) from the King's Mirror (Note: Bushnell speaks of Icelandic literature (in the 13th century) also, but strictly speaking, Örvar-Odds saga contains the mention of hafgufa and lyngbakr only in the later recension, dated to the late 14th century.) continues to be identified with the kraken in some scholarly writings, and if this equivalence were allowed, the kraken-hafgufa's range would extend, at least legendarily, to waters approaching Helluland (Baffin Island, Canada), as described in Örvar-Odds saga. (Note: Mouritsen & Styrbæk (2018) (book on inkfish) distinguishes the whale lyngbakr with the monster hafgufa.)

The anonymously written Historia Norwegiæ also states that the hafgufa inhabited a deep fjord, accompanied by other sea beasts such as the ‘hafstramb’ , a gigantic creature with no head nor tail, the ‘hrosshvalr’, depicted as a hippocampus (half horse, half fish) in imagery, as well as recognizable monstrosities like the Charybdis and Scylla.

==== Contrary opinion ====
The description of the hafgufa in the King's Mirror suggests a garbled eyewitness account of what was actually a whale, at least according to the Grönlands historiske Mindesmaerker. Halldór Hermannsson also reads the work as describing the hafgufa as a type of whale. The whale motif suits the etymology, meaning "sea reeker", which could stem from a whale blowing water.

The King's Mirror does somewhat extensively reference maritime animal life, including: twenty-one whale species; six seal varieties; description of the walrus; ‘sea-hedges’; as well as the legendary likes of the merman, mermaid, and kraken. While the whales, specifically within the Icelandic oceans, are explained in fair amounts of detail — such: as those called ‘blubber-cutters’, the most numerous whales, growing to twenty ells in length, and noted as harmless to ships and men; the porpoise, which grows to a maximum of five ells; and the ‘caaing whale’, growing to lengths of seven ells — the tales of other, more dangerous and mythical ‘fish’ leave more room for ambiguity, and thus, interrogation.

Finnur Jónsson (1920) having arrived at the opinion that the kraken probably represented an inkfish (squid/octopus), as discussed earlier, expressed his skepticism towards the persistently accepted notion that the kraken originated from the hafgufa.

== Taxonomic identifications ==
=== Erik Pontoppidan (kraken's young) ===
Erik Pontoppidan wrote of a possible specimen of the kraken, "perhaps a young and careless one", which washed ashore and died in 1680 in Ulvangen near Alstahaug Church and the island of Dønna, Norway. He observed that it had long "arms", and guessed that it must have been crawling like a snail/slug with the use of these "arms", but got lodged in the landscape during the process. 20th-century malacologist Paul Bartsch conjectured this to have been a giant squid, as did literary scholar Finnur Jónsson.

However, what Pontoppidan actually stated regarding what creatures he regarded as candidates for the kraken is quite complicated.

Pontoppidan did tentatively identify the kraken to be a sort of giant crab, stating that the alias krabben best describes its characteristics. (Note: Cf. kraken aka "the crab-fish" (Swedish: Krabbfisken) described by Swedish magnate Jacob Wallenberg in Min son på galejan ("My son on the galley", 1781): Kraken, also called the crab-fish, which is not that huge, for heads and tails counted, he is reckoned not to overtake the length of our Öland off Kalmar [i.e., 85 mi or 137 kilometres] ... He stays at the sea floor, constantly surrounded by innumerable small fishes, who serve as his food and are fed by him in return: for his meal, (if I remember correctly what E. Pontoppidan writes,) lasts no longer than three months, and another three are then needed to digest it. His excrements nurture in the following an army of lesser fish, and for this reason, fishermen plumb after his resting place ... Gradually, Kraken ascends to the surface, and when he is at ten to twelve fathoms [18 to 22 m; 60 to 72 ft] below, the boats had better move out of his vicinity, as he will shortly thereafter burst up, like a floating island, gushing out currnts like at Trollhättan [Trollhätteströmmar], his dreadful nostrils and making an ever-expanding ring of whirlpool, reaching many miles around. Could one doubt that this is the Leviathan of Job?)

However, further down in his writing, compares the creature to some creature(s) from Pliny, Book IX, Ch. 4: the sea-monster called arbor, with tree-branch like multiple arms, (Note: This is called arbor marinus by Denys-Montfort, and equated with his kraken octopus, as discussed below.) complicated by the fact that Pontoppidan adds another of Pliny's creature called rota with eight arms, and conflates them into one organism. Pontoppidan is suggesting this is an ancient example of kraken, as a modern commentator analyzes.

Pontoppidan then declared the kraken to be a type of polypus (=octopus) (Note: Linnaeus's polypus is 'octopus' and glossed thus by Heuvelmans, but since Pontoppidan resorts to variant spellings such as polype, this could lead to confusion. Gessner's polypus was an octopus as well.) or "starfish", particularly the kind Gessner called Stella Arborescens, later identifiable as one of the northerly ophiurids or possibly more specifically as one of the Gorgonocephalids or even the genus Gorgonocephalus (though no longer regarded as family/genus under order Ophiurida, but under Phrynophiurida in current taxonomy). (Note: Stella Arborescens was later classed in the old-Astrophyton genus containing several species, but it would now be obsolete to say Stella Arborescens belongs to the Astrophyton genus which now admits only a single New World species. One genus that would be applicable would be Gorgonocephalus because the 3 species A. linckii, A. eucnemis, A. lamarcki which occur in northern Europe according to Lyman, all of which are given modern accepted assignments as Gorgonocephalus spp.) (Note: The original passage in the English translation reads: the Kraken ... with his many large horns or branches, as it were springing up from its body, which is round ... Both these descriptions [arbor and kraken] confirm my former suppositions, namely, that this Sea-animal belongs to the Polype or Star-fish species ... It seems to be of that Polypus kind which is called by the Dutch Zee-sonne, by Rondeletius and Gessner Stella Arborescens.)

This ancient arbor (admixed rota and thus made eight-armed) seems like an octopus at first blush but with additional data, the ophiurid starfish now appears Pontoppidan's preferential choice.

The ophiurid starfish seems further fortified when he notes that "starfish" called "Medusa's heads" (caput medusæ; pl. capita medusæ) are considered to be "the young of the great sea-kraken" by local lore. Pontoppidan ventured the 'young krakens' may rather be the eggs (ova) of the starfish. Pontopiddan was satisfied that "Medusa's heads" was the same as the foregoing starfish (Stella arborensis of old), (Note: Pontoppidan noted that Medusa's head (Lat. pl. capita Medusæ) is identified as Stella Arborescens by the naturalist Griffith Hughes.) but "Medusa's heads" were something found ashore aplenty across Norway according to von Bergen, who thought it absurd these could be young "Kraken" since that would mean the seas would be full of (the adults). The "Medusa's heads" appear to be a Gorgonocephalid, with Gorgonocephalus spp. being tentatively suggested. (Note: Heuvelmans refers to "Gorgon's head", which conservatively speaking refers to family Gorgonocephalidae, but there is also the Gorgonocephalus genus, of which Gorgonocephalus caputmedusae is the modern accepted name of Astrophyton linckii which Lyman hesitantly guesses may be Linnaeus's "Medusa's head"[?], and G. eucnemis was F. J. Bell's prime candidate for the proper name of "Shetland Argus", which he thought may be unreliably referred to by Linnaeus and Pontoppidan by the name of Asterias caput-medusæ.) (Note: Actually there is even the species "Gorgon's head" Astrocladus euryale, whose old name was Asterias euryale, which Blumenbach claimed was one of the species that Scandinavian naturalists considered kraken's children. But A. euryale inhabits South African waters. Blumenbach also named Euryale verrucosum, old name of Astrocladus exiguus which occur in the Pacific.) (Note: Euryale verrucosum Lamarck is matched to accepted name Astrocladus exiguus, which occurs in the Pacific.)

Medusa's head, 'kraken's young' according to fishermen's lore

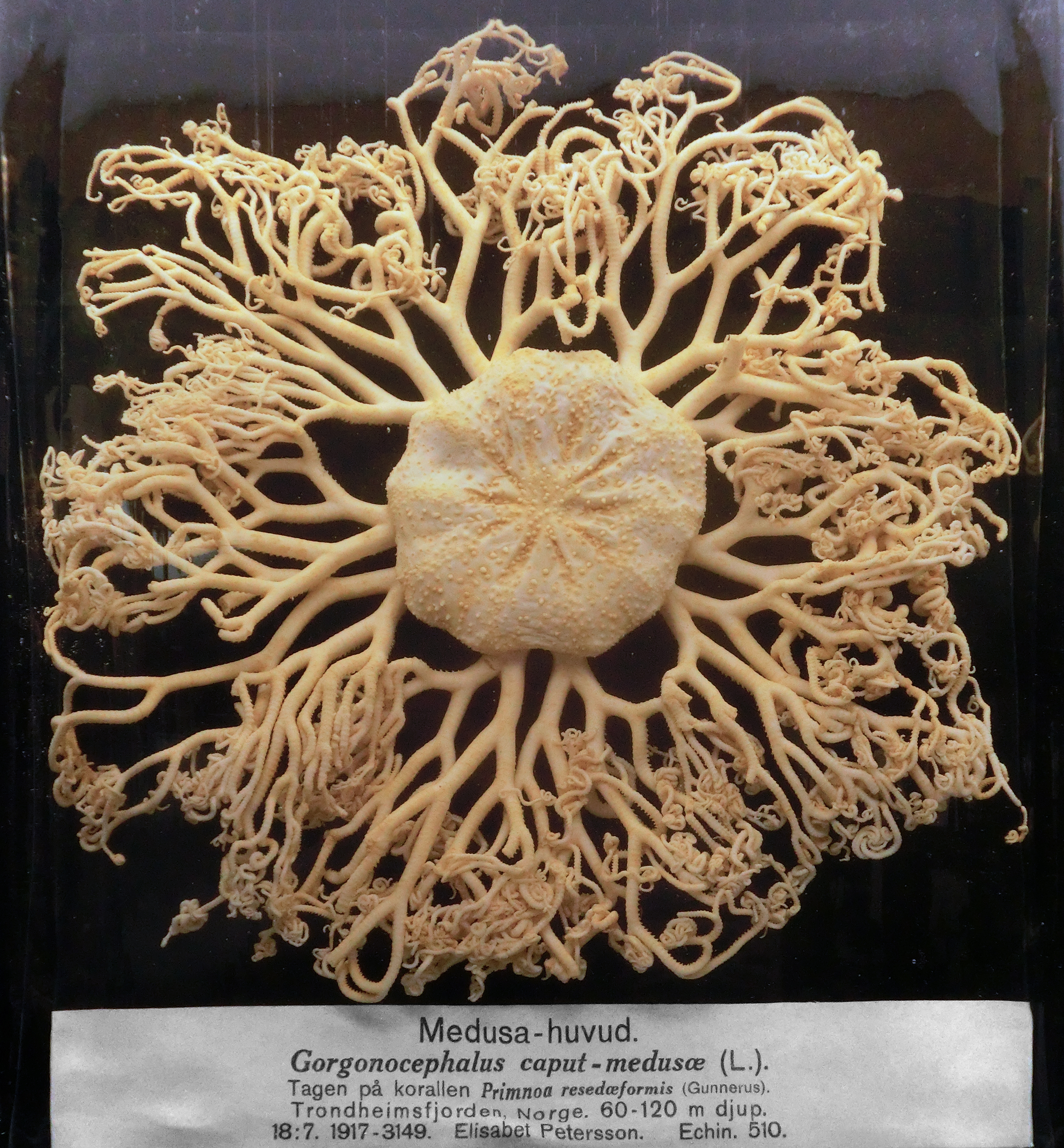
G. caputmedusae (old name Astrophyton linckii), possibly Pontoppidan's "Medusa's head"? according to Lyman; native to the North Sea.

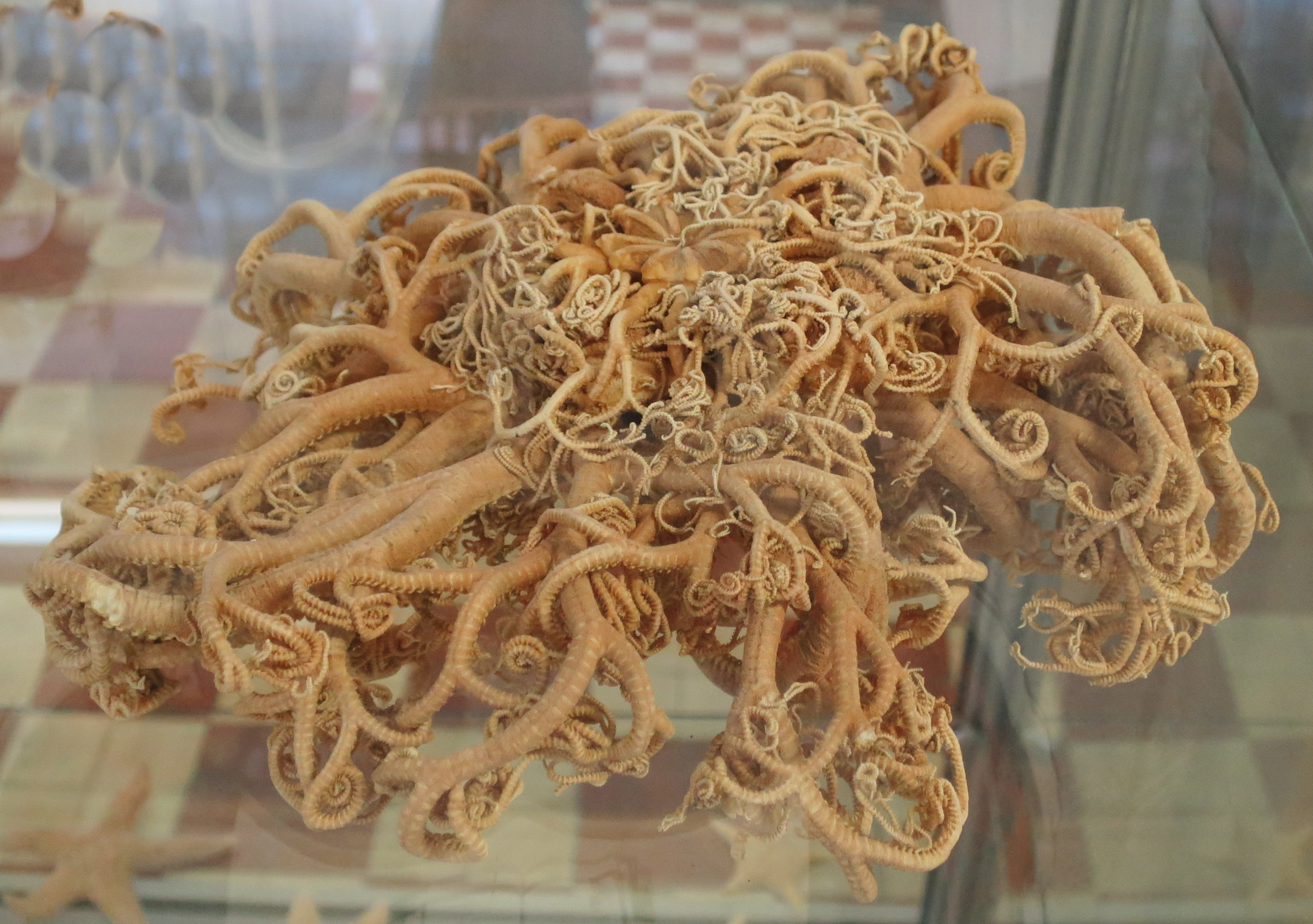
G. eucnemis. "Shetland Argus", according to Bell; possibly Pontoppidan's caput medusa[e] also; this a more far-ranging species.

In the end though, Pontoppidan again appears ambivalent, stating "Polype, or Star-fish [belongs to] the whole genus of Kors-Trold ['cross troll'], ... some that are much larger, .. even the very largest ... of the ocean", and concluding that "this Krake must be of the Polypus kind". By "this Krake" here, he apparently meant in particular the giant polypus octopus of Carteia from Pliny, Book IX, Ch. 30 (though he only used the general nickname "ozaena" 'stinkard' for the octopus kind). (Note: The ozaena nickname as literally 'stinkard' for the octopus on account of its reek is given in the side-by-sidy translation by Gerhardt. The polypus of Carteia tract, is thus given, but the Latin quoted by Pontoppidan "Namque et afflatu terribli canes agebat..." is blanked Gerhardt and only given in modern English, "were pitted against something uncanny, for by its awful breath it tormented the dogs, which it now scourged with the ends of its tentacles".. because it represents an interpolation by Pliny.)

=== Denys de Montfort ===
In 1802, the French malacologist Pierre Denys de Montfort recognized the existence of two "species" of giant octopuses in Histoire Naturelle Générale et Particulière des Mollusques, an encyclopedic description of mollusks.

The "colossal giant" was supposedly the same as Pliny's "monstrous polypus", which was a man-killer which ripped apart (Latin: distrahit) shipwrecked people and divers. (Note: Natural History, Book IX, Loeb edition. According to Pliny's source, Trebius Niger: "..for it struggles with him by coiling round him and it swallows him with sucker-cups and drags him asunder by its multiple suction, when it attacks men that have been shipwrecked or are diving".) Montfort accompanied his publication with an engraving representing the giant octopus poised to destroy a three-masted ship.

Whereas the "kraken octopus", was the most gigantic animal on the planet in the writer's estimation, dwarfing Pliny's "colossal octopus"/"monstrous polypus", and identified here as the aforementioned Pliny's monster, called the arbor marinus.

Montfort also listed additional wondrous fauna as identifiable with the kraken. There was Christian Franz Paullini's monstrum marinum glossed as a sea crab (German: Seekrabbe), which a later biologist has suggested to be one of the Hyas spp. It was also described as resembling Gessner's Cancer heracleoticus crab alleged to appear off the Finnish coast. von Bergen's "bellua marina omnium vastissima" (meaning 'vastest-of-all sea-beast'), namely the trolwal ('ogre whale', 'troll whale') of Northern Europe, and the Teufelwal ('devil whale') of the Germans follow in the list.

==== Angola octopus, pictured in St. Malo ====
It is in his chapter on the "colossal octopus" that Montfort provides the contemporary eyewitness example of a group of sailors who encounter the giant off the coast of Angola, who afterwards deposited a pictorial commemoration of the event as a votive offering at St. Thomas's chapel in Saint-Malo, France. Based on that picture, Montfort drew a "colossal octopus" attacking a ship, and included the engraving in his book. However, an English author recapitulating Montfort's account of it attaches an illustration of it, which was captioned: "The Kraken supposed a sepia or cuttlefish", while attributing Montfort.

Hamilton's book was not alone in recontextualizing Montfort's ship-assaulting colossal octopus as a kraken; for instance, the piece on the "kraken" by American zoologist Packard. (Note: Packard: "Denys Montfort took the cue, and.. represented a "kraken octopod" in the act of scuttling a three-master..")

The Frenchman Montfort used the obsolete scientific name Sepia octopodia but called it a poulpe, which means "octopus" to this day; meanwhile the English-speaking naturalists had developed the convention of calling the octopus "eight-armed cuttle-fish", as did Packard and Hamilton, even though modern-day speakers are probably unfamiliar with that name.

==== Warship Ville de Paris ====
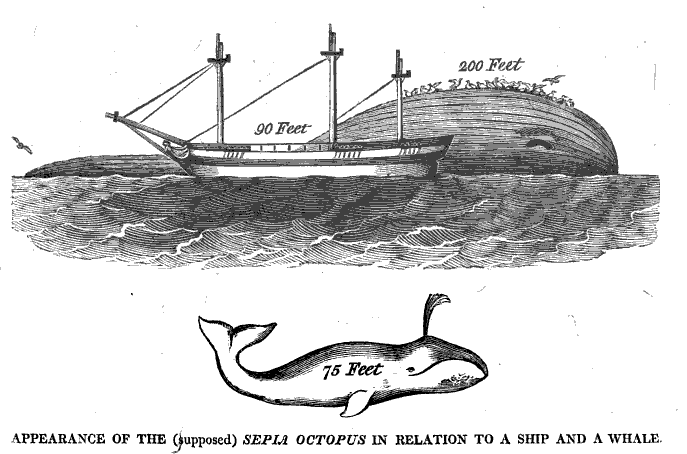
The Niagara sighting. 60-metre (200 ft) creature allegedly seen afloat in 1813, depicted as octopus by a naturalist

Having accepted as fact that a colossal octopus was capable of dragging a ship down, Montfort made a more daring hypothesis. He attempted to blame colossal octopuses for the loss of ten warships under British control in 1782, including six captured French men-of-war. The disaster began with the distress signal fired by the captured ship of the line Ville de Paris which was then swallowed up by parting waves, and the other ships coming to aid shared the same fate. He proposed, by process of elimination, that such an event could only be accounted for as the work of many octopuses.

But it has been pointed out the sinkings have simply been explained by the presence of a storm, and there appeared a surviving witness that stated they ran into a hurricane. Montfort's involving octopuses as complicit has been characterized as "reckless falsity".

It has also been noted that Montfort once quipped to a friend, DeFrance: "If my entangled ship is accepted, I will make my 'colossal poulpe' overthrow a whole fleet".

==== Niagara ====
The ship Niagara on course from Lisbon to New York in 1813 logged a sighting of a marine animal spotted afloat at sea. It was claimed to be 60 m (200 feet) in length, covered in shells, and had many birds alighted upon it.

Samuel Latham Mitchill reported this, and referencing Montfort's kraken, reproduced an illustration of it as an octopus.

=== Giant squid (Architeuthis) ===
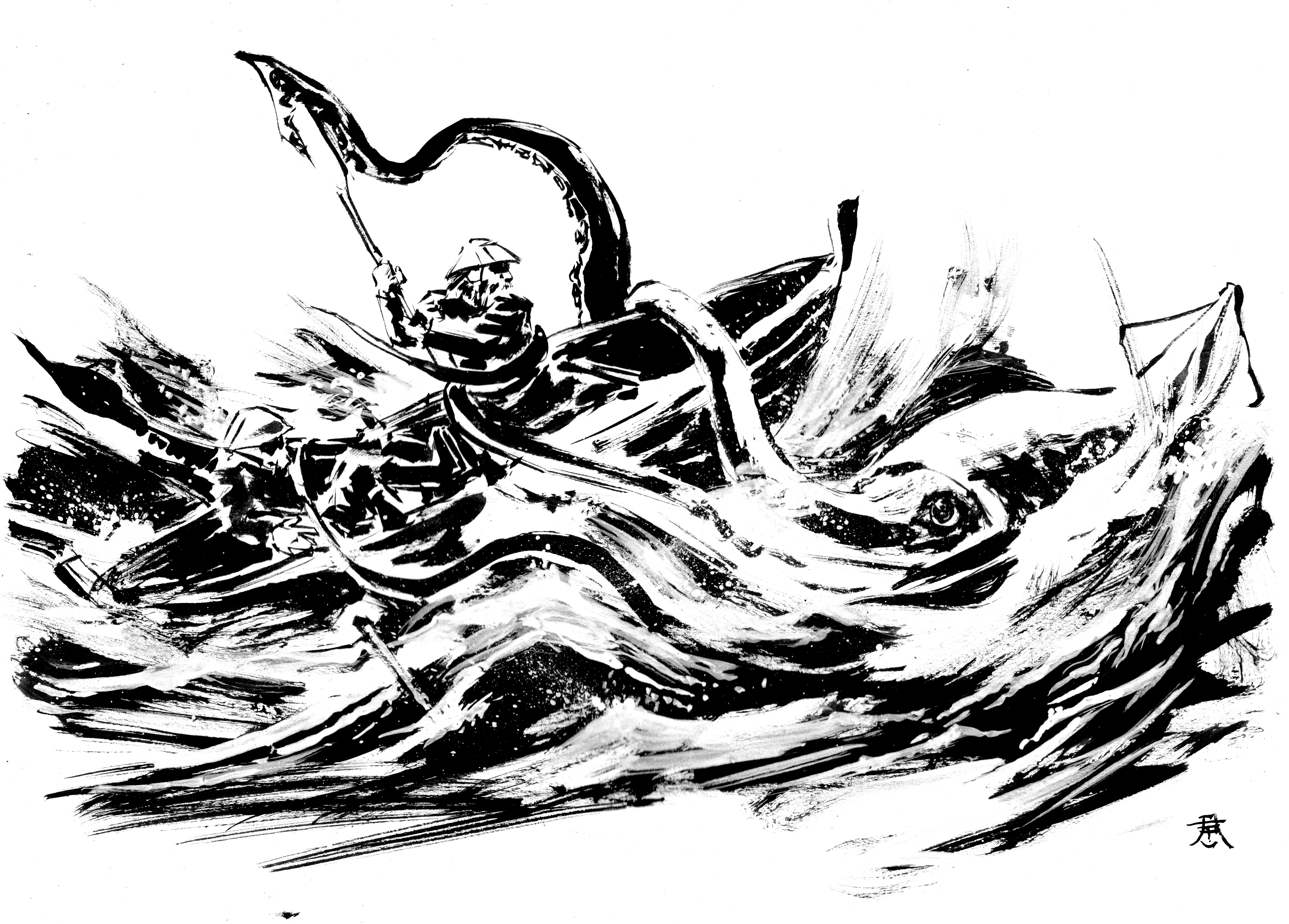
Modern artistic depiction of a giant squid attacking two fisherman.

A common conception of the kraken has been that it originates from sightings of giant squid.

The piece of squid recovered by the French ship Alecton in 1861, discussed by Henry Lee in his chapter on the "Kraken", would later be identified as a giant squid, Architeuthis by A. E. Verrill.

After a specimen of the giant squid, Architeuthis, was discovered by Rev. Moses Harvey and published in science by Professor A. E. Verrill, commentators have remarked on this cephalopod as possibly explaining the legendary kraken.

A similar discovery was made in 1873 by Theophilus Piccot and his assistant while fishing for herring in Newfoundland's Conception Bay. As they fished, they saw some large mass floating before them, and upon further investigation, they discovered that the creature had a beak the size of a “six gallon keg”, tentacles greater in height than the two men, and the ability to spew ink when threatened. Although this beast was able to escape the two men, Piccot did manage to hack two of the creature's tentacles off with a hatchet he had on board. After bringing the biological evidence to light, it was later concluded that squids of the giant variety do exist in our seas. Moreover, it was uncovered that these squid were not only larger than whales, but preyed upon them.

== Iconography ==
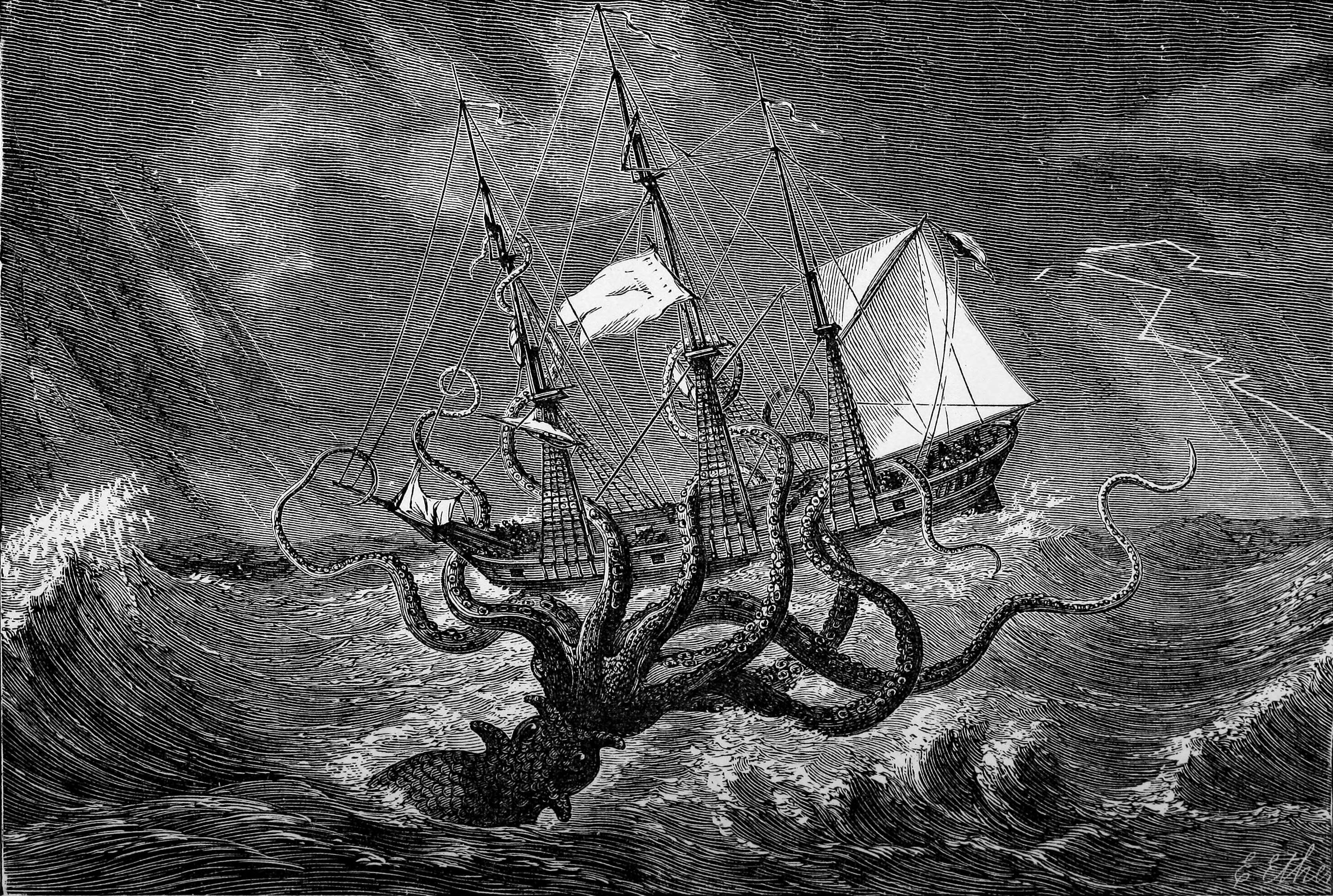
"Kraken of the imagination". John Gibson, 1887.

As to the iconography, Denys-Montfort's engraving of the "colossal octopus" is often shown, though this differs from the kraken according to the French malacologist, and commentators are found characterizing the ship attack representing the "kraken octopod".

And after Denys-Monfort's illustration, various publishers produced similar illustrations depicting the kraken attacking a ship.

Whereas the kraken was described by Egede as having "many Heads and a Number of Claws", the creature is also depicted to have spikes or horns, at least in illustrations of creatures which commentators have conjectured to be krakens. The "bearded whale" shown on an early map (pictured above) is conjectured to be a kraken perhaps (cf. §Olaus Magnus below). Also, there was an alleged two-headed and horned monster that beached ashore in Dingle, County Kerry, Ireland, thought to be a giant cephalopod, of which there was a picture/painting made by the discoverer. He made a travelling show of his work on canvas, as introduced in a book on the kraken.

=== Olaus Magnus' Carta marina ===
While Swedish writer Olaus Magnus did not use the term kraken, various sea-monsters were illustrated on his famous map, the Carta marina (1539). Modern writers have since tried to interpret various sea creatures illustrated as a portrayal of the kraken.

Ashton's Curious Creatures (1890) drew significantly from Olaus' work and even quoted the Swede's description of the horned whale. But he identified the kraken as a cephalopod and devoted much space on Pliny's and Olaus' descriptions of the giant "polypus", noting that Olaus had represented the kraken-polypus as a crayfish or lobster in his illustrations, and even reproducing the images from both Olaus' book (Note: See the black and white woodcut reprodcution, Fig., right (Actually from Lee (1883), a different book; the same picture, without caption appears in the 1890 book.) and his map. In Olaus's book, the giant lobster illustration is uncaptioned, but appears right above the words "De Polypis (on the octopus)", which is the chapter heading. Henry Lee was also of the opinion that the multi-legged lobster was a misrepresentation of a reported cephalopod attack on a ship.

The legend in Olaus' map fails to clarify on the lobster-like monster "M", (Note: However, elsewhere on the map, the giant lobster is called a lobster (Medieval Latin: gambarus > Latin: cammarus > Ancient Greek: κάμμαρος) in the legend; this is the one shown struggling with a one-horned beast.) depicted off the island of Iona. (Note: Iona is of course associated with the Irish saints, Columcille and St. Brendan.) However, the associated writing called the Auslegung adds that this section of the map extends from Ireland to the "Insula Fortunata". This "Fortunate Island" was a destination on St. Brendan's Voyage, one of whose adventures was the landing of the crew on an island-sized monstrous fish, (Note: This fish has a name: Jasconius.) as depicted in a 17th-century engraving (cf. figure right); (Note: The "Insula Fortunate" is situated next to St. Brendan's in the engraving in Caspar Plautius's book (1621), engraved by Wolfgang Kilian) and this monstrous fish, according to Bartholin was the aforementioned hafgufa, which has already been discussed above as one of the creatures of lore equated with kraken.

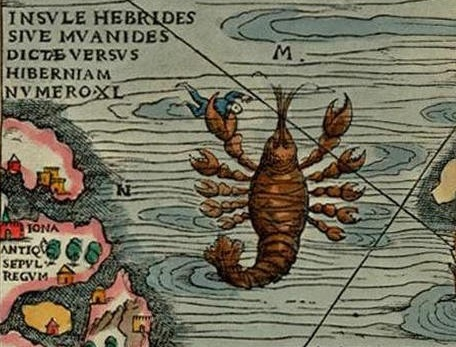
Monster "M" on the Carta marina (1539) (Note: Ashton (1890). Curious Creatures p. 244. Ashton continues the discussion on pp. 262–263 using the reproduction of Olaus' woodcut, the same―except for bearing no caption― as fig. right, from Lee's Sea Monsters Unmasked (1883).)

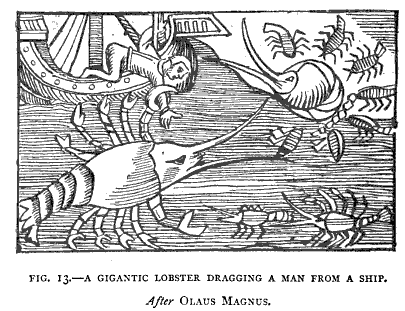
Ship-attacking crustacean, from Lee's Sea Monsters Unmasked (1883), after Olaus' (1555) A Description

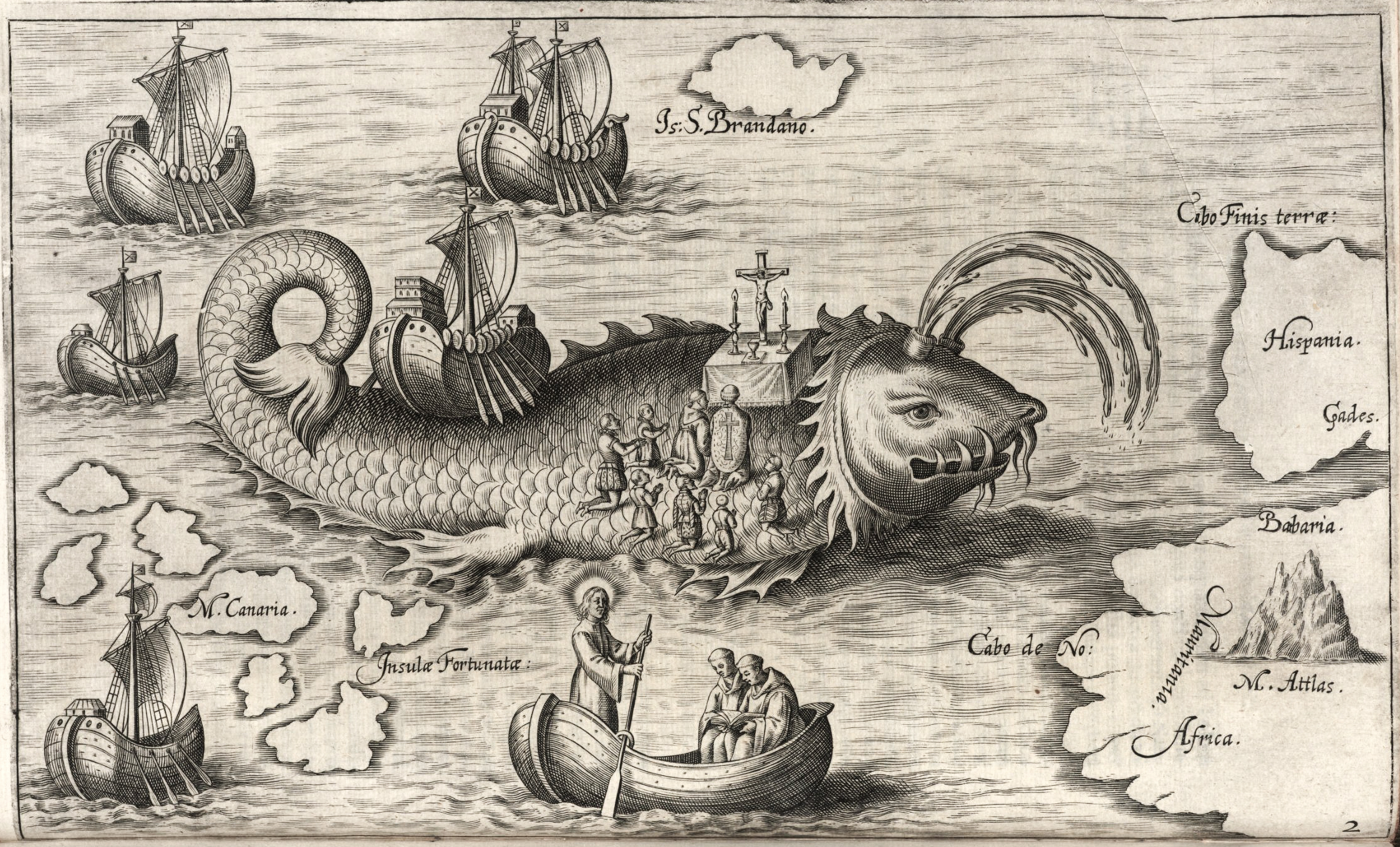
A giant fish encountered by St. Brendan. "Insula Fortunata" marked near it.

== Taxonomical influences ==
=== Linnaeus's microcosmus ===
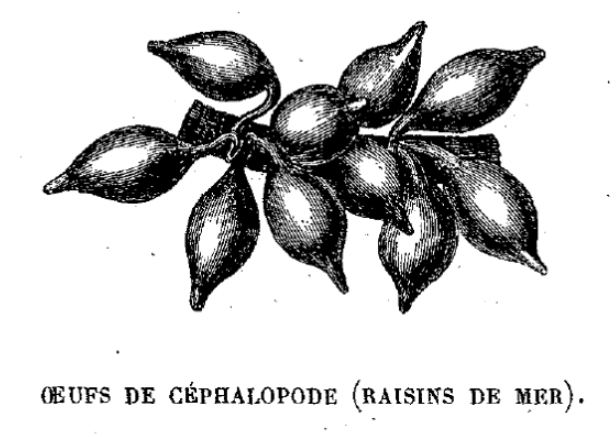
Sea-grapes, or cephalopod eggs

The famous Swedish 18th-century naturalist Carl Linnaeus in his Systema Naturae (1735) described a fabulous genus Microcosmus a "body covered with various heterogeneous [other bits]" (Latin: Corpus variis heterogeneis tectum). (Note: Lovén gave the text as tegmen ex heterogeneis compilatis, but this reading occurs in the Latin-Swedish 6th edition of 1748. Whereas the 2nd edition has "testa" instead of "tegmen".)

Linnaeus cited four sources under Microcosmus, namely: (Note: Lóven indicates that these sources appeared in print in the second edition of SN, but as a piece of marginalia, he notes these sources were also given in Linnaeus's 1733 lectures. The lecture was preserved in the Notes taken by Mennander, held by the Royal Library, Stockholm.) Thomas Bartholin's cetus (≈whale) type hafgufa; Christian Franz Paullini's monstrum marinum aforementioned; and Francesco Redi's giant tunicate (Ascidia) in Italian and Latin.

According to the Swedish zoologist Lovén, the common name kraken was added to the 6th edition of Systema Naturae (1748), which was a Latin version augmented with Swedish names (in blackletter), but such Swedish text is wanting on this particular entry, e.g. in the copy held by NCSU. It is true that the 7th edition of 1748, which adds German vernacular names, identifies the Microcosmus as "sea-grape" (German: Meertrauben), referring to a cluster of cephalopod eggs. (Note: "Meer=Trauben" already appeared in the 1740 Latin-German edition. The 9th edition of 1956, which is said to be the same as the 6th edition, also leaves a blanc instead of adding the French vernacular name.) (Note: An illustration of sea-grapes (French: raisins de mer) appears on Moquin-Tandon (1865), p. 309.)

Also, the Frenchman Louis Figuier in 1860 misstated that Linnaeus included in his classification a cephalopod called "Sepia microcosmus" (Note: As noted previously, Sepia genus represents cuttlefish in modern taxonomy, Linnaeus's genus Sepia was essentially "cephalopods", and his Sepia octopodia was the common octopus.) in his first edition of Systema Naturae (1735). Figuier's mistake has been pointed out, and Linnaeus never represented the kraken as such a cephalopod. Nevertheless, the error has been perpetuated by even modern-day writers. (Note: The notion that Linnaeus mentioned the kraken in 1735 has been taken to be fact by Bushnell (2019), p. 56, and Richard Ellis in 2006 also assumed the Sepia microcosmus was present in the first edition, concluding therefore it was removed by the time a later edition appeared.)

=== Linnaeus' System of Nature in English ===
Thomas Pennant, an Englishman, had written of Sepia octopodia as "eight-armed cuttlefish" (we call it octopus today), and documented reported cases in the Indian isles where specimen grow to 2 fathoms [3.7 m; 12 ft] wide, "and each arms 9 fathoms [16 m; 54 ft] long". This was added as a species Sepia octopusa [sic.] by William Turton in his English version of Linnaeus' System of Nature, together with the account of the 9-fathom-long (16 m; 54 ft) armed octopuses.

The trail stemming from Linnaeus, eventually leading to such pieces on the kraken written in English by the naturalist James Wilson for the Blackwood's Edinburgh Magazine in 1818 sparked an awareness of the kraken among 19th-century English, hence Tennyson's poem, "The Kraken".

=== Paleo-cephalopod (Triassic kraken) ===
Paleontologist Mark McMenamin and his spouse Dianna Schulte McMenamin claimed that an ancient, giant cephalopod resembling the legendary kraken caused the deaths of ichthyosaurs during the Triassic period. However, this theory has been met with criticisms by multiple researchers.

=== Late Cretaceous giant octopodes ===
In 2026, an international team of researchers, having studied in detail 27 fossilized octopod jaws from outer-shelf deposits of Japan and Vancouver Island, came to the conclusion that giant finned octopodes of the genus Nanaimoteuthis were highly intelligent apex predators and possibly the largest animals in the Late Cretaceous seas. The researchers estimated Nanaimoteuthis jeletzkyi and N. haggarti to be 3-8 m and 7-19 m long, respectively, and stated that, based on the wear patterns on their jaws, these "krakens" fed on vertebrates with harder internal skeletons. The authors noted that top predators among both cephalopods and vertebrates arose as a result of convergent evolution, acquiring powerful jaws and losing external skeletons.

== Literary influences ==
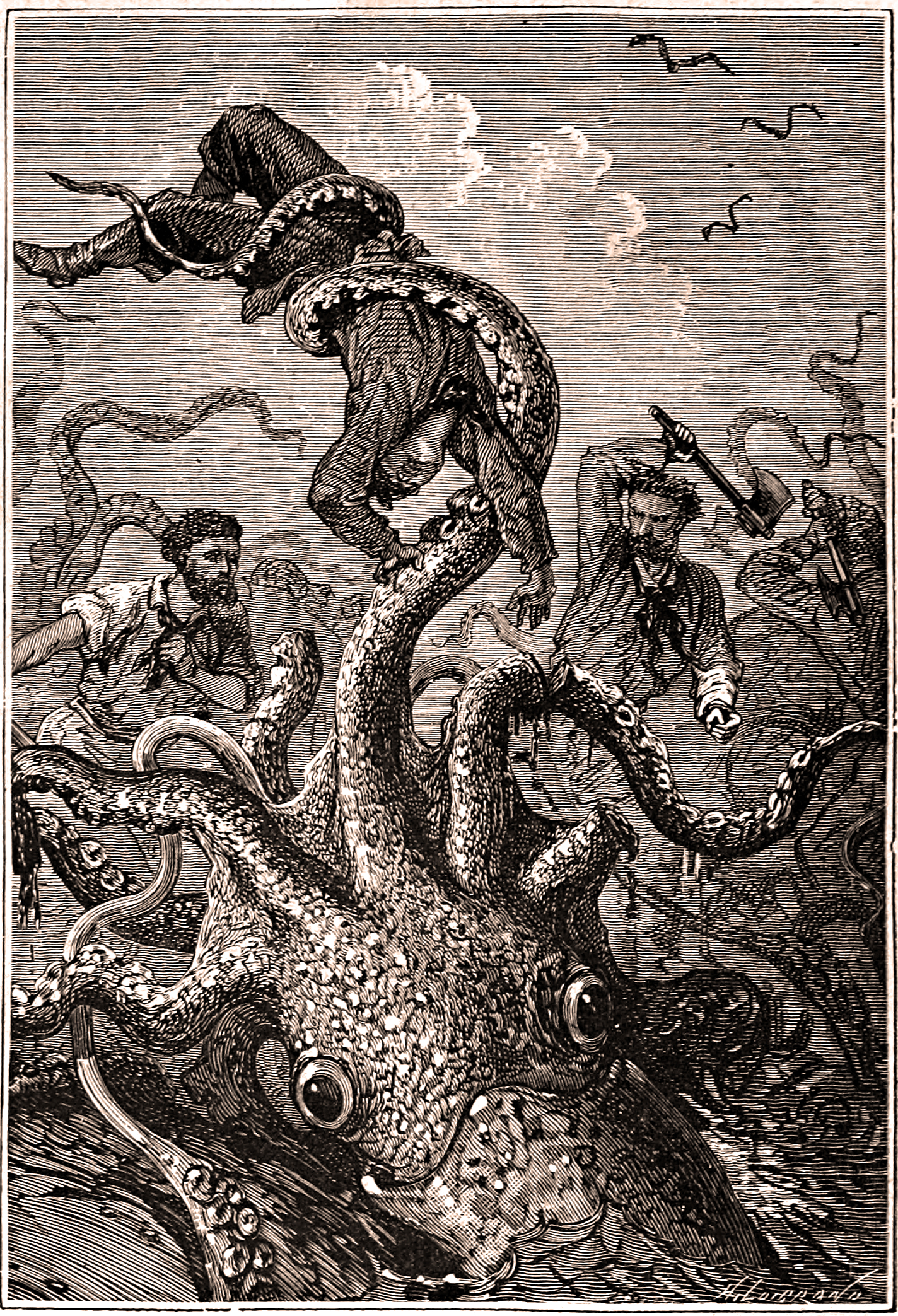
An illustration from the original 1870 edition of Twenty Thousand Leagues Under the Seas by Jules Verne

The French novelist Victor Hugo's Les Travailleurs de la mer (1866, "Toilers of the Sea") discusses the man-eating octopus, the kraken of legend, called pieuvre by the locals of the Channel Islands (in the Guernsey dialect, etc.). (Note: Hugo also produced an ink and wash sketch of the octopus.) Hugo's octopus later influenced Jules Verne's depiction of the kraken in Twenty Thousand Leagues Under the Seas, though Verne also drew on the real-life encounter the French ship Alecton had with what was probably a giant squid. It has been noted that Verne indiscriminately interchanged kraken with calmar (squid) and poulpe (octopus).

In the English-speaking world, examples in fine literature are Alfred Tennyson's 1830 irregular sonnet The Kraken and references in Herman Melville's 1851 novel Moby-Dick (Chapter 59 "Squid"),

== Modern use ==
Although fictional and the subject of myth, the legend of the Kraken continues to the present day, with numerous references in film, literature, television, and other popular culture topics.

Examples include: John Wyndham's novel The Kraken Wakes (1953), the Kraken of Marvel Comics, the 1981 film Clash of the Titans and its 2010 remake of the same name, and the Seattle Kraken professional ice hockey team. Krakens also appear in video games such as Sea of Thieves, God of War II, Return of the Obra Dinn and Dredge. The kraken was also featured in two of the Pirates of the Caribbean movies, as the pet of the fearsome Davy Jones in the 2006 film, Pirates of the Caribbean: Dead Man's Chest and appears in the film's sequel, At World's End. In George R.R. Martin's fantasy novel series, A Song of Ice and Fire and its HBO series adaptations, Game of Thrones and House of the Dragon, the mythical kraken is the sigil of House Greyjoy of the Iron Islands.

The character of Cthulhu, created by H.P. Lovecraft in 1928, also serves as a modern depiction of the kraken, as this giant, squid-like humanoid creature embodies the horror originating with the idea of the mythological serpent, often denoting apocalypse, death, or sin, as well as the more contemporary concept of bodily horror.

Two features on the surfaces of other celestial objects have been named after the Kraken. Kraken Mare, a major sea of liquid ethane and methane, is the largest known body of liquid on Saturn's moon Titan. Kraken Catena is a crater chain and possible tectonic fault on Neptune's moon Triton.

The Kraken Regiment (Ukrainian: Спецпідрозділ "Kraken", romanized: Spetspidrozdil "Kraken") is a Ukrainian military volunteer unit, formed by veterans of the Azov Regiment who adopted the mythical sea creature as their name. Their insignia uses an image of a giant squid.

== See also ==
- Akkorokamui
- Cetus
- Cthulhu
- Leviathan
- Globster
- Nanaimoteuthis
- Silonit
