= Christian Franz Paullini =

German physician and theologian (1643–1712)

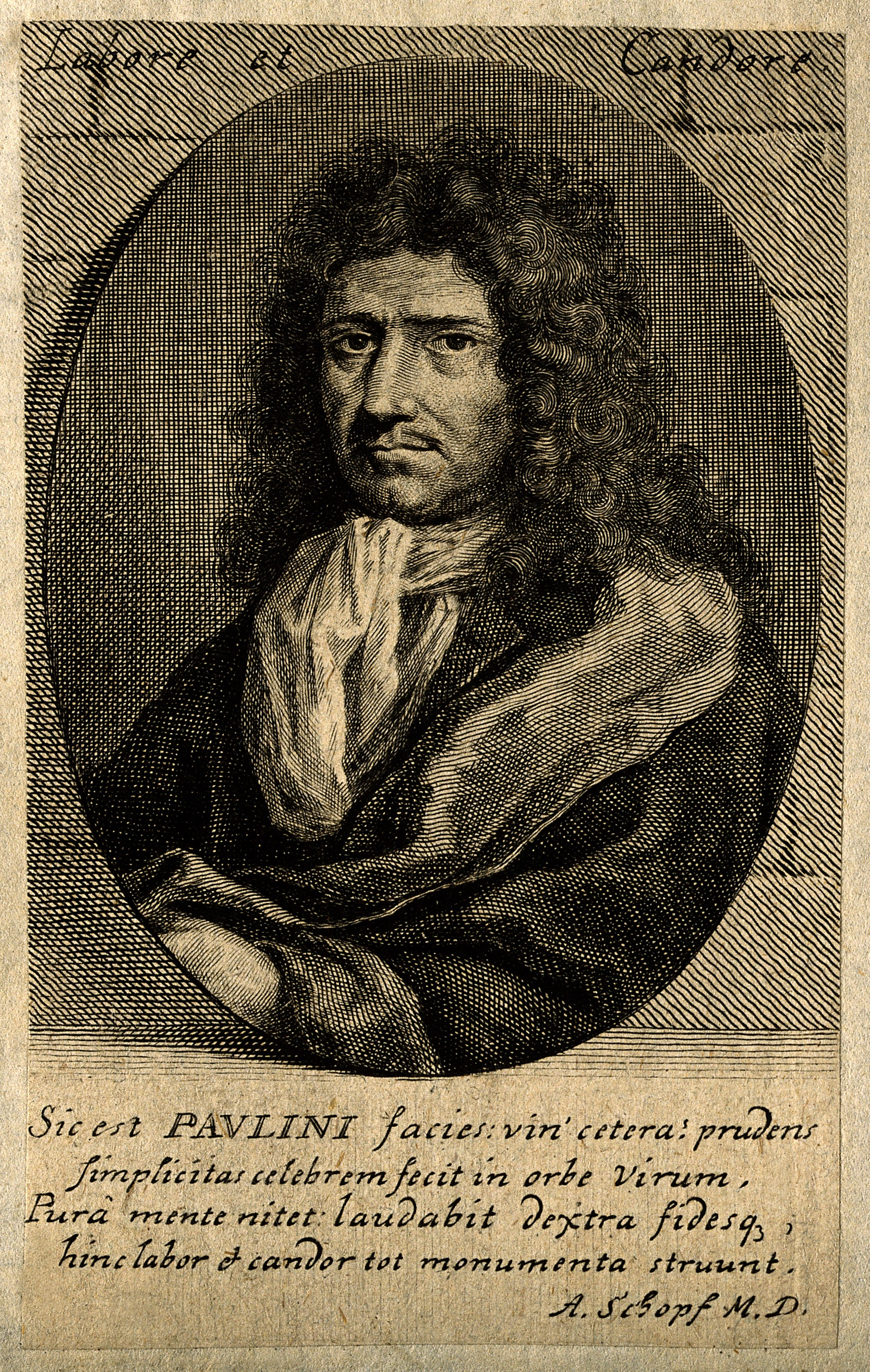
Christian Franz Paullini

Christian Franz Paullini (25 February 1643 – 10 June 1712) was a German physician, theologian, and writer.

== Biography ==
Paullini was born in Eisenach to a family of merchants and scholars. His parents wanted him to become a priest and his initial education was designed with this in mind, but Paullini was attracted to the medicinal arts and studied both theology and medicine.

He attended middle and secondary school in Thuringia and graduated from Coburg.

Paullini studied theology and medicine in Gdańsk, Königsberg, Rostock, Lübeck, Kiel and Copenhagen, was Magister Artium in Wittenberg, and received his MD in Leiden. Meanwhile, he completed study stays and courses in Cambridge, Oxford, Sweden, Norway and Iceland. Pauliini was the personal physician of the Prince-Bishop of Munster Christoph Bernhard von Galen and later of the Duke of Brunswick in Wolfenbüttel.

Paullini returned to Eisenach in 1685 and 1689 where he assumed the position of "Ducal Stadtphysicus" i.e. city doctor.

He was regarded as a polymath and corresponded with Leibniz and knew the German Jesuit scholar Athanasius Kircher. Paullini was a member of numerous learned societies such as the Fruitbearing Society, Pegnesischer Blumenorden and German Academy of Sciences Leopoldina.

In his long life of approximately 70 years, Paullini wrote 68 books, of which several editions were printed.

Paullini died in 1712 in his hometown.

== Works ==
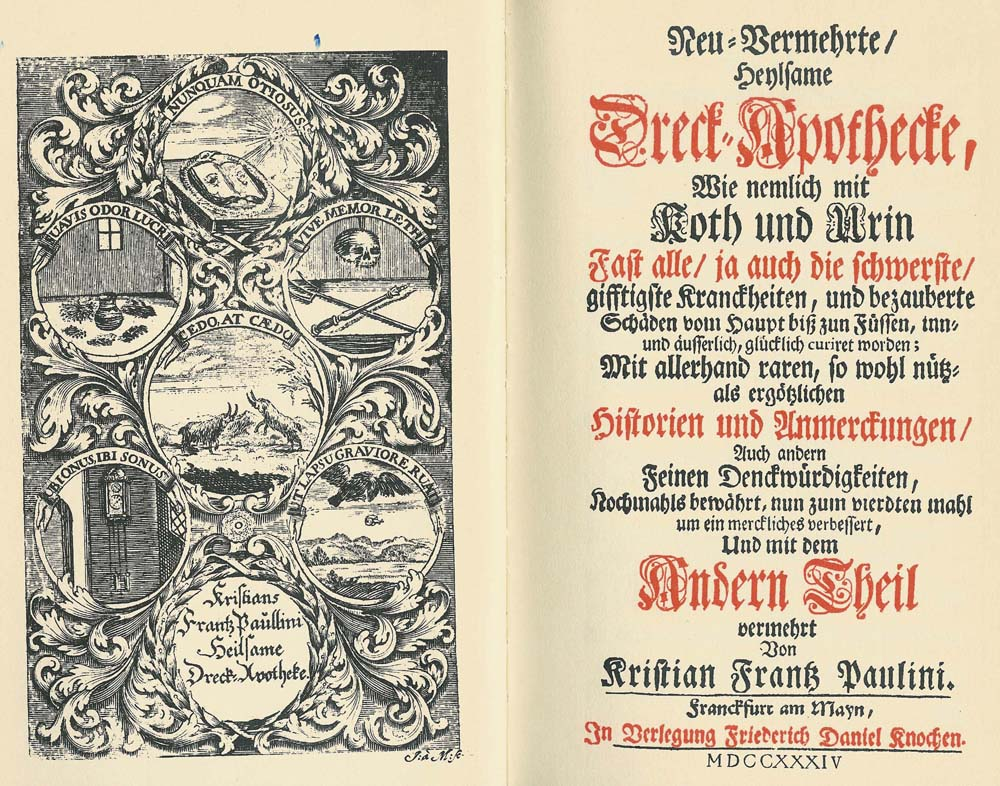
Dreck-Apotheke

Paullini made extensive reference and resorted to both ancient and contemporary medical authorities and to folk medicine (sailors, farmers, common people). His works reflected a deep learning based on the four temperaments theory and the outcome of a lengthy process of compiling the data obtained from his observation.

Amongst his essential works, there is a textbook on how to use human and animal excrement to cure internal or external diseases (Heilsame Dreck-Apotheke: wie nemlich mit Koth und Urin die meisten Krankheiten und Schäden glucklich geheilet worden), such as fecal bacteriotherapy.

He wrote a treatise (Flagellum salutis) on the advantage of the whip for curative purposes in various disorders and a handbook on the toad's therapeutic properties (Bufo juxta methodum et leges illustris Academiae Naturae curiosorum breviter descriptus).

As a botanist, he gave his name to Paullinia cupana known as guarana, a climbing plant native to the Amazon basin and especially common in Brazil. As a zoologist, he described the kraken in 1706 after Francesco Negri in Animalia fabulosa.

His commitment to promoting religious freedom was far ahead of his time.

In the same way, Christian Franz Paullini bolstered support for women's education by publishing his works in favor of learned German ladies in 1705 and in 1712. He even alphabetically listed all the learned German women known to him in his book.

His poor reputation came 130 years after his death from false historiographies: Rerum et antiquitatum Germanicarum Syntagma, Chronicon Mindense, Chronicon Hüxariense, Carmen de Brunsburgo and Annales Corbeienses.

== Bibliography ==
- "Cynographia Curiosa Seu Canis Descriptio". WDB – Wolfenbütteler Digitale Bibliothek. 1685.
- Discursus hist. pol. de advocatis et oeconomis monasticis: innexis aliquot diplomatibus et literis vere authenticis. Gollner. 1686. p. 31.
- Bufo juxta methodum & leges illustris Academiae Naturalis Curiosorum breviter descriptus, multisque naturae & artis observationibus, aliisque utilibus curiositatibus, studiosè refertus, à Christiano Francisco Paullini, . (in Latin). impensis Johannis Zigeri, bibliopolae. Typis Christiani Sigismumdi Frobergii. 1686. p. 120.
- Sacra herba, seu nobilis salvia, juxta methodum et leges illustris academiae naturae curiosorum descripta, selectisque remediis, et propriis observationibus conspersa. Augustae Vindelicorum (Augsburg): Laurentii Kronigeri & Theoph. Goebelii. Haeredum Typis Cafpari Brechenmacheri. 1688. p. 414. on the properties of Sage.
- Coenarum Helena, seu Angvilla 1689 by the University and State Library Düsseldorf
- Flagellum salutis: Das ist: Curieuse Erzählung, Wie mit Schlägen Allerhand schwere Kranckheiten ... curiret werden ... Knochen. 1698.
- Rerum et antiquitatum Germanicarum syntagma: varios annales, chronica et dissertationes comprendens ... Knoch. 1698. p. 1033.
- Henricus Graunius; Christian Knauthen (1699). Gaeographia curiosa, seu de pagis antiquae praesertim Germaniae commentarius. Impensis Friderici Knochii.
- Philosophischer Feyerabend: in sich haltende allerhand anmuthige, seltene, curieuse, so nütz als ergetzliche, auch zu allerlei nachtrücklichen Discursen anlassgebende Realien und merckwürdige Begebenheiten, in Leyd und Freud, zumlustigen end erbaulichen Zeitvertreib wohlmeinend mitgetheilet. In Verlegung Fridrich Knochens. 1700. p. 892.
- De Theriaca Coelesti Reformata Liber Singularis: Secundùm Leges & Methodum Imperialis Academiae Leopoldinae Nat. Curiosor. scriptus, Multisque observationibus rarioribus Physico-Medicis illustratus & confirmatus. Knochius. 1701. p. 347.
- "De Candore Liber Singularis, Varijs Antiquitatibus, memorabilibus & curiositatibus illustratus". WDB – Wolfenbütteler Digitale Bibliothek. 1703.
- Paullini, Christian Franz (1704). Nucis moschatae curiosa descriptio.
- Paullini, Christian Franz (1707). Philosophische Lust-Stunden.
- "Die heylsame Dreck-Apotheke" 1714 (remastered) by the University and State Library Düsseldorf
