= The Hero System Bestiary =

Fantasy role-playing game supplement

Original 1986 edition, cover art by James Waltrop

The Hero System Bestiary is a supplement published by Hero Games in 1986 to provide a variety of creatures for superhero, espionage and fantasy role-playing games that use the Hero System rules. As new editions of the Hero System rules were published, new editions of the Bestiary were also published.

== Contents ==
The Hero System Bestiary describes creatures for Hero System games, and includes a special section describing how the creatures can be used with each genre in the system.

== Publication history ==
In 1981, Hero Games published the superhero role-playing game (RPG) Champions that used the "Hero System" set of rules. Hero Games subsequently published a number of role-playing games in other genres that used the same Hero System rules, including the pulp-inspired Justice Inc. (1984), espionage RPG Danger International (1985), and fantasy RPG Fantasy Hero (1986). To provide opponents for the heroes, Hero Games and Iron Crown Enterprises (I.C.E.) published The Hero System Bestiary in 1986, a collection of animals and creatures that could be used with any of the Hero Games RPGs that used the 3rd edition of the Hero System rules. The 56-page softcover book was designed by Michael Susko, Jr., with artwork by James Holloway, Stephan Peregrine, and Jason Waltrip.

In 1992, I.C.E., which had taken over Hero Games, published a revised and greatly expanded edition of the Bestiary for the 4th edition of the Hero System rules, a 192-page softcover book designed by Doug Tabb, with contributions by Darrin Zielinski, Brian Nystul, and Mark Bennet, interior art by Storn Cook, Stephan Peregrine, Mitch Byrd, Jennell Jaquays (Note: Credited as Paul Jaquays.), Liz Danforth, Albert Deschesne, Denis Loubet, Luther, Elissa Martin, Darrell Midgette, Giorgia Ponticelli, Roger Raupp, Paulo Romano, Shawn Sharp, and Jason Waltrip, and cover art by Storn Cook.

Following the demise of I.C.E., Hero Games was resurrected by DOJ Inc. in 2001, and a new version of the Hero System Bestiary was published for the 5th edition of the Hero System Rules in 2002. This 239-page softcover book was designed by Stephen Long, with artwork by Peter Bergting, Mitch Byrd, Andrew Cremeans, Keith Curtis, Eric Rademaker, Greg Smith, and Jonathan Wyke.

A greatly expanded version was published by Hero Games/DOJ Inc. in 2010 for the 6th edition of the Hero System Rules, a 498-page softcover book designed by Steven Long, Michael Surbrook, and Darren Watts.

== Reception ==
In the Spring 1987 edition of Abyss, Dave Nalle noted, "This Bestiary should be quite useful to Hero System players, and while none of it will be new to players of other systems, some of the basic ideas on creature use and design could be of great help to a GM in any game who wanted to be sure his original monsters had some logic to them."

In the August–September 1987 edition of Space Gamer/Fantasy Gamer (No. 79), Frank Jesse liked the wide range of creatures portrayed in the original edition of The Hero System Bestiary, saying "The Bestiary is more than a monster manual. Any Game master worth their weight in dice, should feel the tingling of ideas. And this will most likely turn to impatience as the Game master waits to spring these surprises on those unsuspecting adventurers."

Sean Holland reviewed Hero Bestiary in White Wolf #36 (1993), rating it a 3 out of 5 and stated that "The Hero Bestiary is a good sourcebook. I would highly recommend it for a Fantasy Hero GM, and GMs of other Hero System games should give it a look as well; the dinosaurs are great for Champions."

In the September 1993 edition of Dragon (Issue 197), Allen Varney was grateful that Hero Games had "at last released an expanded and updated Hero Bestiary [for the 4th edition of the Hero System]," but noted that many of the creatures were fairly ordinary, saying, "this thick volume devotes unusual amounts of space to mundane beasts as well as fantasy monsters, so let’s hope most Fantasy Hero campaigns need not only dragons but also, say, ostriches."

== Reviews ==
- Comics Feature #56
