= Trebia gens =

Ancient Roman family

The gens Trebia was a minor plebeian family at ancient Rome. Members of this gens are first mentioned during the second century BC, but none of them attained any of the higher offices of the Roman state under the Republic. Three of the Trebii reached the consulship in the time of Hadrian.

== Origin ==
The nomen Trebius was originally a common Sabellic praenomen, which came to be used as a nomen gentilicium.

== Members ==
- Trebius Niger, a companion of the proconsul Lucius Licinius Lucullus in Hispania Baetica in 150 BC. His writings on natural history are noted by Pliny on several occasions.
- Marcus Trebius Gallus, a legate sent by Publius Licinius Crassus, Caesar's lieutenant in Gaul, to obtain grain from the Curiosolitae, a Gallic tribe. As with his fellow envoys to other tribes, Trebius was seized by his hosts, who hoped to bargain for the return of their hostages from the Romans.
- Lucius Trebius Germanus, consul suffectus at the end of an uncertain year between AD 123 and 126.
- Gaius Trebius Maximus, consul suffectus at the end of AD 122, and governor of Lycia and Pamphylia early in the reign of Hadrian.
- Trebius Sergianus, consul ordinarius in AD 132, during the reign of Hadrian. He was the recipient of a rescript from the emperor, upon which Ulpian wrote, concerning the giving of security against the recovery of an estate during a challenge to a will.

== See also ==
- List of Roman gentes

== Bibliography ==
- Gaius Julius Caesar, Commentarii de Bello Gallico (Commentaries on the Gallic War).
- Gaius Plinius Secundus (Pliny the Elder), Historia Naturalis (Natural History).
- Digesta, or Pandectae (The Digest).
- Dictionary of Greek and Roman Biography and Mythology, William Smith, ed., Little, Brown and Company, Boston (1849).
- George Davis Chase, "The Origin of Roman Praenomina", in Harvard Studies in Classical Philology, vol. VIII, pp. 103–184 (1897).
- Paul von Rohden, Elimar Klebs, & Hermann Dessau, Prosopographia Imperii Romani (The Prosopography of the Roman Empire, abbreviated PIR), Berlin (1898).
- T. Robert S. Broughton, The Magistrates of the Roman Republic, American Philological Association (1952–1986).
- Alison E. Cooley, The Cambridge Manual of Latin Epigraphy, Cambridge University Press (2012).
