= Fantasy Hero Companion =

1990 fantasy role-playing game supplement

- Cover art by Larry Elmore, 1990
- Author: Rob Bell (editor)
- Genre: Role-playing games
- Publisher: Hero Games/Iron Crown Enterprises
- Publication date: 1990
- Media type: book
- Pages: 142

Fantasy Hero Companion is a supplement published by Hero Games / Iron Crown Enterprises (I.C.E.) in 1990 for the fantasy role-playing game Fantasy Hero.

== Contents ==
Fantasy Hero Companion is a supplement for Fantasy Hero presenting mass combat rules, 12 sample adventure locations, many new monsters, additional new magic items, and 13 colleges of spells. The 142-page product outlined combat rules, unit reference material, locations with maps, a bestiary, and information on spells and magic items.

== Publication history ==
In 1981, Hero Games published the superhero role-playing game (RPG) Champions that used a new form of rules. In 1985, using the same "Hero System" of rules, they produced Fantasy Hero, a fantasy role-playing game. Hero Games then ran into financial difficulty, and was eventually taken over as a subsidiary of I.C.E. In 1990, Hero Games/I.C.E. published a Fantasy Hero Companion, a supplement to Fantasy Hero that used the latest update of the Hero System rules set. The 144-page softcover book was edited by Rob Bell, with a cover by Larry Elmore.

Shannon Appelcline noted that when Iron Crown Enterprises began publishing Hero System genre books, that "ICE never supported these individual genres — as Hero had rarely supported anything but Champions — with the only exceptions being Fantasy Hero Companion (1990) and Fantasy Hero Companion II (1992). However, they did begin publishing sourcebooks for the Hero System as a whole, which could be used with all genres."

== Reception ==
Sean Holland reviewed the manual in the February–March 1991 issue of White Wolf. He advised its utility was greater for those running a Fantasy Hero campaign versus playing in one, noting that "it's a good book, and if you need a map, an interesting magic item or unique spell, you might want to take a peek at it too". He rated it overall at a 3 out of 5 possible points.

== Reviews ==
- Papyrus Issue 6 (1992, p. 6)
- Adventurers Club Issue 16 (Summer 1990, p. 4)
