= Hero System Bestiary =

Hero System Bestiary cover

Hero System Bestiary is a compilation of creatures designed for use with Hero System role-playing game rules. It is presented in the form of a bestiary and was published in 2002 for the 5th edition of the Hero System. The cover is made of thick paper and illustrated in color, while the interior consists of 239 pages illustrated in black and white. An earlier edition of The Hero System Bestiary was published in 1992 for the prior edition of the Hero System.

This work is divided into four chapters and an appendix. The first chapter gives an overview of creatures in a role-playing game, along with descriptions of the game system statistics and how creatures are created using the Hero System's point build method. Each of the skills common to animals is described in terms of its application to the various life forms. The application of powers and their limitations is detailed specifically for creatures such as animals, and the various disadvantages are explained in terms of their best application.

New with this release is a section in chapter one on Creature Templates. These are sets of powers with appropriate advantages and limitations that can be applied to modify a creature. Therefore, there are templates for size modification, elemental forms, undead, venomous creatures, disease carriers, mutations, and so forth. These templates significantly multiply the variety of creatures available to the game master.

The first chapter also has a section on how creatures fight and behave in combat, along with custom hit location tables for common creature forms that differ from humanoid shapes. The chapter closes with some comments on animal populations and the commercial value of various animal parts.

The remaining three chapters consist of creature statistics and descriptions for fantastic beasts, animals, and beasts of science fiction and the films. Each creature description is about a page in length, and contains a complete listing of the characteristics, powers, skills, and disadvantages, including the point cost for each. This is followed by brief descriptions of the creature's ecology, personality and motivation, powers and combat tactics, their appearance, and the uses of the creature in a role-playing game campaign. The creatures listed include a number that are as intelligent as man (or more so), and can possess their own intricate cultures. All of the creatures are illustrated in black and white.

The book closes with a bibliography and an appendix. The latter includes various sample template-modified creatures, an extensive list of hit location tables, area of effect maps for various powers, and a creature summary table. At the end is an index.

Altogether the book includes complete statistics for the following creatures:

- Fantastic Beasts — guardian ape, basilisk, giant vampire bat, centaur, chimera (mythology), cockatrice, giant crab, deadly ooze, various demons and devils, dragons, elementals, giant frog, gargoyle, golems, gorgon, griffin, harpy, hippocampus, hippogriff, homunculus, hydra, giant insects, jackalope, kraken, giant lizard, lycanthropes, manticore, minotaur, pegasus, Phoenix, rakshasa, giant rat, roc, salamander, satyr, sea serpent, simurgh, siren, fantastic snakes, sphinx, tree man, undead (ghost, ghoul, mummy, animated skeleton, vampire, and zombie), unicorn, giant wolf, and giant worm.
- Mundane Beasts — barracuda, bat, bears, birds of prey, other birds, boar, buffalo, camel, domestic cat, great cats (cheetah, leopard, lion, smilodon, and tiger), chimpanzee, giant clam, crocodile, deer, dinosaurs, dogs, dolphin, eel, elephant, gorilla, hippopotamus, horses, small mammals, rhinoceros, scorpion, sharks, snakes, spiders, animal swarms, swordfish, whales, and wolves.
- Beasts of Science Fiction and the Movies — amorphous horror, animal-men, giant ape, chromedog, engine of destruction, giant carnivorous plants, giant dinosaur, giant space amoeba, living brain, mon'da hunting lizard, neuroparasite, psychovore, robots and androids, slasher, swamp creature, and xenovore creatures.

== Reviews ==
- Pyramid
- Digital Hero #2 (July 2002)
