= Bacteriotherapy =

Treatment of illness using bacteria

Bacteriotherapy is the purposeful use of bacteria or their products in treating an illness. Forms of bacteriotherapy include the use of probiotics, microorganisms that provide health benefits when consumed; fecal matter transplants (FMT)/intestinal microbiota transplant (IMT), the transfer of gut microorganisms from the fecal matter of healthy donors to recipient patients to restore microbiota; or synbiotics which combine prebiotics, indigestible ingredients that promote growth of beneficial microorganisms, and probiotics. Through these methods, the gut microbiota, the community of 300-500 microorganism species that live in the digestive tract of animals aiding in digestion, energy storage, immune function and protection against pathogens, can be recolonized with favorable bacteria, which in turn has therapeutic effects.

Fecal Matter Transplant is being used as a preventative treatment for C. difficile infections, a gastrointestinal disease in which Clostridioides difficile colonizes the gut of an organism disrupting microbial balance and causing diarrhea that can potentially be deadly. Bacteriotherapy has also begun to be used in the treatment of mental disorders such as depression, anxiety, and autism spectrum disorder. Recolonization of gut flora can be used effectively in the treatment of mental disorders because of the existence of the gut-brain axis, the bidirectional route of communication between the brain and the gut, specifically the gut microbiota.

== Fecal matter transplant (FMT) ==
Fecal matter transplant was first documented in humans in 1958. The FDA considers fecal matter transplant a suitable treatment for select patients with C. difficile, specifically when standard treatment has failed. It shows a 90% success rate in clinical trials for recurrent C. difficile infections. For other illness, it is considered an experimental treatment and should only be done within a research program.

The process of fecal matter transplant involves injecting a liquid suspension of healthy stool into the gastrointestinal tract of a patient. Fecal matter transplant does not require immunological matching or suppression (unlike typical organ transplants). Fecal matter transplant can be performed through nasogastric intubation, nasojejunal intubation, nasoduodenal intubation, upper tract endoscopy, retention enema, gentle rectal enema, or colonoscopy. Research is being done to see if fecal matter transplant can be encapsulated and taken orally as a pill.

Fecal matter transplant is a novel treatment, with few complications known thus far. Minor side effects have been reported as mild diarrhea, cramping, abdominal pain, changes in bowel movements, upper gastrointestinal hemorrhage, IBS symptoms (infectious or not), constipation, and irritable colon. There is little known about the possible long-term risk of transmitting an autoimmune disease. Protocols vary with regard to quantity of stool being transplanted and method of infusion.

Fresh unfrozen stool samples are more commonly used than frozen samples. The transplant of unfrozen sample is preferably completed within 6 hours. Resolution and relapse rates also differ based on the diluents used to make fecal matter transplant solutions (water, saline, yogurt, milk or saline with psyllium). Resolution rates increased with increased volume and relapse rates increased with decreased mass of fecal matter transplant.

Further research on fecal matter transplant is required to directly compare routes of administration, optimal protocol for infusions, and ideal amounts of fecal matter required. Researchers suggest using a large sample size in order to yield statistically significant results.

=== Fecal matter transplant donation ===
Donors must have refrained from antibiotic usage for as little as two months or up to six months prior to donating stool. Additionally, donors must not have any history of gastrointestinal disease. Blood tests are used to screen donors for hepatitis A, B and C, HIV, and syphilis. Stool tests may include CD toxin, ova, and parasites. One donor provides feces for more than one patient. Fresh donations should be provided on the day of treatment. Donors related to recipients typically show higher resolution rates (93%) compared to unrelated donors (84%).

=== Medical uses ===
==== C. difficile ====
C. difficile infections typically result from the use of broad spectrum antibiotics that alter the microbiota balance, allowing C. difficile to colonize. Typical treatment of C. difficile with antibiotics, can further disrupt the microbiome of the gut often leading to a cyclical recurrence of C. difficile with 35% of patients experiencing recurrence, additionally antibiotic resistance is a growing problem.

Replacing typical antibiotic treatments with novel fecal matter transplant treatment restores healthy microbiota and resolves symptoms. Fecal matter transplant restores a healthy balance of bacteria within a gut previously disrupted by C. difficile colonization and antibiotic usage. Fecal matter transplant colonizes the gut with microbiota that suppress C. difficile, rebuilds a stable microbiome, and restores function. The microbiota of treated patients typically resembles that of the donor after transplantation.

In a systematic review of the use of fecal matter transplant to treat C. difficile infections (mostly C. difficile associated diarrhea), 536 patients age 4-77 were reviewed, with elderly patients predominating. Most patients had previously received antibiotics before having repeated relapses. 87% of patient's diarrhea resolved after first fecal matter transplant treatment. Diarrhea resolution rates differed based on injection: 81% resolution when injected in the stomach, 86% when injected into the duodenum/jejunum (the first two parts of the small intestine), 93% success upon transfer by colonoscopy into the cecum (pouch at the junction of the small and large intestine)/ascending colon, 84% when inserted into the distal colon. Upon resolution of diarrhea, C. difficile toxin tests were found negative.

Another systematic review of 317 patients age 2-95, (average of 53 years) showed resolution of C. difficile 92% of the time after treatment by fecal matter transplant. Stool transplants were typically greater than or equal to 200 mL. 89% showed resolution after 1 treatment. Infusion by gastroscopic/nasojejunal tube showed the lowest resolution rates at 76%.

Fecal microbiota, live (Rebyota) was approved for medical use in the United States in November 2022.

Fecal microbiota spores, live (Vowst) was approved for medical use in the United States in April 2023. It is the first fecal microbiota product that is taken by mouth.

===== Administration methods for C. difficile =====
Administration via colonoscopy showed highest rates of successful clearance of C. difficile associated diarrhea, indicating that the direct deliverance of healthy bacteria to the site where the majority of C. difficile is established is the most successful therapeutic avenue. Additional benefits of colonoscopy are recolonization with favorable bacteria, bowel cleaning to rid residual C. difficile spores, injection of a larger volume of stool sample than other methods and it allows visualization of the colon to rule out other disease.

Upper endoscopy and nasogastric tubes are commonly used to avoid performing an endoscopy through an inflamed colon where there is a small risk of perforation. Additionally, endoscopy is a slow procedure; however, the disadvantages of the upper endoscopy and nasogastric tube methods are that the sample cannot be inserted directly into the C. difficile affected site in the colon and the sample may be degraded before reaching the colon—accounting for its lower resolution rate. Enema is a less expensive and less invasive option.

Administration routes are typically decided on a case-by-case basis and account for some differences in resolution and relapse rates.

==== Depression and anxiety ====
There are high levels of comorbidity between some mental disorders and gastrointestinal disturbances. This provides support for the existence gut-brain-axis, in which microbiota of the gut can influence brain development, function, and behavior, and emphasizes its role in mental illness, making fecal matter transplant a plausible therapeutic avenue for some mental illness.

Microbiota modulate the hypothalamic-pituitary-adrenal-axis (HPA axis), which controls reactions to stress and regulates digestion, immune system, mood, and emotions. Additionally, microbiota can directly impact the central nervous system (CNS), as studies have shown that bacteria in the gut can activate stress response through the vagus nerve, a cranial nerve responsible for interactions with the digestive tract. Evidence suggests that while stress can impact the composition of the microbiome, the microbiome also has an impact on stress response and behavior.

Research on fecal matter transplant has shown that upon transfer of fecal matter from a donor to a germ-free recipient, animals that have no microorganisms living in them, the recipient begins to mimic the phenotype, observable characteristics, of the donor. In experiments with mice, an obese donor led the recipient mouse to adopt an obese phenotype, while an underweight donor led to the adoption of an underweight phenotype in the recipient.

The microbiome of depressed people has been found to show decreased richness and diversity. Specifically, lactobacillus and bifidobacterial have been identified as having roles in modulating depression and anxiety behaviors. When fecal matter is transferred from depressed mice to microbiota depleted mice, behavioral exams show anhedonia, a symptom of depression; studies have also found that in a microbiome transfer from a stressed animal to a control, the control recipient also exhibits anxious behaviors proving that some depression and anxiety phenotypes are dependent on the gut microbiome, and therefore transferable.

==== Autism ====
The gut microbiome has been implicated in autism spectrum disorder (ASD) due to its high comorbidity with gastrointestinal problems correlating with severity of ASD. Mouse models of ASD show a link between abnormal metabolites in the gut and behavior. A clinical trial of 18 ASD children undergoing 2-week antibiotic treatment, bowel cleanse, followed by extended fecal matter transplant showed an 80% reduction of gastrointestinal symptoms. Behavioral ASD symptoms also showed significant improvement that persisted up to 8 weeks after treatment ended. These changes are attributed to colonization of donor microbiota and beneficial changes in the gut environment.

=== Probiotics ===
Probiotics are living bacteria or fungi that confer health benefits. They have 3 mechanisms of therapeutic effect: antimicrobial effects, strengthening lining of the intestines, and immune modulation. These mechanisms help alter and diversify gut flora to benefit overall health. The antimicrobial effect helps prevent the growth of bacteria that cause illness. Probiotics also help strengthen tight junctions, multiprotein complexes lining the intestines (as well as other organs and regions of the body) to prevent passage of materials.

==== Medical uses ====
===== Gastrointestinal disorders =====
Probiotics have been used in treatment or prevention of C. difficile, irritable bowel disease, irritable bowel syndrome, prevention of radiation or chemotherapy induced sequelae, necrotizing enterocolitis, hepatic encephalopathy, and atopic dermatitis. Success in treatment depends on whether single or mixed strains are administered, dose, and specific bacterial species. Lactobacillus and Bifidobacterium are the most commonly used probiotic strains.

===== Autism =====
Use of probiotics in psychological states and autism is being studied and has shown that probiotics may influence psychological states. Probiotics have been used to transfer neurochemicals such as GABA. There is evidence that disruption of the microbiome may promote overproduction of Clostridium tetani, a neurotoxin producing bacteria that may contribute to symptoms of autism. One case study on a 12-year-old boy with ASD, severe cognitive disability, and celiac disease who received probiotic treatment for celiac showed an unexpected improvement in autistic core symptoms that persisted 4 months after treatment. Administration of an Autism Diagnostic Observation Schedule (ADOS) showed a 3-point decrease in score (i.e. an improvement in core autistic symptoms) in the social affect domain. ADOS scores are typically consistent measures of autism severity, and change is unlikely. Microbiota reports consistently show significant differences in the gut of autistic patients compared to non-autistic.

In studies with mice, probiotic treatment reduced anxiety and depressive behaviors, reversed the impact of maternal separation on depressive behaviors, reversed inflammatory induced and parasite induced anxiety behaviors. This evidence suggests that probiotic treatment has antidepressant and anxiolytic effects.

=== Synbiotics ===
Synbiotics contain both prebiotics and probiotics. Combining prebiotics with probiotics improves survival and activity of probiotic bacterial species. In synbiotics, prebiotics and probiotics work synergistically to provide a combined benefit beyond what either could confer independently. Synbiotics have shown positive effects on obesity, diabetes, non-alcoholic fatty liver disease, necrotizing enterocolitis in very low birth weight infants, and hepatic encephalopathy. Synbiotics can be used both as preventative measures and therapeutic treatments.
