= Fantasy Hero =

Tabletop role-playing game

- Cover of the 5th edition
- Designers: Steven S. Long
- Publishers: Hero Games
- Publication: 1985 (3rd edition); 1990 (4th edition); 2003 (5th edition); 2009 (6th edition)
- Genres: Fantasy fiction
- Systems: Hero System

Fantasy Hero is a role-playing game book originally published by Hero Games in 1985 that allows gamemasters to plan and present fantasy role-playing games using the Hero System rules. Several revised editions of the book have subsequently been published.

== Description ==
Fantasy Hero uses the rules of the Hero System for character creation and combat, adapted for the fantasy genre by adding rules for magic items, spells, and fantastical creatures. The first edition published in 1985, also includes two short sample adventures, as well as rules for converting other role-playing games to Fantasy Hero.

=== Magic ===
The first two editions of Fantasy Hero ("3rd" and "4th" edition) include a series of theme-oriented magical colleges, and a specific mechanical basis for spellcasting. In the 5th edition supplement the concept of colleges is removed, replaced by twelve different magic systems.

=== Scenarios ===
Three scenarios were included to give the players an idea of what an adventure involves. The first is a solo boar hunt, the second involves a local inn, and in the third, the player characters must choose to help one of two warring wizards.

== Publication history ==
Hero Games originally published the superhero role-playing game Champions in 1981, using a set of rules for character creation, skills and combat that came to be known as the Hero System. This system was further refined in a second edition of Champions (1982) and again in a third edition (1985). In 1985, Hero Games released Fantasy Hero, a 160-page softcover book designed by Steve Peterson, and illustrated by Brian Hamilton, Denis Loubet, Patricia Moriarity, Scott Ruggels, Carolyn Schultz-Savoy, and Patrick Zircher, that included the Hero System without the superhero rules, but with relevant fantasy rules. As other editions were published, this edition became known as Fantasy Hero 3rd edition, since it used the 3rd edition of the Hero System rules.

About this time, Hero Games ran into financial difficulties and was taken over, becoming a subsidiary of Iron Crown Enterprises (I.C.E.). In 1990, I.C.E./Hero Games released the 4th edition of the Hero System as a stand-alone generic rules system, without the Champion superhero rules. They also published a new edition of Fantasy Hero, a 256-page softcover book that did not contain the basic Hero System rules, only the fantasy rules; this required players to have the 4th edition Hero System book in order to play Hero Fantasy games.

In 2003 Steven S. Long designed a new edition of Fantasy Hero for the 5th edition of Hero System, a 416-page softcover book.

In 2009, a new edition of Fantasy Hero, a 480-page hardcover book, was published to be paired with the new 6th Edition Hero System.

== Reception ==
Phil Masters reviewed the original edition of Fantasy Hero for White Dwarf #76, giving it an overall rating of 9 out of 10, but warned that "This is not a game for the lazy. [...] Nonetheless, for those who want flexibility, high colour and playability, it's probably the best thing on the market."

In Issue 39 of Abyss, M.J. Ventane wrote, "Despite [some] mechanical gripes and nit picks, Fantasy Hero is basically a pretty playable system. It is intelligently designed, flexible and easy to learn." However, Ventane thought the game's biggest problem was "the flavor of the game, which seems to be rather bland."

In Issue 9 of The Games Machine, John Woods reviewed the original edition and liked the character creation system, calling the non-random point-buy system "one of the most appealing parts of the system." He concluded, "This is little-known system certainly deserves more players. The rules are very clearly written and attractively presented, and the game offers wonderful opportunities for referees who are prepared either to develop their own background material or to spend a little time customising adventures intended for other systems. Well worth tracking down!"

In Issue 42 of Different Worlds, Russell Grant Collins liked the universality of the Hero System, noting that "knowing how to play one of these games [by Hero Games] makes it easy to learn any of the others." Collins also liked the character generation system, calling it "one of the best things about the Hero System." He did note a few issues with the combat system, since it had originally been designed for Champions, a superhero game, and the player characters in this game are slower and less powerful. However, Collins still felt this game was "quite fun. I recommend it to anyone who plays other games from Hero as a primer on how to introduce magic to those systems, as well as various mythological creatures. And I recommend it to anyone wanting a fantasy system where the characters are only limited by the players' imagination (and the game master)."

In his 1990 book The Complete Guide to Role-Playing Games, game critic Rick Swan thought the ability to design one's own magic spells was "versatile, but it's time-consuming and awkward." Swan also didn't like that a campaign world or setting had not been included, calling the generic result "pretty dull." Swan concluded by giving the game a below-average rating of 2 out of 4, saying, "As a standalone game, it's for completists only."

Sean Holland reviewed Fantasy Hero in White Wolf #25 (Feb./March, 1991), rating it a 4 out of 5 and stated that "Overall, I highly recommend Fantasy Hero for those who like the Hero System, and if you are planning to start a new fantasy campaign and have not decided on what system to use, give Fantasy Hero a look."

== Awards ==
At the 2004 ENnie Awards, the 5th Edition of Fantasy Hero won gold for "Best Non-d20 Supplement".

== Other reviews and commentary ==
- Pyramid
- Backstab #46

== Publications ==
The following publications have been released to support Fantasy Hero:

- Fantasy Hero 1st ed. (1985)
- Magic Items: a Magical Supplement (Berge et al. 1987) – magic items
- The Spell Book (Allston & Nystul 1989) – magic spells
- Fantasy Hero 2nd ed. (1990)
- Fantasy Hero Companion (1990) – includes mass combat rules
- Fantasy Hero Companion II (1992) – includes detailed naval rules
- Broken Kingdoms (2001) – a game setting

Publications since 2003 support the new 5th edition Hero System rules:

- Fantasy Hero (2003, 416 pages)
- Fantasy Hero Battlegrounds (2004, 128 pages)
- Fantasy Hero Grimoire (2003, 270 pages)
- Fantasy Hero Grimoire II: The Book of Lost Magic (2004, 144 pages)
- Monsters, Minions, and Marauders (2003, 128 pages)
- The Turakian Age (2004, 319 pages) – a high fantasy setting
- The Valdorian Age (2005, 199 pages) – a swords & sorcery setting
- Asian Bestiary, Vol. I (2006, 144 pages)
- Asian Bestiary, Vol. II (2006, 144 pages)
- Nobles, Knights, and Necromancers (2006, 176 pages)
- Tuala Morn (2007, 300 pages) – a pseudo-Celtic fantasy setting
- Enchanted Items (2007, 240 pages)
- The Atlantean Age (2008) – a high fantasy setting
- Urban Fantasy Hero (2009)
- The Book of Dragons (2009)

In addition, these Hero game system publications could be used to support a Fantasy Hero campaign:

- Hero System Almanac 1 (1993)
- Hero System Almanac 2 (1995)
- Hero Bestiary (2nd edition, 1992) – a general Hero bestiary that includes fantasy genre creatures.
- Hero System Bestiary (2002, 239 pages)
- Hero System Combat Handbook (2005, 160 pages)
- Hero System Equipment Guide (2005, 206 pages)
- Horror Hero (1994)
- Ninja Hero (1st edition, 1990)
- Ninja Hero (2nd edition, 2004, 160 pages)
- The Ultimate Martial Artist (1st edition, 1994)
- The Ultimate Martial Artist (2nd edition, 2002, 192 pages)
- The Ultimate Mentalist (1st edition, 1995)
- The Ultimate Mentalist (2nd edition, 2006, 290 pages)
- The Ultimate Metamorph (2005, 248 pages)
- The Ultimate Mystic (2005, 230 pages)
- The Ultimate Skill (2006, 400 pages)
- The Ultimate Speedster (2006, 292 pages)
- The Ultimate Supermage (1996)
- The Ultimate Vehicle (2003, 236 pages)
