= Henry Lee (naturalist) =

English naturalist (1826–1888)

Henry Lee (1826? – 31 October 1888) was an English naturalist, known as an aquarium director and author.

== Life ==
Born in 1826 or 1827, he succeeded John Keast Lord as naturalist of the Brighton Aquarium in 1872, and was for a time a director. At the aquarium he instituted experiments on the migration of smelts, the habits of the herring, whitebait, crayfish, and other topics.

Lee was himself an amateur collector of natural history specimens and microscopist. He was a Fellow of the Linnean Society, Geological Society, and Zoological Society, in London. He was President of the Quekett Microscopical Club from 1875 to 1877. He died, after some years of ill-health, at Renton House, Brixton, on 31 October 1888.

Lee was sceptical of the claims of cryptozoology and sea serpents. His book Sea Monsters Unmasked (1884) compared sightings of the Kraken to the squid.

== Works ==
Lee produced Aquarium Notes for visitors. He wrote:

- The Octopus, 1874, a popular account.
- The White Whale, 1878
- Sea Fables Explained and Sea Monsters Unmasked, two of the series of handbooks for the Fisheries Exhibition of 1883, about the kraken, sea-serpent, mermaids, barnacles, and similar topics.
- Vegetable Lamb of Tartary, 1887.

He was a contributor to Land and Water.
