= Synbiotic =

Nutritional supplements

A synbiotic is a food ingredient or dietary supplement combining probiotics and prebiotics in a form of synergism, hence synbiotic. Synbiotics may be complementary synbiotics, where each component is independently chosen for its potential effect on host health, or synergistic synbiotics, where the prebiotic component is chosen to support the activity of the chosen probiotic. Research is evaluating if synbiotics can be optimized, (known as 'optibiotics') which are purported to enhance the growth and health benefits of existing probiotics.

Probiotics are live bacteria which are intended to colonize the large intestine, although as of 2018, there is no evidence that adding dietary bacteria to healthy people has any added effect. A prebiotic is a food or dietary supplement product that may induce the growth or activity of beneficial microorganisms. A prebiotic may be a fiber, but a fiber is not necessarily a prebiotic.

Using prebiotics and probiotics in combination may be described as synbiotic, but the United Nations Food & Agriculture Organization recommends that the term "synbiotic" be used only if the net health benefit is synergistic. Synbiotic formulations in combination with pasteurized breast milk are under preliminary clinical research for their potential to ameliorate necrotizing enterocolitis in infants, although there was insufficient evidence to warrant recommending synbiotics for this use as of 2016.

== Definition ==
The synbiotic concept was first introduced as "mixtures of probiotics and prebiotics that beneficially affect the host by improving the survival and implantation of live microbial dietary supplements in the gastrointestinal tract, by selectively stimulating the growth and/or by activating the metabolism of one or a limited number of health-promoting bacteria, thus improving host welfare." In 2020, the definition was updated to "a mixture comprising live microorganisms and substrate(s) selectively utilised by host microorganisms that confer a health benefit on the host." The update was made to allow for more flexible combinations beyond traditional prebiotic + probiotic combinations, allowing a deeper understanding of how substrates and microbes interact in a host.

== Examples ==
- Bifidobacteria and Fructooligosaccharides (FOS)
- Bifidobacteria or lactobacilli with FOS or inulins or galactooligosaccharides (GOS)
- Lactobacillus rhamnosus GG and inulins
- Polyphenol
