= Karl August von Bergen =

German anatomist and botanist

Karl August von Bergen (11 August 1704 in Frankfurt (Oder) – 7 October 1759 in ibid.) was a German anatomist and botanist.

== Life ==
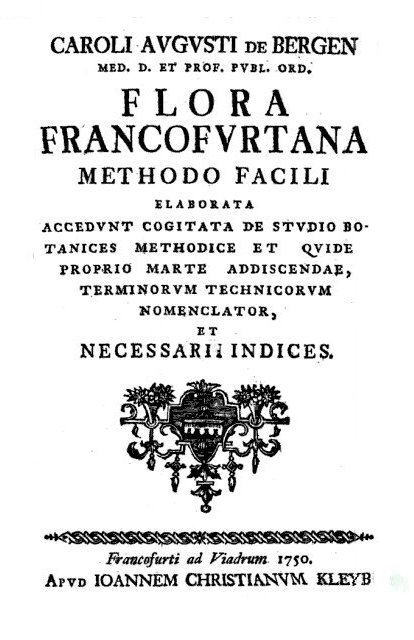
Title page of Flora Francofurtana, 1750

Karl August von Bergen was the son of anatomy professor Johann Georg von Bergen (died 1738).

He attended the Gymnasium in his home town of Frankfurt an der Oder and later studied medicine at the local Viadrina University from 1727. There, he was taught by his father and by the anatomist Andreas Ottomar Goelicke (1670–1744).

He continued his studies at the University of Leiden, where he studied under Professors Herman Boerhaave (1668–1738) and Bernhard Siegfried Albinus.

He also studied in Paris and Strasbourg. He returned to Viadrina University, received his doctorate in medicine in 1732, and took a post as a professor at the university.

After his father's death, he was awarded the chair of anatomy and botany at the university. His duties included the care of the Botanical Garden, which had been founded in 1678 by Johann Christoph Bekmann.

In 1732, he demonstrated the general distribution of cellular membranes in animals and showed that they not only enclose every part of the animal frame, but also form the basis of every organ. His work was adopted and further expanded in 1757 by his friend Albrecht von Haller.

On 2 April 1739, he married Susanna Elizabeth Rhode. They had four children. After Susanna's early death, he remarried her sister, Mary Elizabeth Rhode, on 29 September 1749.

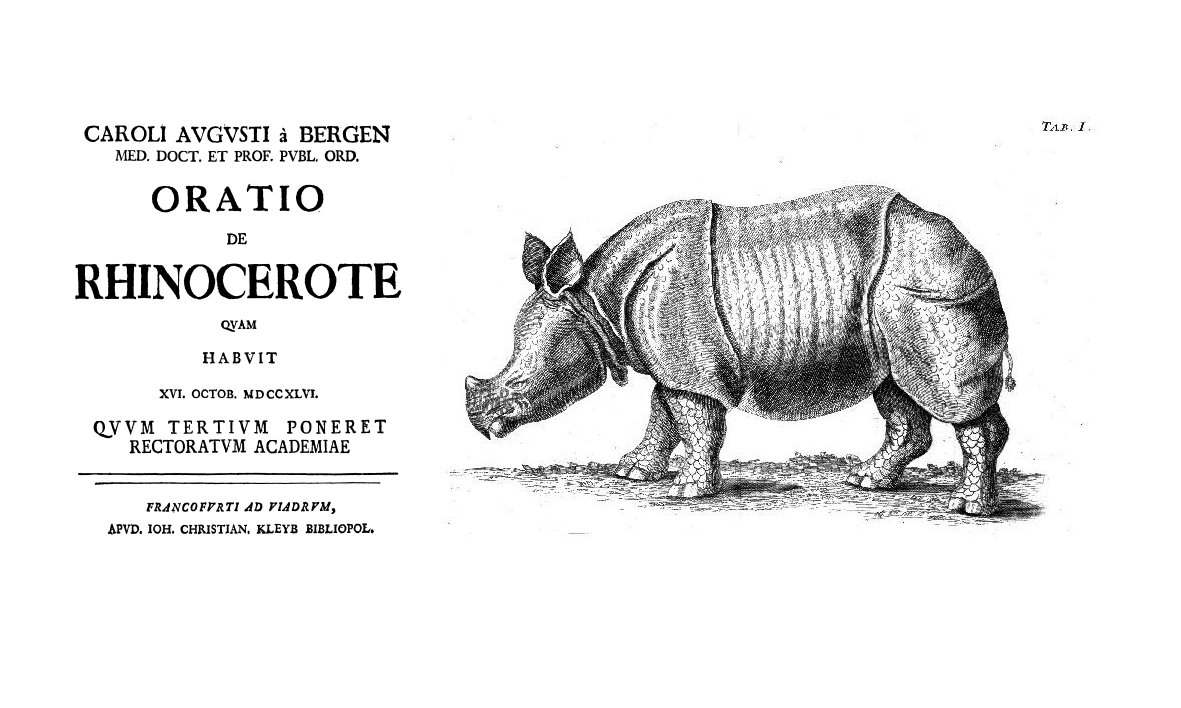
Front page and figure of Oratio de rhinocerote, 1746

His most noted work is Flora Francofurtana, published in Frankfurt (Oder) in 1750. Among his more unusual works is an essay on the rhinoceros: Oratio de rhinocerote, quam habuit cum tertium deponeret rectoratum, published in Frankfurt (Oder) in 1746.

The botanist Conrad Moench named the plant genus Bergenia in his honor in 1794.

== Bibliography ==
- Letters 1743 to 1752, The Linnaeus Society.
- Oratio de rhinocerote, quam habuit cum tertium deponeret rectoratum, Frankfurt (Oder), 1746
- Flora Francofurtana, Frankfurt (Oder), published in 1750
- Dissertatio Botanica De Aloide, published 1753
- Classes conchyliorum, Published 1760
