= Silonit =

In Jewish folklore, the Silonit is a creature brought forth from the sea by God during the Fourth Plague of Egypt, to remove the roofs of houses so that the Egyptians could not flee the wild animals attacking them. The Silonit is described in the Sefer haYashar as possessing arms or tentacles, which are ten cubits long, and possessing many of these arms, using these limbs, she removed the bolts and bars and opened the houses of the Egyptians, allowing the swarm of animals to get into their houses. In the Otzar Midrashim, Midrash Vayosha, the Silonit is simply described as opening the doors to allow the animals to eat the Egyptians.
