= Francesco Negri (travel writer) =

Catholic priest and scholar (1623–1698)

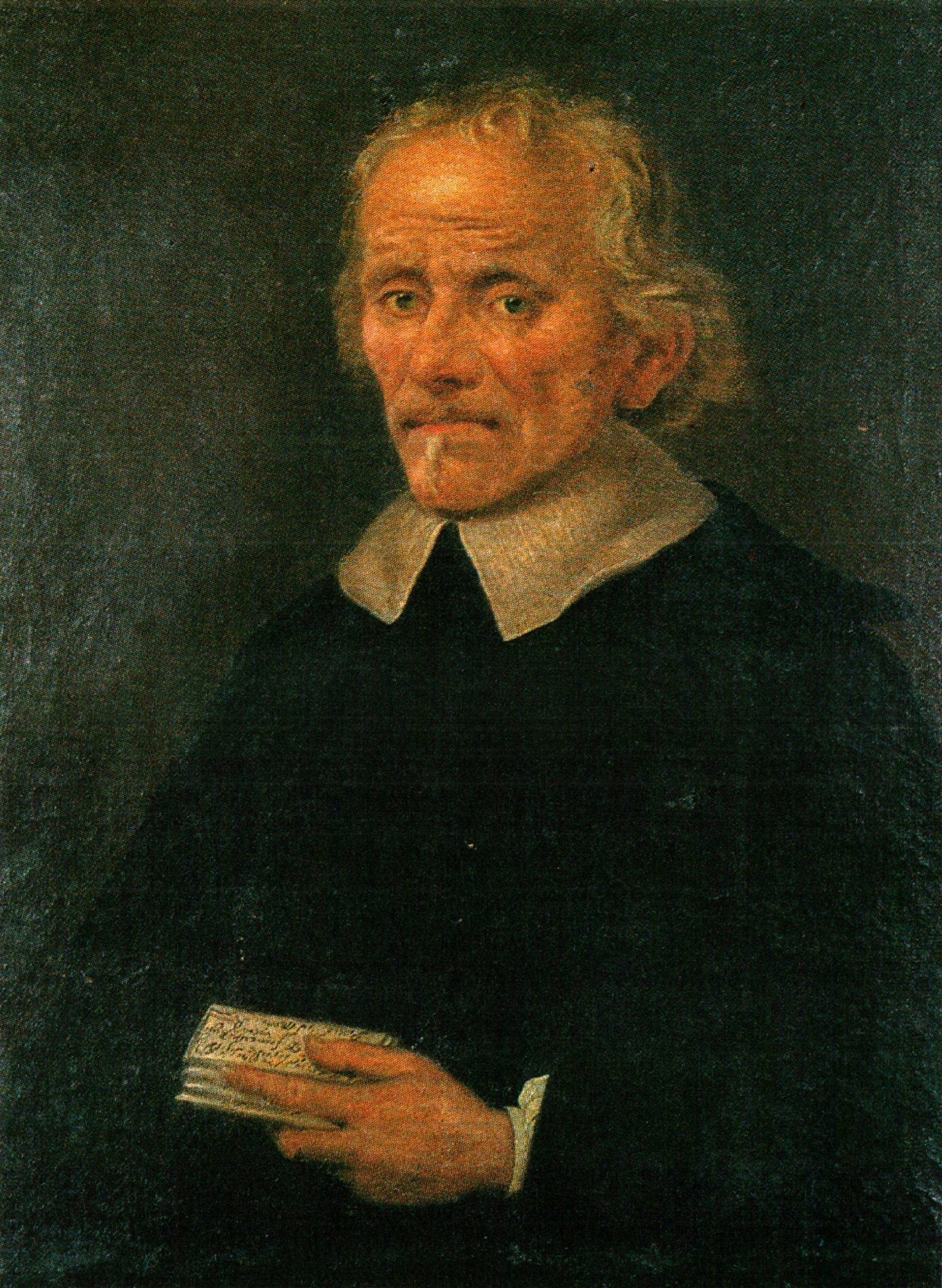
Francesco Negri

Francesco Negri (Italian pronunciation: [franˈtʃesko ˈneːɡri]; 27 March 1623–27 December 1698) was an Italian Catholic priest who, during 1663–1666, travelled in Scandinavia. In 1670, he published an account of his travels entitled Viaggio settentrionale.

== Biography ==
Negri was born in Ravenna, then part of the Papal States, and left his home city in 1663 to set out on his travels. When the middle-aged priest left his hometown of Ravenna and undertook a three-year voyage in Scandinavia, he became the first. Thus, he was seen as unusual for an Italian by the Scandinavians in travelling independently, reflecting the contemporary image of his compatriots by other nations. As an example, King Frederick III of Denmark expressed surprise at seeing him so far from home.

Negri wrote often with a scientific perspective, examining the flora and fauna of the region, and made a series of anthropological observations, especially on the physical characteristics of the Sámi, the indigenous people of Lapland. His approach was far from being reliably scientific in the modern sense, however, and he took his native region of Italy as the norm for considering differences with other populations.

Francesco Negri died in 1698, and his heirs had the manuscript published, which he had taken to the printer a few days before his death.
