= Trebius Niger =

Trebius Niger was an ancient Roman author and statesman of the second century B.C. He was a companion of a certain Lucullus and in 150 B.C. was the proconsul for Hispania Baetica. He wrote a large work on natural history which was used by Pliny the Elder.

== As a fish ==
Pliny credited Trebius for his work on ichthyology. However, this acknowledgment was misinterpreted by Thomas of Cantimpré when he wrote his Opus de natura rerum, using Pliny as a source. As such, Thomas records a nonexistent fish called the "black trebius" (trebius niger in Latin). He is followed in this error by St. Albert the Great in his monumental treatise De Animalibus.
