= Dennis Mallonee =

American writer of comic books (born 1955)

- Born: January 22, 1955 (age 71)
- Occupations: Writer, publisher, editor
- Known for: Champions comic book Heroic Publishing

Dennis Mallonee (born January 22, 1955) is an American writer and publisher of comic books. He is best known as the writer of the Champions comics and the founder of Heroic Publishing.

== Education ==
Mallonee graduated from the California Institute of Technology with a degree in economics.

== Career ==
Dennis Mallonee entered the comics profession by suggesting story ideas to writer Bill Mantlo. Mallonee and artist Rick Hoberg developed the format for Marvel's Official Handbook of the Marvel Universe series.

At a 1985 San Diego Comic-Con panel featuring Champions RPG creators Steve Peterson, George MacDonald, and Ray Greer, an audience member asked when the Champions characters were going to be adapted into comic book form. The RPG creators had no plans for such a translation at the time. Mallonee, however, who was already writing several Champions supplements, was in the audience and spoke up that he would be willing to write a Champions comic. Following the panel, Mallonnee, Peterson, and MacDonald discussed terms for the series; among the key points were that all the characters would remain fully creator-owned, and that Mallonee would have creative control of the comic book.

Shortly thereafter, Mallonee sought a comic book licenses to the Champions characters at reached out to Hero Games who owned Champions. Hero Games was only licensing the characters from the original players who created them for the role-playing game, and Hero Games was able to make an arrangement with the creators of the characters for the permissions Mallonee needed and he was able to publish a Champions (1986-1987) comic book series through Eclipse Comics.

The Champions series by Eclipse was successful, so Mallonee published additional Champions comics series using his own imprint, which he first called Hero Comics and then Hero Graphics, and finally Heroic Publishing. Heroes Comics published roughly 100 comic books involving several series over the next six years, especially titles featuring the Champions and focused on the Guardians team from Hero Games and their popular member Flare.

Hero Games grew increasingly unhappy with changes in tone as the publication run of the comics continued (including an increasing focus on pinup art), so some of the owners pulled the licensing rights to their characters, although Gleen Thain and Stacy Lawrence allowed Mallonnee to continue using their characters Icestar and Flare. Hero Games removed the creator-owned characters from new editions of the Champions game while Mallonee was using them for Champions comics, to avoid confusion. Mallonee at the same time changed the names of Champions comics characters when the licensing was removed, so for example with the characters owned by Bruce Harlick, Marksman was changed to Huntsman and Foxbat was now called The Flying Fox. Mallonee created many original characters for the comics over the years as well, distinguishing his comics universe further from the Champions universe owned by Hero Games.

From 2009 to 2012, Mallonee and artists Tim Burgard, Gordon Purcell, and Mark Beachum produced a Flare weekly newspaper strip, syndicated by Creators Syndicate.

=== Champions trademark dispute ===
Marvel Comics published a Champions comic book series from 1975 to 1978. Since 1986, Mallonee and his publishing entities have used the name "The Champions" for various comic book series adapted from the Champions role-playing game series. In 1988, The United States Patent and Trademark Office ruled that Marvel abandoned its trademark of the name and could no longer use "The Champions" as the name of a comic book series. Marvel later re-acquired rights to the trademark, publishing a new The Champions series in 2016.

== Bibliography ==
=== Comics Interview ===
- Southern Knights #35-36 (1992)

=== Eclipse Comics ===
- Champions #1-6 (1986-1987)

=== Heroic Publishing ===
- The Adventures of Chrissie Claus #2 (1994)
- The Black Enchantress #1-3 (2005)
- Champions #1-12 (1987-1988)
- Champions vol. 2 #1 (1992)
- Champions vol. 4 #3-4 (2006)
- Champions Annual #1 (1988)
- Champions Classics #13-14 (1993-1994)
- Champions / Flare Adventures #2, 8-12 (1992-1993)
- Eternity Smith #1-9 (1987-1988)
- Flare #1-3 (1988-1989)
- Flare vol. 2 #1-16 (1990-1994)
- Flare vol. 3 #2, 27-29 (2004-2005)
- Flare Adventures #19 (2007)
- Flare First Edition #4-5, 7-11 (1993)
- Icicle #1-5 (1992-1993)
- Independent Publisher's Group Spotlight #0 (1993)
- Lady Arcane #1-4 (1992-1993)
- League of Champions #1-3, 5-7, 9-11 (1990-1993)
- Liberty Comics #0, 1 (2007)
- Liberty Girl #0, 1-3 (2006-2007)
- The Marksman #1-5, Annual #1 (1988)
- Murcielaga She-Bat #2 (1993)
- Rose #1-5 (1992-1993)
- Roy Thomas' Anthem #1, 4 (2006-2007)
- The Tigress #1, 3-6 (1992-1993)
- Witchgirls Inc. #1-5 (2005-2007)

=== Marvel Comics ===
- Iron Man #209 (1986)
- Marvel Fanfare #42 (Captain Marvel) (1989)
- Marvel Super-Heroes vol. 2 #2 (Tigra) (1990)
- Official Handbook of the Marvel Universe Deluxe Edition #6-15 (1986-1987)
- Solo Avengers #5 (Scarlet Witch) (1988)

=== Renegade Press ===
- Eternity Smith #1-5 (1986-1987)
