= League of Champions =

Superhero team

Publication information
- Publisher: Heroic Publishing
- First appearance: Champions #1 (Eclipse Comics, June 1986)
- Created by: Dennis Mallonee and Carol Lay

In-story information
- Member(s): Flare, Icestar, Rose, Huntsman, Giant, Superion

The League of Champions (originally simply the Champions) are a superhero team first appearing in 1981 in the Champions role-playing game by Hero Games, and subsequently (with different lineups) in comic book series published first by Eclipse Comics as Champions in 1986, and later by Heroic Publishing as League of Champions starting in 1987. The fictional heroes are headquartered in San Francisco.

== Background ==
The team and characters were introduced in 1981 as the example superhero team in the Champions role-playing game. At a 1985 San Diego Comic-Con panel featuring Champions RPG creators Steve Peterson, George MacDonald, and Ray Greer, an audience member asked when these characters were going to be adapted into comic-book form. The RPG creators had no plans for such a conversion at the time. However, Dennis Mallonee, who was already writing several Champions supplements, was in the audience and spoke up that he would be willing to write a Champions comic. Following the panel, Mallonee, Peterson, and MacDonald discussed terms for the series; among the key points were that all the characters would remain fully creator-owned, and that Mallonee would have creative control of the comic book.

The series needed a publisher, and having heard from Mark Evanier that Eclipse Comics was looking to publish another team book, Mallonee pitched the series to Eclipse co-founder Dean Mullaney and editor-in-chief Catherine Yronwode. They were receptive to the idea, and so Mallonee picked out six Champions RPG characters he wanted to use for the superhero team and sent out requests to the characters' creators for permission to use them in the comic book. He obtained permission to use six:

- Flare, Terri Feran, with the abilities of strength and photonic energy; created by Stacy Thain.
- Icestar, John Grayson, with icing powers; created by Glenn Thain.
- Rose, Julie Rich, whose psychic abilities are also accompanied by the scent of the flower for which she is named; created by Tom Tumey; later turned into Psyche in the comics
- Marksman, Donald Henderson, a former soldier with enhanced reflexes and various weapons produced by the company he runs in civilian; created by Bruce Harlick; later turned into Donald Hunter, a.k.a. Huntsman, in the comics
- Giant, who can increase his size and strength with a special harness he wears.
- Superion, Shawn Jacobs, a mutant with super-strength, invulnerability, and flight.

The sixth character he wanted to use was Gargoyle; creator Mark Williams refused permission because he had other plans for the character. However, he allowed the comic book to mention Gargoyle, an option which Mallonee made use of, since he had already come up with a backstory for Flare in which Gargoyle had an important part. Other Champions who were mentioned in the series, but not shown, are Transpower, Dove (not to be confused with the DC Comics character), and Nightwind (not to be confused with the Marvel Comics character).

Mallonee's original plan for the series called for six issues of short solo stories that would develop the backgrounds and characters of the individual Champions, and in a subtle manner lead into the giant-sized Champions No. 7 and 8, in which the five heroes would unite as a team to battle the forces of Demon. However, Eclipse Comics felt this scheme ran contrary to their desire for a team book, and rejected it, telling Mallonee to instead write a six-issue series dealing solely with the team's conflict with Demon. Mallonee added one of his own Champions characters to the comic, a wheelchair-using man who had been a hero under the name of Doctor Arcane, solely as someone who would explain all the essential Demon backstory that would have otherwise been covered in the short solo stories.

== Publication history ==
Champions No. 1 sold very well, but sales hit a sharp decline in other issues, and this convinced Eclipse to leave Champions as a six-issue limited series. Issue No. 2 introduced penciller Chris Marrinan and inker Dell Barras to the series; the trio of Mallonee, Marrinan, and Barras became the title's longest-running creative team.

Mallonee founded comics-publishing company Hero Comics (later renamed Heroic Publishing), and included an ongoing Champions series in its launch lineup, with the first issue dated September 1987.

The team was still also being used in the Champions role-playing game, for the first three editions, but creative differences caused a rift between Heroic Publishing and Hero Games, leading to the game using a different team in later editions, and several of the characters in the League of Champions comics being retconned to change names and other details because they had originated with creators associated with Hero Games: Rose became Psyche, Donald "Marksman" Henderson became Donald "Huntsman" Hunter, and a villain originally named Foxbat (created by Bruce Harlick and Mark Williams) became the Flying Fox.

Hero/Heroic also spun off the character Flare into her own comics, Flare and Flare: First Edition, plus a Flare collectible card game. Marksman (before the Huntsman rename) also received a stand-alone self-titled series, The Marksman, but it was less successful and was short-lived. The superhero roster of the Champions (before they became the League of Champions) expanded in the seventh issue (vol. 2, March 1988) with the addition of Flare's sister Sparkplug, and Icestar's sister Icicle. Additional side material has also been published, including a series of Tales of the Champions specials.

In 1992, the League of Champions and Flare were teamed up with the Southern Knights (originally published by Comics Interview) for a multi-part story called "The Morrigan Wars".

== Marvel trademark dispute ==
Marvel Comics had published a Champions comic book series from 1975 to 1978. Hero Games' use of the name for its RPG initiated a dispute with Marvel. In 1988, The United States Patent and Trademark Office ruled that Marvel had abandoned its trademark of the name and could no longer use "The Champions" as the name of a comic book series — thus also paving the way for Mallonee to publish his Champions comic books. Marvel later re-acquired rights to the trademark, publishing a new The Champions series in 2016.

== See also ==
- Champions Online, a video-game outgrowth of the original RPG
