= Falcon (comics) =

Marvel Comics superhero

Samuel Thomas "Sam" Wilson Falcon
- Falcon taken from the variant cover of Falcon #1 (October 2017). Art by Alex Ross.

Publication information
- Publisher: Marvel Comics
- First appearance: As Falcon: Captain America #117 (September 1969); As Captain America: Captain America (vol. 7) #25 (December 2014)
- Created by: Stan Lee (writer/editor); Gene Colan (artist)

In-story information
- Alter ego: Samuel Thomas "Sam" Wilson
- Species: Human
- Team affiliations: Avengers; S.H.I.E.L.D. "Defenders for a Day"; Heroes for Hire; Mighty Avengers; Avengers Unity Squad
- Partnerships: Captain America; Bucky Barnes
- Notable aliases: "Snap" Wilson; Falcon; Blackwing; Blackbird; Captain America
- Abilities: Empathic and telepathic link with all birds; Flight via wing harness; Skilled martial artist, aerialist, and acrobat; Proficient tactician and strategist; Skilled hand-to-hand combatant; Expert bird trainer

The Falcon is a superhero appearing in American comic books published by Marvel Comics. The character was introduced by writer-editor Stan Lee and artist Gene Colan in Captain America #117 (Sept. 1969).

Falcon is the superhero persona of Samuel Thomas "Sam" Wilson, who uses mechanical wings to fly, defend, and attack. He also has limited telepathic and empathic control over birds. After Steve Rogers retired, Wilson became Captain America in All-New Captain America #1 (Jan. 2015) and the leader of the Avengers.

In a significant move for representation in American comics, the Falcon became the first African American superhero and the second Black superhero to debut in a mainstream monthly publication, following Marvel's Black Panther. The character's prominence grew significantly in February 1971 with the release of Captain America #134. For the first time, the comic’s cover title was officially changed to Captain America and The Falcon. This issue marked a historic moment as an African American hero received co-billing on a major comic book, signaling a direct marketing effort to an even wider mainstream American audience.

Sam Wilson as Falcon and Captain America has made several media appearances, including in the Marvel Cinematic Universe, where the character is portrayed by Anthony Mackie in the films Captain America: The Winter Soldier (2014); Avengers: Age of Ultron (2015); Ant-Man (2015); Captain America: Civil War (2016); Avengers: Infinity War (2018); Avengers: Endgame (2019); the television miniseries The Falcon and the Winter Soldier (2021) as Falcon; and in Captain America: Brave New World (2025) as Captain America, and the upcoming Avengers: Doomsday (2026).

== Publication history ==
=== Creation and development ===
Samuel Thomas Wilson, known as Falcon, was the first Black American superhero in mainstream comic books. (Note: Marvel had previously introduced the Black Panther, a native of the fictional African country Wakanda. The first comic starring a black character was Dell Comics' Old West gunfighter Lobo, introduced in 1965.) The character first appeared in Captain America #117 (Sept. 1969).

Created by writer-editor Stan Lee and artist Gene Colan, he came about, Colan recalled in 2008,

...in the late 1960s [when news of the] Vietnam War and civil rights protests were regular occurrences, and Stan, always wanting to be at the forefront of things, started bringing these headlines into the comics. ... One of the biggest steps we took in this direction came in Captain America. I enjoyed drawing people of every kind. I drew as many different types of people as I could into the scenes I illustrated, and I loved drawing black people. I always found their features interesting and so much of their strength, spirit and wisdom written on their faces. I approached Stan, as I remember, with the idea of introducing an African-American hero and he took to it right away. ... I looked at several African-American magazines, and used them as the basis of inspiration for bringing The Falcon to life.

In mainstream American superhero comics, the only Black characters who preceded Falcon were Gabe Jones (debuted in 1963), Black Panther (1966), Bill Foster (1966), Spider-Man supporting characters Joe Robertson (1967) and his son Randy (1968); the villain Man-Ape was created the same year (1969).

He was introduced as an unnamed former resident of New York City's Harlem neighborhood, who had adopted a wild falcon he trained and named Redwing. His own name, Sam Wilson, was not given until the following issue. When a group of men on an island "in the tropics" wanted a hunting falcon, Wilson answered the ad, only to discover that the self-dubbed "Exiles" were former Nazis in league with the supervillain the Red Skull. He escaped, but remained on the island to organize the natives to confront the Exiles, who had turned them into serfs. At the urging of Steve Rogers, whom he later learned was Captain America, Wilson took on the costumed identity of the Falcon and underwent training with Rogers to better inspire the villagers and lead the fight.

=== 1970s and 1980s ===
Through most of the 1970s, the Falcon and Captain America were a team in New York City. The series was cover-billed Captain America and the Falcon for several years, from issues #134–192 and 194–222 (Feb. 1971–June 1978), though still copyrighted as Captain America. In issue #186 (June 1975), writer Steve Englehart retconned aspects of the Falcon's past. Originally depicted as a former social worker, motivated by a desire to better the lives of inner-city youth, the Falcon was revealed as a mob-connected thug named "Snap Wilson" whose memories were altered by the Red Skull. The Falcon resisted the Red Skull's mind control and maintained his heroism; however, the story was very controversial, and Englehart himself later decided that the Red Skull had fabricated the backstory.

The Falcon briefly joined the superhero team the Defenders, appearing in issues #62–64 (August–October 1978). He was also a member of the Avengers from issues #183–194 (May 1979 – April 1980), although he was recruited to fill a racial quota; he left because he perceived himself to be included as a token. During this time he also starred in a solo adventure in issue #49 of the try-out series Marvel Premiere (August 1979); however, the story was not a try-out for a Falcon series, but an intended fill-in issue of Captain America which was shuffled into Marvel Premiere when the editors objected to having an issue of Captain America with someone other than the title character as the star. He starred in his own four-issue miniseries in 1983, written by Jim Owsley (later known as Christopher Priest). Its first issue was illustrated by Paul Smith with the final three issues by Mark Bright. The series revealed that the Falcon was a mutant, although this development was later retconned in The Avengers 2001 Annual.

=== 1990s and after ===
After regularly appearing in Captain America vol. 2 (Nov. 1996–Nov. 1997), the Falcon rejoined the Avengers in The Avengers vol. 3, #1 (Feb. 1998). This time, he remained with the team, becoming one of its most prominent members by issue #57 (Oct. 2002). Concurrently, he was also a supporting character in Captain America vols. 3–4 (Jan. 1998–Feb. 2002 and June 2002–Dec. 2004). The Falcon next appeared in the short-lived Captain America and the Falcon series, in 2004 and 2005. After the events of the storyline "Avengers Disassembled", when the Scarlet Witch temporarily restored his criminal personality, the Falcon became a supporting character in Captain America vol. 5 (Jan. 2005–July 2009). The Falcon continued to play a significant role in the series after it returned to its original numbering, beginning with Captain America #600 (Aug. 2009).

Falcon was a member of the Avengers in the 2012 Marvel NOW! relaunch.

On July 16, 2014, Marvel Comics announced that Sam Wilson would relinquish the mantle of Falcon and would become the new Captain America, succeeding Steve Rogers in the role. During this run, it is established that Sam Wilsons's "Snap" backstory as a drug-dealing pimp was fake memories implanted by the Red Skull to discredit Sam through racism. He first appeared as Captain America in Captain America vol. 7 #25 (December 2014).

An ongoing series starring Sam Wilson as Captain America launched in October 2015, as part of Marvel's post-Secret Wars relaunch, written by Nick Spencer and Daniel Acuña.

Wilson temporarily returns to the role of Captain America in the 2017 miniseries Marvel's Generations.

Wilson resumed the identity of Falcon in a series written by Rodney Barnes that debuted in late 2017, the character's first solo series since 1983.

== Fictional character biography ==
=== Early life ===
Samuel Thomas Wilson was born in Harlem, New York City, to Paul Wilson, a prominent minister, and Darlene Wilson. Wilson had a happy childhood and finds he has a natural affinity for birds. He takes up training pigeons, and has the largest pigeon coop in Harlem. In his teens, however, encounters with racism leave him jaded. When he is 16, Wilson refuses to join the church, believing his deeply religious parents to be ignorant for their faith. To his surprise, rather than put up a fight, his parents provide him with books on different religions and comparative theology. The next night, however, Sam's father is killed trying to break up a neighborhood fight (originally Paul was said to have been killed when Sam was 9 years old). Two years later, his mother is shot and killed by a mugger one block from their apartment. The tragic death of his parents does not stop Sam from being a respected community volunteer.

As a grown adult, Sam continued doing social work and meets Captain America on Exile Island (years later, he would say "I actually loved this place quite a bit. It's where I met my two best friends," referring to Captain America and Redwing). The once-peaceful island had been taken over by the Exiles, a group of would-be world conquerors who had collaborated with the Nazi supervillain the Red Skull during World War II. They had been betrayed by the Red Skull and were forced to remain in hiding on the island, enslaving the natives. Wilson finds and befriends Redwing, a falcon with which he feels a remarkably strong bond.

=== Becoming the Falcon ===
Wilson is an upright and cheerful social worker who is eventually lured to the Exiles' island and organizes the natives to fight for their freedom. Steve Rogers (Captain America) befriends him there and convinces Wilson to adopt a persona to inspire the natives in their rebellion. The two create the costumed persona the Falcon and train together extensively before attacking and defeating the Exiles and the Red Skull. The Falcon becomes Captain America's regular partner in crime-fighting, and briefly even takes on the Captain America costume and identity when Rogers is believed to have been killed.

Later, again as the Falcon, Wilson receives help from Black Panther, who creates a harness for him, allowing him to fly. When Rogers briefly abandons his Captain America identity, others attempt to take up the mantle, including a young man named Roscoe whom the Falcon mentors. When the Red Skull eventually kills Roscoe, Rogers again becomes Captain America.

Soon afterwards, the Red Skull tricks Sam into believing that he had a secret past as Snap Wilson, a professional Los Angeles criminal and gang member persona created out of grief and "angry at the world" following the death of Sam's parents. Red Skull makes the untruthful claim that the Cosmic Cube was used to erase the memories of this Snap Wilson past so that Sam could be used as a mole for Red Skull. Red Skull then unsuccessfully attempts to use the Cosmic Cube to make the Falcon kill Captain America. Believing in the existence of this fake criminal past but deciding to continue as a hero, the Falcon is eventually named head of the Super Agents at the espionage agency S.H.I.E.L.D.

US government superhero liaison Henry Peter Gyrich then recruits Wilson, one of the few active black superheroes, to fill a mandated racial quota for the venerable team the Avengers. Resentful of being a "token", the Falcon quits at the first opportunity. He debuts a new costume when he fights the supervillain Taskmaster.

=== 2000s ===
Falcon becomes a member of the new team of Avengers assembled to fight the international menace Scorpio as a United Nations peacekeeping agency. By this point, Falcon had discovered that he could extend his telepathic bond with Redwing, allowing him to control other birds and "see" through their eyes. He uses this ability to spy on Henry Gyrich (now the Avengers' liaison with the United Nations) and discovers that the United States' Secretary of Defense, Dell Rusk, has been pressuring Gyrich to spy on the Avengers and turn over their secrets. Although initially hostile to one another, Falcon convinces Gyrich to help the Avengers spy on Rusk, feeding him false information while gathering evidence to expose him. They discover that Rusk is actually the Red Skull, who has launched a biological weapon attack on the United States, intending to use the ensuing panic to gain control over America's government and start a war with other countries. Falcon is instrumental in defeating the Red Skull.

It is around this period of time that, a new "Captain America" secretly created by the Office of Naval Intelligence (O.N.I.) goes rogue and begins eliminating anything and anyone he sees as a source of terrorism. To draw out this agent (dubbed the "Anti-Cap"), O.N.I. leaks information about their involvement in a biological weapons project with the notorious Rivas Family, powerful Cuban drug lords. Reporter and social activist Leila Taylor investigates this rumor and attempts to smuggle a sample of the virus into America, but she is arrested by U.S. forces in Cuba. Falcon, who is a friend of Taylor, breaks her out of prison and investigates her claims, destroying the Rivas Family's biological weapons lab and obtaining a sample of the mysterious virus they were developing for O.N.I. Falcon is able to fly Leila back to America (although his flying harness is destroyed in a hurricane) while Captain America follows Falcon's directions and retrieves the virus sample. The Anti-Cap kills the head of the Rivas family, and pursues Leila, Falcon, and Cap, intent on obtaining the virus sample. After reuniting, Falcon and Captain America are able to barely defeat the Anti-Cap. Realizing that O.N.I.'s goal was to draw out their rogue agent to execute him, Captain America arranges to have the Anti-Cap secretly imprisoned in the Wakandan embassy until O.N.I. agrees not to kill him.

Since Captain America and Falcon now possess both O.N.I.'s rogue agent and the last remaining sample of O.N.I.'s virus, O.N.I. begins to put increasing amounts of pressure on the heroes. Falcon is especially targeted – he had broken Leila out of Federal Custody, and his alleged criminal history makes it easier for O.N.I. to create further false charges against him. Falcon soon finds himself on the run from O.N.I.

Meanwhile, the superheroine the Scarlet Witch, having gone insane, begins using her powers to recreate many of the Avengers' greatest trials and tragedies. She destabilizes the Falcon's mind, causing him to act increasingly like the "Snap Wilson" persona. He begins carrying a gun, keeps secrets from his friends, assaults Leila's boyfriend Norman when he protests they go into hiding, and uses a high power rifle to shoot at his friend Robbie Robertson (to fool Robbie into thinking O.N.I. was threatening to kill him). Although they succeed in exposing the illegal activities of O.N.I. and clear Wilson's name, Sam's methods cause his relationship with Captain America to become strained. Cap confronts Falcon about his recent actions, and Falcon, angered at what he sees as an ultimatum, terminates their partnership. As they are walking away, Norman (who blames Falcon for the end of his relationship with Leila) appears and shoots at Falcon. Captain America is seriously injured by the stray bullets, and even appears to die. The shock of watching his best friend seemingly die because of his actions has a powerful effect on Sam, who briefly gives up being Falcon and reexamines his life.

Sam Wilson reappears as Falcon in the 2005 "House of M" storyline and in the 2006–07 "Civil War" storyline. In the latter, he supports Captain America against the Superhuman Registration Act. When Captain America is incapacitated, Falcon temporarily assumes leadership of the "Secret Avengers" rebel group. Following Captain America's assassination by the machinations of the Red Skull, the Falcon registers with the government and is made responsible for Harlem, although he continues to maintain contact with the underground New Avengers. He is also called upon to investigate the Captain's assassination by locating Winter Soldier and tracking down the Red Skull.

=== Becoming Captain America ===
Wilson as Captain America on the cover of All-New Captain America #1 (November 2014). Art by Stuart Immonen.

Wilson appears in the 2010 "Shadowland" storyline as Falcon, after which he becomes an operative in the new incarnation of the Heroes for Hire team, in the book of the same name. He later appears in the 2012 "Avengers vs. X-Men" storyline, helping She-Hulk and several other Avengers contain the students at the Jean Grey School for Higher Learning.

As part of the 2012-2015 Marvel NOW! relaunch, Wilson rejoins the Avengers after Iron Man and Captain America choose to expand the team's line-up. After Rogers is aged into an old man, he appoints Wilson as his 'official' replacement as Captain America. During a confrontation with the Red Skull's daughter Sin, it is revealed that the "Snap" identity was a fake memory implanted into Sam by the Red Skull in an attempt to discredit the hero through racism.

As part of the 2015 All-New, All-Different Marvel initiative, Captain America investigated the disappearance of Mexican teenager Joaquin Torres after he was abducted by the Sons of the Serpent. After fighting Armadillo and capturing the leader of the hate group, Captain America discovered that Joaquin was being used in the experiments of Karl Malus who turned Joaquin into a bird/human hybrid using Captain America's pet bird Redwing. When Karl Malus was defeated, Captain America took Joaquin in. Captain America learned from Claire Temple that Joaquin's condition was permanent due to him inheriting Redwing's vampiric healing factor. When Captain America was captured by the Serpent Society and thrown out the window by Viper, he was saved by Joaquin. Using his link with Redwing, Captain America telepathically sent Joaquin the knowledge on how to fight where he held his own until Misty Knight and Demolition Man showed up. After the Serpent Society was defeated, Captain America allowed Joaquin to become his sidekick, enabling him to become the new Falcon.

During the 2016 "Avengers: Standoff!" storyline, Sam, after defeating the Green Skull, is contacted by Whisperer (an alias of Rick Jones). After meeting Whisperer, he learns that S.H.I.E.L.D. never discarded the Kobik project as he thought they did. He meets with Steve Rogers, where they follow a lead to a town in Connecticut and are later picked up by S.H.I.E.L.D. agents. He then meets the Winter Soldier and rescue S.H.I.E.L.D. agent Avril Kincaid from the Blood Brothers, who informs them of a super-weapon hidden in the town that Baron Zemo and the other villains are looking for. They then head to the bowling alley where Kobik uses her powers to restore Steve Rogers to his prime when he was about to be killed by Crossbones. They begin looking for Kobik again only to discover that Zemo had Fixer invent a device that would help find Kobik as Kraven the Hunter rallies the villains to help with their goals. Upon not being able to successfully locate Kobik, Steve Rogers decides to rally the heroes so that they can take the fight to Zemo. In the aftermath of the incident, Steve and Sam plan to keep what happened at Pleasant Hill under wraps at the time being.

After the "Standoff!" storyline, Sam begins to face public pressure to return the shield and mantle of Captain America to Steve, as does Maria Hill for the consequences of her actions on Pleasant Hill. He and Steve secretly plan to make Hill face her crimes publicly. During a press conference, Sam encounters the mercenary Chance who was about to kill Steve in the middle of his speech. After defeating him, Sam receives a hero's welcome when Steve announces him to the public as Captain America. While getting arrested, Chance tells Sam that he was on Pleasant Hill and that he did not agree with the heroes' actions.

During the 2016 "Civil War II" storyline, Captain America attends War Machine's funeral, where he delivers an inspirational speech. He then has private conversations with Iron Man and Captain Marvel, over which side he should choose. Months later, Wilson watches a TV broadcast about former New Warrior Rage engaging in a fight with the Americops, a private police force funded by Keane Industries, in Brooklyn. Intending to stop the fight, Wilson, along with Redwing and Falcon, try to contain the situation. Sam manages to stop the fight, although not without fighting the Americops, for which he knew the media would portray him negatively. As he leaves, he is attacked from behind by U.S. Agent. After a brief argument, Captain America and U.S. Agent begin to fight, with U.S. Agent gaining the upper hand, until Sam drags him into a tunnel where the darkness and the great horned owls that reside in it allow him to win the fight. After defeating U.S. Agent and receiving an argument from Rage, Wilson returns to his headquarters where he decides to put a tiny implant in his brain that will enhance his ability to see what birds see, enabling him to transmit them into a data storage facility that converts them into images and videos. He decides to further investigate the Americops to find proof of their violent activities.

While accompanying Steve Rogers on a mission to stop Flag-Smasher from leaking America's nuclear launch codes, Wilson fails to save a senator from being shot by the villain, further compromising his current public image. This is subsequently revealed to have been deliberately staged by Rogers who has been converted to believe he is a Hydra sleeper agent since childhood. Using his greater familiarity with the shield, Rogers deliberately put Wilson in a position where he would be unable to use the shield to save the senator, with the final goal of demoralizing Sam to the point where he will return the shield to Rogers of his own free will (not wanting to kill Wilson and risk creating a martyr).

After discovering that Rage was arrested and accused of robbing a pawn shop which Man Mountain Marko and Speed Demon committed, Sam offers him professional help from other heroes, but Rage turns it down, preferring that he should be the one to prove his innocence. After consulting with his brother and Rogers, Sam posts a video on the internet showing footage of the Americops beating up Rage, exposing their violent activities. During Rage's trial, a frustrated Sam leaves the courtroom and captures Speed Demon, who confesses to his and Marko's involvement in the pawn shop robbery. Upon returning to the court, Misty tells Sam that the verdict was already given. While people protest over Rage's arrest, Sam tries his best to calm them. Sam leaves a letter which explains he is ending his role as Captain America and returning the shield to Steve Rogers.

During the 2017 "Secret Empire" storyline, Sam has spent time alone in a desert and returns to the city where he discovers Hydra's takeover of the United States and that Steve Rogers is their leader. Sam rescues a woman and her Inhuman daughter from Hydra enforcers, Sam reluctantly helps them to safety. He reunites with Misty Knight and Demolition Man and helps smuggle other Inhumans out of the country. He helps Ant-Man smuggle his daughter Cassie Lang then declines their offer to join the underground resistance. When Hawkeye and the Tony Stark A.I. reveal that Kobik was responsible for Steve's change, Sam agrees to help smuggle them out of the country so they can find the Cosmic Cube's fragments. Sam takes the group through an abandoned subway tunnel where they encounter Mole Man, with whom Sam strikes a deal when they are attacked by Dreadnoughts sent by Hydra. After crossing the tunnel, the group departs in a jet plane. They arrive in a mansion where Ultron resides, since he is in possession of the shard. They encounter Steve Rogers and his Avengers until Ultron captures them. After a brief battle, Ultron allows them to leave and gives the shard to Tony's team. Steve muses that he is unconcerned about who will acquire the fragments as he has an inside man in the Tony Stark A.I.'s team.

After a series of dead ends, the team returns to the hideout, where Sam reunites with Misty, until Hydra forces arrive and begin their assault on the base. During the battle, Sam helps the other heroes in protecting the refugees and battling Hydra's Avengers and a revived Bruce Banner as the Hulk until the base explodes. In the aftermath of the attack, Sam appears standing on top of the rubble as Captain America to inspire America's superheroes not to surrender. It is later revealed that Sam had a conversation with Misty Knight and Rayshaun Lucas, the new Patriot, which has persuaded him to reassume the role of Captain America, leading the resistance and wielding Rogers' original round shield as a symbol of hope. Sam uses the Cosmic Cube fragment acquired by the resistance to help destroy the Darkforce dome surrounding Manhattan and the planetary defense shield, releasing all the trapped heroes. Liberating all the imprisoned Inhumans, the Underground attacks the Capitol which attracts the attention of Steve Rogers, who arrives wearing Cosmic Cube-powered armor. During the final battle, Sam fakes surrender and gives the fragment to Steve, only for Winter Soldier to intervene and bring Kobik and the real Steve Rogers back. The restored Steve Rogers manages to defeat the Hydra Steve Rogers with Thor's hammer and Kobik restores reality back to normal.

=== Return as Falcon ===
Upon taking the second Patriot on as his sidekick, they travel to Chicago to deal with an outbreak of gang violence, unaware that Blackheart is posing as the city's mayor.

== Powers, abilities, and equipment ==
=== Powers and abilities ===
In his earliest appearances, Wilson exhibits a close bond with his bird Redwing, which is confirmed as being a telepathic link by Professor X in Captain America #174. The Red Skull later claims that he had used the Cosmic Cube to create a "super-normal mental link" between Sam Wilson and Redwing. Falcon later recalled memories of such an experience, stating he "Hurt like hell. Being mentally fused with that falcon. Able to see through his eyes".

Wilson eventually revealed that he has been able to extend this empathic link. "I'm always psychically connected with Redwing, but through concentration, I've recently tapped into another ability - I'm able to link-up with other birds. I have over six billion pairs of eyes in the United States alone". He used this ability to quickly search New York City when the criminal Scarecrow kidnapped two children, as well as to spy on Senator Dell Rusk (actually the Red Skull in disguise) and Henry Peter Gyrich. He is also apparently able to access the memories of birds, and see things they had witnessed in the past (although birds have a different concept of the passage of time, which makes it difficult for him to know when any events they witnessed occurred).

Wilson is a skilled hand-to-hand combatant, having been trained in Judo and Karate by Steve Rogers. Wilson is also highly skilled in the use of Captain America's shield.

=== Uniform and flight harness ===
Wilson's original Falcon wing harness featured detachable jet-powered glider wings made of lightweight titanium ribbing and Mylar. The wings were covered with wafer-thin solar power receptors that convert sunlight into electricity to power miniature high-speed electric turbine fans in his uniform and boots. The wings detached and reattached to his uniform cybernetically. The uniform was made of synthetic stretch fabric lined with a steel-alloy mesh.

After the harness was destroyed in Captain America and the Falcon #2 (2004), the Black Panther supplied Falcon with a new costume and wings. An emitter array on Falcon's back creates holographic "hard light" wings with a maximum wingspan of up to 50 feet (15 m). Controlled by a cybernetic link, the wings can be instantly reconfigured into "dozens of different cruise configurations". A "magnetic drive", in turn, provides the thrust needed to get Falcon airborne. The emitter also possesses GPS jamming devices that prevent satellite tracking, while the hard-light wings interfere with infra-red tracking. A vibranium microweave was added to the costume itself, making Falcon resistant to small arms fire. The entire system is controlled mentally through cybernetic circuitry in the Falcon's mask. The costume has in the past featured a hidden "talon", a cybernetically controlled grappling line built into the gauntlets of his costume which he uses to entangle opponents, hook objects or for swinging and climbing when his wings are detached. The costume's visors come equipped with various capabilities, including infrared lenses, giving him the ability to see objects by their infrared signature at night, magnification capabilities, and remote imaging sensors that allow a full 360 degree of vision when activated. The cowl also has a wideband receiver and transmitter with an unspecified range. The suit was originally built by Black Panther, with costume modifications by Desmond Burrell.

== Reception ==
=== Accolades ===
- In 2012, IGN ranked Sam Wilson 96th in their "Top 100 Comic Book Heroes" list.
- In 2012, IGN ranked Sam Wilson 45th in their "Top 50 Avengers" list.
- In 2018, CBR.com ranked Sam Wilson 3rd in their "20 Versions Of Captain America Ranked Worst To Best" list.
- In 2020, CBR.com ranked Sam Wilson 3rd in their "Marvel: Every Version Of Captain America" list.
- In 2022, Collider included Sam Wilson in their "10 Strongest Superhero Sidekicks in Marvel Comics" list.
- In 2022, Newsarama ranked Sam Wilson 9th in their "Best Avengers members of all time" list.
- In 2021, CBR.com ranked Sam Wilson 5th in their "10 Smartest Marvel Sidekicks" list.
- in 2022, Screen Rant included Sam Wilson in their "10 Best Leaders Of The Avengers In Marvel Comics" list.
- In 2022, CBR.com ranked Sam Wilson 1st in their "10 Best Marvel Legacy Heroes" list and 4th in their "10 Coolest Avengers" list.

== Other characters named Falcon ==
=== Joaquin Torres ===
Joaquin Torres was introduced in the 2015 All-New, All-Different Marvel branding. He is a Mexican teenager who was abducted by the Sons of the Serpent and subsequently experimented on by Karl Malus. Malus infused Joaquin with Redwing's DNA, which transformed him into a bird hybrid.

=== Adrian Toomes ===
In a 2017 storyline, Adrian Toomes developed a modified version of his electromagnetic wing harness with a reinforced helmet and lightweight, razor-sharp, nano-woven wings that responded to his mental commands. He temporarily took the name Falcon, believing it was vacant at the time, and robbed a location in East Village. He fought Spider-Man until they were both immobilized by a new Trapster, who made off with Toomes' loot.

=== Carl Burgess ===
A similar, unrelated character of the same name and powers was created in 1939 by writer-artist Bill Everett for Marvel Comics' predecessor company, Timely Comics.

== Other versions ==
The Ultimate Marvel version of Falcon on the cover of Ultimate Comics: The Ultimates #7 (April 2012). Art by Kaare Andrews.

Many alternate universe versions of Sam Wilson have appeared throughout the character's publication history.

- In Heroes Reborn (1996), Wilson gained superhuman abilities similar to Captain America after receiving a life-saving blood transfusion from him.
- In Heroes Reborn (2021), Wilson is the sidekick of Nighthawk.
- In Secret Wars, Wilson is a member of the Thor Corps.
- In Spider-Gwen, Samantha Wilson is a gender-flipped version of Sam Wilson and her universe's version of Captain America. Sam-13 is a clone of Wilson who serves as her sidekick and is accompanied by Redwing, a robotic falcon.
- In the Ultimate Marvel universe, Wilson is an agent of S.H.I.E.L.D. whose wings are controlled via nanotechnology and can self-repair and hack into machines.
- In an alternate reality of a 1983 What If? story, Wilson – under his gang name "Snap" – is a member of a secret rebellion force in the United States turned fascist who aids Captain America in beating an impostor and leading the chastised nation back to its democratic roots.
- In a 2006 comic What If Captain America had fought in the Civil War?, the Earth-717 version of Wilson is an orphan raised by a Shawnee medicine man and fought in the American Civil War before being killed by Colonel Barnes.

== In other media ==
=== Television ===
- Sam Wilson / Falcon and Redwing appear in The Avengers: United They Stand, with the former voiced by Martin Roach. They appear as members of the Avengers.
- Sam Wilson / Falcon and Redwing appear in The Super Hero Squad Show, voiced by Alimi Ballard and Steve Blum respectively. They appear as members of the titular squad. Additionally, the series' version of the former is capable of launching his "feathers" as projectiles.
- Sam Wilson / Falcon appears in The Avengers: Earth's Mightiest Heroes, voiced by Lance Reddick. This version is an enthralled servant of Dell Rusk and member of "Code Red".
- Sam Wilson / Falcon appears in Avengers Assemble, voiced by Bumper Robinson. This version is a 17-year-old S.H.I.E.L.D. operative and member of the Avengers who was originally offered the War Machine armor, but turned it down in favor of the Falcon armor. Additionally, his wing pack is capable of assuming a "Redwing Mode", where it detaches itself and flies autonomously. During the fourth season, he is kidnapped by Kang the Conqueror and spends years in the future working to stop a black hole from destroying the Earth before eventually returning to the present.
- Sam Wilson / Falcon appears in Ultimate Spider-Man, voiced again by Bumper Robinson.
- Sam Wilson / Falcon appears in Lego Marvel Super Heroes: Avengers Reassembled, voiced again by Bumper Robinson.
- Sam Wilson / Falcon appears in Marvel Disk Wars: The Avengers.
- Sam Wilson / Falcon appears in Lego Marvel Super Heroes: Maximum Overload, voiced again by Bumper Robinson.
- Sam Wilson / Falcon appears in Marvel Super Hero Adventures, voiced by Deven Mack.
- Sam Wilson / Falcon appears in Marvel Future Avengers, voiced by Takuya Eguchi in Japanese and Bumper Robinson in English.
- Sam Wilson / Captain America makes a non-speaking cameo appearance in the Moon Girl and Devil Dinosaur episode "Today, I Am a Woman".
  - Additionally, an original incarnation of the Falcon named Rodney and Redwing appear in the episode "The Devil You Know", with the latter voiced by Bumper Robinson while the former has no dialogue.
- Sam Wilson / Captain America appears in Lego Marvel Avengers: Code Red, voiced again by Bumper Robinson.
- Sam Wilson / Captain America appears in Lego Marvel Avengers: Mission Demolition, voiced by Ogie Banks.
- Sam Wilson / Captain America appears in Iron Man and His Awesome Friends, voiced by Hero Hunter.
- Sam Wilson / Captain America appears in Lego Marvel Avengers: Strange Tails, voiced again by Ogie Banks.

=== Marvel Cinematic Universe ===
Anthony Mackie portrays Sam Wilson as the Falcon and later as Captain America in media set in the Marvel Cinematic Universe (MCU). He first appears in the film Captain America: The Winter Soldier (2014) before making subsequent appearances in the films Avengers: Age of Ultron (2015), Ant-Man (2015), Captain America: Civil War (2016), Avengers: Infinity War (2018), Avengers: Endgame (2019), and Captain America: Brave New World (2025), as well as the Disney+ miniseries The Falcon and the Winter Soldier (2021). Moreover, an alternate universe variant of Wilson / Captain America appears in the animated series What If...? episode "What If... the Hulk Fought the Mech Avengers?" (2024). Wilson will appear in the film Avengers: Doomsday (2026).

=== Video games ===
- Sam Wilson / Falcon appears as a playable character in Marvel Super Hero Squad, voiced again by Alimi Ballard.
- Sam Wilson / Falcon appears as a playable character in Marvel Super Hero Squad: The Infinity Gauntlet, voiced again by Alimi Ballard.
- Sam Wilson / Falcon appears as a playable character in Marvel Super Hero Squad: Comic Combat, voiced again by Alimi Ballard.
- Sam Wilson / Falcon appears as a playable character in Marvel Super Hero Squad Online.
- Sam Wilson / Falcon appears as a DLC character in Lego Marvel Super Heroes, voiced by Andrew Kishino.
- Sam Wilson / Falcon appears in Marvel Avengers Alliance.
- Sam Wilson / Falcon appears in Captain America: The Winter Soldier - The Official Game, voiced again by Bumper Robinson.
- The MCU incarnation of Sam Wilson / Falcon appears as an assist character in Marvel Heroes, voiced by Bumper Robinson. Additionally, an alternate universe variant of Wilson who became Captain America was added in a later update.
- Sam Wilson / Falcon appears as a playable character in Disney Infinity 2.0, voiced again by Bumper Robinson.
- The MCU incarnation of Sam Wilson / Falcon appears as a playable character in Marvel: Future Fight. Additionally, an alternate universe variant of Wilson who became Captain America was added in a later update.
- Sam Wilson / Falcon appears in Disney Infinity 3.0.
- Sam Wilson as Falcon and Captain America appear as separate playable characters in Lego Marvel's Avengers, both voiced by Anthony Mackie. He is initially available in his Classic and Captain America: The Winter Soldier designs, with his Captain America: Civil War appearance being available through DLC.
- Sam Wilson / Falcon appears as a playable character in Playmation: Avengers.
- A teenage incarnation of Sam Wilson / Falcon appears as a playable character in Marvel Avengers Academy, voiced by ASAP Rocky.
- Sam Wilson as the Falcon and Captain America appear as playable characters in Marvel Puzzle Quest.
- Sam Wilson / Falcon appears as a playable character in Marvel Ultimate Alliance 3: The Black Order, voiced again by Bumper Robinson.
- Sam Wilson as Falcon and Captain America appears in Marvel Snap.

=== Miscellaneous ===
- Sam Wilson / Falcon appears in Marvel Universe Live!.
- Sam Wilson / Captain America appears as a meet-and-greet character at Avengers Campus.

== See also ==
- List of S.H.I.E.L.D. members
- List of African-American firsts

== Bibliography ==
- Cebulski, C.B., ed. (2024). Marvel Encyclopedia: New Edition. DK. ISBN 978-0-593-84611-7.
- Howe, Sean (2012). Marvel Comics: The Untold Story. Harper Perennial. ISBN 978-0-06-199211-7.
- Smith, Troy D. (2024). Shaolin Brew: Race, Comics, and the Evolution of the Superhero. University Press of Mississippi. ISBN 978-1-4968-5168-0.
