= List of Champions members =

The Champions are various teams of superheroes that have headlined in Champions and other comic books series published by Marvel Comics. Champions have featured membership of a large number of characters.

Notations:

- A slash (/) between names, indicates codenames in chronological order that the character used in Champions.
- Characters listed are set in the Earth-616 continuity except when noted.

== Champions (1975 team) ==
=== Founding members ===
In October 1975, the first iteration of the Champions was formed to defeat Pluto in Champions #1. This team is also known as the Champions of Los Angeles.

Character	Name
Angel	Warren Kenneth Worthington III
Black Widow	Natasha Romanoff (born Natalia Alianovna Romanova)
Ghost Rider	Jonathan "Johnny" Blaze
Hercules Panhellenios
Iceman	Robert "Bobby" Louis Drake

=== Recruit ===
Character	Name	Joined in
Darkstar	Laynia Petrovna	Champions #11 (February 1977)

== Champions (2016 team) ==
=== Founding members ===
After being disillusioned by the older Avengers's actions in "Civil War II", Ms. Marvel, Nova and Spider-Man founded the second iteration of the Champions, consisting of teenage superheroes, in Champions (vol. 2) #1 (October 2016).

Character	Name
Ms. Marvel	Kamala Khan
Nova	Samuel "Sam" Alexander
Spider-Man	Miles Morales

=== Recruits ===
Character	Name	Joined in
Hulk / Brawn	Amadeus Cho	Champions (vol. 2) #1 (October 2016)
Viv Vision		Champions (vol. 2) #1 (October 2016)
Cyclops	Scott Summers	Champions (vol. 2) #2 (November 2016)
Falcon	Joaquin Torres	Champions (vol. 2) #16 (January 2018)
Patriot	Rayshaun "Shaun" Lucas	Champions (vol. 2) #16 (January 2018)
Red Locust / Locust	Fernanda Rodriguez	Champions (vol. 2) #16 (January 2018)
Ironheart	Riri Williams	Champions (vol. 2) #16 (January 2018)
Wasp	Nadia van Dyne	Champions (vol. 2) #19 (April 2018)
Snowguard	Amka Aliyak	Champions (vol. 2) #21 (June 2018)
Bombshell	Lana Baumgartner	Champions (vol. 3) #1 (January 2019)
Pinpoint	Qureshi Gupta	Champions (vol. 3) #1 (January 2019)
Power Man	Victor Alvarez	Champions (vol. 3) #1 (January 2019)
Dust	Sooraya Qadir	Champions (vol. 3) #5 (May 2019)
Starling	Tiana Toomes	Champions (vol. 4) #1 (October 2020)

=== Reinforcement members ===
In January 2019, reinforcement roster of the Champions was mentioned in Champions (vol. 3) #1.

Character	Name
Cloud 9	Abigail Boylen
Honey Badger	Gabrielle "Gabby" Kinney
Moon Girl	Lunella Lafayette
Prodigy	David Alleyne
Red Dagger	Kareem
Silk	Cindy Moon

== New Champions ==
=== Founding members ===
In January 2025, New Champions were formed in New Champions #1.

Character	Name
Cadet Marvel	Emilio Gallardo
Hellrune
Liberty	Miranda Monteiro
Moon Squire	Jaren Johnson

=== Recruits ===
Character	Name	Joined in
Amaranth Hawlutt		New Champions #2 (February 2025)
Fantasma	Isabella Alvarez	New Champions #2 (February 2025)
Gold Tiger	Abena Adebayo	New Champions #2 (February 2025)

=== Potential candidates ===
Individuals who were offered membership:

- Deadpool Boy
- Hulkette
- Kid Juggernaut
- Monte
- Nightshade
- Spider-Boy

== Reception ==
In January 2021, Bryce Morris of Screen Rant compared the lineup of Champions members with Avengers and X-Men members. He stated that after the expansion of membership in Champions (vol. 2) #16, Champions were no longer just a small team but an army of teenage superheroes similar to Avengers. Morris also commented on the expanding roster of Champions that each new addition to team only brings the mission closer to fruition, on which the second iteration of Champions was founded.
