= Espionage! =

1983 modern spy role-playing game

- Cover art by Mark Williams
- Designers: George MacDonald; Steve Peterson
- Illustrators: Michael Gray; Mark Williams; Stan Zarubin
- Publishers: Hero Games
- Publication: 1983
- Genres: Modern-day spies

Espionage!, subtitled "The Secret Agent Role Playing Game", is a spy role-playing game published by Hero Games in 1983.

== Description ==
Espionage! is a role-playing game set in the present day where players take on the roles of modern secret agents using the Hero System of rules first developed by Hero Games for their superhero role-playing game Champions.

The game uses the CIA as the sample espionage organization. In order to generate a character, the player must first decide on a general specialty such as covert action or technical services. The player then purchases skills from a list of several dozen, using a pool of skill points.

The boxed set includes a 64-page rule book, a 16-page sample adventure, and dice.

The rulebook covers character creation, skills, combat (melee and firearms), vehicles and car chases, and the CIA.

The tone of the game is very serious, and the rules, especially for combat, are somewhat complex.

The introductory scenario included with the game, "Merchants of Terror", is an adventure in which the heroes must track down a stolen atom bomb.

== Publication history ==
After Hero Games published their superhero role-playing game Champions in 1981, the same rules system was used to develop a second role-playing game, Espionage!, which was designed by George MacDonald and Steve Peterson, and was published in 1983 with cover art by Mark Williams, and interior art by Williams, Michael Gray, and Stan Zarubin.

Two years later, wanting to give Espionage! a lighter "movie spy" tone and less complex rules, Hero Games revised it and released the new game as Danger International.

== Reception ==
In Issue 31 of Different Worlds, Russell Grant Collins liked the rules taken from Champions, noting that this would make it easier for players to switch games without having to learn a new rules system, and noted "Since the systems are basically the same, Espionage! can be used as a supplement to Champions." But Collins questioned the use of the CIA, noting, "The main problem with this is that, being an actual group, some players might be more knowledgeable about them than the gamemaster. I would have preferred the creation of a fictional counterpart." Collins liked the sample adventure included in the game, calling it "very well done." He concluded with a strong recommendation, saying, "I recommend this game to anyone interested in a spy role-playing game. It is complete and great fun."

In Issue 27 of Abyss, Eric Olson liked the game, writing, "Espionage! seems to be better than any other [modern spy-oriented game] available." Olson also noted the emphasis on skills rather than weapons, saying, "The character becomes more than just a roll to hit. You form the character you want and an get a real personality without random restrictions." Olson concluded, "At this point it is probably the best spy-oriented role-playing game in the market."

W.G. Armintrout compared Top Secret, Espionage!, and Mercenaries, Spies and Private Eyes in Space Gamer No. 67. Armintrout commented that "Espionage! is the most complicated of the games, but once you master the rules I think it's the most satisfying of the three. It seems realistic. The parts that bog the game down are the turn phase rules (where all characters try to move at the same time) and the body/stun damage points rules (which work nicely but take time to allocate). The game also suffers from shoddy editing, with some rules left unclear and a lack of necessary examples. Nevertheless, I managed to figure it out and I'm going to keep playing it, if for no other reason than to try out the excellent CIA adventures I hope Hero Games will continue to produce."

Nick Davison reviewed Espionage for Imagine magazine, and stated that "This is a very good games system which is not as expensive as it seems given the full module included."

Marcus L. Rowland reviewed Espionage! for White Dwarf #54, giving it an overall rating of 8 out of 10, and stated that "I liked Espionage - it's easy to learn, fast, sensible, and has no obvious errors."

In his 1990 book The Complete Guide to Role-Playing Games, game critic Rick Swan found the rules poorly organized, making the task of generating a character more difficult than it should be. Swan also found the game mechanics difficult "though they produce realistic and exciting results for those willing to unravel them ... The complicated mechanics are likely to discourage casual players, and even veterans will be scratching their heads over some of the more ambiguous rules." Swan thought the tone of the game was "a little too serious for its own good. There are no tricky gadgets, fantastic weapons, colorful villains, or any of the other exotic elements that make James Bond so appealing." Swan concluded by giving the game a below-average rating of 2 out of 4, and recommended Espionage!'s descendant, Danger International, as a better game.
