= Southern Knights =

Comic Book

Publication information
- Publisher: Guild Publications; Comics Interview; Heroic Publishing; Critical Blast
- First appearance: Crusaders #1 (The Guild, Dec 1982)
- Created by: Henry Vogel, Audrey Vogel

In-story information
- Base(s): Hampton House, Atlanta Georgia
- Member(s): Electrode; Kristin; Connie; Dragon; Aramis

Southern Knights is a comic book created by the husband-and-wife team of Henry and Audrey Vogel. It chronicled the adventures of a superhero team based in Atlanta, Georgia. Initially known as "The Crusaders", they were renamed the Southern Knights with their second issue due to Archie Comics' Red Circle imprint having their own group called the Mighty Crusaders, though an in-context explanation is proffered in issue #2. Jackson Guice and Chuck Wojtkiewicz both made their comics debut on the series before going on to greater fame with other titles.

== Cast ==
=== Team members ===
- Electrode (David Shenk) — The leader of the group, a scientist whose love of comics motivated him to give himself super-powers. Can generate electricity—up to and including lightning bolts—and can fly. He often pressures the team into adopting superhero conventions such as wearing costumes and patrolling the city, but underneath such superficial pretensions, he is genuinely concerned with saving lives. He was named David after co-plotter/letterer David H. Willis, while Shenk was one of the authors of a calculus book that happened to be in proximity when Henry Vogel was devising a name.
- Connie Ronnin — A former Olympic fencing silver-medalist. She can create a 'psychic sword' which causes people struck by it to react as though it were a real sword, but leaves no lasting damage. Being a projection of psychic energy, her sword is not at all inhibited by armor. Though this is never revealed in the comics, creator Henry Vogel has stated that Connie's sword works through latent telepathic and telekinetic powers. Her powers were designed in part as a reaction to the large number of comics heroes who had swords but would only use them by bludgeoning enemies with the flat of the blade, due to concerns about glorifying lethal violence. By design, Connie's abilities allowed her to use her sword in the usual manner but without dismembering or killing her enemies.
- Kristin Austin — A petite Clemson University student who is strong enough to destroy a tank and tough enough to withstand at least .50 cal. machine gun rounds. Confident, outgoing, flirtatious, and hot-tempered, she's happy to put idiots in their place. Having had her powers since early childhood, she is comfortable with being superpowered and rarely hesitates to use her strength in public.
- Dragon (Moranderin/Mark Dagon) — The last of the dragons (or so he initially believes). After his mate and child were slain by men, he found that he could take on the form of a human male. After having his revenge on the slayer of his family, he wandered the world for a thousand years until meeting up with the Knights. In dragon form he is immensely strong and tough, can fly and breathe fire. In human form he is no tougher or stronger than a normal human. He was eventually featured in his own four-issue limited series, which chronicled several of his adventures from the centuries before the other Southern Knights were born.
- Aramis Merrow — A teenage sorcerer from the 18th century who was placed in suspended animation by his parents when their coven was attacked. He was awakened by Kristin and Connie while they were exploring the house the team had moved into. His magical powers include flight, scrying, summoning illusions, mystical shields, and bolts of magical energy. His major weakness is trying to adjust to modern-day life. The only non-founding member, he was introduced in issue #5. A running joke of the series is that despite his participating in nearly all of the Knights' missions, often playing the key role to their victories, he is persistently denied membership on the grounds that their work is too dangerous for someone his age. He is finally given official membership in issue #26. David H. Willis came up with the idea of Aramis.

The team's groundskeeper, Bryan Daniels, would sometimes don a high-tech suit of armor, designed by David Shenk, to help them out.

=== Enemies (Partial List) ===
- Franklin John Barl - A wealthy socialite, and neighbor to the Knights. After they rescued him, he became their official sponsor, but when he failed to relay crime reports, they publicly humiliated him in retaliation. The most frequently appearing villain of the series, he repeatedly threatens to get the team thrown out of the neighborhood, but this plot thread is never actually developed.
- Dread - A sociopath who has the mental power to draw forth a person's deepest fear and make it appear real to the victim. Dread appears in the series multiple times including the Morrigan Wars crossover with Heroic Publishing.
- Viper - A powerful criminal organization led initially by Serpent, then by Zephyr Flint, then by an unidentified man. (Not to be confused with the VIPER from Champions and League of Champions.)
- Carl and Larry - Two extremely talented hitmen who were initially hired to eliminate the Knights (issues 5–7). They later appeared in numerous back-up stories focusing on their unique way of delivering their services.
- Morrigan - A goddess who draws power from the sacrifice of living creatures who first appeared in issue 15. She was later the central character in the Southern Knights/League of Champions crossover titled the Morrigan Wars. It was a worshipper of Morrigan who slew Dragon's mate.

== Publication history ==
The superteam debuted in The Crusaders #1 (December 1982). The original creative team included three writers: co-creators Henry and Audrey Vogel and co-plotter/letterer David H. Willis. The team was filled out by Jackson Guice on both pencils and inks, though Guice would be penciling only on Southern Knights #2 and gone entirely after that. Guice's original design sketch of the titular superhero team was used as the cover to Southern Knights #2. The series was published quarterly at first by the Guild, a company founded by Willis and Henry Vogel for the sole purpose of publishing the series. Initially artists came and went in quick succession, but with issue #5 penciler Chuck Wojtkiewicz and inker Steve Kent came on as the steady art team. According to Vogel, throughout the Guild era each issue of Southern Knights took in just enough money to fund the printing of the next issue.

Most of the stories were created using the Marvel method: A 3-4 page plot was written for each issue, then the issue was penciled from this plot, and the script was written based on photocopied pages of the penciled art.

Vogel and Willis began to feel out of their depth with comic book publishing and wanted to focus solely on the creative side of Southern Knights, so after issue #6 they began searching for a new publisher for the series. They first submitted Southern Knights to First Comics, which politely rejected it. When Henry Vogel mentioned the situation to David Anthony Kraft, with whom he had struck up a friendship a few years before, Kraft told him that he had been thinking about expanding his company Comics Interview (which had previously only published magazines) into comics, and would like to publish Southern Knights. Following a half-year's hiatus for Southern Knights, issue #8 was released under its new publisher Comics Interview, a new bi-monthly publication schedule, and a new tagline: "The #1 Super Team of the South", which was Kraft's idea.

However, the success of the Knights was mixed with creative turnover. Issue #8 was also the last issue to feature Audrey Vogel as writer (though several later issues of the series credit her as "story consultant"). According to Henry Vogel, she gradually fell out of writing the series due to working a full-time job. Willis left two issues after, leaving Henry Vogel to write the series by himself. Southern Knights gradually became less oriented on long-term plot threads and increasingly consisted of short story arcs and single-issue stories. Wojtkiewicz left after issue #11, and with issue #12 Mark Propst began penciling the Knights. The art for issues #17 through #34 was provided by a number of artists including Propst, Willie Peppers, Marc Lamport, Don Hillsman, Wojtkiewicz, and others.

In the late 80's, the popularity of the team led to the Dragon miniseries (penciled by Peppers) and numerous Southern Knights spin-offs, mostly reprints. For instance, a "Dread Halloween Special" was a reprint of Southern Knights #14, and a three-issue Aramis limited series was a reprinting of select Aramis appearances from issues #5-26, with brief textual segues. The Southern Knights also guest-starred in Aristocratic Xtraterrestrial Time-Traveling Thieves (vol.2) #1. According to Henry Vogel, this was the Southern Knights' best-selling appearance, since at the time Aristocratic Xtraterrestrial Time-Traveling Thieves was selling better than Southern Knights.

In 1989 the black-and-white comics market collapsed, and as a result Southern Knights was canceled with issue #33 (June 1989), though a Christmas issue was published at the end of the year as Southern Knights #34.

From 1986 to 1989 Comics Interview released a series of collections of the title. Rather than being comic-sized reprints like the soon-to-be standard trade paperback, these collections were 8 1/2" by 11":

- Southern Knights Graphic Novel (1986): Reprints Crusaders #1 & Southern Knights #2
- Early Days of the Southern Knights #2 (1986): Reprints issues #3-5
- Early Days of the Southern Knights #3 (1986): Reprints issues #6-7
- Early Days of the Southern Knights #4 (1987): (titled Origins of the Southern Knights on the cover) Reprints issues #8 and the Southern Knights: Special Report one-shot
- Early Days of the Southern Knights #5 (1987): Reprints issues #9-11
- Early Days of the Southern Knights #6 (1988): Reprints issues #12-14
- Early Days of the Southern Knights #7 (1988): Reprints issues #15-16
- Early Days of the Southern Knights #8 (1989): Reprints issues #17-19

=== Revivals ===
In 1992 the series was revived for a crossover with Heroic Publishing's League of Champions (issues #5-8) and Flare (issues #8 and 9), titled "The Morrigan Wars". Parts two and five were published as Southern Knights #35 and 36, and both the Knights themselves and their supporting cast figured prominently throughout the crossover. Though all the installments are credited as being co-written by Vogel, his role was limited to the crossover's plot; the scripting was done solely by Flare/League of Champions writer/editor Dennis Mallonee, who also co-plotted the crossover with Vogel. Propst, having since become regular artist on Flare, inked most of the crossover. Mallonee expressed hope that Heroic would be able to continue the series beyond the crossover, but interest proved insufficient, and Southern Knights #36 is the final issue to date.

Heroic Publishing again spoke of running new Southern Knights stories during the mid-2000s, with Vogel and Propst as the creative team, but these never materialized. Mallonee later revealed that Vogel had submitted a plot and Propst had produced some art, but the project was not completed for various reasons. In 2010, Heroic reprinted "The Morrigan Wars", with color added, in Champions #47-50 and Flare Adventures #27-28. This was the first time any of the Southern Knights' adventures were published in color.

In an August 3, 2024 interview, Henry Vogel said that he would like to do more Southern Knights stories, but lack of funds with which to hire artists prevented him from doing so. Vogel is writing prose Southern Knights stories, the first of which will appear in Legends of Indie Comics - Words Only, edited by Robert T. Jeschonek.

In December 2024 Critical Blast Publishing released Southern Knights: Almost Complete Collection, a hardcover book reprinting the entire series and the Dragon limited series. It includes previously unpublished artwork, including 11 pages from an issue of Southern Knights which was in mid-production when the series was cancelled. They reprinted "The Morrigan Wars" as a separate volume with two variant covers, one for Southern Knights and one for League of Champions.
