= Danger International =

1985 espionage role-playing game

Cover art by Denis Loubet

Danger International is a modern-day role-playing game published by Hero Games in 1985.

== Description ==
Danger International is a role-playing game in which players can take on the roles of spies, private eyes, investigative reporters, and paramilitary mercenaries, in adventures that can be set anywhere from the 1940s to the present day.

This game uses the universal Hero System of rules developed by Hero Games for their superhero role-playing game Champions and thus it is compatible with all Hero Games RPGs such as Champions and Justice, Inc.

Combat has both quick, basic rules and slower, more detailed advanced rules. The game includes rules for concealment, vehicle combat, modern equipment, and the modern political world.

Three introductory scenarios are included — one solo adventure, one martial arts group scenario titled "Night of the Ninja", and one anti-terrorism scenario.

== Publication history ==
Hero Games first developed the universal Hero System in the early 1980s, which was subsequently used in all of their role-playing games. One of these games was Espionage!: The Secret Agent Role Playing Game (1983), where players took on the role of modern-day spies as portrayed in the TV series Mission: Impossible.

Two years later, L. Douglas Garrett, George MacDonald and Steve Peterson expanded the rules of Espionage! so that players could take on a variety of roles besides spies, and the game could be set in various time periods after World War II. The designers also moved away from the very serious tone of Espionage!, taking what game critic Rick Swan called "the entertaining approach."

The result was Danger International, a 176-page softcover book with cover art by Denis Loubet, and interior art by Steve Borelli, Charles Pickens, Scott Ruggels, and Carolyn Schultz-Savoy.

The adventure Here There Be Tigers was co-written by Kevin Dockery and published by Firebird Ltd., while Hero Games and Iron Crown Enterprises co-published the adventure S.H.A.D.O.W. over Scotland in 1986.

== Here There Be Tigers ==
Cover of Here There Be Tigers

The Here There Be Tigers supplement and adventure was published by Firebird Ltd. in 1986. The 80-page book is designed by Kevin Dockery and Robert Schroeder with artwork by Kevin Pogue and David Welling.

The first part of Here There Be Tigers provides more in-depth details on creating military commando-type characters for Danger International, including new base packages, information on military training, and weapons.

The second part of the book is an adventure in which a group of Vietnam veterans is privately recruited to undertake a mission into Laos to rescue a group of American prisoners of war (POWs).

== Reception ==
In Issue 44 of Different Worlds, Chris Osborne found that, "Danger International is one of the most comprehensive and realistic games I have ever reviewed." However, Osborne warned "The process of character generation and learning to use the skills and combat systems is definitely time consuming." Osborne noted that "Danger International is made more intriguing because of its compatibility with other games [made by other publishers such as] Twilight: 2000, Mercenaries, Spies and Private Eyes, and Call of Cthulhu." Osborne concluded by giving the game a rating of 3.5 out of 4, saying, "Danger International is a comprehensive, realistic, and flexible system that suffers only minimally from an over-complicated presentation that could easily be fixed in a second edition. Even though the presentation is slightly awkward at times the merits of the game make Danger International the best game for this genre that | have seen to date."

In Issue 37 of the French games magazine Casus Belli, Yann Soitin compared the tone of the game to James Bond and Magnum P.I.. Soitin found the rules, although dense, were an improvement over Espionage!, and noted that "this large book also contains multiple lists of weapons, vehicles and various objects, types of scenarios and other advice, and a scenario. It is therefore, in a single volume, a very complete game." Soitin concluded, "An interesting game therefore, although not recommended for beginners."

In his 1990 book The Complete Guide to Role-Playing Games, game critic Rick Swan thought the lighter tone of this game made it more fun than its predecessor, Espionage! He noted that skills are heavily combat-oriented "but then the violence is basically what Danger International is all about." Swan concluded by giving the game a rating of 3 out of 4.
