= Transpower =

Transpower may refer to:

- Transpower New Zealand, a transmission system operator in New Zealand
- Transpower Stromübertragungs GmbH, a subsidiary of TenneT, a transmission system operator in Germany
- Transpower (character), a fictional superhero of League of Champions
