= Champions II =

Role-playing game supplement

- Cover art by Stan Woch
- Designers: Bruce Harlick
- Illustrators: Stan Woch; Mark Williams
- Publishers: Hero Games
- Publication: 1982
- Genres: Superhero

Champions II is a supplement published by Hero Games in 1982 for the superhero role-playing game Champions.

== Contents ==
Champions II, the first rules supplement for Champions, presents new superhero skills and powers for characters, as well as innovations on the combat system for the game. It also provides guidelines on how to design headquarters and vehicles. Short pieces describe topics such as ordinary people, non-player characters, experience points, superheroes and the law, money, and a piece called "Campaigning Champions" by Aaron Allston.

== Publication history ==
Hero Games published the superhero role-playing game Champions in 1981. The following year, they published the game's first supplement, Champions II, written by Bruce Harlick, with cover art by Stan Woch and interior art by Mark Williams. This would be followed by Champions III in 1984.

== Reception ==
In The Space Gamer No. 62, Allen Varney commented that "there's much here of interest, lasting or not. The record sheets alone go a long way toward justifying the price." Varney concluded, "Champions II is definitely worth having, if not quite indispensable."

In Issue 30 of Different Worlds, Russell Grant Collins stated, "Everything introduced in this supplement is billed as optional. If you are satisfied with the Champions that you are already playing, there is not a great deal of reason to buy this book. If, however, even a couple of the areas mentioned above interest you, I think that you will find a lot of value in this product."

In Issue 33 of Abyss, Lew Bryson called the contents "mostly good", especially the vehicle construction segment. He also noted "Especially appreciated are the new skills and powers, which included some which are absolutely necessary." Bryson concluded, "This one is worth the price."

In the British RPG magazine Imagine, Pete Tamlyn commented, "Champions players [...] will probably be interested in useful new rule systems. Champions II is quite good in this respect, covering a lot of stuff that doubtless got squeezed out of the initial book by all the character design material. Designing your own hideouts and vehicles is covered, as are character income, encounter charts and legal implications of superheroing."
