= Joaquin Torres =

Joaquin Torres may refer to:

- Joaquín Torres (footballer) (born 1997), Argentinian footballer
- Joaquín Torres-García (1874–1949), Spanish-Uruguayan artist
- Joaquin Torres (comics), a Marvel Comics character
  - Joaquin Torres (Marvel Cinematic Universe), a version of the character
