= S.H.A.D.O.W. over Scotland =

S.H.A.D.O.W. over Scotland is a 1986 role-playing game adventure published by Hero Games/Iron Crown Enterprises for Danger International.

== Plot summary ==
S.H.A.D.O.W. over Scotland is an adventure in which a several related murders and disappearances occur near an ancient castle located on an island off the coast of Scotland.

== Publication history ==
S.H.A.D.O.W. over Scotland was written by Derek Mathias with a cover by Denis Loubet and published by Hero Games/Iron Crown Enterprises in 1987 as a 48-page book.
