= Heroic Publishing =

American comic book publisher

- Predecessor: Hero Comics; Hero Graphics
- Founded: 1987; 39 years ago
- Founder: Dennis Mallonee
- Headquarters location: Long Beach, California
- Publication types: Comic books
- Fiction genres: Superhero
- Official website: www.heroicmultiverse.com/heroicpub

Heroic Publishing, previously known as Hero Comics and Hero Graphics, is an American comic book publisher founded by Dennis Mallonee.

In the late 1980s and early 1990s, the company published about 100 superhero comics issues across several series, the most prolific of which featured the League of Champions and other characters associated with the Champions role-playing game. Heroic Publishing returned to the marketplace in 2004, and in 2006 introduced one of its most popular characters, Liberty Girl. In 2007 financial difficulties forced Heroic Publishing to stop regular publication of its titles, producing new issues as funds became available. Currently Heroic publishes via print-on-demand, distributing both physical copies and electronic editions.

Heroic Publishing has never employed in-house creators, so although Mallonee writes a narrow majority of the stories himself, the company's content is largely produced by freelance writers and artists. However, many of these freelancers have been repeatedly retained by Heroic Publishing over a long period of time, in many cases spanning the hiatuses from publishing. Creators associated with the company include Dell Barras, Mark Beachum, Howard Bender, Tim Burgard, E. R. Cruz, Dærick Gröss Sr., Rick Hoberg, Chris Marrinan, Steve Perrin, Gordon Purcell, Roy Thomas, and J. Adam Walters.

== History ==
=== Hero Comics ===
In 1986, comics writer Dennis Mallonee licensed characters from the tabletop superhero role-playing game Champions for a comic book limited series he wrote, which was published by Eclipse Comics. (Note: Marvel Comics had published a Champions comic book series from 1975 to 1978. Hero Games' use of the name for its RPG initiated a dispute with Marvel. In 1988, The United States Patent and Trademark Office ruled that Marvel had abandoned its trademark of the name and could no longer use "The Champions" as the name of a comic book series. Marvel later re-acquired rights to the trademark, publishing a new The Champions series in 2016.) That same year, he co-created (with artist Rick Hoberg) and wrote the series Eternity Smith for Renegade Press.

Eclipse Comics were uninterested in Mallonee's ambition to make Champions an ongoing series, and Renegade Press asked Mallonee to release them from the last issue of their six-issue contract because they no longer felt Eternity Smith fit in with the Renegade lineup, so founding Hero Comics, Mallonee struck out on his own. Other staff at Hero Comics included vice president David Berge, who remains with the company as of 2025, and secretary Gavin Claypool. Hero Comics' first titles were an ongoing Champions series, The Marksman, Eternity Smith (restarting the numbering to #1, despite the first issue being the conclusion to a story arc begun with Renegade), and Captain Thunder and Blue Bolt, written by Marvel Comics veterans Roy and Dann Thomas. All four titles debuted with September 1987 cover dates, except for The Marksman, which was held off four months to allow readers to vote for which Champion would get a solo series. Mallonee later admitted that four months was not nearly enough lead time to develop, produce, and publish the first issue of a new series, and that in fact the hands-down winner of the poll was Flare, not the Marksman. Hero Comics launched a Flare series in 1988.

Flare was an immediate big seller, but by the time its first issue hit stands Hero Comics had had to cancel all of its series except Flare and Champions, a turn of events which Mallonee has attributed to his inexperience as a publisher at the time. Despite the success of Flare, for distribution reasons it was not viable for a publisher to put out just one comic book, so with Champions struggling, Hero Comics had no choice but to close its doors by the end of 1988.

=== Partnership with Innovation Comics ===
After taking a short break from publishing, Mallonee, Berge, and Claypool re-entered the marketplace in 1990 as Hero Graphics, co-publishing a handful of issues of Flare, The League of Champions (a retitled Champions), and a new series, The Adventures of Chrissie Claus, with David Campiti's Innovation Comics, which also served as the company's distributor. During this period every issue was in a deluxe 52-page format, and most included multiple stories. Hero Graphics planned to continue all three series themselves following the conclusion of their contract with Innovation, but again, only Flare had the sales to merit continued publication. Hero put out three more issues of Flare before they were again forced to end operations in 1991.

=== Black-and-white era ===
This time Hero was on hiatus for less than a year, as the black-and-white comics boom provided a new path for the company to remain financially viable. Hero Graphics resumed publication of all three titles from the Innovation era, revived Captain Thunder and Blue Bolt, and introduced a number of new series, most of them featuring characters associated with Champions, and all of them published in black-and-white. As Mallonee's company evolved, it became more centered on depicting attractive pinups. Hero Games, the original licensor of Champions, became increasingly uncomfortable with these changes in tone, and some of the characters' owners pulled Mallonee's licensing rights, forcing him to rename the characters. For instance, Bruce Harlick's Marksman became Huntsman, and Harlick's Foxbat became The Flying Fox.

Icestar and Flare's rights' owners, Gleen Thain and Stacy Lawrence, respectively, allowed Heroic to continue using their characters. Mallonee was also the creator of some of the Champions characters he had been using, such as Doctor Arcane, and thus was free to continue using them. Over the years, Mallonee developed many original characters as well, slowly pushing his comics further from Hero Games' Champions universe. (To avoid confusion, Hero Games removed creator-owned characters that were still being used by Mallonee from new editions of their products.)

Mallonee rebranded the company again in 1992, as Heroic Publishing. By late 1992, however, Heroic Publishing was in the red, offering retailers deep discounts on their titles. The company effectively suspended publishing in late 1993/early 1994.

=== 2004 return ===
Heroic returned to publishing again in 2004, starting off with just one comic book a month: a new semi-monthly Flare series and a quarterly The Black Enchantress to fill in the remaining months. Both were in full color, and aside from the original edition of the one-shot Heather Reilly, Heroic Publishing has never gone back to black-and-white comics, with even reprints of stories from the black-and-white era having color added. The new Flare was a critical and commercial success, encouraging Heroic Publishing to resume a number of series from its earlier eras, including Champions, Murcielaga She-Bat, and Tigress. It also introduced a number of new series, including Liberty Girl, which in addition to having strong sales enticed a number of star creators to contribute stories from the title character's World War II-era past.

In 2007 financial difficulties forced Heroic Publishing to end regular publication of all of their series. With severely limited funds with which to pay creators, issues have been published only sporadically, and many of these issues are simply reprinted material pushed out in order to maintain trademarks on the characters. For instance, among Champions #43-67, issues #43, 47-50, 52, 56, and 65 all consist entirely of reprints, and only issues 53, 63, and 64 consist solely of new material. Liberty Girl continued to use only new stories, but is also a particularly strong example of the sporadic publication of Heroic comics since 2007: Issue #3 was published in 2007, #4 in 2012, #5 in 2020, and #6 in 2025. Even during this uncertain period, however, Heroic introduced a new and relatively popular series, The Sensational G-Girl.

The company moved on to publishing print-on-demand, distributing both physical copies and electronic editions. In 2024 Heroic Publishing launched a YouTube channel called The Heroic Voice, on which Mallonee conducts interviews with comics creators he has worked with, other figures in the comics industry, and occasionally people outside the comics industry. The channel also includes "Flip-Thru!" episodes in which vice president David Berge shows the contents of Heroic Publishing's latest comics.

== Titles (selected) ==
=== First phase, 1987–1994 ===
- The Adventures of Chrissie Claus (2 issues, May 1991 and January 1994)
- Captain Thunder and Blue Bolt (12 issues, Sep 1987–Sep 1988; Aug 1992-Nov 1992) — written by Roy and Dann Thomas, most issues drawn by E. R. Cruz and/or Dell Barras
- Champions vol. 2 (12 regular issues and 2 annuals, Sep 1987–Oct 1988) — written by Dennis Mallonee, penciled by Chris Marrinan, inked by Dell Barras; continuing 1986 series acquired from Eclipse Comics
- Champions Classics / Flare Adventures (15 issues, Feb 1992–July 1993) — reprint series with bonus new material usually written by Dennis Mallonee
- Eternity Smith vol. 2 (9 issues, Sep 1987–Aug 1988) — continuing 1986 series acquired from Renegade Press, written by Dennis Mallonee and penciled by Rick Hoberg; inkers include E. R. Cruz and Jimmy Janes
- Flare vol. 1 and 2 (19 issues, Nov 1988–Feb 1994) — contributors include Dennis Mallonee, Mark Beachum, Mark Propst, Howard Simpson
- Flare First Edition (11 issues, June 1991–Oct 1993) — reprint series which incorporated new stories from issue #5 forward; contributors include Mark Beachum and Dennis Mallonee
- Icicle (5 issues, July 1992–July 1993) — written by Dennis Mallonee, drawn by Lou Manna
- Lady Arcane (4 issues, July 1992–Apr 1993) — written by Dennis Mallonee, drawn by Duval Stowers
- League of Champions (12 issues, Dec 1990–July 1993) — continuation of Champions vol. 2; most issues written by Dennis Mallonee; backup stories written by Dærick Gröss Sr.
- The Marksman (5 regular issues and 1 annual, Jan 1988-Dec 1988) — written by Steve Perrin, penciled by Pete McDonnell, inked by Jeff Albrecht; backup stories written by Dennis Mallonee
- Murcielaga She-Bat (2 issues, Jan–Apr 1993) — by Dærick Gröss Sr.; Studio G published issues #3-7 in the mid-1990s
- Rose (5 issues, Dec 1992–Dec 1993) — written by Dennis Mallonee; drawn by Mark Beachum and Peter Worth
- Southern Knights (2 issues, Sep 1992-Nov 1992) — co-published with Comics Interview; written by Dennis Mallonee and Henry Vogel, inked by Mark Propst
- Sparkplug (2 issues, Mar and May 1993) — written by Lou Mougin, penciled by Scott Clark and Henry Martinez, inked by J. David Spurlock and Rob Lansley
- Tigress (6 issues, Aug 1992–June 1993) — written by Dennis Mallonee, penciled by Paul Abrams, inked by Craig A. Stormon

=== Second phase, 2004–present ===
- Alter Ego: The Graphic Novel (2005) — collecting the limited series of the same name by Roy Thomas and Ron Harris and originally published by First Comics (ISBN 978-0929729022)
- Alter Ego: 25th Anniversary Edition (April 2011-present) — renamed Alter Ego after it switched from reprints of the First Comics series to new material; written by Roy and Dann Thomas, drawn by Ron Harris
- Anthem (Mar 2006-present) — written by Roy Thomas, drawn by Benito Gallego
- The Black Enchantress (Jan 2005-present) — written by Dennis Mallonee (sometimes under the pseudonym Wilson Hill), drawn by J. Adam Walters and Gordon Purcell
- Champions vol. 3 (Aug 2005–present) — anthology series; contributors include Dennis Mallonee, Chris Marrinan, Dick Giordano, and J. Adam Walters
- Champions Adventures (16 issues, Mar 2011–July 2018) — originally a reprint series, but has incorporated new stories starting with issue #4
- Flare vol. 3 (29 issues, Nov 2004–Feb 2019) — written by Dennis Mallonee (sometimes under the pseudonym Wilson Hill), drawn by Gordon Purcell, Terry Pallot, and Giancarlo Caracuzzo; backup stories written by Steve Perrin
- Flare Adventures (19 issues, June 2005–Mar 2012) — reprint series which occasionally uses new stories
- Heroic Spotlight (26 issues, Mar 2010–Feb 2017) — combination reprint and anthology series; new serials include Fantastic Girl, written by Dennis Mallonee, drawn by Francesco Gerbino
- The Infinites (7 issues, Aug 2011-Dec 2014) — written by David William Daniel Thomas, drawn by Chris Hanchey and Francesco Gerbino
- League of Champions (16 issues, Dec 2009-Sep 2022) — written by Dennis Mallonee, most issues drawn by Ulderico Fioretti or Henry Martinez
- Liberty Comics (11 issues, June 2007–July 2020) — anthology series
- Liberty Girl (June 2006-present) — written by Dennis Mallonee, drawn by Mark Sparacio and Chris Marrinan
- Murcielaga She-Bat (12 issues, Mar 2010-Mar 2021) — reprint series; Heroic Publishing published issues #1-2 in 1993, Studio G published issues #3-7 in the mid-1990s
- The Sensational G-Girl (Mar 2016-present) — written by Dennis Mallonee; artists include Gaetano Petrigno, Dell Barras, and Henry Martinez
- Sparkplug (1 issue, Apr 2009) — written by Lou Mougin, penciled by Henry Martinez, inked by Jeff Brennan
- Tigress (7 issues, Aug 2016-July 2023) — written by Dennis Mallonee, drawn by Oski Yañez
- Witchgirls Inc. (13 issues, Sep 2005–Sep 2019) — split-book series featuring The Black Enchantress and Psyche; written by Dennis Mallonee (sometimes under the pseudonym Wilson Hill), J. Adam Walters, and Terrance Griep, Jr.; drawn by J. Adam Walters, Chris Marrinan, and David Gross
