= Captain America and the Falcon =

American comic book series

Captain America and the Falcon is a title used by multiple American comic books published by Marvel Comics featuring the superheroes Captain America and Falcon. It was used as the cover title for Captain America's ongoing comic book series from 1971 to 1978, and was the title of a limited series written by Christopher Priest that ran from 2004 to 2005.

== 1971 ongoing series ==
Although never the official title, the ongoing comic series Captain America was cover titled Captain America and the Falcon from issue #134 (dated February 1971) to issue #222 (dated June 1978).

== 2004 limited series ==
Captain America and the Falcon
- Cover to Captain America and the Falcon #10; Art by Howard Porter

Publication information
- Publisher: Marvel Comics
- Schedule: Monthly
- Format: Ongoing series
- Publication date: May 2004 - June 2005
- No. of issues: Fourteen
- Main character(s): Captain America; Falcon

Creative team
- Written by: Christopher Priest
- Penciller(s): Bart Sears; Joe Bennett; Andrea Di Vito; Greg Tocchini; Dan Jurgens
- Inker(s): Rob Hunter; Jack Jadson; Scott Koblish; Oclair Albert; Tom Palmer
- Colorist: Mike Atiyeh

A fourteen issue limited series titled Captain America and the Falcon was published by Marvel from 2004 to 2005. All fourteen issues were written by Christopher Priest, with the artwork duties passing to a number of different groupings. The artists with the two most prominent runs were Bart Sears and Joe Bennett.

=== Publication history ===
The idea to begin publishing Captain America and the Falcon began with Marvel editor Tom Brevoort. Captain America's solo title had been restarted in 2002 as a part of the Marvel Knights imprint. This resulted in a situation in which the character's then current solo stories were no longer taking place within Marvel's main shared universe, the Marvel Universe. Captain America and the Falcon was meant to fill the gap created by this situation.

Problems began almost immediately, problems Priest would later admit were created by both himself and Bart Sears:

I was thinking that the readers and the company would both have enough patience with us and enough confidence in me as a writer to enjoy the ride and not demand instant gratification. I really believe readers are far less patient now than ever, and that fans love to play Cancellation Roulette and, so, tend to avoid perfectly healthy comic books the fan press have labeled as failures.

Complicating things even more was, initially, artist Bart Sears’ storytelling approach. Now, Bart is A Name, and his agreeing to work on CAF was greeted with elation, first and foremost by me. We have Bart to thank for CAF’s strong launch, as the book was (likely) entirely sold on Bart’s Name.

But many fans took an instant dislike to Bart’s style—everybody was hulking the anatomical proportions were comically extreme—and most everyone was completely lost by the first issue’s story, which was my fault. I’d designed a first issue where Cap seems to be acting out of character, intercut with apparent flashbacks to events leading up to this behavior. At the end of the issue, however, it is revealed that "Cap" is not the real Captain America, and that the flashbacks weren’t flashbacks at all but were cutaway sequences occurring within the same time frame.

That was a dicey choice on my part, but we had clear directions and time signatures inserted. A savvy reader could (and should have) realized, somewhere in the first issue, that they were looking at two different Caps.

Only, Bart chose a page layout design that utterly confused even the most basic storytelling and completely derailed this dicey misdirect. Ignoring instructions and warnings about how important it was to keep the lines straight and clear, Bart chose to insert—for no apparent reason—poster-shot images of Captain American and the Falcon on most every page. Accommodating these required the other panels to be modified, reduced or eliminated altogether, making the pages very hard to follow. I wrote the thing and didn’t have an earthly clue what was going on.

Christopher J. Priest, January 2, 2006

The death blow for Captain America and the Falcon came when Captain America's solo series was once again relaunched in 2005. With sales dropping and the series very reason for existing now gone, Marvel canceled Captain America and the Falcon with issue #14.

The fourteen issues of Captain America and the Falcon were broken up into various storyarcs. The first storyarc, titled "Two Americas" was contained within the first four issues. The next three issues (numbered #5, 6 and 7) were tie-in issues for the Avengers Disassembled crossover. The Avengers Disassembled crossover issues were followed by the five part (issues #8-12) "Brothers & Keepers" storyarc and the two part (issues #13 and 14) "American Psycho" storyarc.

=== "Anti-Cap" ===
The main supporting character around which most of the storylines in Captain America and the Falcon revolved was known as the "Anti-Cap." The name "Anti-Cap" for this character comes from a line in issue #2:

..its not just that the guy looks like you. He outran a humvee and put twelve marines in the hospital. Sit room's calling him the "Anti-Cap."

— S.H.I.E.L.D. agent Ali Morales to Captain America

The character's name was never revealed, with this nickname becoming his de facto name.

"Anti-Cap" is a Navy SEAL operative of the Office of Naval Intelligence. He first attempted to join the United States armed forces after his girlfriend was killed in the Oklahoma City bombing, but was rejected for health reasons. After this failure he was recruited by the O.N.I. in order to take part in a black op program designed to create a secret super operative to be used exclusively by the O.N.I.

His superhuman strength and endurance comes from a drug named acetovaxidol which is regulated in his system via a computer grafted to his spine. Acetovaxidol is a drug that had appeared previously in the Marvel Universe as the source of Luke Cage's powers. Unlike Cage's constant internal supply, "Anti-Cap" gets his acetovaxidol via skin patches. Without the fixes these patches give him, "Anti-Cap" would lapse in possibly fatal withdrawal symptoms.

=== Plot synopsis ===
The first issue opens in the middle of a crisis. The Falcon has broken Leila Davis, an American journalist he has a past relationship with, out of the Guantanamo Bay detention camp. A figure the reader later learns to be "Anti-Cap" is in Cuba searching for the Falcon. He eventually finds him, taking shelter in the compound of the Rivas Family, a drug cartel with CIA connections. While this is happening, Captain America attempts to find out why Leila Davis was arrested. Not finding any answers, he leaves for Cuba to help his partner.

Having captured Leila Davis and the Falcon, "Anti-Cap" steals a cargo plane from the Guantanamo Bay Naval Base and begins to fly it back to the United States. Somewhere over the Straits of Florida this plane collides with the plane that has Captain America and the Scarlet Witch aboard. The occupants of the two planes escape unharmed and make their way back to dry land. The Falcon, Leila Davis and "Anti-Cap" end up in Florida. Captain America is teleported to Cuba by the Scarlet Witch who then leaves to return to the United States. Captain America then rendezvous with S.H.I.E.L.D. agent Ali Morales who gives him all of S.H. I.E.L.D.'s known information on "Anti-Cap".

"Anti-Cap" is found washed up in Miami Beach by two rescue workers. He kills them and takes their vehicle. In Cuba, Captain America and Morales journey to the Rivas Family compound. There they discover what Leila Davis found and what caused her to be locked up in the Guantanamo Bay detention camp taped to the back of the Falcon's Avengers ID and hidden behind a toilet. Its true nature isn't revealed to the reader, but it is described as "World War III in a petri dish." It is also mentioned that "by itself, its harmless." The Captain and Morales then fly to Miami. In that city, the Falcon and Leila take refuge with some of the Falcon's old gang associates. "Anti-Cap" quickly finds them and attacks. Just as he is about to kill the Falcon, Captain America rushes in to save his partner.

After a brief confrontation in which "Anti-Cap" holds the Falcon hostage, "Anti-Cap" flees. Captain America tracks "Anti-Cap" through a hurricane now raging over Miami. At this point information on the analysis of a DNA sample from "Anti-Cap" obtained in Cuba arrives. With the discovery of acetovaxidol as the source of "Anti-Cap"'s powers, a plan to stop him is made. This plan turn out to be successful. Days later Captain America meets with Nick Fury and Admiral Jimmy Westbrook - the man behind the project that created the "Anti-Cap." At this meeting Captain America refuses to reveal where he has hidden either the "Anti-Cap," or "WWIII in a petri dish."

Captain America and the Falcon battle a group of armed men, hired by the Rivas for revenge, outside of Captain America's civilian apartment. They are rescued by the Scarlet Witch in a taxi. While this is happening Admiral Westbrook and Nick Fury meet to discuss recent events surrounding Captain America, the Falcon and the "Anti-Cap." Meanwhile, Captain America and the Falcon journey to Luke Cage's Harlem apartment in order to obtain a sample of the acetovaxidol from his blood stream. They wish to use this to synthesize acetovaxidol to stave off the withdrawal "Anti-Cap" is facing. Having obtained this they go to the Wakandan consulate in New York City where they have hidden the "Anti-Cap." After this they go to confront Fury and Westbrook.

Chaos erupts at the meeting after the Falcon shoots Westbrook, who is saved by the bulletproof vest he is wearing. This chaos is briefly stopped when the Scarlet Witch arrives with Hank Pym to reveal his final analysis of "WWIII in a Petri dish." He says that it isn't a bio-weapon, but is instead DNA, his exact word being, "It's... an old friend of yours..." Captain America and the Falcon flee with the Falcon leading Westbrook's forces away to allow his partner to make his way back to the Wakandan consulate and the "Anti-Cap." While the two main characters make their way through the streets of New York, a man named Damocles Rivas arrives offering a deal to Westbrook.

The Falcon confronts Leila Davis to warn her that the Rivas might be coming for her. As they talk, Captain America confronts feelings he is having for the Scarlet Witch, feelings which are a direct connection to events in the Avengers Disassembled crossover. Issue #7 ends with a man waking up in the Rivas family compound in Montclair, New Jersey. He puts on an AIM helmet, opens a secret door and steps into a room containing MODOK.

People in various places around the world begin to see visions of MODOK, visions that prove to be fatal for the observer. As this is happening Captain America and the Falcon are confronting the Rivas directly. Captain America fights with agents of the Drug Enforcement Administration in Colombia. Among the Rivas, he encounters a Navy SEAL on a secret mission for Westbrook. Meanwhile, the Falcon confronts money launderers working for the Rivas in New York's Chinatown. They return from these missions to the Wakandan consulate to talk with the "Anti-Cap." After they leave, "Anti-Cap" finds a note on the floor of his cell that says "Bite Me." He later collapses with the consulate staff declaring him dead from a stroke.

Captain America and Admiral Westbrook meet for "Anti-Cap"'s burial at sea aboard the aircraft carrier, U.S.S. Kirby. Afterward, divers appear to retrieve the coffin. They are fought off by the Falcon who raises to the surface with "Anti-Cap" and flies away. Hours later "Anti-Cap" wakes up in a Harlem apartment. His conversation with the Falcon reveals to the reader that the "Bite Me" note contained a paralytic enzyme that helped to fake "Anti-Cap"'s death. With help from Nick Fury and Ali Morales, Cap, the Falcon and "Anti-Cap" make plans for an infiltration and attack on the U.S.S. Saisha, Westbrook's personal yacht where he and Damocles Rivas are having a meeting as well as Damocles Rivas' Montclair compound.

In the Rivas Compound, Captain America discovers MODOK. After a brief confrontation MODOK stands down, allowing Captain America to put on a nearby AIM helmet he thinks is a controlling unit. This guess proves to be correct and he soon discovers that the people MODOK has killed around the world are all ex-agents of AIM and that MODOK has been doing this instinctively—the majority of his mind being elsewhere. Meanwhile, "Anti-Cap" finds and confronts Westbrook aboard the Saisha, but Westbrook reveals a device by which he can shut down "Anti-Cap"'s ability to move via the computer grafted to his spine. The Falcon arrives just in time to knock out Westbrook and save the "Anti-Cap." They are both rendered unconscious by Damocles Rivas, whose head now looks similar to MODOK.

Conversations in issue #11 reveal to the reader that "WWIII in a petri dish" is made of modified DNA taken from MODOK, that this was designed to kill him, that Westbrook was using this to control MODOK and that the mind and sentience of MODOK now resides within the body of Damocles Rivas. From a secret AIM base MODOK in Damocles Rives' body holds the Falcon and "Anti-Cap" hostage. Before he can make his demands fully known Captain America manipulates the conversation in such a way that brings Damocles Rivas' mind partially to the surface to fight MODOK. The resulting mental fight allows the Falcon and "Anti-Cap" to free themselves. "Anti-Cap" then shoots and kills Damocles Rivas' body shunting both minds into MODOK's body where the fight for control continues. During this fight MODOK's body is injected with the modified DNA. MODOK reveals at this point that he mentally manipulated Westbrook's people into creating DNA strands that would mutate within his blood to form a deadly virus. Gaining control, Damocles Rivas transports MODOK's body and Captain America into the middle of one of the Hulk's rampages.

Now in Singapore and still controlling MODOK's body, Damocles Rives does little to defend himself against the Hulk in a suicide attempt. Captain America manages to convince Rivas that a solution to his situation can be found. Rivas uses MODOK's mental powers to bring Bruce Banner's personality to the surface of the Hulk's mind. After contacting Hank Pym and Reed Richards via satellite, the three scientists begin to work on a way to neutralize the virus within MODOK's blood. They succeed just as MODOK regains control of his body. MODOK unleashes the Hulk to rage again and cuts off the satellite link to Pym and Richards. Without the knowledge of how to administer the cure Captain America relies on the Falcon and Morales back in the Rivas Compound. These two find the transportation device Rivas used to get to Singapore and jury rig it to put MODOK in stasis after transporting him back.

At the Falcon's apartment he and Captain America find themselves in a heated argument that ends with the Falcon proclaiming "Captain America and the Falcon are finished!" Captain America sadly walks away just as an enraged ex-associate of the Falcon appears with a gun and shoots at the Falcon. The bullet misses its target but hits Captain America in the head. The Falcon rushes his partner to the hospital where Captain America begins to fight for his life. While this is happening, "Anti-Cap" attacks the embassy of Baud Olan, a middle eastern country he accuses of harboring terrorists. In the wake of this the Falcon seeks out "Anti-Cap" and confronts him.

After recovering in the hospital Captain America seeks out "Anti-Cap" in an effort to find the now missing Falcon. He tracks him to Paris. "Anti-Cap" refuses to reveal the Falcon's whereabouts and instead decides to attack Captain America. Their long fight ends when a defeated "Anti-Cap" allows himself to be run over by a subway train.
