= Champions III =

Tabletop role-playing game supplement

- Cover art by Stan Woch
- Designers: Steve Peterson
- Illustrators: Mark Williams; Mike Witherby
- Publishers: Hero Games
- Publication: 1984
- Genres: Superhero

Champions III is a supplement published by Hero Games in 1984 for the superhero role-playing game Champions.

== Contents ==
Champions III presents rules revisions and additions to powers and skills, and includes a randomized character creation process. as well as several adventure scenarios. New combat rules for using "Shockwave" — hitting the ground with enough force to knock people over — are included. A number of forms are included to add verisimilitude to a campaign or adventure.

== Publication history ==
Hero Games published the superhero role-playing game Champions in 1981. The following year, they published the game's first supplement, Champions II, and followed this in 1984 with Champions III, an 80-page book written by Steve Peterson, with cover art by Mark Williams, and interior art by Williams and Mike Witherby.

== Reception ==
in Space Gamer No. 70, Allen Varney wrote, "I recommend Champions III unreservedly to all Champions buffs who haven't been sated by I and II. It's an excellent supplement, well worth the price to players and GMs eager to expand their superheroic horizons.".

In the British RPG magazine Imagine, Pete Tamlyn commented "Champions players [...] will probably be interested in useful new rule systems [...] Champions III is not so good in this respect. With the notable exception of the random character generator mentioned above, most of the hardware concerns new powers or modifications to old ones. It is more of a set of upgrade notes than a supplement."

In Issue 33 of Abyss, Lew Bryson liked the cover art by Mark Williams, calling it "one of Williams' best pieces to date", but felt that the content inside the book "does not deliver on the promise." Bryson pointed out that the new powers included in the book were not creative enough, but he liked the inclusion of the "Shockwave" ability. Bryson was also impressed with the Character Development form "which will get your mind going on what your hero likes to eat, listen to, where he vacations, his ethnic background, and so on ... There is finally some attention paid to the character's life outside the superhero identity." However, Bryson thought the 15 pages of forms were a waste of paper, and concluded, "Hero Games seems to have lost some of its clean edge. They put out this supplement because it was time to put out a supplement. I hope they sit on the next one until they have something worthwhile to print on this many pages."

In Issue 39 of Different Worlds, Russell Grant Collins stated "I recommend this supplement to anyone who plays Champions, especially the harried game master who can't keep straight how far Dr. Evil has gotten on his master plan or how many VIPER bases the heroes have trashed this month. One last minor quibble, though. Aaron Allston's article, 'Mystery Powers and Disadvantages in Champions' is reprinted from Adventurer's Club, but he isn't credited anywhere in the book, unless he counts as part of 'the normal Hero Games crowd.'"

== Reviews ==
- Comics Feature #32
