= Sons of the Serpent =

Marvel Comics fictional group

Sons of the Serpents Sons of the Shield

Publication information
- Publisher: Marvel Comics
- First appearance: The Avengers #32 (1966)
- Created by: Stan Lee; Don Heck

In-story information
- Type of organization: Terrorist
- Base(s): Atlantic City
- Leader(s): Current members: Daboia; Donald Blake; Former members: Montague Hale; General Chen; Dan Dunn

The Sons of the Serpent are a supervillain group appearing in American comic books published by Marvel Comics. Created by writer Stan Lee and artist Don Heck, the group first appeared in The Avengers #32 (September 1966). The Sons of the Serpent is depicted as a racist organization. It experiments on people attempting to cross the American border. Superhero Joaquín Torres was notably captured by the group, and their experiments resulted in a painful transformation, turning him into a hybrid of a vampire and a falcon. The organization is also known as the Sons of the Shield.

== Publication history ==
=== 1960s ===
The Sons of the Serpent debuted in The Avengers #32 (September 1966), created by Stan Lee and Don Heck. It appeared in the 1972 Defenders series, the 1989 Captain Marvel series, and the 1996 Captain America series.

=== 2000s ===
The Sons of the Serpent made a cameo in the 2008 Runaways series, and appeared in the 2010 Avengers: Children's Crusade series. It appeared in the 2010 Taskmaster series, the 2011 Daredevil series, and the 2015 Captain America: Sam Wilson series.

== Fictional team history ==
The Sons of the Serpent are a subversive organization of costumed American racist super-patriots who oppose all racial, ethnic, and religious minorities. They sought to subvert the United States through hate crimes and organized protests, and were opposed by the Avengers and the Defenders. There have been many incarnations of the Sons of the Serpent across history.

=== First group ===
The first group calling itself the Sons of the Serpent first appeared in Avengers #32. They were secretly led by General Chen, an agent of Communist China. They attack black scientist Bill Foster who is working with Pym, meaning he tells the Avengers to investigate them. As the Supreme Serpent, Chen attempted to control the Avengers by holding Captain America hostage and making a member impersonate him.

=== Second group ===
The second Sons of the Serpent first appeared in Avengers #73. They were led by racist television demagogues Dan Dunn and Montague Hale, and targeted the African superhero Black Panther.

=== Third group ===
The third Sons of the Serpent first appeared in Defenders #22. They were financed through J.C. Pennysworth of Richmond Enterprises (Nighthawk's company) who was an African-American posing as a white racist in pursuit of power.

A sub-group of Serpent was featured in a back-up story in the nineteenth Avengers annual. Hubie Green is a young boy who idolizes the Avengers and dreams of being a super-hero. He gets the chance in a way he does not enjoy; he must turn his brother, the Serpent leader, over to the Avengers in order to save several cities from nuclear destruction.

=== Fourth group ===
The fourth Sons of the Serpent first appeared in Avengers Annual 2000 led by Russell Diabola, a demonic Serpent Man. This incarnation of the group became more involved in mysticism, including references to Set.

=== Fifth group ===
Another incarnation of The Sons of the Serpent appear in the miniseries The Last Defenders, led by an unidentified Supreme Serpent. They held a meeting in Dulwich, London, which was broken up by MI:5 working with Spitfire and Union Jack.

=== Sixth group ===
The Sons of the Serpents made a cameo in Runaways #10 (May 2009). In a game of truth or dare, Karolina Dean is dared to steal the Supreme Serpent's coiled staff. She does, and Nico Minoru inadvertently cracks the coiled staff with a spell from her own staff.

=== Seventh group ===
The group returns when Daredevil finds one of Matt Murdock's childhood bullies, Nate Hackett, facing charges of a previous association with the group, that Murdock determines he is innocent of. When he gets to the courtroom, however, he finds that the judge is a member of the Sons of the Serpent, determined to find out what Nate knows, and then kill him. Daredevil is able to foil the plot, and learns that the Sons of the Serpent have infiltrated a good portion of the New York City justice system. Following this, they take advantage of a racially motivated murder trial, and, using help from the Jester, try to start race riots in New York City.

=== Eighth group ===
The eight incarnation of the Sons of the Serpent work for Donald Blake, who they refer to as their father. They attack Sigurd Jarlson at the construction site that he is working at until the police arrive. As Jarlson is being interrogated about a construction accident that led to the death of several members of the Sons of the Serpent, Blake sends lawyer Kenneth Krask to bail him out. When Jarlson is brought into a limousine, Blake states that he sent the Sons of the Serpent to test him.

== Reception ==
=== Analysis ===
Marvel Comics writer Javier Rodríguez referred to the Sons of the Serpent as a "white supremacist group" spreading hate speech. George Marston of Newsarama described the Sons of the Serpents as a "white supremacist militia" team. Samuel Robert of TechRadar called the Sons of the Serpent a "hate-mongering" and "anti-American" group. Dan Gagnon of GoCollect argued the Sons of the Serpent mirrors the civil rights issues the United States faced at the time back when the organization was introduced. Drew Kopp of Comic Book Resources depicted the Sons of the Serpent as a "right-wing anti-immigrant militia." Marc Buxton of Den of Geek stated, "When the Sons were introduced back in 1966, it was a subversive, underground hate organization dedicated to eradicating all non-white races. Sadly, in 2018, what was once underground is now mainstream." Richard Newby of Inverse compared the Sons of the Serpent to the far-right organization Proud Boys.

==== Ku Klux Klan ====
Some journalists have described the Sons of the Serpent as a stand-in for the American white supremacist terrorist hate group Ku Klux Klan. Scott Harris-King of Looper named Avengers #32 (September 1966) one of the "earliest and most powerful stories in mainstream comics history" addressing issues of the civil rights movement, calling the Sons of the Serpent a "Ku Klux Klan analogue." Bob Darden of the Waco Tribune-Herald stated the Sons of the Serpent is modeled after the Ku Klux Klan, with the difference being their use of modern weapons, stating their objectives remain identical to the KKK, which includes "terrorizing minorities, recent immigrants, the disenfranchised, and sowing discord and hate in the United States."

=== Impact ===
The depiction of the Sons of the Serpent has been criticized by some conservative journalists with the release of Captain America: Sam Wilson #1 (October 2015). Some have stated the organization makes conservatives out to be "villains." American conservative channel Fox News argued the group serves to negatively depict Americans opposing illegal immigration. Fox News anchor Heather Childers stated that politics should be kept "out of comic books" in consequence.

Jessica Lachenal of The Mary Sue said Fox News was justifying a "supervillain’s hare-brained scheme to police" the borders of the United States, while Marc Daalder defended the presence of political and social commentary across Marvel comic books and described it as a "positive step." Alice W. Castle of Multiversity Comics mocked the interpretation of Fox News and said the TV presenters "align themselves with a fictional racial hate group." Jesse Schedeen of IGN found "disturbing" how some conservatives can identify themselves to the Sons of the Serpent and therefore defend the actions of the group. Brian Cronin of Comic Book Resources criticized those defending the organization based on its activities. Russ Dobler of AIPT Comics argued the Sons of the Serpent do not represent conservatives but those who can use an ideology as an excuse to justify their actions.

Gavia Baker-Whitelaw of The Daily Dot stated that this segment has sparked a debate regarding whether the new Captain America is "too political," a notion that was deemed "thoroughly shot down by fans of the comic." Petitions have emerged on both sides of the debate, with one calling for the resignation of comic book writer Nick Spencer receiving 46 signatures, while another expressing support for him has attracted 792, as of October 20, 2015.

== Other versions ==
=== MC2 ===
An alternate version of the Sons of the Serpent appears in the alternate future of MC2. An offshoot organization called the Soldiers of the Serpent appears in A-Next.

=== Marvel Adventures ===
An alternate version of the Sons of the Serpent appears on Earth-20051.
