= Karl Malus =

Marvel Comics villain

Dr. Karl Malus
- Dr. Karl Malus as seen in Superior Carnage #2.

Publication information
- Publisher: Marvel Comics
- First appearance: Spider-Woman #30 (Sept. 1980)
- Created by: Michael Fleisher; Steve Leialoha; Jim Mooney

In-story information
- Full name: Karlin Malus
- Species: Human–Symbiote hybrid
- Team affiliations: Frightful Four
- Notable aliases: Superior Carnage
- Abilities: Brilliant surgeon Gifted intellect Great knowledge of chemistry, genetic manipulation and radiology Via symbiote: Ability to mimic the powers and weaknesses of symbiotes

Dr. Karl Malus (/ˈmɑːləs/) is a fictional mad scientist and criminal appearing in American comic books published by Marvel Comics. He played a part in the origins of Armadillo, Hornet, Falcon (Joaquin Torres), and many other characters, before becoming the Superior Carnage in the comic-book series of the same name.

Dr. Karl Malus / Superior Carnage was included as a playable character in the video game Spider-Man Unlimited, and appeared in the second season of the Marvel Cinematic Universe (MCU) television series Jessica Jones, portrayed by Callum Keith Rennie.

== Publication history ==
Malus first appeared in Spider-Woman #30 (Sept. 1980) and was created by Michael Fleisher, Steve Leialoha and Jim Mooney. He was featured several times opposite of Captain America and Sam Wilson as Captain America. He was also briefly a member of the Frightful Four, before becoming the Superior Carnage in the 2013–14 comic-book series of the same name.

== Fictional character biography ==
Karl Malus was born in Mud Butte, South Dakota. He became a surgeon and researcher. He was later the founder of the Institute for Supranormality Research and became a criminal scientist.

In his first appearance, Malus performs illegal medical experiments funded by the Enforcer to find out more about superhumans and their abilities. He is approached by the Human Fly, a supervillain who was losing his powers. Malus sends the Human Fly to steal equipment, attracting the attention of Spider-Woman. Malus offers to cure Spider-Woman's friend Scotty McDowell, who was rendered comatose by one of the Enforcer's poison bullets, in exchange for leniency. Spider-Woman agrees, but while curing McDowell, Malus also experiments on him using Human Fly's DNA, which transforms him into the superhuman Hornet.

Malus studies the criminal Daddy Longlegs, who gained his powers from a modified growth-serum used by Black Goliath and had thus acquired a sample of Pym Particles, which could alter a person's size and mass. With this knowledge, Malus hopes to restore the powers of Erik Josten. He gives Josten growth powers and enhanced strength, turning him into the supervillain Goliath, but Goliath rejects Malus' offer of partnership.

Malus works for the Power Broker (Curtiss Jackson), using his technology to augment the strength of paying customers to superhuman levels. Half the subjects are killed or become deformed, but this information is kept secret. Power Broker and Malus also use addictive drugs on their subjects, telling them that the chemical is necessary to stabilize their powers. In truth, the drug only serves to keep the subjects working for the Power Broker.

Malus is recruited by the Wizard to become a new member of the Frightful Four, during which he is forcibly bonded to Carnage. Malus is eventually consumed by Carnage, causing him to become a symbiote hybrid.

== Powers and abilities ==
Dr. Karl Malus has an MD specializing in surgery and a master's degree in biochemistry, with a knowledge of chemistry, genetic manipulation, and radiology.

Following his ingestion by Carnage, Malus became a symbiote hybrid, giving him the powers and weaknesses of a symbiote.

== Collected edition ==
Title	Material collected	Published date	ISBN
Superior Carnage	Superior Carnage #1–5 and Superior Carnage Annual #1	January 2014	978-1-8465-3567-3

== In other media ==
- Karl Malus as Superior Carnage appears as a playable character in Spider-Man Unlimited.
- Karl Malus appears in Jessica Jones, portrayed by Callum Keith Rennie. This version is one of several doctors who runs IGH, a biotech clinic specializing in reconstructive surgery. Years prior, when Jessica Jones and her mother Alisa were critically injured in a car accident, they underwent treatment under Malus, who fell in love with Alisa. In the present, Trish Walker abducts Malus in an attempt to force him to give her superpowers similar to Jessica's, but Jessica foils the procedure before it can be finished and spares Malus. With nothing left to live for, Malus commits suicide by destroying his lab.
