= Champions (1975 team) =

Team of superheroes

- The Champions debut on the cover of The Champions #1 (October 1975). Art by Gil Kane and Dan Adkins.

Publication information
- Publisher: Marvel Comics
- Schedule: Bimonthly
- Format: Ongoing series
- Genre: Superhero
- Publication date: October 1975 – January 1978
- No. of issues: 17
- Main character(s): Angel, Black Widow, Darkstar, Ghost Rider, Hercules, Iceman

Creative team
- Created by: Tony Isabella; Don Heck
- Written by: Tony Isabella, Bill Mantlo
- Penciller(s): Don Heck, George Tuska, Bob Hall, John Byrne
- Inker(s): Mike Esposito, John Tartaglione, Vince Colletta, Bruce Patterson, Bob Layton, Frank Giacoia, John Byrne

The Champions are a fictional team of superheroes appearing in American comic books published by Marvel Comics. The team first appears in The Champions #1 (October 1975) and was created by writer Tony Isabella and artist Don Heck. Their titular series is regarded as an example of a failed superteam comic, suffering from constant turnover in the writers and artists working on the series, lack of a consistent direction or concept, and mediocre sales.

== Publication history ==
According to the letters page of Champions #6, writer Tony Isabella developed the concept of a new team of superheroes and originally wanted the roster to consist of former X-Men the Angel and Iceman, and the newly created Black Goliath. Black Goliath became unavailable when the character debuted in his own title, forcing Isabella to rethink the concept. Editor Len Wein insisted on at least five members, and Isabella added three established heroes: Russian spy Black Widow, the Greek god Hercules, and the supernatural avenger Ghost Rider. Captain Marvel, Power Man, and the Son of Satan were all considered for the final place on the roster before selecting the Ghost Rider. Writer and publisher David Anthony Kraft is credited with naming the team, with the title originally intended to be published in the Giant-Size format as Giant-Size Champions. Production difficulties, which caused a three-month delay between the first and second issues, prevented this.

Isabella has disputed this account on several points. First, he said, his original concept for the series was not a team book at all, but a humorous heroes-on-the-highway series in the vein of Route 66 with Angel and Iceman. Black Goliath was not discussed during the meeting which laid out the series concept, but rather was a character he planned to have join the Champions later, precisely because he was a character with his own series, also written by Isabella. Finally, he insisted that the series was always going to be in a regular size format, and has hypothesized that the "giant-size" story was put forward to cover up the fact that the team was missing deadlines. He also said that he chose Black Widow, Hercules, and Ghost Rider for the group under the editorial requirements that the team must have a woman, a strong man, and at least one character with their own series.

The title was eventually published as The Champions. It ran for 17 issues from October 1975 to January 1978. Publication was erratic; the series switched between monthly and bi-monthly throughout its run. The creative team saw an exceptionally high level of turnover, with 12 different writer/penciller/inker combinations over the course of just 17 issues. In addition to Don Heck, artists who drew the series include George Tuska, Bob Hall, and John Byrne. Starting with issue #8, the remainder of the series was written and pencilled by industry newcomers still learning their craft with the sole exception that the final issue was pencilled by Tuska. Though the reason for this is not known, it has been hypothesized that the series was already on the brink of cancellation at this point, making it a less risky place to field rookie creators.

A common criticism of The Champions was that the team lacked any sort of theme or reason for the members to continue working together. Isabella intended from the beginning for the Champions to be a superhero team for the common man, but admitted that the series never brought this theme across in a convincing way. The team never acquired their own rogues gallery, and instead battled established Marvel villains such as Pluto, the Stranger, and Kamo Tharnn, along with the occasional new foe such as Swarm. The Black Widow is elected the leader of the Champions in issue #6, and in issue #7 the team gets a headquarters. Russian heroine Darkstar became a regular character starting in issue #10, though she never actually joins the team. Black Goliath guest-stars in issue #11.

In an effort to boost the series' flagging sales, the Champions were featured as guest-stars for three consecutive months: in Iron Man Annual #4 (August 1977), The Avengers #163 (September 1977), and Godzilla, King of the Monsters #3 (October 1977). The attempt failed, and Champions was cancelled with issue #17. The second-to-last issue continued a story involving a power struggle between villains Doctor Doom and Magneto from the title Super-Villain Team-Up. Loose plot threads left by the last issue were wrapped up in Peter Parker, The Spectacular Spider-Man #17–18 (April–May 1978), in which the Champions disband.

In the short story "On the Air", published in the 1996 anthology The Ultimate X-Men, an interviewer asks the Angel about the Champions. The Angel defends the group's worth, saying they should be judged not by the short time they were together, but by how many people they helped. The group briefly reunite in an X-Force/Champions Annual. An issue of The Incredible Hulk features an untold tale of the Champions. The 2017 Iceman series included a Champions reunion in which Iceman, Angel, Darkstar, Hercules, and Ghost Rider gather to reminisce about Black Widow, who died during the Secret Empire series.

A new team also called the Champions, composed of teenage superheroes and with no connection to the 1970s team, debuted in October 2016.

== Trademark dispute ==
In 1987, Heroic Publishing began using the name "The Champions" for a comic book series based on a role-playing game. In 1988, the United States Patent and Trademark Office ruled that Marvel had abandoned its trademark of the name and could no longer use it, causing a planned 2007 revival of the series to be renamed The Order.

This dispute was later resolved, with Marvel in 2016 publishing a new Champions series that debuted following their Civil War II event. Heroic Publishing's president Dennis Mallonee commented in 2025, "I've always been on good terms with Marvel. We came to a nice accommodation regarding their use of the Champions trademark, and we both ended up happy."

== Collected editions ==
- Champions Classic Vol. 1 collects The Champions #1–11, 208 pages, July 2006, ISBN 978-0785120971
- Champions Classic Vol. 2 collects The Champions #12–17, Iron Man Annual #4, The Avengers #163, Super-Villain Team-Up #14, and Peter Parker, the Spectacular Spider-Man #17–18, 216 pages, January 2007, ISBN 978-0785120988
- The Champions: No Time for Losers collects The Champions #1–3 and 14–15, 100 pages, October 2016, ISBN 978-1302908577
- Champions Classic: The Complete Collection collects The Champions #1–17, Iron Man Annual #4, The Avengers #163, Super-Villain Team-Up #14, Peter Parker, the Spectacular Spider-Man #17–18, and Hulk Annual #7, 472 pages, July 2018, ISBN 978-1302911805
