= Champions (2016 team) =

Fictional superhero team appearing in Marvel Comics

- Cover of Champions (vol. 2) #1 (October 2016); Art by Humberto Ramos

Group publication information
- Publisher: Marvel Comics
- First appearance: Champions (vol. 2) #1 (October 2016)
- Created by: Mark Waid; Humberto Ramos

In-story information
- Type of organization: Superheroes
- Base(s): Champions Mobile Bunker, 616 Hickory Branch Lane, Cherrydale, Arlington, Virginia; Formerly: Olympus Group Secret HQ ATX001, Texas.
- Leader(s): Ms. Marvel

Roster
- See: List of Champions members

Champions

Series publication information
- Format: Ongoing series
- Publication date: (Volume 2) October 2016 - December 2018 (Volume 3) January 2019 - October 2019 (Volume 4) October 2020 - October 2021
- Number of issues: (Volume 2): 27 (Volume 3): 10 (Volume 4): 10
- Creator(s): Mark Waid; Humberto Ramos

The Champions are a team of teenaged superheroes appearing in American comic books published by Marvel Comics. The team first appears in Champions (vol. 2) #1 (October 2016) and was created by writer Mark Waid and artist Humberto Ramos.

== Publication history ==
In July 2016, Marvel announced the debut of the Champions, a team of teenage superheroes who became disillusioned with their predecessors and split off from the Avengers following the events of the 2016 "Civil War II" storyline. The team was created by writer Mark Waid and artist Humberto Ramos. Executive editor Tom Brevoort stated that the purpose of the team is to "reclaim and redefine in a classic sense what being a superhero should mean. Rather than seeing the previous generation as these icons that came before them, now they've interacted with them on a one-to-one basis and learned they aren't better or worse than anybody else." Brevoort explained that the characters chose the name Champions to distance themselves from the Avengers and wanted something decidedly upbeat. Brevoort also revealed that he had a list of several other names in case the trademark dispute with Heroic Publishing, which owned the name, fell through.

The first issue of the series was published on October 5, 2016. It sold 328,000 copies and was the second most sold book that month. It has been well received by critics and fans alike with an average score of 7.9 and 7.5 respectively on Comicbook Roundup.

The series was relaunched in January 2019 under a new creative team with Jim Zub as writer and Steven Cummings as artist, and ended in October 2019 with issue #10. This series is focused on the core trio of Miles Morales, Sam Alexander, and Kamala Khan, who had started operating globally along with the expanded lineup after Miles made a deal with the devil Mephisto to resurrect the deceased Kamala.

The series was scheduled for another relaunch in April 2020 with writer Eve Ewing and artist Simone Di Meo, but was disrupted due to COVID-19 pandemic. The Outlawed Marvel Comics crossover storyline began with the one-shot Outlawed #1 (March 2020) and continued over into Champions (vol. 4) #1-5 (October 2020-March 2021) along with other comic series which focused on young superheroes. Champions (vol. 4) #6-10 focused on the aftermath of Outlawed and resolved lingering threads.

== Fictional team biography ==
=== Origin ===
The Champions were formed following the departure of Ms. Marvel (Kamala Khan), Spider-Man (Miles Morales) and Nova (Sam Alexander) from the Avengers, when they became disillusioned by the behavior of their elders, especially in regards to the second superhuman Civil War. The young heroes desired to rectify the state of distrust by the people towards superheroes in general, and soon recruited other teenagers with similar ideals, Hulk (Amadeus Cho), and Viv Vision, daughter of the Vision.

After their first joint mission rescuing a group of girls being trafficked by Pagliacci, the young heroes revealed themselves to the public and Ms. Marvel proclaimed the team's mission to foster a better tomorrow through hope and wisdom rather than unjust force. Her speech became viral on the Internet, and the team was dubbed the "Champions" in social media. One of the superheroes encouraged by Ms. Marvel's speech was the time-displaced Cyclops (Scott Summers), who was admitted into the Champions' ranks after requesting membership.

=== Early missions ===
In their further early adventures, the Champions traveled to Sharzhad and helped a young girl named Amal stop militant fundamentalists from enforcing a gender apartheid. They were confronted by an Atlantean colony while cruising over their waters. Champions were joined by Gwenpool in fighting the xenophobic head of Daly County's police, Sheriff Studdard.

During the "Monsters Unleashed" storyline, the Champions crossed paths with the Freelancers, a group of teenage mercenaries, who were at the time working for Roxxon to silence protesters. The Freelancers' employers would make efforts to discredit the Champions, framing the young heroes for attacking homeless people, and later trademarking the Champions' logo. The Champions managed to clean the name, and Nova started a countermovement to reject the Champions-branded merchandise.

=== Secret Empire ===
When Hydra assumed control of the United States of America in the "Secret Empire" storyline, the Champions responded to Iron Man's distress call to protect Washington, D.C. alongside other American superheroes, all of whom were soundly defeated when Captain America wielded Mjolnir. The Champions retreated, ultimately regrouping at Olympus Group Secret HQ ATX001 after becoming separated from Ms. Marvel, who worked with the Secret Warriors to fight off Inhuman internment camps; and Scott was displaced to New Tian with America's mutants; and Nova was trapped beyond the Planetary Defense Shield in Earth Orbit.

Hulk, Viv, and Spider-Man eventually joined the Underground, where they associated with Ironheart (Riri Williams), Wasp (Nadia van Dyne), Falcon (Joaquin Torres), and Patriot (Rayshaun Lucas).

After Hydra leveled Las Vegas, Black Widow set out to assassinate Captain America. Spider-Man joined her, having decided to stop running away from his supposed destiny to kill Captain America, as prophesied by the precognitive Inhuman Ulysses Cain. The remaining Champions, alongside Falcon, Wasp and Ironheart followed him to offer their support, thus joining Black Widow's Red Room and got training from Black Widow. The teenagers were eventually captured by Hydra after Widow's assassination attempt failed and resulted in her death. Spider-Man almost killed Captain America, but Wasp convinced him not to, since they had learned Black Widow tried to kill Rogers herself to prevent Miles from becoming a killer. The teenagers were subsequently arrested.

When a contingent of America's remaining superheroes launched a desperate attack on Hydra, Hydra allies Taskmaster and Black Ant decided to switch sides in light of Hydra's eventual defeat, and freed the teenagers from their cell to be in the heroes' good graces. The Champions were reunited during the final battle, which saw the return of the real Captain America and fall of Hydra.

=== Post-Secret Empire ===
A short time following Hydra's fall, the Champions saw themselves forced into an uneasy alliance with the Avengers to stop the High Evolutionary from causing a collision between Earth and Counter-Earth. After being turned into an ordinary human by the High Evolutionary. Viv became trapped in another plane of existence while operating a device to foil the villain's plans. The Vision built a Viv 2.0 to cope with Viv's apparent death before Viv found her way home.

Taking into account Viv's feelings, the Champions refrained from welcoming Viv's twin into the team. Viv rejoined the Champions' rank after her twin sister went haywire and Viv was forced to kill Viv 2.0 in self-defense. The Vision and Wasp managed to repair Viv 2.0's body, and since they couldn't bring back her mind, Viv transferred her consciousness to the synthetic body as a way to both regain her powers and ensure her sister lived on through herself.

Following Viv's return to the team, Cyclops is forced to leave the Champions due to a call to arms from his fellow time-displaced X-Men.

After joining the ranks of the Champions full-time, Ironheart and Wasp helped Amadeus Cho create the Champions Mobile Bunker (C.M.B.), a new moving headquarters. Each of the Champions had a private room in the bunker, with the exception of Spider-Man and Nova.

During an investigation in Nunavut, Canada, the Champions stumbled into the machinations of Master of the World, and uncovered his capture of a local teenager named Amka Aliyak, who is bestowed shapeshifting powers after becoming infused with the Inua spirit Sila, from whom the Master of the World was leeching off energy for his machinery. Amka escaped from Master of the World's captivity and joined forced with the Champions and Alpha Flight to defeat Master of the World. She later joined the Champions as Snowguard.

=== Infinity Countdown ===
During the "Infinity Countdown" storyline, Champions, gained knowledge of an assault on the Nova Corps. Discovering it was the Chitauri Empire, led by Warbringer, Nova's old foe, they took the Bunker into space, where they found that the Warbringer's goal was to attack Thanos, Nova eventually realized that Thanos' army never moved, not even to defend themselves, and the team knocked out Warbringer, leaving the Chitauri without a leader and subsequently stopping the massacre.

Thanos then annexed Warbringer's army into his own, and thanked the Champions for the show. Furious, Ironheart ignored the others, and charged at him, before being caught by the throat, and her armor was swiftly destroyed. Thanos let her be, and the team took Warbringer back to the Nova Corps; however, Commander Scott Adsit took Sam's helmet, as he was not officially recognized as a Nova, then teleported the team back to Earth, much to Sam's horror.

During this period, Amadeus gained a new transformed state that is less powerful, but easier for him to control, and assumed the codename Brawn. Riri, after her run in with Thanos, revealed her Mk 3 Armor, with a new design and color scheme; however, now depowered, Sam could not feel anything but rage at everything and is depressed.

While helping a Tanzanian village suffering of water poisoning, the Champions discovered the Man-Thing inhabiting their swamp. The creature instinctively opened the portal, sending Sam and the Wasp to Weirdworld. The two were later tracked down by the Master of the World, who had been keeping an eye on the Champions since his defeat in Canada. He found Sam and Wasp amnesiac and mutated by Weirdworld's magic. He took them under his wing to use their new powers to conquer land.

When the rest of the Champions travelled to Weirdworld with the help of Inua spirit Sila. The Champions were scattered and transformed, though only Ironheart retained the memories of her past life due to her traumatic experience when fighting Thanos, and managed to reunite the team. Champions again defeated Master of the World and returned to their home.

=== Operating globally ===
Champions started operating globally after giving full membership to Falcon, Patriot, The Locust (Fernanda Rodriguez), Bombshell (Lana Baumgartner), Pinpoint (Qureshi Gupta) and Power Man (Victor Alvarez).

When the Champions were fighting Zzzax, Ms. Marvel and Viv Vision were killed in the process. Mephisto arrived and offered to rewind back time in to save their teammates. Miles accepted Mephisto's offer and the demon reversed time resurrecting their dead teammates but unwittingly allowing a girl he saved previously die. This led to Spider-Man quitting the team.

Sam also left the team to retrieve his helmet with his nemesis, Kaldera, who desired true fight with him as Nova. While Brawn and the Wasp started working simultaneously with Agents of Atlas and G.I.R.L. respectively.

During "The War of the Realms", the Champions fought with Rock Trolls in Australia. Meanwhile, Power Man and Pinpoint meet Cyclops who later took charge in leading the Champions against the Rock Trolls. Cyclops revealed Ms. Marvel that his younger self's memories are merged with his own and gave her the inspiration to control of the team. Ms. Marvel asked Dust (Sooraya Qadir), who had allied herself with the Champions to join them after Cyclops vouched for her. The Champions then went to São Paulo to defend it from Dísir, who have taken control over South America.

Meanwhile, Sam and Kaldera found Commander Scott Adsit and learned the helmet had been stolen by the Thieves Guild of New York and returned to Earth. Sam managed to find the helmet and rejoined the Champions before imprisoning Kaldera to Nova Corps.

Being held by Mephisto, Blackheart became privy to his father's latest scheme and begun corrupting members of the Champions, starting with Ironheart, who had been pushing away Viv due to the synthezoid apparently having feelings for her. Spider-Man was rejoined the team to help his friends. He, along with Ms. Marvel, also revealed their identities to Nova in order to free him from Blackheart's corruption. Blackheart, tried to use the deal that Miles made with Mephisto but Riri snapped out of his control due to Viv's affection. The Champions freed their teammates united to defeat Blackheart, who was taken down by his father since he ruined his plans.

=== Outlawed ===
Champions picks up six months after the Coles Disaster and the passage of the Underage Superhuman Welfare Act, also known as "Kamala's Law". CBR highlighted that "without disclosing her true identity, Ms. Marvel rejects Kamala's Law and publicly vows to continue her superhero activities alongside the Champions regardless of her age. [...] Kamala's message has quickly split the young superhero community. Several agree to continue their double lives as usual in open defiance of the controversial law, while others believe Kamala is in the wrong and they should leave superhero activity to the adults". Over the course of the Outlawed event, the Champions take responsibility for their actions and expose that Roxxon is using their government contract to place young individuals with super abilities into brutal reeducation camps. This leads to Roxxon losing their contract and the government pauses enforcement of Kamala's Law.

=== Killer App ===
While the Champions are now free to return to their crime-fighting careers, Kamala's Law is still intact while still at a minimum level, and Roxxon attempt to launch an app called "Roxx-On" to cover their dubious activities, under the direction of Miriam Blakemoore. Meanwhile, a Champion member Snowguard leads a group of protestors on Roxxon. Much to Riri's dismay, Roxxon hires her worst rival, André Sims, and Ms. Marvel learns that Roxxon uses their app to secretly gather data to ensure Kamala's Law is fully amended, revealing that André is creating Roxxon's Sentinel-like robots, Champerones to capture under-aged lawbreakers. Eventually, the Champions decide to send Miles and Sam to go undercover as interns, before they have no choice to put Kamala in this mission. During a rally speech by both Snowguard, Bombshell, and Falcon to their fellow protestors, the Champions arrive on time to save them from being ambushed by undercover Roxxon and C.R.A.D.L.E., at the same time they discover that Roxxon hired Fizzle's group, the super-powered criminal group who Champions fought yesterday night.

During Kamala's first undercover mission with Miles and Sam, Viv infiltrates Roxxon's secret lab where Champerones are created and sends the data of Roxxon's next plots to Riri. Thankfully, Kamala pretends to have a word with Miriam in private for the upcoming Roxx-On festival to ensure Viv escapes undetected. During the Roxx-On festival, the Champions secretly apprehend Fizzle group to ensure Kamala's public speech to expose Roxxon's true motive is a success. Finally, Kamala's Law is repealed and C.R.A.D.L.E. is disbanded for their attempt at brute force on Kamala earlier. While all of the younger superheroes celebrate their victory at the Champions' bunker, André secretly unleashes his Champerones unauthorized to hunt younger people who broke a now-repealed law. While the Champions evacuate civilians from the Champerones, Miriam stops André from damaging the company's reputation further and arrests him.

== Collected editions ==
Volume 2

#	Title	Material collected	Pages	Publication Date	ISBN
1	Change the World	Champions #1-5	136	May 16, 2017	978-1302906184
2	The Freelancer Lifestyle	Champions #6-12	136	December 26, 2017	978-1302906191
1	Avengers & Champions: Worlds Collide	Champions #13-15 Avengers #672-674	144	February 20, 2018	978-1302906139
3	Champion for a Day	Champions #16-18, #1.MU	112	August 21, 2018	978-1302906207
4	Northern Lights	Champions #19-21, Infinity Countdown: Champions #1-2	112	November 20, 2018	978-1302909826
5	Weird War One	Champions #22-27, Champions Annual	176	January 29, 2019	978-1302915056

Volume 3

#	Title	Material collected	Pages	Publication Date	ISBN
1	Beat the Devil	Champions #1-6	112	August 20, 2019	978-1302916718
2	Give and Take	Champions #7-10 and Nova (2015) #1	112	December 17, 2019	978-1302916725

Volume 4

#	Title	Material collected	Pages	Publication Date	ISBN
1	Outlawed	Outlawed #1 and Champions #1-5	152	January 26, 2021	978-1302922900
2	Killer App	Champions #6-10	113	December 29, 2021	978-1302930165

== In other media ==
=== Video games ===
- A Champions table was released as part of the "Women of Power" DLC pack for Zen Pinball 2 and Pinball FX2.
- The Champions appear in Lego Marvel Super Heroes 2.
- The Champions appear in Marvel Ultimate Alliance 3: The Black Order, consisting of Miles Morales, Ms. Marvel, and Spider-Gwen.
- The Champions appear in Marvel Strike Force, consisting of Brawn, Miles Morales, Sam Alexander, Ms. Marvel, and Moon Girl.

=== Miscellaneous ===
The Champions received an expansion for the Marvel Legendary deck-building game, consisting of Viv Vision, the Totally Awesome Hulk, Nova, Ms. Marvel, and Gwenpool.
