= Joaquin Torres (comics) =

Marvel Comics superhero

Joaquín Torres Falcon

Publication information
- Publisher: Marvel Comics
- First appearance: Captain America: Sam Wilson #1 (October 2015)
- Created by: Nick Spencer; Daniel Acuña

In-story information
- Full name: Joaquín Torres
- Species: Human mutate-vampire hybrid
- Team affiliations: Champions
- Partnerships: Sam Wilson / Captain America
- Notable aliases: Falcon
- Abilities: Regenerative healing factor; Psychic link with Redwing; Flight

Joaquín Torres is a character appearing in American comic books published by Marvel Comics. Created by writer Nick Spencer and artist Daniel Acuña, the character first appeared in Captain America: Sam Wilson #1 (October 2015). He is a Mexican-American superhero from Sonoita, Arizona known under the codename Falcon. The character is a human-bird-vampire hybrid.

Torres was kidnapped by the criminal scientist Karl Malus while aiding migrants at the border. Malus spliced his DNA with that of Redwing, the bird companion of Sam Wilson, the then-Captain America. The experiment granted Torres a range of superpowers, including wings, enhanced vision, accelerated healing, and a psychic link with Redwing. After adapting to his new abilities, Torres took on the mantle of Falcon and later allied with various heroes, including the Champions.

Since his original introduction in comics, Torres has been featured in various other Marvel-licensed products, including video games, animated television series, and merchandise. Danny Ramirez portrays the character in the Marvel Cinematic Universe miniseries The Falcon and the Winter Soldier (2021) and the film Captain America: Brave New World (2025).

== Publication history ==
Joaquín Torres debuted in Captain America: Sam Wilson #1 (October 2015), created by Nick Spencer and Daniel Acuña. Torres made his first appearance as a photograph in the comic book and made his official debut in issue #3. He appeared in the 2022 Captain America: Symbol of Truth series.

== Fictional character biography ==
Sam Wilson / Captain America investigates the disappearance of Mexican teenager Joaquín Torres after he is abducted by the Sons of the Serpent. Captain America discovers that Torres is being used in the experiments of Karl Malus, who uses Redwing to transform him into a bird/human hybrid. After Malus is defeated, Captain America takes Torres in. However, he learns that Torres possesses a healing factor derived from Redwing's vampire abilities that prevents him from being returned to normal. After the Serpent Society is defeated, Captain America allows Torres to become his sidekick and the new Falcon. During the "Secret Empire" storyline, Falcon and Ironheart join the Champions.

== Powers and abilities ==
As a human-falcon hybrid, Joaquín Torres developed wings, feathered arms, enhanced vision, and claw-like talons. Due to Redwing's vampiric nature, he also gained an accelerated healing factor, allowing him to recover quickly from severe injuries. Additionally, Torres shares a psychic link with Redwing, enabling communication with Sam Wilson through the bird.

== In other media ==
=== Television ===
Joaquín Torres / Falcon makes a cameo appearance in the Avengers Assemble episode "Into the Future" as a resistance fighter from a future ruled by Kang the Conqueror.

=== Marvel Cinematic Universe ===
Joaquín Torres appears in media set in the Marvel Cinematic Universe (MCU), portrayed by Danny Ramirez. This version is a human Air Force lieutenant. Following his first appearance in the miniseries The Falcon and the Winter Soldier (2021), Torres takes on the Falcon mantle in the film Captain America: Brave New World (2025) and will return in the film Avengers: Doomsday.

=== Video games ===
- Joaquín Torres / Falcon appears as an unlockable playable character in Marvel Future Fight.
- Joaquín Torres / Falcon appears as a playable character in Marvel Contest of Champions.
- Joaquín Torres / Falcon appears as a playable character in Marvel Strike Force.
- Joaquín Torres / Falcon appears in Marvel Snap.

=== Merchandise ===
- The MCU incarnation of Joaquín Torres / Falcon received an action figure in Hasbro's Marvel Legends line.
- The MCU incarnation of Joaquín Torres / Falcon received a Funko Pop figure.
