= Ray Greer =

American game designer

- Occupation: Game designer

Ray Greer is a game designer who has worked primarily on role-playing games.

== Career ==
George MacDonald and Steve Peterson opened an office for their company Hero Games in 1982 and invited Ray Greer to join the company as a partner in charge of marketing and sales. Greer went to work at Steve Jackson Games by 1986, and then went to work for the special effects company owned by Mark Williams. Peterson founded the company Hero Software and built a team to create a Champions computer game, and Greer joined this team later, but the project was never completed. Greer, Peterson and Bruce Harlick, were involved in the Hero Games partnership with R. Talsorian Games that began in 1996. Mike Pondsmith of R. Talsorian, and Hero Games owners Peterson and Greer constructed conversion rules to link Interlock and Hero Games, resulting in the Fuzion system. Pondsmith, Peterson, and Greer jointly hold the rights to Fuzion.
