= Bruce Harlick =

Role-playing game designer

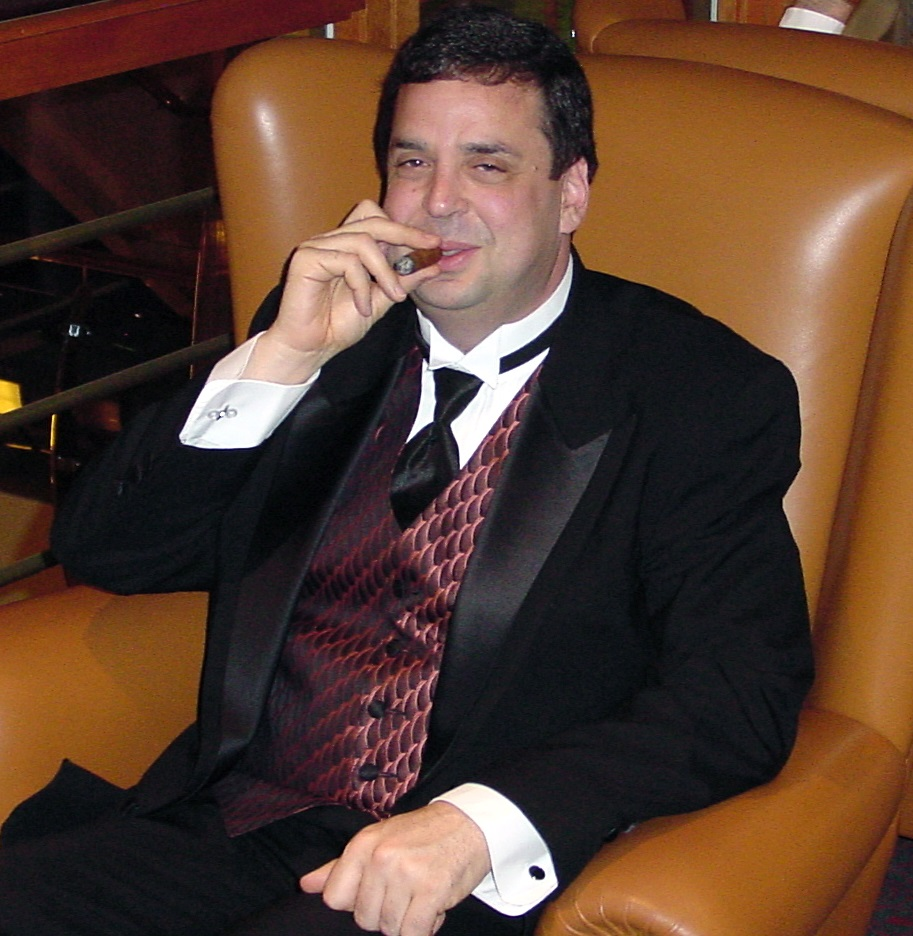
- Bruce Harlick in 2003
- Occupation: Game designer
- Known for: Role-playing games

Bruce Harlick is a game designer who has worked primarily on role-playing games.

== Career ==
Bruce Harlick became the first employee of Hero Games in 1982. Harlick was a gamemaster running a Champions campaign in the fictional Ocean City for his fellow employees. He edited the supplements Champions II (1982), and Enemies II (1982). His Champions characters Marksman and Foxbat appeared in the Champions comic book series (1986-1987) from Eclipse Comics after Dean Mullaney secured licensing rights; after some of the licensing rights were pulled, the characters continued as Huntsman and The Flying Fox, respectively. Harlick also worked for TSR as an editor on Dark Sun supplements, such as Merchant House of Amketch (1993), Marauders of Nibenay (1993), and The Ivory Triangle (1993).

Harlick later replaced Monte Cook as line editor for the Hero System books at Iron Crown Enterprises. Harlick and Bill Robinson took over as editors for the magazine Adventurers Club, after issue #18 had appeared in fall 1992, and after promising to revive the magazine issue #19 was published a few months later and issue #20 after that. Harlick contacted Chris Avellone, asking him to write a character book for Champions, which he agreed to, resulting in 1993's Underworld Enemies. Harlick was one of the members of the fanzine Haymaker!, along with fellow Champions writers Steven S. Long, Chris Avellone, and Bryce Nakagawa. He was one of the authors of Enemies Assembled! (1995). Harlick was involved, with Steve Peterson and Ray Greer, in the Hero Games partnership with R. Talsorian Games that began in 1996. Harlick was one of the authors of the supplement Alliances (1997). Harlick designed Champions: New Millennium (1997), described as a major-spin off that was "a much darker version of the work in which almost all of the world's super-heroes have been wiped out in a millennial apocalypse, and the players' characters must take their places."

When Cybergames.com acquired Hero Games in 2000, Harlick became the new President of the Hero Games division. Harlick joined the video game industry, becoming part of projects such as The Matrix Online and DC Universe Online for Monolith Productions, a Marvel Comics MMORPG for Sigil Games Online, as well as an Indiana Jones game for LucasArts. Harlick left LucasArts in 2007 and moved to Paragon Studios as lead designer for City of Heroes.
