= George MacDonald (game designer) =

American game designer

- Occupations: Game designer, producer
- Employer(s): Hero Games; Strategic Simulations
- Known for: Champions; Pool of Radiance; Curse of the Azure Bonds

George MacDonald is a game designer who has worked primarily on role-playing games and in the computer game industry.

== Career ==
George MacDonald started working on role-playing games while at college, by adding detail to the super powers system for the Superhero: 2044 role-playing game (1977) from Gamescience and ultimately creating his own original game system which Steve Peterson typed up, and which eventually became the Champions (1981) superhero role-playing game. MacDonald and Peterson had only enough money to print 1,500 copies of the game and hand-collated them to save money, and they sold their new game at Pacific Origins 1981; they were surprised to see it sell very well, selling 1,000 of their 1,500 copies at the convention. After this early success, MacDonald and Peterson started Hero Games as a publishing label. MacDonald and Peterson were ready to start making Hero Games into a professional business by 1982, so they opened an office and asked Ray Greer to be their partner handling marketing and sales, with Bruce Harlick soon becoming the first employee of Hero Games. Michael Stackpole and MacDonald happened to meet up at a 1982 convention, which resulted in an alliance between Flying Buffalo and Hero Games.

MacDonald later became the Senior Game Developer at Strategic Simulations. MacDonald was the developer on the Gold Box game Pool of Radiance (1988). MacDonald and Jeff Grubb authored the game module Curse of the Azure Bonds, which was released in April 1989 under Forgotten Realms Module FRC2.
