= Steve Peterson (game designer) =

American game designer

- Occupation: Game designer
- Years active: 1981-present

Steve Peterson is an American game designer who has worked primarily on role-playing games.

== Career ==
Steve Peterson typed up the ideas and spent hours reviewing the rules for the superhero role-playing game that George MacDonald had been working on, and which eventually became Champions (1981). MacDonald and Peterson had only enough money to allow them to print 1,500 copies of the game and hand-collated the pages to save money, and they sold their new game at Pacific Origins 1981; they were surprised at how well it sold, selling 1,000 of their 1,500 copies at the convention. After this early success, MacDonald and Peterson started Hero Games initially as a publishing label. MacDonald and Peterson opened an office for Hero Games in 1982 and asked Ray Greer to be their partner handling marketing and sales. MacDonald and Peterson designed the game Espionage! (1983), which was later updated with L. Douglas Garrett as Danger International (1985).

Peterson began working at Electronic Arts by 1986. Peterson later started the new company Hero Software, and used this to license the rights to Champions from Hero Games. Peterson got four designers and programmers together in 1990 with some established artists from Hero Games, as well as Hero founder Ray Greer to create a Champions computer game, but the project was never completed. Peterson was involved, with Ray Greer and Bruce Harlick, in the Hero Games partnership with R. Talsorian Games that began in 1996. Mike Pondsmith of R. Talsorian, with and Hero Games owners Peterson and Greer built conversion rules to connect the Interlock and Hero rules systems, resulting in the Fuzion system. Cybergames.com acquired Hero Games in 2000, and they hired Peterson as Vice President of Marketing and Product Development.
