= David Lubin Memorial Library =

- 41°52′56.32″N 12°29′17.96″E
- Location: Rome, Italy
- Established: 1952

Collection
- Size: 1,500,000 total items 268,000 books - FAO; 360,000 books - IIA; 15,000 serial titles - FAO; 5,572 serial titles - IIA 3,200 rare books

Access and use
- Access requirements: Open to the public. Letter of introduction required.

Other information
- Website: http://www.fao.org/library

The David Lubin Memorial Library is the main library of the Food and Agriculture Organization of the United Nations (FAO). Its world-renowned collection consists of technical material related to food, nutrition, agriculture, forestry and fisheries, with emphasis on developing countries. The core of its historical collection is the library of the International Institute of Agriculture (IIA), whose assets were entrusted to FAO when the IIA was disbanded in 1946.

== Historical background ==
The "Hot Springs Conference," of 1943 (Virginia, US) resulted in the establishment of an Interim Commission on Food and Agriculture based in Washington, D.C., During this period, custodianship of the IIA's library was maintained in Rome by FAO's European Regional Office.

The foundations for a central FAO library were laid in 1945, in Article I of FAO's Constitution, which states that the organization: "shall collect, analyse, interpret and disseminate information relating to nutrition, food and agriculture."

The first FAO librarian was appointed in Rome in 1946. In 1950, FAO's governing Conference voted to merge the technical libraries in Rome and Washington, D.C., with the library collection of the IIA, basing the entire collection in Rome. The new library was named after David Lubin, in recognition of his service in the founding of the IIA. Combined, this library constituted the second largest agricultural library in the world

== Library facilities ==
In 1999, the Italian government (which owns the FAO headquarters buildings) began renovation of the library's physical space. The newly designed library includes facilities for access to electronic resources, multifunctional meeting room spaces and e-learning labs for computer training. Construction of the new premises, designed by Sartogo Architetti Associati began in 2002 and was completed in 2005.

== Access ==
The library is open to visitors with a letter of introduction.

Online access to FAO information resources is provided through:

The David Lubin Memorial Library catalogue – includes bibliographic citations of materials published by FAO from 1945. Bibliographic citations for materials not published by FAO date back to 1976. The catalogue also contains links to the full text of FAO publications online, when available. Consult a librarian for information regarding pre-1976 non-FAO materials.
The FAO Document Repository – a digital collection of FAO documents and publications, including selected non-FAO publications. Documents exist in all FAO official languages – English, French, Spanish, Arabic, Chinese, and Russian.

== FAO Collection ==
The library's holdings include a collection of primary documentation relating to milestones in the history of food security, such as the declaration of the 44 delegates of the international conference that resulted in the founding of FAO; the "McDougall Memorandum;" documentation surrounding the World Food Conference of 1974 and documentation of the FAO Freedom from Hunger Campaign. The library maintains a collection of material written by and about Nobel Prize laureate and first FAO Director General, Lord Boyd Orr. Part of the library's mandate includes the preservation of FAO's institutional memory, including unpublished reports, pre-investment surveys and training activities devoted to field projects in developing countries.

FAO staff and on-site patrons have access to databases and electronic journals in FAO subjects of expertise.

== Forestry Information Centre ==
The Forestry Library of the FAO Forestry Department, located at FAO headquarters in Rome and now part of the David Lubin Memorial Library, is a specialized library that holds approximately 6,000 books and over 600 current periodical titles, yearbooks and other serial titles on forestry and related areas. It also has a large collection of grey literature - including documentation on FAO forestry projects and papers and reports from various FAO Forestry meetings - much of which is not readily available anywhere else.

=== Subjects ===
Subjects covered include:

- sustainable forest management
- fire management
- arid zone forestry
- forest health
- planted forests
- genetic resources
- wood energy
- harvesting
- industries
- trade and forests
- non-wood forest products
- biodiversity
- climate change
- desertification
- environment
- utilization alien invasive species
- forests and water
- participatory processes
- forests and poverty reduction
- gender
- small-scale enterprises
- conflict management
- forest law compliance and governance
- national forests programmes
- global forest resource assessment
- and other related subjects

== Special Collections ==
The library provides on-site visitors with access to the contents of the library of the former International Institute of Agriculture. The IIA collection contains detailed statistical information on the global agricultural situation during the first half of the 20th century. It also includes several special collections.

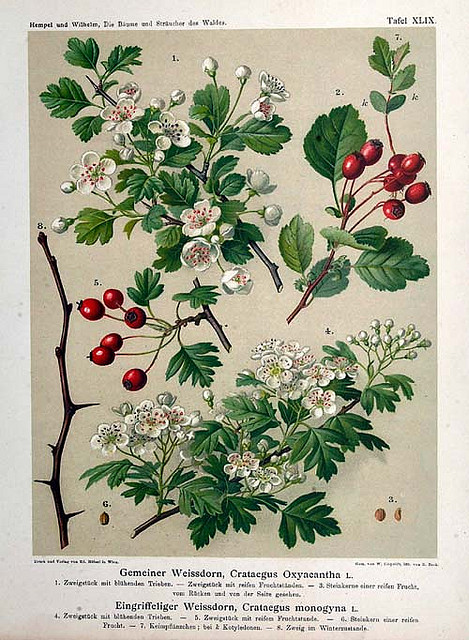
Illustration from "Die Baeume und Straeucher des Waldes in botanischer und forstwirthschaftlichr Beziehung." From the CIS collection.

Cappelli Collection

Donated by the second president of the IIA, this collection includes 185 rare books, 20 of which are incunabula.

Centre International de Silviculture Collection

The complete collection of the CIS—a research center created with the aim of establishing an exhaustive international collection of documentation related to forests, forestry, and the timber industry.

Marescalchi Collection

This collection is composed of pamphlets, bulletins and periodicals donated by A. Marescalchi, noted wine scholar and Undersecretary of State in the Italian Ministry of Agriculture.

Giglioli Collection

A 19th-century collection composed of 10,000 volumes and pamphlets on agriculture. It includes the archives of Italo Giglioli's family, and photos and publications written by Giglioli (a professor of agricultural chemistry at the University of Pisa who participated in the founding of the IIA)

== David Lubin Archives ==
The David Lubin Archives housed at FAO include correspondence, writings, clippings and photographs relating to world agricultural problems and the activities of the International Institute of Agriculture. A small part of the archives includes Lubin's personal correspondence.

The library accepts researchers to the David Lubin Archives, upon request.

== Partnerships ==
- AGLINET is an international, voluntary network of agricultural libraries that was founded in 1971 within the framework of the International Association of Agriculture Librarians and Documentalists (IAALD). AGLINET libraries share resources, so that all partner libraries have access to the specialized, regional agricultural information produced in countries with AGLINET centers. These libraries achieve comprehensive resource coverage, not only for the benefit of member libraries' own constituencies, but also in support of other libraries within their country/region.
- The Aquatic Commons is an open access digital repository covering the natural marine, estuarine /brackish and fresh water environments. It includes all aspects of the science, technology, management and conservation of these environments, their organisms and resources, and the economic, sociological and legal aspects. It is directed by the International Association of the Aquatic and Marine Science Libraries and Information Centers (IAMSLIC) with technical support from the Project Office for International Oceanographic Data and Information Exchange (UNESCO-IOC/IODE) Programme. Many of the electronic documents in the Aquatic Commons are cited in the FAO sponsored Aquatic Sciences and Fisheries Abstracts database (ASFA).
- AGORA The library is involved in FAO’s AGORA programme, one of four programmes under the Research4Life initiative, which aims to enhance the scholarship of students, faculty and researchers in the developing world. AGORA provides eligible institutions in developing countries in 106 countries with either free or very low cost access to an outstanding digital library collection of more than 3000 journals in the fields of food, agriculture, environmental science and related social sciences.

== See also ==
- World Forestry Congress
- Unasylva: FAO's international journal of forestry and forest industries
