= Pan-American Journal of Aquatic Sciences =

- Discipline: Aquatic sciences
- Language: English, Spanish, Portuguese
- Edited by: Pablo Muniz Maciel

Publication details
- History: 2006-present
- Open access: Yes

Standard abbreviations
- ISO 4: Pan-Am. J. Aquat. Sci.

Indexing
- ISSN: 1809-9009
- OCLC no.: 74465968

Links
- Journal homepage; Online archive

The Pan-American Journal of Aquatic Sciences is a peer-reviewed open access scientific journal. It covers research on all aspects of the aquatic sciences. Articles are published in English, Spanish, or Portuguese.

== Abstracting and indexing ==
The journal is abstracted and is indexed in Aquatic Sciences and Fisheries Abstracts and Scopus.
