= Neotropical Ichthyology =

- Discipline: Ichthyology
- Language: English
- Edited by: Carla S. Pavanelli

Publication details
- History: 2003–present
- Publisher: Sociedade Brasileira de Ictiologia (Brazil)
- Frequency: Quarterly
- Open access: Yes
- License: CC-BY-NC 3.0

Standard abbreviations
- ISO 4: Neotrop. Ichthyol.

Indexing
- ISSN: 1679-6225 (print); 1982-0224 (web)
- LCCN: 2006452349
- OCLC no.: 56597180

Links
- Journal homepage; Online archive

Neotropical Ichthyology is a peer-reviewed scientific journal focusing on all aspects of Neotropical ichthyology. It is published by the Sociedade Brasileira de Ictiologia (Brazilian Society of Ichthyology) and is its official publication. The journal was established in 2003 and is edited by Carla S. Pavanelli.

== Indexing and abstracting ==
Neotropical Ichthyology is indexed and abstracted in:

- Aquatic Sciences and Fisheries Abstracts
- Biological Abstracts
- BIOSIS Previews
- Current Contents
- Journal Citation Reports
- Science Citation Index Expanded
- The Zoological Record
