= Aquatic Microbial Ecology =

- Discipline: Microbial ecology
- Language: English
- Edited by: Paul A. del Giorgio, Fereidoun Rassoulzadegan

Publication details
- Former name: Marine Microbial Food Webs
- History: 1985–present
- Publisher: Inter Research
- Frequency: Monthly
- Impact factor: 1.4 (2022)

Standard abbreviations
- ISO 4: Aquat. Microb. Ecol.

Indexing
- ISSN: 0948-3055 (print); 1616-1564 (web)

Links
- Journal homepage

Aquatic Microbial Ecology is a monthly peer-reviewed scientific journal covering all aspects of aquatic microbial dynamics, in particular viruses, prokaryotes, and eukaryotes in marine, limnetic, and brackish habitats. The journal was originally established as Marine Microbial Food Webs by P. Bougis and F. Rassoulzadegan in 1985, and acquired its current name in 1995. The journal is currently published by Inter Research.

== Abstracting and indexing ==
The journal is indexed and abstracted in:

- Aquatic Sciences & Fisheries Abstracts
- BIOSIS Previews
- CAB Abstracts
- Science Citation Index Expanded
- Scopus

Aquatic microbial ecology studies the effects of bacteria and other microorganisms in oceans, lakes, and rivers. Marine ecosystems are constantly evolving due to changes in chemical balances, light exposure, interactions with other microorganisms, and large animals. Marine ecosystems are interconnected through ocean water circulation; therefore, when one ecosystem is spurred to growth, it can have positive or negative effects on neighboring ecosystems. The microorganisms that make up and affect the marine ecosystems are crucial for the function of all marine ecosystems by determining the nutrient levels available and feeding animals and plants within each ecosystem.

Phytoplankton and bacteria are two organisms that play a crucial role in maintaining the health of marine ecosystems. Their combination of pathways is crucial for the growth of each marine ecosystem. Phytoplankton is crucial for the process of photosynthesis, which allows for bacteria to also grow in ecosystems. When bacteria reach a certain stage of growth, they begin to release ions such as nitrogen, phosphate, carbon, and iron into the ecosystem to allow further growth of the ecosystem. When shortages of these ions go on for significant amounts of time in one ecosystem, the growth of that ecosystem then affects further ecosystems, from this ecosystems across the ocean can later be affected and decline in health due to lack of nutrients and ions from the phytoplankton and bacteria in the original ecosystem.

Aquatic microbial diversity also provides insight into how the metabolism and interactions of individual organisms influence microbial community dynamics and drive biogeochemical processes at the ecosystem level. These processes occur across a wide range of environments, from Antarctic aquatic systems to desert water habitats. For example, the Antarctic Polar Front has also been shown to influence marine microbial composition. The Antarctic Polar Front has been found to affect the composition of marine microbial communities. Aquatic microbial ecology has also evolved through a conceptual progression, beginning with the view of aquatic systems as a "water desert," advancing to their recognition as microcosms, and ultimately to their understanding as fully integrated ecosystems.

Anthropogenic pressures on natural environments have steadily increased since the Industrial Revolution due to population growth, habitat modification and destruction, and pollution. Water pollution from human activities represents a major additional stressor on aquatic ecosystems. Flow cytometry (FCM) has recently been used to study microorganisms in aquatic environments. This system helps understand microorganisms' behavior and ecological roles, presenting challenges that traditional methods do not address. This new system has even shown that refractory dissolved organic compounds can be transformed into microbially labile compounds through exposure to solar radiation across multiple wavelength bands.
