= Gyre (disambiguation) =

An ocean gyre is any large system of rotating ocean currents in oceanography.

Gyre or gire may also refer to:

== Natural and scientific phenomena ==
- Cyclone
- Tornado
- Tropical cyclone
- Vortex
- Whirlpool or maelstrom
- Central American gyre, a broad and seasonal area of low pressure that occurs over the eastern Pacific Ocean and western Caribbean Sea.

== Other uses ==
- Gire, a band including the musician Kátai Tamás
- TeX Gyre, a collection of fonts derived from fonts released by URW++ Design & Development GmbH
- USNS Gyre, an American research ship

== See also ==
- The Widening Gyre (disambiguation)
- Jabberwocky
