= World Forestry Congress =

The World Forestry Congress (WFC) is the largest and most significant gathering of the world's forestry sector and it has been held every six years since 1926 under the auspices of the Food and Agriculture Organization (FAO) of the United Nations, organized by the government of the host country. It is a forum for the sharing of knowledge and experience regarding the conservation, management and use of the world's forests, and covers such issues as international dialogue, socio-economic and institutional aspects, and forest policies.

The aim of the WFC is to contribute to orient/shape international action in silvicultural aspects and stimulate global competency and reflection that can inform the development of the global forestry sector. The WFC may also be providing guidance to national and international forestry organizations as to the most appropriate and effective means to coordinate international actions concerning technical and policy. Finally, the Congress can contribute to identify action lines, define guidelines to stimulate the development of national policies, propose incentives to orient the public and private sector, promote international cooperation in forestry matters, whilst contributing to social progress and the conservation of natural resources at global, regional and national levels.

== General relevance and objectives ==
The World Forestry Congresses are an international effort aimed at influencing and stimulating reflection and analysis of the different factors, conditions, techniques, methodologies as well as professional or personal positions, thinking and ideas concerning global silviculture science. As such, each WFC has contributed to create awareness, to review and/or to formulate new approaches to technical, scientific or policy actions within the forestry sector.

The value and utility of the WFC rests also in the opportunity it offers to the world foresters and sectoral decisions-makers to analyse and expose their technical convictions and experiences, to discuss and exchange ideas and thinking, and to broaden their perspectives by sharing their common as well as diverse problems. This is particularly true today, as forestry development is becoming more and more a topic with international linkages and implications.

The growth in exchanges of knowledge and people in the forestry sector benefits all countries, and especially those with more need for forestry development. The diffusion of the scientific and technical advances as well as the human contacts promoted by the Congress, contribute to a better global balance in this sector and allow dissemination of more accurate information about forestry.

The WFC does not play the role of assessing the political, economic and social objectives of the participant countries. However, in its capacity as extraordinary assembly with broad representation from many countries and forestry groups, it contributes continuously to drawing public attention to forest related issues, to the need to raise livelihoods, and to the importance of the multiple benefits provided by forests.

Future WFCs will continue to promote international exchange, both as a result of new research and collaborations and of better comprehension of forest ecosystems and techniques for the sustainable development of these resources in the 21st century.

== List of World Forestry Congresses ==
=== 1st and 2nd World Forestry Congresses: 1926 and 1936 ===
- The 1st World Forestry Congress was held in Rome in 1926.
- The 2nd World Forestry Congress was convened at Budapest in 1936. These two conferences have been milestones in the development of international co-operation in forestry. The impetus which they gave has become evident in the ever-growing common effort for a solution of the many problems affecting forestry and forest products. The Third Congress was planned for 1940 with the Government of Finland as host. The war, however, intervened and the Congress had to be postponed.

=== 3rd World Forestry Congress: Helsinki, Finland, 10–20 July 1949 ===
At the end of World War II, the Government of Finland was again prepared to extend its hospitality to a gathering of the world's foresters. The 1947 session of FAO's annual Conference, held at Geneva, passed a resolution calling for a World Forestry Congress in 1949. FAO's Annual Conference gladly accepted Finland's proposal of Helsinki resuming its role as the site of the Third World Forestry Congress. Professor E. Saari was appointed Chairman of the Organizing Committee and Mr Leppo, Secretary-General.

"When this third Congress reviews the progress made since 1936, it will be seen how greatly ideas and practice in various countries have benefited from international exchanges of view and experience."

The Congress achieved an important resolution, recommended the preparation of a forestry dictionary in the major languages of the world. Such a dictionary should not only list translations of terms; it should also give precise definitions of the terms most commonly used in forestry and of the more important phrases of the forester's vocabulary.

The main themes of the Third Congress were:

- Silvics and silviculture
- Forest surveys (the essential role of the techniques of sampling and forest inventories in the composite picture of forestry and wood technology)
- Forest economics (including Forest policy)
- Forest utilization
- Forest industries

=== 4th World Forestry Congress: Dehra Dun, India, December 1954 ===
The objective of the Congress was to determine the role and place of forested areas in the general land economy and economic development of a country, in the light of progress made to date in knowledge of forest resources, in silviculture and management, in logging and utilization.

The main themes for discussion were:

1. Present situation of forest protection and forest management in the world
2. Protective functions of the forest
3. Forest products utilization
4. Tropical forestry

An excerpt from FAO's Director-General Message to the Fourth World Forestry Congress:

What do I expect from the Fourth World Forestry Congress? Not directives which only Governments can give, but instructive information and advice on which those directives can be based and, following which, I can see that our abilities for service can be made most effective.

If we can recognize the inviting horizons ahead and be advised how we can move towards them in helpful association with each other, I am convinced we can realize our ambitions. In so doing we can experience the gratification of achievement which, after all, is perhaps one of the highest forms of compensation to be derived from any endeavor.

=== 5th World Forestry Congress: Seattle, United States, 1960 ===
The central theme of the Congress was the "Multiple Use of Forest and Associated Lands." Multiple use means the management of the forest in a manner that, while conserving the basic land resource, will yield a high level of production in the five major uses – wood, water, forage, recreation, and wildlife – for the long-run benefit of the largest possible number of people.

The main themes discussed in the Congress were:

1. Forest Protection
2. Education
3. Forest and Range Watersheds
4. Logging and Forest Operations
5. Genetics and Tree Improvement
6. Forest Economics and Policy
7. Forest Products
8. Forest Recreations and Wildlife
9. Tropical Forestry

The Congress concluded that the multiple-use concept presented new challenges and new opportunities to foresters everywhere, with great prospects for additional services to the welfare of mankind. It was not, however, a panacea which could solve all forest management problems. Often one use must be dominant and other proposed uses must not then be detrimental to the major one. Moreover, there can be disadvantages to multiple use when it is inefficiently applied. But multiple use must be recognized as an important goal of forest policies.

The Congress was attended by 1,970 participants representing 65 countries.

=== 6th World Forestry Congress: Madrid, Spain, June 1966 ===
The main theme of the Congress was "The role of forestry in the changing world economy", based on a study conducted for FAO by Wood: "World trends and prospects."

In November 1965, representatives from 114 Member States met at FAO's headquarters in Rome, under the chairmanship of Maurice Sauvé, Minister of Forestry, Canada, for the thirteenth session of the Conference, and celebrated the Twentieth Anniversary of the founding of FAO.

Reviewing the world forestry situation, the Conference set down certain considerations which must determine the scale and pattern of FAO's future activities. Among these was the following:

The forestry administrator today faces tasks considerably more complex than those faced by his predecessors. This is particularly true in developing countries. The number of institutions for higher forestry education responding to these changing needs is as yet insufficient. FAO is uniquely placed to interpret these changing needs, through its intimate contacts with national forest administrations, its working relations with forest industries, its awareness of the requirements of developing countries, and its contacts with, and responsibility for, many forestry educational institutions. On FAO therefore, lies the responsibility for promoting discussion and initiating action, by assisting forestry schools to transform their graduate and postgraduate training.

The main themes discussed in the Congress were:

1. World trends in wood resources and requirements
2. Planning the use of forest potentials
3. Institutional framework for forestry development
4. Financing forestry and forest industries development

The Congress urged governments receiving aid from outside sources to create by their own efforts and endeavours such conditions as would enable them best to profit from the technical and material assistance afforded to them. The Congress hoped these kinds of assistance could then be further expanded.

The Congress was attended by 2,700 participants representing 93 countries.

=== 7th World Forestry Congress: Buenos Aires, Argentina, October 1972 ===
The main theme of the Congress was: "Forests and socioeconomic development."

The congress examined its multi-facet challenges: how to accelerate economic and social progress whilst maintaining or enhancing the quality of the environment, recognizing that the aspiration to raise living standards often finds expression in forms that threaten the environment:

The Congress believes that the Plan of Action formulated by the United Nations Conference on the Human Environment at Stockholm in 1972 will influence forestry development throughout the world in the years to come. Recognizing that in many countries declared forest policies are not in accord with new knowledge, new preoccupations and new aspirations, the Congress considers it is now urgent to redefine forest policies in view of these new circumstances. The Congress firmly believes that, whatever the political objectives, whatever the form of economic organization, whatever the present pattern of forest land tenure, governments are responsible for planning the continuous flow of the productive, protective and social goods and services from the forest, ensuring that the physical output and environmental benefits of the forests are available for the general welfare of their peoples now and for all time. Since we live in one world, and since the forest resources of the world are unevenly distributed, national policies and plans must take account of the international context.

The central phase of the congress was devoted to technical discussions extending over the whole range of the professional interests of the participants. The main themes were:

1. Silviculturists
2. Professors, teachers and students
3. Conservationists and recreationists
4. Loggers
5. Researchers
6. Economists, administrators and planners
7. Industrialists

The congress received representation from over 80 countries. This was in part made possible by the granting of fellowships by several national technical aid agencies and by the host country.

Named as co-presidents were the heads of forest administrations in Argentina's neighbouring countries where study tours were conducted: Brazil, Chile and Uruguay.

=== 8th World Forestry Congress: Jakarta, Indonesia, 16–28 October 1978 ===
The Congress, with the theme "Forests for People", examined in depth how forestry might best serve human beings, individually and collectively. As a consequence, the Congress declared that the world's forests must be maintained, on a sustainable basis, for the use and enjoyment of all people.

The main themes analyzed by the Congress lead to:

1. Reaffirming the responsibility of governments and on their forest administrations to manage every hectare of forest to best advantage, at the interest of all world, to avoid the forest disappearance specially of the tropical forests
2. Confirming that and because of the close and direct link between quality and quantity of water on the one hand and the extent and state of the forest resource on the other, every effort should be made in order to prevent water becoming so scarce as to affect biological production adversely
3. Recognizing the gravity of world food shortages, for which an enlarged concept of multiple-use forestry is required, which encompasses the more direct production of food from forests and forest trees, as well as from wild fauna
4. Reaffirming that the world watershed management problems require major attention and awareness in view of the existent technological means to solve them
5. Recognizing that the energy crisis and the increased oil prices will have a further and potential long term implication for forestry, with the possibility that forests become an important source of energy.

Over 2,000 participants from 100 countries and 17 international organizations attended the Congress.

The Congress strongly emphasized the important role which forest products other than timber play in the life of rural communities depending on the forests. These products play a vital role in providing employment opportunities and raising the living standard of rural people, increasing the number of people supported by forests. The Congress therefore recommended that forest services and international organizations should work for the conservation, promotion and rational utilization of such products.

=== 9th World Forestry Congress: Mexico City, Mexico, 1–12 July 1985 ===
The year 1985 had been declared "International Year of the Forest" by the FAO Council. Year 1985 also marked FAO's fortieth anniversary, as well as the occasion of the Ninth World Forestry Congress in Mexico City. The theme of the Congress was "Forest Resources in the Integral Development of Society."

It emphasized the need for foresters to look beyond their own resource base to consider how forest policies can be formulated in the light of such global events as an international banking crisis. The purpose of the Congress was to develop clear lines of action that may serve as guidelines for (a) formulating national policies; (b) providing incentives and guidance to the private and government sectors; and (c) promoting international cooperation in forestry.

During the 20 sessions of the three technical commissions into which the Congress was divided, 20 agenda items were discussed, with the presentation of 22 basic documents and 160 special documents. The long list of subjects studied included:

1. The increasing destruction of tropical forests
2. The dramatic shortage of fuelwood in arid and semi-arid zones
3. The threat posed by degraded mountain areas
4. The atmospheric pollution of forests, and the deterioration of the environment in highly industrialized countries
5. The forest fires
6. The new advances in the fields of remote sensing, forest genetics, wood as a source of energy, prevention and control of forest fires, forest hydrology and industrial uses of timber.

Besides the sessions of the Congress itself, a series of satellite meetings was held, including:

- The Expert Consultation on the Role of Forestry in Combating Desertification
- The International Forum of Forestry Youth
- The meeting on Prospects for International Financing for Forestry Programmes
- The first International Symposium on Forest Fauna
- The thirteenth session of the FAO Advisory Committee on Forestry Education
- The Latin American Round Table on Forest Genetic Resources
- The Meeting of the International Society of Tropical Foresters.

Over 2,000 participants from 105 countries attended the Congress, including representatives of many national and international organizations, institutions and associations and a large number of private individuals. Amongst the participants were professional foresters, scientists, educators, students, politicians, industry officers, workers and bankers.

=== 10th World Forestry Congress: Paris, France, 17–26 September 1991 ===
The overall theme of the Congress was "Forests, a heritage for the future". Congress members confronted the difficult task of reconciling conservation of the resource base with the need for its rational use in sustainable development.

The main themes of the Congress were as follows:

1. The forest, a protective heritage
2. Conservation and protection of the forest heritage
3. Trees and forests in rural and urban land management
4. Management of the forest heritage
5. The forest heritage, an economic resource
6. Policy and institutions.

Read the following excerpt from an interview with FAO's Director-General, Edouard Saouma:

The threat to forests is worldwide and by no means confined to tropical forests. In short, we run the very real risk of undermining a resource base that is fundamental to the future development of the Earth. This must not be allowed to occur. Our responsibility extends not only to all people now living on the planet, but also to future generations. Therefore, I cannot but applaud the selection of "Forests, a heritage for the future" as the theme for the Tenth World Forestry Congress. As co-organizer of the Congress, along with the Government of France, FAO has committed substantial human and financial resources to ensuring that this will be the most widely followed Congress to date. The fruits of this effort are already evident; the number of voluntary papers was forecast as approximately 300 but more than 700 have been received. In the same vein, I would also wish to note that FAO has chosen "Trees for life" as the theme for World Food Day, 16 October 1991.

More than 2,500 forestry decision-makers from 136 countries attended the Congress.

=== 11th World Forestry Congress: Antalya, Turkey, 13–22 October 1997 ===
The general theme of the Congress was "Forestry for Sustainable Development: Towards the Twenty-first Century". The theme amply reflects the unique opportunity offered to the Congress and to the forestry sector at large to provide technical responses to the political issues raised in these fora.

In fact, as the last of these gatherings last century, the Eleventh WFC carried with it the special responsibility of summing up what had been achieved and of looking ahead to the challenges of the third millennium. Against this background, the general theme was selected in clear recognition of the importance of viewing forestry not as an isolated technical discipline, but rather as an important component of overall socio-economic development.

The technical sessions of the Congress were organized around the following main programme areas:

1. Forest and Tree Resources
2. Forests, Biological Diversity and Maintenance of Natural Heritage
3. Protective and Environmental Functions of Forests
4. Productive Functions of Forests
5. Economic Contribution of Forestry to Sustainable Development
6. Social Dimensions of Forestry's Contribution to Sustainable Development
7. Policies, Institutions and Means for Sustainable Forestry Development
8. Ecoregional Review.

The programme of the Congress presented 38 themes for discussion, each one based in a special document with a total of 1.200 voluntary papers. During the nine-day conference, delegates attended eight plenary sessions and 43 technical sessions. In addition to these sessions, three pre-Congress satellite meetings took place, an informal ministerial meeting and approximately 30 side meetings and other special events.

More than 4,400 participants from 145 countries attended the Congress, representing the scientific community, governments, international organizations, non-governmental organizations (NGOs) and the private sector.

The Antalya Declaration expressed concern about the discrepancy between the impressive progress in the development of concepts and tools, national programmes, global and regional treaties and varied partnerships among governments and international organizations, and the continued alarming rate of deforestation and degradation of forest resources, calling for a harmonization of the planet and its inhabitants' needs with the forests' potential to produce a vital support through political, institutional and government forestry strategies, also as a contribution to the UN Millennium Development Goals and other international agreements.

The Congress requested FAO to present an assessment of progress on the strategies outlined in the Final Statement to the XIII World Forestry Congress.

=== 12th World Forestry Congress: Quebec City, Canada, 21–28 September 2003 ===
The main theme of the Congress was "Forests: source of life."

The thematic areas were developed around the followings aspects:

1. Forests for people
2. Forests for the planet
3. People and forests in harmony

A total of 1,038 voluntary papers and 456 posters were received from all over the world – of which nearly 200 were selected for presentation, based on peer review by specialists in FAO and in Canadian institutions. In addition, 32 invited papers were presented, categorized as position papers and special papers. The technical programme was structured around ten plenary sessions, 38 theme sessions, poster sessions and 115 side events. Innovation with respect to preceding congresses included ten eco-regional sessions followed by round table discussions, and six open fora.

The Congress attracted 4,061 participants from more than 140 countries. The participants, representing a cross-section of society concerned with forests, included individuals from rural communities, private forest owners, labour, indigenous peoples, youth, industry, environmental and other non-governmental organizations, the scientific and academic community, various levels of government and international organizations.

The main output of the congress, the Final Statement, identifies areas of priority concern and is intended to encourage decisions and action by those involved with various aspects of forests and forestry, and in other related sectors.

The Final Statement calls for the development and dissemination of methodologies for assessing, reporting and managing the complete array of forest products; calls for action to manage forests and intensify forest landscape restoration and rehabilitation activities to support livelihoods, increase forest cover, enhance biological diversity and functionality, and minimize the impact of invasive alien species; and encourage collaborative partnerships involving women, forest owners, indigenous peoples, non-governmental organizations, local communities, industry and public agencies.

=== 13th World Forestry Congress: Buenos Aires, Argentina, 18–23 October 2009 ===
The XIII World Forestry Congress was held in Buenos Aires, Argentina, from 18 to 23 October 2009.

Under the theme "Forests in development: a vital balance" over 7,000 experts from governments, academia, research, the private sector, and non-governmental organizations came from all continents to discuss and exchange experiences over a seven-day period on a broad range of forestry related topics.

The Congress included presentations, discussions, round tables, parallel events and exhibitions, focusing on the following main issues:

- Forests and biodiversity
- Production for development
- Forests at the service of people
- Caring for our forests
- Development opportunities
- Organizing forest development
- People and forests in harmony

The Congress addressed social, ecological and economic aspects of sustainable forest management in local, regional and global contexts.

=== 14th World Forestry Congress: Durban, South Africa, 7–11 September 2015 ===
The XIV World Forestry Congress was held in South Africa, 7–11 September 2015. The central theme of WFC XIV was Forests and People: Investing in a Sustainable Future. WFC XIV emphasized the role of forests in income generation, employment creation and equity and the vital links between forests and climate change, biodiversity conservation and sustainable water resources. The six Congress sub-themes included:

- forests for socio-economic development and food security;
- building resilience with forests;
- integrating forests and other land uses;
- encouraging product innovation and sustainable trade;
- monitoring forests for better decision-making and improving governance by building capacity.

Nearly 4,000 participants from 138 countries attended the Congress. The meeting produced three outcome documents in six languages:

- The Durban Declaration: 2050 vision for forests and forestry
- Message on Climate Change from the XIV World Forestry Congress
- Message from XIV World Forestry Congress to the United Nations General Assembly Summit for the adoption of the 2030 Agenda for Sustainable Development

Over 3,500 people from 120 countries contributed 825 technical papers and 269 posters. Thirty percent of the papers were from Africa and 30 percent written by women as lead authors.

The summary brief Foresters call for action: Future land management needs better integration of sectors listed ten key recommendations and action points from the Congress.

The Food and Agriculture Organization of the United Nations released key findings of an assessment of the world's forest resources in the report Global Forest Resources Assessment 2015.

During the Congress, Ugandan community leader Gertrude Kabusimbi Kenyangi was awarded the Collaborative Partnership on Forests 2015 Wangari Maathai 'Forest Champions' Award in recognition of her efforts to promote the conservation and sustainable use of her country's forest resources. Given in recognition of outstanding efforts to improve and sustain forests, the award was established in 2012 by the Collaborative Partnership on Forests (CPF), which is chaired by FAO. Its name honours the memory of Wangari Maathai, the Kenyan environmentalist and the first African woman to win a Nobel Peace Prize for her contribution to sustainable development, democracy and peace.

=== 15th World Forestry Congress: Coex, Seoul, Republic of Korea, 2–6 May 2022 ===
The fifteenth Congress was hosted by the Government of the Republic of Korea, in Seoul, from 2 to 6 May 2022. At the world’s largest gathering on forests, 15,000 participants from over 160 countries endorsed the Seoul Forest Declaration to convey the urgent need for action to achieve a green, healthy and resilient future with forests. The Congress also heard the Youth Call for Action and the Ministerial Call on Sustainable Wood.

Congress outcomes were summarized in Building a green, healthy and resilient future with forests.

Activist Cécile Ndjebet, of Cameroon, won the 2022 Wangari Maathai Forest Champions Award in recognition of her outstanding contribution to preserving forests and improving the lives of people who depend on them. Established by the Collaborative Partnership on Forests in 2012 in memory of Kenyan environmentalist and Nobel Peace Prize winner Wangari Maathai, the Forest Champions Award recognises inspiring individuals who have helped preserve, restore and sustainably manage forests.

FAO also released the 2022 State of the World's Forests which sets out three pathways for halting deforestation; restoring degraded land and expanding agroforestry and sustainably using forests and building green value chains.

== See also ==
- Bioproduct
- Conservation biology
- Forestry Information Centre
- International Forestry Students' Association
- Sustainability
- Unasylva, FAO's Forestry journal
- Wildcrafting
