= Aquatic science =

Multidisciplinary study of freshwater and marine ecosystems

Aquatic science is the study of the various bodies of water that make up our planet including oceanic and freshwater environments. Aquatic scientists study the movement of water, the chemistry of water, aquatic organisms, aquatic ecosystems, the movement of materials in and out of aquatic ecosystems, and the use of water by humans, among other things. Aquatic scientists examine current processes as well as historic processes, and the water bodies that they study can range from tiny areas measured in millimeters to full oceans. Moreover, aquatic scientists work in Interdisciplinary groups. For example, a physical oceanographer might work with a biological oceanographer to understand how physical processes, such as tropical cyclones or rip currents, affect organisms in the Atlantic Ocean. Chemists and biologists, on the other hand, might work together to see how the chemical makeup of a certain body of water affects the plants and animals that reside there. Aquatic scientists can work to tackle global problems such as global oceanic change and local problems, such as trying to understand why a drinking water supply in a certain area is polluted.

There are two main fields of study that fall within the field of aquatic science. These fields of study include oceanography and limnology.

== Oceanography ==
Oceanography refers to the study of the physical, chemical, and biological characteristics of oceanic environments. Oceanographers study the history, current condition, and future of the planet's oceans. They also study marine life and ecosystems, ocean circulation, plate tectonics, the geology of the seafloor, and the chemical and physical properties of the ocean.

Oceanography is interdisciplinary. For example, there are biological oceanographers and marine biologists. These scientists specialize in marine organisms. They study how these organisms develop, their relationship with one another, and how they interact and adapt to their environment. Biological oceanographers and marine biologists often utilize field observations, computer models, laboratory experiments, or field experiments for their research. In the field of oceanography, there are also chemical oceanographers and marine chemists. These scientist's areas of focus are the composition of seawater. They study the processes and cycles of seawater, as well as how seawater chemically interacts with the atmosphere and seafloor. Some examples of jobs that chemical oceanographers and marine chemists perform are analyzing seawater components, exploring the effects pollutants have on seawater, and analyzing the effects that chemical processes have on marine animals. In addition, a chemical oceanographer might use chemistry to better understand how ocean currents move seawater and how the ocean affects the climate. They might also search for ocean resources that could be beneficial, such as products that have medicinal properties.

The field of oceanography also consists of geological oceanographers and marine geologists who study the ocean floor and how its mountains, canyons, and valleys were formed. Geological oceanographers and marine geologists use sampling to examine the history of sea-floor spreading, plate tectonics, thermohaline circulation, and climates. In addition, they study undersea volcanos as well as mantle (geology) and hydrothermal circulation. Their research helps us to better understand the events that led to the creation of oceanic basins and how the ocean interacts with the seabed. Lastly, under the field of oceanography, there are physical oceanographers. Physical oceanographers are experts on the physical conditions and processes that occur naturally in the ocean. These include waves, currents, eddies, gyres, tides, and coastal erosion. Physical oceanographers also study topics such as the transmission of light and sound through water and the effects that the ocean has on weather and climate. All of these fields are intertwined. In order for an oceanographer to succeed in their field, they need to have an adequate understanding of other related sciences, such as biology, chemistry, and physics.

== Limnology ==
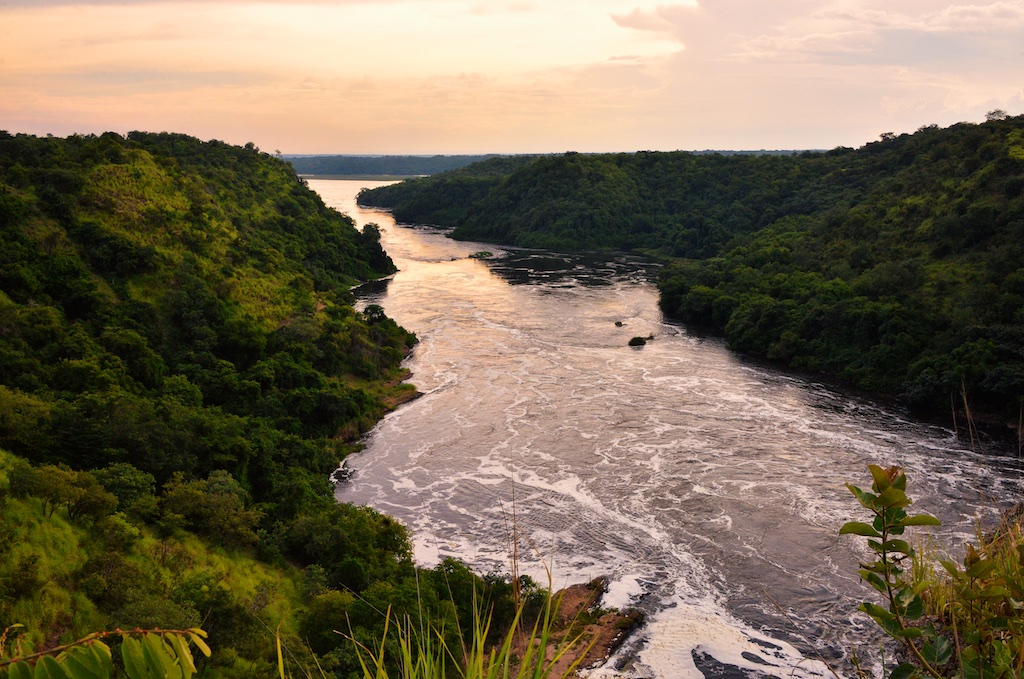
Nile River

Limnology is the study of freshwater environments, such as rivers, streams, lakes, reservoirs, groundwater, and marshlands. Limnologists work to understand the various natural and man made factors that affect our natural water bodies such as pesticides, temperature, runoff, and aquatic life. For example, a limnologist might study the effects of pesticides on the temperature of a lake or they might seek to understand why a certain species of fish in the Nile River is declining.

In order to increase their understanding of what they are studying, limnologists employ three main study techniques. The first study technique has to do with observations. Limnologists make descriptive observations of conditions and note how those conditions have changed over time. These observations allow limnologists to form theories and hypotheses. The second study technique that limnologists use has to do with experimentation. Limnologists conduct controlled experiments under laboratory conditions in order to further their understanding of the impact of small, individual changes in the ecosystem. Lastly, limnologists come up with predictions. After they have conducted their experiments, they can apply what they have learned to known data about the wider ecosystem and make predictions about the natural environment.

Within the field of limnology, there are more specific areas of study. One of those areas of study is ecology, particularly the ecology of water systems. The ecology of water systems focuses on the organisms that live in freshwater environments and how they are affected by changes in their habitat. For example, a limnologist specializing in ecology could study how chemical or temperature changes in a body of water inhibit or support new organic growth. Another aspect that they may examine are the effects of a nonnative species on native populations of aquatic life. Most ecological limnologists conduct their studies in laboratory settings, where their hypotheses can be tested, verified, and controlled. Another area of study under limnology is biology. Limnologists who specialize in the biology field only study the living aquatic organisms that are present in a certain freshwater environment. They aim to understand various aspects of the organisms, such as their history, their life cycles, and their populations. These scientists study living organisms in order to support the proper management of fresh bodies of water and their ecosystems.

== Aquatic environments ==
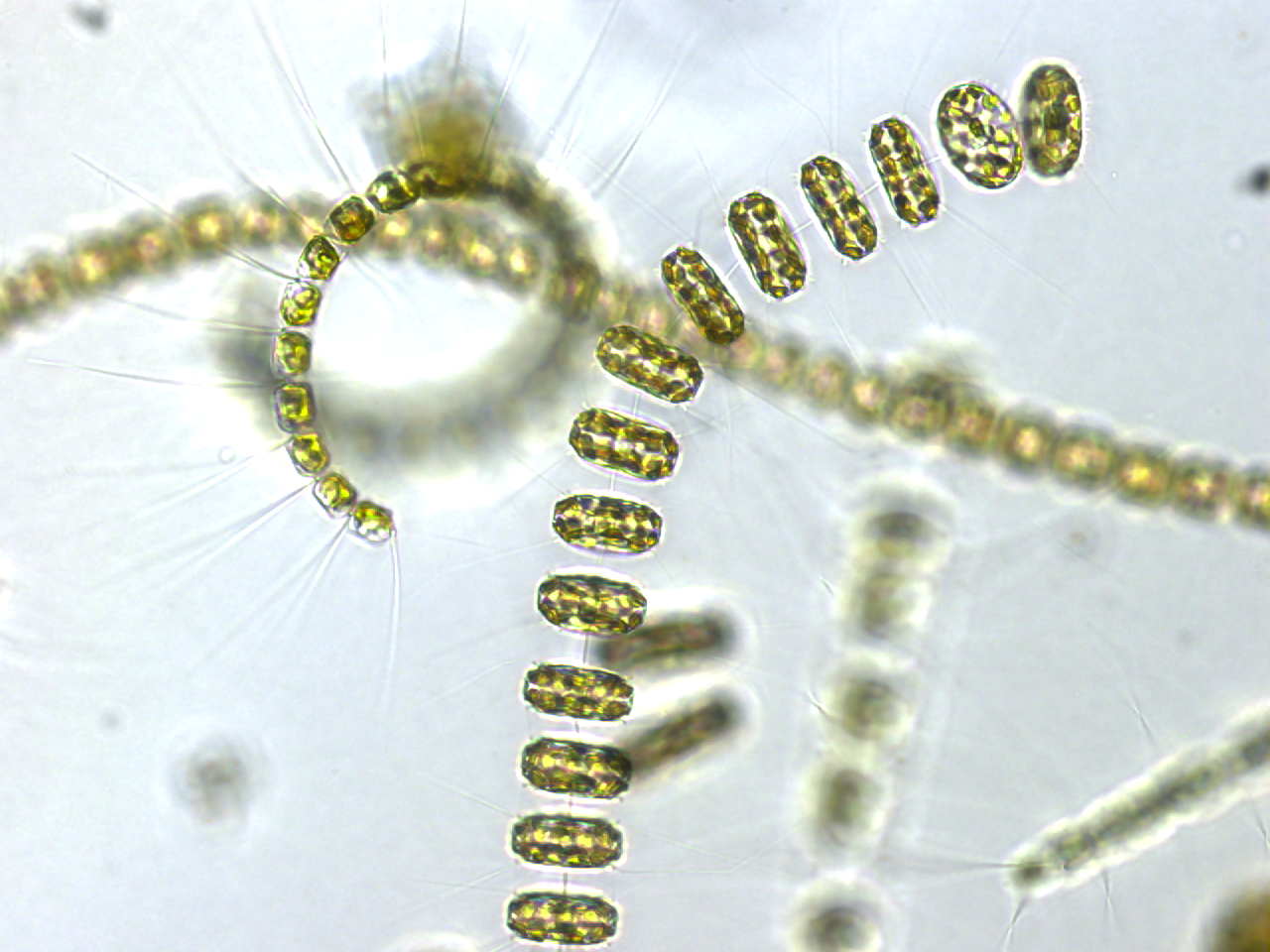
Phytoplankton

Most aquatic environments contain both plants and animals. Aquatic plants are plants that grow in water. Examples of aquatic plants are waterlilies, floating hearts, the lattice plant, seagrass, and phytoplankton. Aquatic plants can be rooted in mud, such as the lotus flower or they can be found floating on the surface of the water such as the water hyacinth. Aquatic plants provide oxygen, food, and shelter for many aquatic animals. In addition, underwater vegetation provides several species of marine animals with grounds to spawn, nurse, take refuge, and forage.

Seagrass, for example, is a vital source of food for commercial and recreational fish. Seagrass stabilizes sediments, produces the organic material that small aquatic invertebrates need, and adds oxygen to the water. Phytoplankton are also an important class of aquatic plant. Phytoplankton are similar to terrestrial plants in that they require chlorophyll and sunlight to grow. Most Phytoplankton are buoyant, floating in the upper part of the ocean, where sunlight penetrates the water. There are two main classes of phytoplankton: dinoflagellates and diatoms. Dinoflagellates have a whip-like tail called a Flagellum, which they use to move through the water, and their bodies are covered with complex shells. Diatoms, on the other hand, have shells, but they are made of a different substance. Instead of relying on flagella to travel through the water, diatoms use ocean currents. Both classes of phytoplankton provide food for a variety of sea creatures, such as shrimp, snails, and jellyfish.

Both aquatic animals and plants contribute to the health of the environment and to the quality of human life. Humans depend on their ecological functions for survival, including the role of surface waters and their inhabitants in helping to process waste products. Aquatic plants and animals also provide humans with necessities such as medicine, food, energy, shelter, and several raw materials. Today, more than 40% of medicines are derived from aquatic plants and animals. Moreover, aquatic wildlife are an important source of food for many people. In addition, aquatic wildlife is a big source of atmospheric oxygen and plays a big role in preventing humans from being affected by new diseases, pests, predators, food shortages, and global climate change.

== Aquatic animals ==
Aquatic animals are organisms that spend most of their life underwater. These animals consist of crustaceans, reptiles, mollusks, aquatic birds, aquatic insects, and even starfish and coral. Aquatic animals unfortunately face a lot of threats, with most of these threats resulting from human behaviors. One major threat that aquatic animals face is overfishing. Scientists have figured out a way to replenish the species of fish that humans have over hunted by creating marine protected areas or fish regeneration zones These fish regeneration zones help protect their ecosystems and help rebuild their abundance. Another threat that aquatic animals face is pollution, particularly coastal pollution. This pollution is caused by industrial agriculture. These agricultural practices result in reactive nitrogen and phosphorus being poured into the rivers, which then gets transported to the ocean. These chemicals have created what is known as "dead zones" which is when there is less oxygen in the water. Moreover, another detrimental threat that aquatic animals face is the threat of habitat destruction. This can be exemplified with the clearing of mangrove forests for shrimp production and the scraping of underwater mountain ranges through deep-sea trawling. Other threats that aquatic animals face are global warming and acidification. Global warming is responsible for killing the algae that keeps coral alive, forcing species out of their natural habitats and into new areas, and for causing sea levels to rise. Acidification, on the other hand, is decreasing the pH level of oceans. High acidity levels in the water are preventing marine-calcifying organisms, such as coral, from forming shells.

== World Aquatic Animal Day ==
Although there are not many currently existing formal holidays celebrating aquatic science, a new one has been made called World Aquatic Animal Day. World Aquatic Animal Day was created on April 3, 2020, as a way to raise awareness for these often forgotten animals. The holiday begun as a project of the Aquatic Animal Law Initiative and the Animal Law Clinic at the Lewis & Clark Law School as part of the Center for Animal Law Studies. In addition to raising awareness for these animals, this holiday aims to increase our appreciation and understanding of them. Under this holiday, the definition of aquatic animals is not limited to fish.

== Recent Research and Developments in Aquatic Science ==
Current studies in aquatic science have expanded immensely to identify environmental concerns and new recovery practices. Several multidisciplinary studies have promoted an understanding of stressors and interventions affecting aquatic systems worldwide.

Microplastic pollution is a notable concern. Microplastics are widespread in marine and freshwater ecosystems and have been found to affect a wide range of aquatic organisms. Microplastics have been shown to alter feeding behavior, growth rates, and reproductive health among species. Additionally, microplastics can adsorb and release toxic chemicals, increasing their ecological effects.

Another critical issue is the effect of combining environmental stressors such as; global warming, eutrophication, and pesticide runoff on aquatic microbial communities. Experiments have shown that an accumulation of protozoans, which play major roles in nutrient cycling and food web stability, are particularly vulnerable to these combined stressors. The cumulative effects can lead to alterations in the community structure, loss of biodiversity, and impaired ecosystem function.

Regarding restoration measures, aquatic vegetation rehabilitation has been demonstrated to be an effective approach to ecosystem recovery. Research conducted in Caizi Lakes, China, showed that the restoration of aquatic vegetation led to improved water quality and increased phytoplankton diversity.

Mathematical modeling has also become increasingly important in aquatic science. With the use of Ulam–Hyers–Rassias stability techniques, researchers have developed models that simulate the impacts of global warming on aquatic ecosystems. These models provide predictions of how long-term climatic variability may affect biodiversity and productivity.

In coastal regions, artificial habitats are increasingly used to rehabilitate marine biodiversity and support fisheries. Structures, such as artificial reefs, provide habitats for marine organisms and can help offset habitat loss caused by coastal development and overfishing. When properly designed and managed, artificial habitats can enhance ecosystem services and support long-term ecological sustainability.

Furthermore, aquatic ecosystem health is being quantified more and more using new paradigms that consider the needs of ecosystem services. Rather than quantifying ecosystems solely on physical or biological measures, these methods analyze the capacity of ecosystems to provide services such as water filtration, habitat, and recreation. This shift emphasizes the functional integrity of ecosystems and supports more holistic and adaptive management practices.

Together, these studies reflect the future of aquatic science, which increasingly intersects with climate science, pollution research, and ecological restoration.

== See also ==
- GIS and aquatic science
- Pan-American Journal of Aquatic Sciences
