= The Widening Gyre =

The Widening Gyre may refer to:

== Literature and publications ==
- "...the widening gyre", part of the first line of the W. B. Yeats poem "The Second Coming"
- Batman: The Widening Gyre, a 2009 Batman limited series from Kevin Smith
- The Widening Gyre (novel), a 1983 novel by Robert B. Parker
- The Widening Gyre, the original planned title of the John Scalzi novel The Collapsing Empire

== Music ==
- The Widening Gyre, a 1999 symphony by composer Anthony Ritchie
- "The Widening Gyre", a piece on Idiot Flesh's 1990 album Tales of Instant Knowledge and Sure Death
- The Widening Gyre (album), a 2015 studio album by Irish folk music band Altan

== Television ==
- "The Widening Gyre", the 40th episode of the animated series Ben 10: Ultimate Alien
- "The Widening Gyre", an episode of the TV show Andromeda
- Widening Gyre (Sons of Anarchy), an episode of the TV show Sons of Anarchy
- "The Widening Gyre", an episode of the TV show Haven

== Other uses ==
- "The Widening Gyre", a a steampunk setting for the Hero System

== See also ==
- Gyre (disambiguation)
