= USNS Gyre =

Americal oceanographic research vessel

History

United States
- Name: Gyre
- Builder: Halter Marine, Inc. New Orleans, Louisiana
- Laid down: 9 October 1972
- Launched: 23 May 1973
- Acquired: by the U.S. Navy, 14 November 1973
- In service: as RV Gyre (T-AGOR-21), date not known
- Out of service: 17 August 1992
- Stricken: 17 August 1992 (ownership to Texas A&M)
- Identification: IMO number: 7318999; MMSI number: 577275000; Callsign: KJCL; YJTX5
- Status: Active research vessel with TDI-Brooks Intl since 2005
- Notes: Transferred from Navy to Texas A&M, owned and operated by university until December 2005. Returned to the U.S. Maritime Administration and sold to TDI-Brooks Intl 2005.

General characteristics
- Class & type: Gyre-class oceanographic research ship
- Tonnage: 292 GRT
- Displacement: 946 tons
- Length: 182 ft (55.5 m)
- Beam: 36 ft (11.0 m)
- Draft: 12.5 ft (3.8 m)
- Propulsion: two Caterpillar Inc. 398D diesel engines, reduction gear drive to two Liaaen variable-pitch propellers
- Speed: 9.5 kn (17.6 km/h; 10.9 mph) cruising; 11.8 kn (21.9 km/h; 13.6 mph) maximum
- Range: 8,000 nmi (15,000 km; 9,200 mi) at cruising speed
- Endurance: 60 days
- Complement: 10 civilian mariners, 23 scientific party

Gyre (T-AGOR-21), best known as RV Gyre, was the lead ship of her class of oceanographic research ships acquired by the U.S. Navy in 1973 for assignment to the University-National Oceanographic Laboratory System (UNOLS) fleet of Navy owned ships. Gyre was operated by the Texas A&M University School of Oceanography as part of the Navy owned UNOLS fleet until stricken 17 August 1992 and transferred to the university under a program transferring ships to states, schools and other public institutions. The university operated the ship until sale in December 2005.

Gyre was purchased by TDI-Brooks International, Inc., flagged in Vanuatu, Port Vila and operated as a for hire research and survey vessel with particular suitability for undersea oil and gas related work.

== Construction & characteristics ==
Gyre was built in New Orleans, LA, by Halter Marine, Inc. and was laid down on 9 October 1972 and launched on 23 May 1973. She was delivered to the Navy 14 November 1973 and placed in service as RV Gyre (T-AGOR-21). The ship was the lead of the AGOR-21 class research vessels. The class was to be specifically designed to reduce cost of both acquisition and life cycle costs by adopting commercial standards and practices in design.

The ship was 182 ft (55.5 m) length overall, 36 ft (11.0 m) beam, 12.5 ft (3.8 m) draft, 292 gross register tons (GRT) with a displacement tonnage of 946. The two shafts were driven by geared diesel engines for a cruising speed of 9.5 kn (17.6 km/h; 10.9 mph), maximum speed of 11.8 kn (21.9 km/h; 13.6 mph). Gyre had a hydraulic electric bow thruster. With a capacity of 89,000 US gallons (340,000 L) of diesel oil the ship had a range of 8,000 nmi (15,000 km; 9,200 mi) at cruising speed and endurance of sixty days limited by food. The ship was operated with five officers and five crew with a scientific complement of twenty-three.

Gyre had wet and dry laboratories with a capability to carry an 8 by 8 by 20 ft (2.4 by 2.4 by 6.1 m) instrument van on deck. For equipment handling and operation there were two "A" frames of 30,000 pounds (14,000 kg) capacity, two cranes with 7,000 pounds (3,200 kg) capacity and three oceanographic/hydrographic/trawl winches. Raytheon shallow and deep water sounding systems were installed and the ship had a capability for seismic profiling.

== University assignment ==
Gyre was leased to the Texas A&M University School of Oceanography as part of the University-National Oceanographic Laboratory System (UNOLS) fleet of Navy owned ships, based in Galveston operating with call sign KJCL. The ship had undergone modifications in 1980 and 1984 and then struck from Navy list in August 1992. The university acquired the vessel by transfer from the Navy and continued to operate Gyre as part of the UNOLS fleet with National Science Foundation (NSF) support for research. The vessel was sold in December 2005.

== Operations ==
The university operated Gyre until 31 August 2005. At that time maintenance of an older ship and federal research budget cuts for research made operation uneconomical. The university was left without a ship capable of carrying twenty-three researchers and sustained voyages in the Western Gulf of Mexico. In 2005 Gyre only made nine cruises with 76 total days at sea compared to fifteen and 194 days at sea in 2000. The 2000 operations involved ten days in support of NSF requirements with the rest supporting state, Navy, Minerals Management Service (MMS), and other authorized federal and private projects. The MMS used Gyre as the research platform for The Deep Gulf of Mexico Benthos (DGoMB) project studying impact of oil and gas operations on the sea floor biota.

== Commercial operation ==
Gyre is currently operated by TDI-Brooks International, Inc., College Station, Texas, flagged in Vanuatu, Port Vila advertised for work out of Mexico, Northern South America and West Africa. Gyre is identified with IMO number 7318999, MMSI number 577275000, and call sign YJYX5 and noted as particularly well suited for oil and gas exploration and off shore production support. The ship now has four laboratory or work spaces and quarters for nine crew and twenty six technical staff.
