= Unasylva =

- Cover of Volume 1, No. 1
- Discipline: Forestry
- Language: English, French, Spanish
- Edited by: C. Legault

Publication details
- History: 1947–present
- Publisher: Food and Agriculture Organization of the United Nations (Italy)
- Frequency: 1-2 issues per year

Standard abbreviations
- ISO 4: Unasylva

Indexing
- ISSN: 0041-6436 (print); 1564-3697 (web)
- LCCN: 51017005
- OCLC no.: 145345902

Links
- Journal homepage

Unasylva is a multilingual international journal of forestry and forest industries published by the Food and Agriculture Organization of the United Nations (FAO). Produced in separate English, French, and Spanish editions, Unasylva covers all aspects of forestry: policy and planning; conservation and management of forest-based plants and animals; rural socio-economic development, including food security; species improvement; industrial development; international trade; and environmental considerations, including the role of forests and trees in maintaining a sustainable base for agricultural production as well as the effects of environmental change on forestry. Unasylva presents news about forest science and policy to a broad range of readers – policymakers, forest managers, technicians, researchers, students, teachers.

== Indexing ==
Unasylva is indexed by the Abstract Bulletin of the Institute of Paper Chemistry, the Bibliography of Agriculture, and Predicasts. Its h-index is 15. The journal is also referenced in Scopus, an abstract and citation database of peer-reviewed literature. In a 2007 poll, professional forestry organizations in Australia ranked Unasylva in the 'A' group (80-95 percentile) of all forestry journals.

== History ==
First published in 1947, Unasylva is FAO’s longest running periodical. The journal documents the history of FAO’s activities in forestry. Every FAO Director-General and every head of the FAO Forestry Division, which later became the Forestry Department, has contributed to Unasylva. Authors of the more than 1,000 articles published include presidents of countries, heads of national forest services, field workers and university professors. The results of hundreds of FAO field projects have been recorded in these pages.

As FAO membership has grown, from 48 countries – mostly in the industrialized world – to 191 (in 2012), so has the emphasis within Unasylva changed, from wood production and wood technology to sustainability concepts and awareness of forestry’s social role. The first few decades emphasized assistance to Europe in the recovery after the Second World War. Authors in the early years were predominantly European and North American men. By the 1980s, the balance was changing as women increasingly entered the field of forestry, and contributions from developing countries were increasingly welcomed. Today’s Unasylva is diverse and global; each issue, to the extent possible, has authors, male and female, from every region of the world and from a variety of academic and research institutions, other UN agencies, non-governmental organizations and civil society. In 2000, FAO published The complete collection of Unasylva 1947–2000, with 51 volumes (203 issues) in a compact disc form.

== See also ==
- List of forestry journals
- World Forestry Congress
