= Aquatic Sciences and Fisheries Abstracts =

- Producer: ProQuest for the Aquatic Sciences and Fisheries Information System
- History: 1970–present

Access
- Providers: ProQuest
- Cost: Subscriptions

Coverage
- Disciplines: aquatic science
- Record depth: Index & abstract
- Geospatial coverage: Worldwide

Links
- Website: www.fao.org/fishery/asfa/en

Aquatic Sciences and Fisheries Abstracts is an abstracting and indexing service covering aquatic science and its subfields. It is maintained by the Food and Agriculture Organization (FAO) of the United Nations. It replaced the previous Current Bibliography for Aquatic Sciences and Fisheries (FAO) and Aquatic Biology Abstracts.
