= Sprawlgangs & Megacorps =

Role-playing game supplement

Cover art By Janet Aulisio, 1990

Sprawlgangs & Megacorps is a supplement published by Iron Crown Enterprises (I.C.E.) in 1990 for the cyberpunk near-future science fiction role-playing game Cyberspace.

== Contents ==
Sprawlgangs & Megacorps is a supplement describing 20 street gangs known as "sprawlgangs", 16 ruthless megacorporations that wield enormous power, four law enforcement organizations, one terrorist organization, and seven notable non-player characters.

== Publication history ==
I.C.E. published the cyberpunk role-playing game Cyberspace in 1989. The game's first supplement, Sprawlgangs & Megacorps, is a 64-page book written by Terry Amthor and Kevin Barrett, with both interior and cover art by Janet Aulisio.

== Reception ==
Stephan Wieck reviewed the product in the October–November 1990 issue of White Wolf. He stated that the product "is a good sourcebook filled with stuff that can be thrown right into a cyberpunk campaign, and while providing a gamemaster with specific elements for his campaign, the book also gives the reader an overview of many elements of the Cyberspace game world." Wieck rated it at 4 of 5 points.

== Reviews ==
- Games Review, Issue 9 (June 1990, p. 60)
