= Gorgoroth (Middle-earth Role Playing) =

Artwork by Angus McBride, 1990

Gorgoroth is a supplement published by Iron Crown Enterprises (ICE) in 1990 for the fantasy role-playing game Middle-earth Role Playing (MERP), which is itself based on the works of J.R.R. Tolkien.

== Contents ==
=== Background ===
In Tolkien's published history of Middle Earth, following the fall of Numenor, Sauron realized that Gondor, the kingdom established by Elendil and his son Isildur, would rival lost Numenor in power and prestige, and created the country of Mordor to contest Gondor's might. The Plateau of Gorgoroth lay in the northwest corner of Mordor, and it was here, near the base of the volcano Mount Doom that Sauron established his fortress of Barad-dur.

=== Setting ===
Gorgoroth is a campaign setting which details the Plateau of Gorgoroth and its surrounding terrain and peoples so that a gamemaster can set MERP adventures within these lands. The book is divided into four main parts:

Part 1: Guidelines for the gamemaster

Part 2: Mordor

- Geography, ecology, inhabitants, notable personalities, notable locations, and eight adventure hooks set in various time periods

Part 3: Locations of interest outside Mordor

- Special emphasis on the mining settlement of Bar Lithryn in the Ash Mountains, including four full adventures set in the settlement.

Part 4: Campaign Aids

- Creating an orc player character, languages of Gorgoroth, and gamemaster playing aids

== Publication history ==
ICE published the licensed game Middle Earth Role-Playing in 1982, and then released many supplements for it over the next 17 years, until the Tolkien Estate withdrew their license in 1999. Gorgoroth, a 144-page softcover book with removable color map published by Iron Crown Enterprises in 1990, was written by John Crowdis, Keith Robley, Anders Blixt, Pete Fenlon, Coleman Charlton, and Jessica Ney, with interior art by Darrell Midgette and Liz Danforth, cartography by William Hyde, Jennifer Kleine, Kevin William, and Pete Fenlon, and cover art by Angus McBride.

== Reception ==
Herb Petro reviewed the product in the December 1990 – January 1991 issue of White Wolf. He stated that "I found Gorgoroth an excellent product and plan to run my next Middle Earth campaign in Mordor." He rated it overall at a perfect 5 of 5 possible points.
