= Heike Kubasch =

American role-playing game designer

- Occupation: Game designer

Heike A. Kubasch is an American game designer who has worked primarily on role-playing games.

== Career ==
Heike Kubasch was one of the original principals of Iron Crown Enterprises, along with Pete Fenlon, S. Coleman Charlton, Richard H. Britton, Terry K. Amthor, Bruce Shelley, Bruce Neidlinger, Kurt Fischer, and Olivia Fenlon. Kubasch wrote Angmar (1982), the first Middle-earth campaign supplement book published by ICE as a Rolemaster supplement.

Kubasch later became the President of Mjolnir LLC, with Bruce Neidlinger as CEO. Kubasch and Tim Dugger authored the game HARP: High Adventure Role Playing (2003) for Mjolnir.

Her Dungeons & Dragons design work includes Monstrous Compendium Volume 1 (1989) and Monstrous Compendium Volume 2 (1989).
