= Lord of the Rings Adventure Game =

Role-playing game based on works of J.R.R. Tolkien

- Cover art by Angus McBride
- Designers: Jessica M. Ney and Pete Fenlon
- Publishers: Iron Crown Enterprises
- Publication: 1991
- Genres: Tolkien fantasy
- Systems: unique system

Lord of the Rings Adventure Game is a fantasy role-playing game published by Iron Crown Enterprises (I.C.E.) in 1991 under license from Tolkien Enterprises that is based on the writings of J. R. R. Tolkien, specifically The Lord of the Rings and The Hobbit.

== Description ==
Lord of the Rings Adventure Game (LOR) is a simple, "level-less" role-playing game designed to help introduce new players and gamemasters to role-playing, and was intended as a stepping stone to I.C.E.'s more complex Middle Earth Role Playing (MERP) game. The boxed set contains a 32-page rulebook, a large color map of Northwest Middle Earth, a black & white map of Bree and environs, and cardboard characters with stands. A 64-page booklet contains an introductory scenario, "Dawn Comes Early", in which the adventurers must rescue a companion and deal with a pair of trolls. They also encounter Gandalf.

=== Setting ===
LOR is set in Tolkien's Middle-earth in 3017 of the Third Age, between the adventures of Bilbo Baggins in The Hobbit and the events of The Lord of the Rings. The player characters can interact with the main characters of The Lord of the Rings, but do not take direct roles in the events.

=== System ===
LOR uses a simple "level-less" system that requires only two 6-sided dice to resolve skill checks and combat, an expansion of the even simpler rules used by I.C.E. for its Middle Earth Quest adventure gamebooks. Attributes and Skills rated between -5 and +5. Skills can be modified to a rating above or below these limits (i.e. under -5 or over +5). An attack roll consists of rolling two dice, adding the attacker's skill rating and appropriate weapon rating and subtracting the defender's defense and armor rating. The result is looked up on a table to determine success or failure, and if it is a success, how much damage is sustained.

=== Character generation ===
Players choose a profession and race from a limited list:

- Scout (hobbit or elf)
- Warrior (human, dwarf or elf)
- Ranger (human or half-elf)
- Bard (human or elf)

The player randomly determines the character's three attributes (Strength, Agility and Intelligence), and chooses skills from six categories (Melee, Missile, General, Subterfuge, Perception, Magic). If the character is a spellcaster, the number of spells and their power are quite limited.

== Publication history ==
In the early 1980s, I.C.E. acquired the license to publish games based on Tolkien's works and released the complex role-playing game Middle Earth Role Playing as well as the Tolkien Quest line of books (later known as the Middle-earth Quest books). In 1994, I.C.E. also produced a simple introductory role-playing game, Lord of the Rings Adventure Game, which was released as a boxed set. The game was designed by Coleman Charlton and Jessica M. Ney-Grim, with cover art by Angus McBride, interior art by Marco Aidala, Liz Danforth, Ron Hill, and Jaime Lombardo, and cartography by Eric Hotz and J.M. Ney.

I.C.E. published two books of scenarios, Darker Than the Darkness (1991) and Over the Misty Mountains Cold (1993), and planned another two books of scenarios, but these were never published.

== Reception ==
In Issue 184 of Dragon (August 1992), Rick Swan liked the "attractive components", and thought the rules had "a congenial style that rightfully assumes the reader has no previous experience with role-playing." Swan also liked the "exciting, atmospheric scenario" that was included with the game, noting that it was "structured as a series of simple scenes that include numerous examples of play and plenty of GameMaster Notes to guide the first-time referee." Although Swan felt the magic system was "smooth and straightforward", he thought the overall rules "lean a little too hard on statistics and modifiers, which could easily scare off players with a phobia for numbers." Swan concluded by giving this game a rating of 4 out of 5, saying, "Quibbles aside, roleplaying novices in general and Tolkien fans in particular ought to be tickled pink by the Lord of the Rings game ... Best of all, it successfully captures the fairy-tale ambiance of the novels."

In Issue 2 of RPG Review (December 2008), Lev Lafayette blamed LOR as the first of four products that caused the downfall of I.C.E. Despite the fact that LOR "was not a bad game at all", Lafayette contended that the game, originally envisioned as a stepping stone to MERP, in fact "just simply didn't sell and the final two scenarios planned for a six-part interlinked story were never released. Rather than acting as a bridge to the more complex MERP, it ended up diluting that market."
