= Bladestorm (board game) =

Fantasy combat board game

- Cover art by Angus McBride
- Designers: Coleman Charlton; Tim Taylor; Peter Fenlon; John Ruemmler
- Illustrators: Angus McBride; Michael Hernandez; Sandy Collors
- Publishers: Iron Crown Enterprises
- Publication: 1990
- Genres: Fantasy

Bladestorm, subtitled "Fantasy Miniatures Gaming in a Dark Chaotic World", is a combat rules system published by Iron Crown Enterprises (I.C.E.) in 1990 that regulates fantasy miniatures skirmish combat.

== Description ==
Bladestorm is a set of rules for fantasy miniatures skirmishes at 1:1 scale (one figurine representing one character), and also includes a sourcebook, and a booklet of scenarios.

=== Components ===
Bladestorm comes as a boxed set containing:

- 64-page rulebook
- 160-page sourcebook
- 32-page scenario book
- 8-page miniature painting manual
- 32-page color guidebook
- 22" x 17" double-sided color map
- dice

=== Character generation ===
Each player must provide a miniature. In the Basic Game this character has attribute ratings for Movement, Melee Attack, Melee Damage, Defense and Endurance.

=== Combat ===
If an attacker is within range of an opponent, it can attack using a number of six-sided dice equal to the attacking character's Melee Attack rating; one or more of the dice must exceed the defender's Defense rating in order to inflict damage. Damage is simply equal to the highest die roll that exceeded the defender's Defense rating.

=== Magic ===
Most spells in the game are designed for mass combat, and are cast using a spell point system. Wizards with Power Hues can accumulate additional spell points if the sky turns a particular color during combat. The title of the game is taken from one of the most powerful spells, bladestorm, which takes the form of a massive tornado or an expanding ring that inflicts critical damage on friend and foe alike.

== Publication history ==
I.C.E. published both a fantasy role-playing system and a science fiction role-playing system in the mid-1980s. Both systems were complex, and any combat with more than a few characters became hours of work to resolve. In an effort to simplify the rules for skirmish combats involving more than a few characters, I.C.E. released Bladestorm in 1990, a rule system developed by Coleman Charlton. The accompanying sourcebook was designed by Tim Taylor, Peter Fenlon, and John Ruemmler. Interior illustrations were by Michael Hernandez, Sandy Collora, and Ellisa Martin, and cover art was by Angus McBride.

I.C.E. approached Grenadier Miniatures to design and cast a set of 25 mm fantasy miniatures for Bladestorm. I.C.E. also released the Bladestorm Bestiary in 1991 to give players a variety of opponents to fight.

== Reception ==
In the February 1992 edition of Dragon (Issue #178), Rick Swan called the game "a remarkable design that not only features an elegant set of game mechanics but a fully developed fantasy world in which to use them." Swan admired the combat system, calling it, "quick and simple, minimizing the need for charts and complicated formulas", and thought that the magic system was "superb". He also liked the Advanced rules, saying that they "build on the concepts introduced in the Basic game, adding interesting twists instead of needless complications." Swan did think that the game was best designed for small engagements rather than large-scale combats, and advised avoiding the "cumbersome" optional rules. He concluded by giving the game a rating of 4 out of 6, saying, "the Bladestorm game is terrific fun, a stylish integration of clever mechanics and sparkling background material, highlighted by the best mass-combat magic system on the market... Skillfully written, richly detailed, and endlessly replayable, there may be a better self-contained fantasy miniatures game than the Bladestorm rules, but I've never seen it."

Tony Den, writing for Black Gate, called Bladestorm "an innovative miniatures fantasy game ... Ostensibly a standalone set of rules that could be dropped into virtually any fantasy role playing game, Bladestorm facilitated larger skirmishes that would otherwise be too cumbersome to play. To be successful it had to be simple, easy to adapt and have some clever mechanics that players would want to adopt."
