= Edge-On =

Tabletop role-playing game supplement

- Cover art by Janet Aulisio-Dannheiser, 1990
- Author: Terry Amthor
- Genre: Role-playing game
- Publisher: Iron Crown Enterprises
- Publication date: 1990
- Media type: book

Edge-On is an adventure published by Iron Crown Enterprises (ICE) in 1990 for the near-future science fiction role-playing game Cyberspace.

== Description ==
Edge-On includes four unrelated scenarios for Cyberspace. They provide only a framework, requiring gamemasters to provide added detail for optimal play.

1. "Network 69 takes the fall": The player-characters are hired by media firm Channel 32 to steal data on future programs from rival Channel 69.
2. "Ward, I'm Worried": The player-characters are hired by a mega-corporation to find a missing scientist, bringing them in contact with the Fusers gang in the slums of San Francisco, and the Fusers' cybernetic leader.
3. "Safety Violation": The player-characters are hired by Okira Corporation to sabotage an oil rig owned by rival New Edison. After they start the explosives' timers, an earthquake cuts off their line of escape.
4. "Unscheduled Layover": During a courier mission, the player-characters' shuttle crashes in the Amazon rainforest, and they discover an ancient Mayan city transformed into a secret base.

Reviewer Stephan Wieck spoke positively about scenarios No. 1 and 3, stating that "Safety Violation" had the best plot. He felt scenarios No. 2 and 4 may have been insufficiently developed.

The book also includes guidelines showing how to link the scenarios to one another.

== Publication history ==
ICE first published Cyberspace in 1989. The game's first supplement, Edge-On, subtitled Cyberventure Mission File #1, was published the following year, a 48-page softcover book written by Terry Amthor, with interior art by Kevin Barrett, Angela Bostick, Dell Harris, Rick Lowry, and Chuck Muchowa, and cover art by Janet Aulisio-Dannheiser.

== Reception ==
Stephan Wieck reviewed the product in the June–July 1990 issue of White Wolf. He rated it at 3 of 5 points, stating that there was "some good stuff" but "requires additional work".

== Reviews ==
- Games Review June 1990 (Vol. 2, Issue 9, p. 60)
