= Emer (Shadow World) =

Shadow World
- Designers: Terry K. Amthor
- Publishers: Eidolon Studio, Iron Crown Enterprises, Guild Companion Publications
- Publication: 1987–current
- Genres: Fantasy
- Languages: English
- Systems: Rolemaster
- Media type: Game accessories, novels, role-playing games

In the Shadow World campaign setting, Emer is a continent on Kulthea, where the Grand Campaign takes place. It is the largest contenint on the planet, roughly located within the center of the western hemisphere.

Culturally, Emer is diverse, and is home for elves, dwarves, and a host of human sub-groups. Lugrôki dwell in the Spine of Emer, while garks are prevalent throughout the tropical forests of the eastern Silaarian peninsula. In its past, vast empires have risen to dominate nearly all of Emer, but today it is largely fragmented politically.

== Development history ==
Emer was first described in the Shadow World Master Atlas, First Edition, published in 1989. In 1990, ICE released Emer: The Great Continent, which described the area in more detail.

At one point during Iron Crown's' financial difficulties in the late 1990s, the rights to Shadow World reverted to its author, Terry Amthor. Amthor produced several works under the name "Eidolon Studios" that explored Emer in more detail.

== Geography ==
Emer can be broken down geographically as follows: Hæstra in the North-west, Tai-emer in the central North, Silaar in the North-east, Uj in the South-west, Khûm-kaan in the central-east, Onar in the far south-east, and Ræl in the far south, and Námar-Tol, a chain of seven large islands, is east of Emer.

=== Hæstra ===
Hæstra is the northwest portion of Emer. It is largely fertile, with a mild temperate climate. Abundant natural resources make the region is one of the most densely settled and widely cultivated portions of Emer. The Spine of Emer, a long mountain chain that runs through the entire north-south axis of the continent, borders Hæstra to the east. The Morbek highlands separate Hæstra form the desert plains of Uj to the south. The Bay of Izar forms a portion of the region's southwest border.

=== Khûm-kaan ===
Khûm-kaan forms the main southeast block of Emer. It consists of broad plains, dense tropical forest, tall mountainous peaks, and temperate coasts. Its borders are defined by three mountain ranges: The Spine of Emer, the Black Mountains, and the Green Mountains, respectively. A break between the Spine and Emer and the Black Mountains allows access to the Rælian Bay in the southwest, while the Green Mountains, the eastern shore of Lygaar, and the northern shore of Quon form the Bay of Zalkali in the region’s northeast area. The Quon jungle covers nearly three quarters of Khûm-kaan’s total area.

=== Námar-Tol ===
Námar-Tol (Loari, "Verdant Towers") is an island east of Emer. It features a mountain in its center, the rest of the island being lush forest and plains.

=== Onar ===
Onar is a peninsula stretches east of Khûm-kaan, connected to the mainland by a narrow band of mountainous land. The southern side of the peninsula (running parallel to the peninsula’s east-west axis) consists of stepped and fractured mountains that inherently cut the northern lowlands off from the Swirling Sea to the south, The western portion of the region, closest to Khûm-kaan, is covered by Rulaash Forest, an unexplored and relatively impenetrable jungle. In central Onar is Ahnasan, an area of broad and rolling plains.

=== Ræl ===
Ræl is a peninsula in the far south of Emer, desolate and generally uninhabited. It is connected to the Emerian mainland by the southern extent of the Spine of Emer.

=== Silaar ===
Silaar is a peninsula on the northeast corner of Emer. It is connected by the Arul waste, a narrow band of desert of Arul, and otherwise separated from the rest of mainland by the Sea of Tears and the Bay of Arûl. There are two mountain ranges along either coast of the peninsula: the Rust Mountains to the west and the Mountains of Ash to the east. The Lake of Glass is at the center of Silaar, sandwiched between the two mountain chains. To the east of the lake is the Værkin Mire, which contains ruins of many cities built by the Thanorian empire before its fall.

=== Tai-emer ===
Tai-emer occupies the northeast portion of Emer, bounded by the Spine of Emer on the west (which separates it from Hæstra) while the Sea of Tears and the Bay of Arûl separate Tai-emer from the Silaarian peninsula, located to the east. It consists of flat steppes that tend to be windy, hot, and semi-arid, relieved by several river valleys in the north; and the Arul desert in the south.

=== Uj ===
By area, Uj is the largest Emerian region, located south of Hæstra and separated from that region by the Morbek Highlands. Eastern Uj consists of sparsely populated desert and arid plains. The western portion of the region, separated by the Barrier Hills is relatively fertile.

== Political entities ==
=== Ahnasan ===
Ahnasan is home to the Kinsai (“cat-people”), so called because of large, six-legged panthers they domesticate and use as mounts.

=== Bodlea ===
A collection of rustic villages, each ruled by a local council.

=== First Emerian Empire ===
A continent-spanning empire ruled by six Titans known as the Masters of Emer. It rose and fell in the Second Age, and only ruins remain in the canonical "contemporary" timeline.

=== Itanis ===
Itanis is an island off the southern coast of Uj. Tropical in climate, it is populated by black-skinned "High Men" ruled by two gender-associated groups: Men who wield mind-magics and a female warrior class.

=== Kaitaine ===
A free city in Uj that derives its power primarily from mercantile activity.

=== Komarran Cluster ===
A republic situated on an island of the same name. The Republic was founded by a displaced prince of the Second Emerian Empire who found it necessary to flee his home's homophobic policies. A prominent characteristic of the island is acceptance of diverse sexual orientations and criminalization of homophobic utterances and actions.

=== Lankanôk ===
A theocracy that occupies the majority of Tai-Emer.

=== Malqanar ===
Malqanar is a kingdom of aquatic Elves called Shuliri located at the far eastern extremity of Onar.

=== Námar-Tol ===
Námar-Tol is an eponymous island oligarchic republic. There are seven Elven (Loari) families that constitute the ruling class, with all other inhabitants living there on sufferance as heavily regulated "plebeians." There is also a trade city, Orv Cibur (Erlin, Gold Haven), that allows non-resident visitors.

=== Nuyan-Khôm ===
Nuyan Khom is a feudal monarchy composed of ten Y'nar Clans or "yani."

=== Reandor ===
Reandor is a hereditary monicary located in western Silaar.

=== Rhiani Horse Clans ===
The Rhiani are a set of nomadic-based clans known for their skill breeding horses.

=== Sarnak ===
A matriarchal representative democracy. Male citizens are disenfranchised and held in a second class.

=== Sel-kai ===
Sel-Kai (Erlini (Wood Elven), Silver Cliff) is a city-state and surrounding rural territories on several islands and a peninsula in northern Silaar. It is the continent's, and perhaps the world's, largest trade center. This preeminence is maintained by the near-monopolist possession of flying ships. The city's government and upper social circles display this wealth in large part through the erection and maintenance of Eidolon, a floating city above the eponymous capital.

=== Stroane ===
An empire that covers most of the Hæstran sub-continent. It includes what had once been a confederacy of city-states known as Miir and another known as Vornia. In the game's canonical "contemporary" setting, these are recent conquests and the further one is from the capital city of Arakin the looser the Empire's control. In some parts of the empire the priestly hierarchy of the goddess Mynistra remains in open revolt.

=== Tana ===
A polity composed of Erlin Elves, indigenous to Námar-Tol who were displaced when the larger island was colonized by the Loari elves.

=== Ton Bor ===
A subterranean kingdom of Dwarves generally isolated from the bulk of the continent.
