= Quellbourne: Land of the Silver Mist =

1981 role-playing game supplement

Tales of the Loremasters
- Cover art by Tony Roberts
- Designers: Daniel Henley; Margaret Henley
- Illustrators: Tony Roberts; Jennell Jaquays; Dan Carroll; Eric Hotz
- Publishers: Iron Crown Enterprises
- Publication: 1989
- Genres: Fantasy

Quellbourne: Land of the Silver Mist is a supplement published by Iron Crown Enterprises (I.C.E.) in 1989 for the fantasy role-playing game Rolemaster, specifically for a setting called Shadow World.

== Contents ==
Quelbourne: Land of the Silver Mist was the first supplement published for Shadow World setting, and describes a large wild region, the small town Kelfal's Landing the only mark of civilization. To the east lie the ruins of an ancient city.

== Publication history ==
In 1980, (I.C.E.) published the Rolemaster fantasy role-playing game rules, and shortly afterwards published an adventure, The Iron Wind, which was set in a place called Shadow World. In 1989, I.C.E. published the Shadow World Master Atlas, which gave details of the western hemisphere of the world of Kulthea.

I.C.E. also published several supplements and adventures for Shadow World, the first supplement being Quelbourne: Land of the Silver Mist, a 72-page book written by Daniel Henley and Margaret Henley, with cover art by Tony Roberts, and interior illustrations by Dan Carroll and Jennell Jaquays (Note: Credited as Paul Jaquays.), and cartography by Eric Hotz. It was published by Iron Crown Enterprises in 1989.

== Reception ==
In the August 1989 edition of the British game magazine Games International, Oliver Johnson reviewed four supplements for Shadow World: Journey to the Magic Isle, Demons of the Burning Night, Quellbourne: Land of the Silver Mist, and Tales of the Loremasters. Collectively, he concluded "too much of it is of the 'seen it and done it all before' variety" and that "Creatures and settings here are the worst side of amorphic[] all mush [sic] together into an unpalatable stew". To Quellbourne specifically he awarded 2 1/2 stars out of 5, and stated that "There is too much of the usual fantastic 'and here's the Moot Hall and here's the Herbalists' variety in the major town, Kelfal's Landing, not enough of a strong sustained plot to get the referee and players through a session."
