= List of Shadow World races =

Types of fictional living being in a role-playing game

Shadow World
- Designers: Terry K. Amthor
- Publishers: Eidolon Studio, Iron Crown Enterprises, Guild Companion Publications
- Publication: 1987–current
- Genres: Fantasy/Science Fiction
- Languages: English
- Media type: Game accessories, novels, role-playing games,

There are various types or "races" of fictional living being who feature in the role-playing game Shadow World. Inhabiting the fictional planet of Kulthea, they include types resembling humans ("mortals"); the immortal "elven"; hybrid types; and monsters.

== Mortals ==
=== High Men ===
- Laan (known as Zori in Jaiman or Talath on Emer or Myri in Tanara) have average lifespan of approximately 150 years, but are taller and more heavily boned than Elves. They are offshoots of the Worum.

=== Other mortal races ===
- Dúranaki (Eastern Lords) are an offshoot of the Zor. Driven underground to hide from fierce enemies, they have grown into a nocturnal and distinctive culture and a reduced life span that they are no longer considered as High men.
- Kinsai are offshoots or creations of the Jintani.
- Aldari as offshoots of the Taranians are a humanoid human looking race alien to Kulthea

=== Common Men ===
Common men on Kulthea tend to be smaller and shorter-lived than their High Men brethren. They are composed of myriad of different racial and cultural groups. The following list addresses some of the primary groups found on Emer and Jaiman.

- Anzeti reside in the mountainous regions of central Emer. Hardened by their climate, they are shy and reclusive, isolated, and seldom encountered by other races
- Jaaderi make their homes on the plains of Tai-emer.
- Rhiani are nomadic residents of the desert plains of Uj in southern Emer famous for their horses. A nictitating membrane shows they are either heavily genetically modified or of an entirely different species from other common men.
- Shay are the most numerous human stock, the result of the mixture of many racial sub-groups, that reside in Tai-emer and southern and central Hæstra. As such, their physical characteristics can be quite varied. Groups of Shay who migrated to Jaiman are called Jameri, though they are effectively identical.
- Talath (called Myri in Jaiman) are more powerfully built and taller than most common men, tending to live in agrarian cultures.
- Y’nari have a distinctive appearance in Jaiman and Emer because of their almond-shaped eyes that slant slightly up on the outside, and eyelids with epicanthic folds. While they live in relatively isolated cultures in Emer, they form the majority populations of several other continents.

=== Other ===
- Dwarves (Nomari)

== Immortals ==
=== Elves ===
Shadow World Elves are taller and stronger than those found in the various Dungeons & Dragons settings, and are immortal.

Within Shadow World, elves are divided into a number of sub-types, including Linæri, Loari, Dyari and Erlini. The first three types are considered the “High Born,” referred to as the Iylari. As a whole, they are generally taller than humans, have elongated ears, larger eyes, and slightly delicate features. To mortals, they can be quite beautiful. Common to all of the elves, however, are their egos, as they view themselves superior to all other races. This self-aggrandizement is demonstrated differently by each particular elven sub-group (i.e., the Erlini are somewhat self-effacing while the Linæri maintain a certain degree of charm about it), but it is most prominent among the Loari elves, who make no attempt at hiding their contempt for mortals.

- Linæri ("Singers")are more philosophical and musical of the two groups of Iylari, preferring open spaces to structures and airy homes. They typically have golden blond hair, blue eyes, and fair skin.
- Loari ("Builders") seek power and the ability to craft; they are the forgers of great kingdoms and items of power. They are technologically advanced in the context of Shadow World.
- Dyari ("Delvers") are called "Dark Elves", but are not dark skinned. They are typically fair skinned with pale or white hair, dark eyes, and can be physically intimidating like the Loari.
- Erlini ("Growers") are commonly called Wood Elves. They tend to be shorter than their high-born brethren and less muscular, but are among the most agile. Like the Linæri, the Erlini tend to live close to nature and prefer her in her unaltered state. Their architecture is never intrusive on nature, but seeks to work with it and around it. The Erlini are the most likely of the elven groups to intermingle with humans.

== "Monsters" ==
- Garks are carnivorous ape-like creatures that inhabit the dense jungles and temperate forests of Emer and Jaiman. They are short, muscular, covered in a mottled gray fur, and only semi-intelligent. They employ crude weapons of stone, bone, or wood when aggressively defending their territory or raiding caravans, travelers, or homesteads.
- Murlogi are small and vicious humanoids that carve cavernous homes out of the various mountain chains throughout Kulthea. They are fast-breeding, and their population numbers are uncountable. They are typically 3 – 4 ½ feet tall with large distorted faces, long ears, sharp teeth, and long arms. They are mistaken for stupid by surface dwellers, but they are actually skilled tacticians and crafters.
- Lugrôki are strong and fierce warriors. Their skin is almost black, and large fangs emerge from their snout-like mouth. They are talented craftsman, but their technology is focused entirely on military applications. Lesser Lugrôki are somewhat analogous to Orcs in Tolkien's legendarium, while greater Lugrôki resemble the Uruk-hai.
- Trolls are big, stupid, and extremely aggressive. Comprising many different kinds, trolls are found in nearly any kind of ecological context. Almost all trolls are sensitive to sunlight, and many local legends hold that they turn to stone or wood if exposed to direct sunlight.
