= Bruce Neidlinger =

- Occupation: Game designer

Bruce R. Neidlinger is a game designer who has worked primarily on role-playing games.

== Career ==
Bruce Neidlinger was one of the original principles of Iron Crown Enterprises, along with Pete Fenlon, S. Coleman Charlton, Richard H. Britton, Terry K. Amthor, Bruce Shelley, Kurt Fischer, Heike Kubasch, and Olivia Fenlon. By the end of 1982, ICE was profitable enough that Neidlinger was able to take a full-time position with a salary.

Neidlinger later became CEO for Mjolnir LLC.
