= Lórien & The Halls of the Elven Smiths =

Tabletop role-playing game supplement

Cover art by Angus McBride, 1986

Lórien & The Halls of the Elven Smiths is a supplement published by Iron Crown Enterprises (ICE) in 1986 for the fantasy role-playing game Middle-earth Role Playing, which is itself based on the works of J.R.R. Tolkien.

== Contents ==
=== Background ===
In Tolkien's published history of Middle-earth, Galadriel and Celeborn founded the elven kingdom of Eregion (elven for "Land of Holly", called by humans "Hollin") west of the Misty Mountains early in the Second Age, ruling from the city of Ost-in-Edhil. When Galadriel and Celeborn moved across the Misty Mountains to assume rulership of Lórien six hundred years later, Celebrimbor took over rulership of Eregion. After Sauron, in the guise of Annatar ("Lord of Gifts"), taught Celebrimbor's smiths to forge the Seven Rings of the dwarves and the Nine Rings of men, and Celebrimbor himself forged the Three Rings of the elves, Sauron forged the One Ring to rule them all. The elves refused his overlordship, hiding the Three, and in revenge, Sauron's armies ravaged Eregion.

In The Lord of the Rings set in the Third Age, several thousand years after Eregion's destruction, The Fellowship of the Ring passed through the empty lands of Hollin on their way to the Mines of Moria. Emerging from the Mines after the fall of Gandalf, the Fellowship sought refuge in Lórien, and Galadriel allowed them to stay.

=== Setting ===
Lórien & The Halls of the Elven Smiths is a supplement that describes both elven kingdoms, Eregion in the Second Age, and Lórien in both the Second Age and the Third Age. Contents include:

- A general description of the lands surrounding both kingdoms.
- Descriptions of the various races of elves.
- Eregion's capital, Ost-in-Edhil, in both the Second Age (including its fortress) and the Third Age (as ruins).
- Lórien in both the Second and Third Ages.

The book includes outlines for several adventures:

- Four adventures set in Ost-in-Edhil in the Second Age at the height of Eregion's power around S.A 1350–1375, about 300 years before its fall
- Two adventures in the ruins of Ost-in-Edhil, about 3500 years after Eregion's destruction and 1500 years before the events of The Lord of the Rings
- Three adventures set in and around Lórien in the Third Age, two of them set 1500 years before the events of The Lord of the Rings, and the other related directly to events in the book.

There are seven maps of the various regions covered, as well as a map of Middle-earth.

== Publication history ==
ICE published the licensed game Middle-earth Role Playing in 1982, and then released many supplements for it over the next 17 years, until the Tolkien Estate withdrew their license in 1999. Lórien & The Halls of the Elven Smiths was the eighth supplement, a 64-page book with two center-bound color maps published in 1986, written by Terry Amthor, with a cover by Angus McBride, cartography by Pete Fenlon, Jessica Ney, and Terry Amthor, and illustrations by Liz Danforth.

== Reception ==
In the September 1986 edition of White Dwarf (Issue #81), Graham Staplehurst was impressed by the depth of knowledge in this supplement. He noted that the "useful summary of special metals and magical substances" would be "of much use to gamemasters wishing to devise their own special and magical items." He also found "The building designs are quite breathtaking" and "the expression of character and culture throughout the supplement [...] means that the whole world seems so much more real and alive to the senses." He concluded, "Lorien is one of the finest roleplaying supplements I've seen, and is surely a must for all MERP players. Highly recommended to all lovers of fine roleplaying."

In the January 1987 edition of Adventurer (Issue 6), Jon Sutherland was impressed by the depth of information provided, commenting "The attention to detail is very much up to the standard we have come to expect from this series." He wanted more detail in the adventure hooks, noting that they were "rather brief [...] The nine adventures cover only two pages of the sixty-two, so they are not exactly 'fleshed out'." But he was impressed by the included maps, although he wished they had been single-sided rather than printed on both sides. In the end, Sutherland was ambivalent about the usefulness of this supplement despite all of its good points, saying, "It is in many ways the least useful MERP supplement released so far. The nature of Lorien does not really lend itself to a starting position for an adventure."

In Issue 5 of Gateways, Dan Quartermain commented that this book "captures the flavor of the Wood of the Golden Lady Galadriel. The world of Tolkien's Elves in Lothlorien takes life in the text, and no magic is lost in its translation into a gaming aid."
