= Journey to the Magic Isle =

1989 role-playing game supplement

- Cover art by Tony Roberts
- Designers: Timothy Taylor
- Illustrators: Tony Roberts; Harry Quinn
- Publishers: Iron Crown Enterprises
- Publication: 1989
- Genres: Fantasy

Journey to the Magic Isle is a supplement published by Iron Crown Enterprises (I.C.E.) for the fantasy role-playing game Rolemaster, specifically for a setting called Shadow World.

== Contents ==
Journey to the Magic Isle is a supplement describing the lost island of Uman, where a place called the Magic Isle lies at the heart of a volcanic lake, used by master sorcerers. It is also the home of the University of Magical Arts.

The book describes Uman and the Magic Isle. There is also a complete description of the university, department by department: Natural Magic, Divine Magic, Mental Magic, Essential Magic, and Arcane Magic. For each department, notable personalities are also described.

The book also includes several short scenarios:

- "Journey to the Magic Isle": New sorcerers meet for the time as they travel to the university.
- "While masters are away...": The sorcerers have to protect Magic Island from a lich.

The book ends with three scenario ideas that can be used to further explore the university and its surroundings.

== Publication history ==
In 1980, (I.C.E.) published the Rolemaster fantasy role-playing game rules, and shortly afterwards published and adventure, The Iron Wind, which was set in Shadow World. In 1989, I.C.E. published the Shadow World World Atlas, which gave details of the western hemisphere of the world of Kulthea.

I.C.E. also published several supplements and adventures for Shadow World, including Journey to the Magic Isle, a 64-page softcover book designed by Timothy Taylor, with cover art by Tony Roberts, and interior illustrations by Harry Quinn. It was published by I.C.E. in 1989.

== Reception ==
Oliver Johnson reviewed four supplements for RoleMaster set in Shadow World at the same time, in the August 1989 issue (#8) of Games International magazine: Journey to the Magic Isle, Demons of the Burning Night, Quellbourne: Land of the Silver Mist, and Tales of the Loremasters. Collectively, he concluded "too much of it is of the ‘seen it and done it all before’ variety" and that "Creatures and settings here are the worst side of amorphic[] all mush [sic] together into an unpalatable stew". To Journey to the Magic Isle specifically he awarded 2 1/2 stars out of 5, stating "Like the American college campus this University resembles, here are plenty of opportunities for the unwitting to get zapped, particularly by a lich lord, the mad professor of the set."
