= The Body Bank =

The Body Bank is a 1990 role-playing game supplement published by Iron Crown Enterprises for Cyberspace.

== Contents ==
The Body Bank is a supplement in which "Character Compendium #2" provides detailed descriptions of 27 non-player characters (NPCs) for the gamemaster (GM) to use. These characters include a smuggler, a cyber doc, a "hunter of the cursed," a net hacker, a rock band with seven members, and a mercenary group with four members. Each character is illustrated, with half of the illustrations in color.

== Publication history ==
The Body Bank was written by Chad Brinkley with art by Janet Aulisio and published by Iron Crown Enterprises in 1990 as a 40-page book.
