= Haunted Ruins of the Dunlendings =

1987 fnatasy role-playing game supplement

- Cover art by Gail McIntosh
- Designers: Ruth Sochard Pitt
- Illustrators: Gail McIntosh; Jessica Ney; Stephan Peregrine
- Publishers: Iron Crown Enterprises
- Publication: 1985
- Genres: Tolkien fantasy

Haunted Ruins of the Dunlendings is a set of adventures published by Iron Crown Enterprises (ICE) in 1985 for the fantasy role-playing game Middle-earth Role Playing, which is itself based on the works of J.R.R. Tolkien.

== Setting ==
Haunted Ruins of the Dunlendings is a collection of three MERP adventures set in the region of Dunland:

1. "The Tale of the Lonely Tower": The adventurers are hired to investigate the deaths of some merchants near the Lonely Tower on the road between the towns of Cabed Angren and Sarn Erech.
2. "The Tale of the Seven Stones": The adventurers explore the ancient temple of Setmaenen, filled with treasure but guarded by deadly traps and spirits.
3. "The Tale of Hogo Tarosvan": The party follows a kidnapped boy to a haunted butte.

== Publication history ==
ICE first acquired the license to publish role-playing games based on the works of J.R.R. Tolkien in 1982, and released A Campaign and Adventure Guidebook for Middle-earth, a system-agnostic fantasy role-playing game campaign. This was quickly followed by six sourcebooks with details of various regions of Middle-earth. Although adventures were included, some reviewers thought the scenarios were not as good as the background material. In 1984, ICE developed their own role-playing system, Middle Earth Role-Playing, and subsequent material had a new focus on adventures over background information. ICE released many supplements and adventures for MERP over the next 17 years, until the Tolkien Estate withdrew their license in 1999. Haunted Ruins of the Dunlendings was published by ICE in 1985, a 31-page softcover book written by Rutch Sochard, with cartography by Jessica Ney and Judy Hnat, interior art by Ney and Stephan Peregrine, and cover art by Gail McIntosh.

== Reception ==
Critical reception was generally favorable. Dave Nalle thought the book was "nicely produced, up to ICE's usual standards, with slick paper, nice graphics and pleasing art." Of the three scenarios, Nalle called them "all outstanding scenarios, not because they are exceptionally original, but because they are intelligent and logical, capable of being run in a single session and providing excellent storylines, detailed non-player characters, and a variety of intellectual and physical challenges for the characters." Nalle concluded, "It is a high quality adventure collection typical of the excellence which ICE strives for."

Lev Lafayette noted, "Following the release of MERP, ICE produced a number of Middle Earth adventure scenarios where the background material was de-emphasised in favour of greater detail in adventure leads making the products 'ready to play', of which the "Haunted Ruins of the Dunlendings" is the best example of the new orientation." Graham Staplehurst noted the focus on ancient monuments, and called this a "good example" for generating "many ideas for potential adventures incorporating them." Anne Vétillard called the book "Three great adventures, very well detailed: An ancient watchtower, an ancient village, and a strange cromlech."

== Other recognition ==
A copy of Haunted Ruins of the Dunlendings is held in the J.R.R. Tolkien Collection of Raynor Library at Marquette University. (Series 5.5, Box 13).
