= Dicemaster: Doom Cubes =

Dicemaster: Doom Cubes is a 1999 collectible dice game supplement published by Iron Crown Enterprises for Dicemaster: Cities of Doom.

== Contents ==
Dicemaster: Doom Cubes is a supplement in which eight new dice are included per pack—action, combat, healing, and rune variants—that offer tweaks to existing mechanics. These changes allow players to customize tactics, becoming stealthier or more resilient.

== Reception ==
Steve Faragher reviewed Dicemaster: Doom Cubes for Arcane magazine, rating it a 5 out of 10 overall, and stated that "All represent fairly simple variations on the basic game, often just featuring a new face on a dice that already exists in the basic set. They are designed to be swapped with the dice you've already bought so that you can tailor your playing tactics, making you sneakier with monsters or tougher in combat. For the most part, they appear to be changes made for the sake of making changes rather than constituting any substantial improvement in gameplay, and as such I find them hard to recommend They look quite nice, though."

== Reviews ==
- Backstab #3
