= Eidolon: City in the Sky =

Tabletop role-playing game supplement

Cover art by Marco Aidala, 1992

Eidolon: City in the Sky is a supplement published by Iron Crown Enterprises in 1992 for the fantasy role-playing game Rolemaster.

== Contents ==
Eidolon: City in the Sky is a 160- page softcover book designed by Terry Kevin Amthor, with illustrations by Storn Cook and cover art by Marco Aidala. It includes two 16" x 21" double-sided maps.

Part of Iron Crown's Shadow World series, the book describes the airborne capital city of Eidolon as well as Sel-kai City, which exists on the ground below. Details include descriptions of 300 businesses and a few notable inhabitants, price charts, and an elven pronunciation guide. Eight adventure outlines are also included.

== Reviews ==
In the October 1993 edition of Dragon (Issue #198), Rick Swan liked the "clean layout and sharp graphics", although he found some of the illustrations a bit dull. Swan was disappointed that only handful of citizens were outlined, and even those details were too sparse. He thought the eight adventures were "adequately plotted and staged, but they're far too pedestrian for a setting this grand." Despite these problems, he concluded, "Vividly imagined and beautifully rendered, Eidolon: City in the Sky remains the crown jewel of the Shadow World series."
