= The Lonely Mountain (board game) =

Board game

- Designers: Coleman Charlton
- Illustrators: Terry Amthor; Gail McIntosh; Charles Peale
- Publishers: Iron Crown Enterprises
- Publication: 1984
- Genres: Tolkien fantasy

The Lonely Mountain, subtitled "Lair of Smaug the Dragon", is a board game published by Iron Crown Enterprises in 1984 that is based on J.R.R. Tolkien's book The Hobbit.

== Background ==
In The Hobbit, Bilbo Baggins sneaks into the Lonely Mountain to try to steal some of Smaug's treasure.

== Gameplay ==
The Lonely Mountain is a game in which each player sends a group consisting of dwarves, elves, men, orcs, or freebooters into the catacombs under the Lonely Mountain to steal as much of Smaug's treasure as possible.

== Publication history ==
Tolkien Enterprises granted an exclusive, worldwide license to ICE in 1982 to create and market board games and role-playing games based on LotR. ICE quickly developed Middle-earth Role Playing (MERP) as well as a long line of source books dealing with various geographical areas of Middle-earth. They also released a board game in 1984, The Lonely Mountain, that was designed by Coleman Charlton and illustrated by Terry Amthor, Gail McIntosh, and Charles Peale.

== Reception ==
In Issue 32 of Abyss, Dave Nalle noted "The main problem with the game is that it isn't very interesting ... It is well produced and designed, but like other games of the same genre (Dungeon, Talisman, etc.) it is not a lasting font of excitement."

In The Space Gamer No. 75, Rick Swan commented "I'll give Lonely Mountain a thumbs up if I.C.E. will promise two things: (1) no more hack-and-slash dungeon boardgames, and (2) if you're going to promote your stuff as Tolkien products, give us a little more Tolkien next time. That said, nice job."

In the British RPG magazine Imagine, Andy Blakeman stated "Iron Crown Enterprises have come up with a good idea, combining a race against time with a wargame, but it is unlikely that I would choose to spend [this much] on this game."

== Awards ==
The Lonely Mountain was awarded the Charles S. Roberts Award for "Best Fantasy Boardgame of 1984".
