= CyberRogues =

Cover art by Janet Aulisio, 1990

CyberRogues is a supplement published by Iron Crown Enterprises (I.C.E.) in 1990 for the cyberpunk near-future science fiction role-playing game Cyberspace.

== Contents ==
CyberRogues is a supplement which details 30 non-player characters that the gamemaster can add to a Cyberspace campaign. The description of each character includes a complete personal background, attitude, appearance, skills, languages, and game statistics. The product is 40 pages.

== Publication history ==
I.C.E. published the cyberpunk role-playing game Cyberspace in 1989. CyberRogues was published the following year, a 40-page softcover book written by Steve Bouton, with art by Janet Aulisio.

== Reception ==
Stephan Wieck reviewed the product in the October–November 1990 issue of White Wolf. He noted it provided limited utility, stating that "CyberRogues has some good NPCs, but generally it isn't too useful. Gamemasters who don't have time to flesh out their own NPCs for their campaigns may find the supplement to be a good purchase." Wieck rated it at 2 of 5 points.
