= Demons of the Burning Night =

1989 role-playing game supplement

- Cover art by Tony Roberts
- Designers: Matthew Power
- Illustrators: Jennell Jaquays; David Harold Martin
- Publishers: Iron Crown Enterprises
- Publication: 1989
- Genres: Fantasy

Demons of the Burning Night is a supplement published by Iron Crown Enterprises (I.C.E.) for the fantasy role-playing game Rolemaster, specifically for a setting called Shadow World.

== Contents ==
Demons of the Burning Night describes the island of Aranmor, which at one time thousands of years ago, was the home of the evil empress Kadæna.

The book starts with adventure suggestions, and makes it clear that this is designed for high-level player characters. There are then chapters discussing climate and geography, fauna, population, history, intelligent beings, ancient gods, a new type of demon, artifacts, and many important characters.

The ancient city of Tarek Nev and its environs are also detailed.

The book includes pull-out color maps of Aranmor and the surrounding area, and black & white maps of Tarek Nev and a few specific buildings.

== Publication history ==
In 1980, (I.C.E.) published the Rolemaster fantasy role-playing game rules, and shortly afterwards published and adventure, The Iron Wind, which was set in Shadow World. In 1989, I.C.E. published the Shadow World World Atlas, which gave details of the western hemisphere of the world of Kulthea.

I.C.E. also published several supplements and adventures for Shadow World, including Demons of the Burning Night a 64-page book written by Matthew Power, with a cover by Tony Roberts, interior art by Jennell Jaquays (Note: Credited as Paul Jaquays.), and cartography by David Martin. It was published by Iron Crown Enterprises in 1989.

== Reception ==
Oliver Johnson reviewed four supplements for RoleMaster set in Shadow World at the same time, in the August 1989 issue (#8) of Games International magazine: Journey to the Magic Isle, Demons of the Burning Night, Quellbourne: Land of the Silver Mist, and Tales of the Loremasters. Collectively, he concluded "too much of it is of the ‘seen it and done it all before’ variety" and that "Creatures and settings here are the worst side of amorphic[] all mush [sic] together into an unpalatable stew". To Demons specifically he awarded 2 1/2 stars out of 5, stating that "All in all rather disappointing. Too much of the adventuring involves ability rolls rather than genuine role-playing and clues that the gamers can figure out for themselves. Friendly non player characters are clichéd and creatures are a dull rag bag."
