= Moria: The Dwarven City =

Tabletop role-playing game supplement

- Author: Peter Fenlon
- Illustrator: Terry Amthor; Rick Britton; Peter Fenlon; Jessica Ney-Grimm
- Publisher: Iron Crown Enterprises
- Publication date: 1984

Moria: The Dwarven City is a supplement published by Iron Crown Enterprises (ICE) in 1984 for the fantasy role-playing game Middle-earth Role Playing (MERP), itself based on The Lord of the Rings (LotR) by J.R.R. Tolkien.

== Background ==
In LotR, Frodo and his companions attempt to pass under the Misty Mountains via the abandoned dwarven city of Moria, but find that it is now inhabited by a balrog.

== Contents ==
Moria is a supplement that details the dwarven city of Moria and its inhabitants. Information includes city plans, dwarven culture, history and organization, and the armies commanded by the Balrog. Geography, climate, ecology, including interesting plants and animals are described in detail. The outer gates, bridges, various roads, dwellings, crypts, multiple rooms and traps are also detailed. The main underground passages and notable rooms over 13 main levels are covered in 15 pages and numerous maps.

The book includes an adventure set before the fall of the dwarven city:

- "The Embassy to the Dwarven King": The adventurers have been summoned by Falin, who wishes to overthrow King Bain. The adventurers must navigate the difficult diplomatic waters as court intrigue swirls around them.

Two adventures are set in the Third Age after the fall of Moria:

- "A Mission to Steal" The adventurers want to plunder the riches of the ruined city.
- "The Exploration Expedition": Balin has just been slain at the East-Gate. Now an expedition is mounted to find treasure in the ruined city.
- "The Search for Balin": Find the Chamber of Records and retrieve the record of Balin's fate.

Two adventures are set after the fall of Sauron:

- "Quest for Durin's Legacy": Adventures are to find and loot Durin's legacy of treasury and weapons.
- "The Closing of the Underdeeps": The adventures enter Moria to seal off the Balrog's chasm.

== Publication history ==
Tolkien Enterprises granted an exclusive, worldwide license to ICE in 1982 to create and market role-playing games based on LotR. ICE quickly developed Middle-earth Role Playing, and then developed a long line of source books dealing with various geographical areas of Middle-earth. One of these was Moria: The Dwarven City, a 72-page book designed by Peter Fenlon, with interior art by Terry Amthor, Rick Britton, Peter Fenlon, and Jessica Ney-Grimm, published by ICE in 1984. In 1988, Hexagonal published a French-language version.

== Reception ==
In Issue 32 of Abyss, Dave Nalle noted "Some of the material is very good, especially the political and historical detail. The added monsters and creatures are a bit dubious, but I suppose they are necessary for variety." Nalle concluded, "Moria is better suited than some of ICE's other aids for play with beginners ... but unfortunately some conversion work will be needed for advanced systems, as the ideas are somewhat ahead of the mechanics provided."

In the British RPG magazine Imagine, Andy Blakeman stated "Although there is a lot of interesting detail, I fear that disappointment is in store for those who buy this module [thinking that] Moria is the classic dungeon adventure. I'm sorry, but It isn't."

In The Space Gamer No. 75, Craig Sheeley commented "If you don't mind the price tag, Moria is a wonderful expansion on the information in The Fellowship of the Ring. I suggest it as a sourcebook for dwarves more than as a place of adventure; the inhabitants are too tough and the place is too big (super-sadistic GMs and doom-seeking players might like it, though...)"

In Issue 5 of Gateways, Dan Quartermain commented that this book "brings to life the dark histories of the Dwarves, touched with gold and the strength of stone. As is typical of all the supplements, a good GM can use the material within to bring his campaign to life — in this case, using the legacy of 'Durin's Folk' as a vehicle for many adventures."
