= Death Valley Free Prison =

1990 tabletop game supplement

Death Valley Free Prison is a 1990 role-playing game supplement published by Iron Crown Enterprises for Cyberspace.

== Contents ==
Death Valley Free Prison is a supplement in which a campaign setting is set in a future where a wall is built around Death Valley, turning it into a massive prison for the worst criminals. The setting details the geography of Death Valley and the criminal societies that have developed within the wall. It details various gangs and their headquarters, as well as wall security and border practices, and typical low-tech weapons and vehicles. The supplement comes with a border adventure scenario and a double-sided full-color regional map.

== Publication history ==
Death Valley Free Prison was written by Brian Booker with Ben Davis and a cover by Janet Aulisio and published by Iron Crown Enterprises in 1990 as 112-page book.

== Reception ==
Lawrence Schick called the prison setting "a neat idea".
