= Tales of the Loremasters =

1989 role-playing game adventure

- Cover art by Tony Roberts
- Designers: Thomas Kane
- Illustrators: Tony Roberts; Jennell Jaquays; David Harold Martin; David Martin; Ellisa Mitchell-Martin
- Publishers: Iron Crown Enterprises
- Publication: 1989
- Genres: Fantasy

Tales of the Loremasters is a collection of short adventures and adventure ideas published by Iron Crown Enterprises (I.C.E.) in 1989 for the fantasy role-playing game Rolemaster, specifically for a series titled Shadow World.

== Plot summary ==
Tales of the Loremasters is a collection of four short scenarios, set in a remote archipelago; each island has a different terrain and culture. The four adventures are:

- "The Shinh Archipelago"
- "The Fast of Gimgulsh"
- "Night Comes Soon"
- "Sarna, Land of Masquerade"

Ideas for further adventure are given for each of the four locations.

== Publication history ==
In 1980, (I.C.E.) published the Rolemaster fantasy role-playing game rules, and shortly afterwards published Shadow World, which describes the world of Kulthea, focusing specifically on the Western Hemisphere.

Over the years, I.C.E. published dozens of supplements and adventures for Shadow World, including Tales of the Loremasters, a 32-page softcover book designed by Thomas Kane, with cover art by Tony Roberts, interior illustrations by Jennell Jaquays (Note: Credited as Paul Jaquays.) and cartography by David Martin and Ellisa Mitchell-Martin. It was published by I.C.E. in 1989.

It was followed by a sequel the following year, Tales of the Loremasters II, comprising 10 more adventure scenarios.

== Reception ==
In Issue 8 of the British game magazine Games International, Oliver Johnson reviewed four Loremaster supplements for RoleMaster set in Shadow World: Journey to the Magic Isle, Demons of the Burning Night, Quellbourne: Land of the Silver Mist, and Tales of the Loremasters. Collectively, he concluded "too much of it is of the 'seen it and done it all before' variety" and that "Creatures and settings here are the worst side of amorphic all mush [sic] together into an unpalatable stew". To Tales specifically he awarded 3 1/2 stars out of 5, and stated that "generally non player characters are well thought out, particular in the Night Come Soon scenario."
