= Shadow World Master Atlas =

Tabletop role-playing game supplement

Cover art by Terry Roberts, 1989

Shadow World Master Atlas is a supplement published by Iron Crown Enterprises (I.C.E.) in 1989 for the fantasy role-playing game Rolemaster.

== Contents ==
Shadow World Master Atlas is a campaign setting detailing the world of Kulthea, the Shadow World. The boxed set contains

- 64-page book, "Master Atlas, Volume I", containing maps and details of various places
- 64-page book, "Master Atlas, Volume II", containing details of the main races of Kulthea
- 32-page book, "Atlas Addendum", containing information about monsters, and notes on how to convert these to other games systems
- 36" x 48" full-color map of the western hemisphere of Kulthea

== Publication history ==
In 1980, (I.C.E.) published the Rolemaster fantasy role-playing game rules, and shortly afterwards published an adventure, The Iron Wind, which was set on the world of Kulthea, nicknamed the Shadow World. In 1989, I.C.E. published the Shadow World Master Atlas, a boxed set containing two 64-page booklets, a fold-out color map, and a 32-page booklet detailing how to convert game statistics from Rolemaster to Fantasy Hero, Advanced Dungeons & Dragons, and Runequest.

Shadow World Master Atlas was written by Terry K. Amthor, with a cover by Tony Roberts, and illustrations by Jennell Jaquays (Note: Credited as Paul Jaquays.), and was published by Iron Crown Enterprises in 1989.

A number of different editions were produced, including a second edition by I.C.E. in 1992, a third edition by Eidolon Studios in 2001, and a 4th edition by I.C.E. in 2008.

== Reception ==
In the August 1989 edition of Games International (Issue #8), Steve Jones admired the production quality of the boxed set, including the "beautiful cover art" by Terry Roberts. However Jones pointed out several errors in layout as well as illegible tables and missing information, saying, "The whole product shows signs of having been rushed into production." He also mentioned that "Various pieces have been taken from previous I.C.E. publications, which may leave those who already have them feeling cheated." Jones concluded by giving the product an average rating of 3 out of 5, and questioned the necessity of this product, saying, "It is useful for monsters, but a Rolemaster referee with [the previously published] Creatures and Treasures could just as well go straight to the [separately published] adventures packs instead."

In Issue 52 of the French games magazine Casus Belli, Andre Foussat noted, "In my view, the primary objective of this (remarkably coherent) universe is to provide a justification for magic, integrating it into the very workings of the world and giving it a clear raison d'être." Foussat was not sure, though, whether this book was worth the money, but commented, "this highly Manichaean world does not offer much in the way of originality; however, for those who play other heroic fantasy games, it could serve as a valuable source of ideas for modules or unique locations." Foussat concluded, "If you play Rolemaster, then it's a resounding 'yes'; if you play anything else, only consider it if you're completely out of ideas."

Thomas M. Kane reviewed Shadow World Atlas in White Wolf #17 (1989), rating it a 4 out of 5 and stated that "Gamers experimenting with a new fantasy campaign should consider the Shadow World. Of course, those who already have worlds may find the Master Atlas superfluous. Like certain 'generic' products, it begs the question of why customers could not just invent this material themselves. However, the presentation and ideas are fascinating."

Writing for Pyramid, Maik Hennbach reviewed the third edition, and admitted he had found the 1st and 2nd editions "one of the weaker efforts of the [Shadow World] line." Hennback did not like that the foldout color map in the first two editions had been reduced to eight color printouts, calling it "something of a stop-gap measure." However, once they started reading the content, Hennbach admitted "I came across a lot of intriguing ideas." Hennbach liked much of the content, finding the history of the world the "most outstanding part." Hennbach concluded that the third edition was "a wonderful introduction into a fantasy background that differs significantly from both the normal pseudo medieval fare and from exotic worlds like Glorantha, Talislanta, or Tekumel. If you have enough of elves, wizards and dragons then it will not differ enough to make you come back, however."
