= Riddle of the Ring =

Board game

- 1985 edition (I.C.E.), cover art by Chris White
- Designers: John Cailiff III; William Walker
- Illustrators: Rick Britton; Jim Holloway; Jessica Ney; Charles Peale; Chris White
- Publishers: 1977: Fellowship Games; 1985: I.C.E.
- Publication: 1977
- Genres: Fantasy

Riddle of the Ring is a board game published by Fellowship Games in 1977 based on J.R.R. Tolkien's The Lord of the Rings; an authorized version was published by Iron Crown Enterprises (I.C.E.) in 1982.

== Description ==
Riddle of the Ring is a board game for 2–8 players who take the roles of important characters from The Lord of the Rings. Players draw and play cards for all the actions, and options during game play.

=== Components ===
- A board depicting a portion of Tolkien's Middle Earth
- Basic rules (8 pages)
- Advanced rules (4 pages)
- Eight plastic rings, tokens or stones (depending on which edition) representing the characters: Frodo (white), Sam (green), Merry (blue), Pippin (Yellow), and the four Black Riders (Black, Red, Brown, and Grey)
- 96 cards (25 Travel cards, 18 Army cards, 28 Character cards, 25 Special cards)
- a six-sided die

=== Setup ===
The players first decide on factions. In a two-player game, each takes either the four hobbits or the four Black Riders. Three or four players can each take multiple characters from the same faction. More than four players can choose or draw individual characters. Once roles are decided, players place their markers on the hex marked "The Shire". The deck is shuffled and each player is dealt two cards to begin the game.

=== Gameplay ===
The action is driven by card picks, and characters can only draw cards when in a city. Although in the case of a battle, hobbits are safe in Good cities and Black Riders are safe in Evil cities, either may visit any city to pick up cards. Cards provide allies, special movement and helpful items and abilities. Eventually one player will draw the One Ring card, and then must move it to the winning destination. Other players may have cards that allow them to discover who has the Ring, and possibly even steal the ring. For example, the Gollum card allows a player to steal the Ring from any other player.

=== Victory conditions ===
To win, the hobbits must successfully move the One Ring to Mount Doom and survive for one turn, while Dark Riders, minions of Sauron, must move the One Ring to Barad-dûr and survive for one turn.

== Publication history ==
Bag closure of Fellowship Games' 1983 edition

John Cailiff III and William Walker of Fellowship Games designed and published Riddle of the Ring in 1977. They did not have a license from the Tolkien Estate, and although the game clearly used characters, themes and place names from The Lord of the Rings, a notice on the gameboard stated that the game was not related to Professor Tolkien's work. Fellowship Games produced four versions of this game between 1977 and 1983, packaged in a plastic bag.

Iron Crown Enterprises, which did have a license to produce games based on the works of Tolkien, bought the rights to Riddle of the Ring in 1982 and published a boxed set with updated artwork and more professional production values. ICE released a second edition featuring new artwork in 1985.

In his 2014 book Designers & Dragons: The '80s, game historian Shannon Appelcline explained that "ICE's Middle-earth board games ran from The Riddle of the Ring (1982), a clever game of card management and bluffing, to The Battle of Five Armies (1984), a more traditional chit-based wargame. By the time of that final publication in 1984, ICE was already mostly out of the board game industry. It'd be a decade before they published another board game using their Middle-earth license."

In 1987, Hobby Japan published a Japanese version, 指輪の謎.

== Reception ==
Dave Nalle, writing in Abyss, noted "Characters bop around madly, zapping each other with all sorts of strange things, often playing for revenge and losing track of the spirit of the game. It doesn't really preserve the essence of the books, but it can be fun to play because of the variety of things you can do." The only major problem Nalle found with the game was the combat system "which is too clear cut, with the win always going to the person with the best cards." Nalle concluded, "Riddle of the Ring is well produced and fun to play, but it does not do justice to Tolkien's work for those that revere the classic. It is also fairly simple so it may not hold a great deal of long term interest."

In the April 1986 edition of White Dwarf (Issue #76), Charles Vasey commented, "Although the rules are fairly simple and the play mechanics not really new, the whole game has a surprisingly good element of atmosphere." Vasey noted that the resultant storyline produced by the game bore no resemblance to Tolkien's books, but "We found this was pretty unimportant because played properly the game is fast and furious with cards being slapped down and picked up at a great rate. It's fast pacy stuff." He concluded by giving the game an overall rating of 6 out of 10, saying, "We enjoyed Riddle of the Ring and played a couple of games on the trot. Furthermore it can be played by up to eight players and would accommodate differing levels of experience with ease."

Larry DiTillio reviewed Riddle of the Ring for Different Worlds magazine and stated that "In summation, Riddle of the Ring may appeal to you if you're fond of lots of card play and Tolkien and are willing to give it a couple of tries before passing judgment."

Franz Schulte-Kulkmann called it "easy playing, but the more players are available, the more fun it brings."
