= The Tower of Cirith Ungol and Shelob's Lair =

Fantasy role-playing game adventure

- Author: Carl Willner
- Illustrator: Chris White; Charles Peale
- Publisher: Iron Crown Enterprises
- Publication date: 1984
- ISBN: 0915795213

The Tower of Cirith Ungol and Shelob's Lair is a sourcebook published by Iron Crown Enterprises (ICE) in 1984 for the fantasy role-playing game Middle-earth Role Playing, itself based on The Lord of the Rings (LotR) by J.R.R. Tolkien.

== Background ==
In Tolkien's The Lord of the Rings, Frodo and Samwise Gamgee enter Mordor through a mountain pass that leads to the fortress of Cirith Ungol, guarded by orcs and goblins. Before they reach the fortress, Gollum leads them into an catacomb that supposedly bypasses the fortress and betrays them to the giant spider Shelob.

== Contents ==
The Tower of Cirith Ungol and Shelob's Lair describes the fortress of Cirith Ungol and provides floor plans. It also details the history of the fortress, which had originally been built by Gondor to prevent Mordor's creatures from escaping into Gondor. The book describes the catacombs under the fortress, including Torech Ungol, Shelob's lair. Climate, vegetation, animal life and the giant spiders that inhabit this area are detailed. The book also describes the other Gondorian fortress in the area, Minas Ithil (called Minas Morgul in the time of LotR). The book includes game statistics for Shelob, magic items, poisons and medicinal herbs.

Three adventures are set in the Second Age, when Cirith Ungol was still a Gondorian fortress:

- "A Bounty Hunt": The adventurers must hunt down a murderous orc who is hiding in the catacombs near Cirith Ungol.
- "Rescue from the Tower": Evil or neutral aligned characters are hired by the Necromancer (Sauron) to rescue one of his agents, who is being held in Cirith Ungol by Gondorians.
- "Assault on Shelob's Lair": The adventurers plan an assault on Torech Ungol, hoping to loot Shelob's treasure.

One adventure is set in the Fourth Age:

- "The Tower after the Fall of Sauron": Cirith Ungol lies undefended for the first time in 4000 years. Who knows what treasures lie hidden within its walls?

== Publication history ==
Tolkien Enterprises granted an exclusive, worldwide license to ICE in 1982 to create and market role-playing games based on LotR. ICE quickly developed Middle-earth Role Playing, and then developed a long line of source books dealing with various geographical areas of Middle-earth. One of these was The Tower of Cirith Ungol and Shelob's Lair, a 32-page book designed by Carl Willner, with cover art by Chris White, cartography by Peter Fenlon, and interior art by Charles Peale, published by ICE in 1984. A French-language version was published by Hexagonal in 1988.

== Reception ==
In Issue 32 of Abyss, Dave Nalle was intrigued, writing "What makes this module interesting and sets it apart from more common fare is that they are not merely dungeons or other hack and slash situations, but extensive and useful regional and situational background as well, which makes the adventures more generally useful." Nalle warned, "The situation while straightforward is a bit too challenging for the average munchkin, as it requires enough thought to use tact and evasion rather than sword and spear." Nalle concluded, "On the whole, this is a good adventure, with useful background information, though it could be somewhat more novel."

In the British RPG magazine Imagine, Andy Blakeman stated "As usual, there is all the detail one could wish for on land, climate, politics and power, and of course, Cirith Ungol."

In The Space Gamer No. 73, William A. Barton commented "Several suggested adventures provide plenty of play ideas. This is the best of the adventure modules published so far."

The French game magazine Jeux & Stratégie reviewed the French version and reported "This book provides ample space for numerous adventures. It is also unique in that it can be used with all fantasy role-playing games (conversion tables included). Calling all heroes and warriors from distant lands!"
