= Neidlinger =

Neidlinger is a surname. Notable people with the surname include:

- Bruce Neidlinger, American game designer
- Buell Neidlinger (1936–2018), American cellist and double-bassist
- Gustav Neidlinger (1910–1991), German opera singer
- Jim Neidlinger (born 1964), American baseball player
