= Dicemaster: Wilds of Doom =

Dicemaster: Wilds of Doom is a 1996 collectible dice game supplement published by Iron Crown Enterprises for Dicemaster: Cities of Doom.

== Gameplay ==
Dicemaster: Wilds of Doom is a supplement in which 26 additional dice are featured, and which is designed for use by two players sharing a single set. It aims to enrich the original game's mechanics by intensifying monster battles—introducing multi-round creature combat and special dice for enemies. New features also include turn-limiting rules and advanced weapon upgrades for characters, layered atop increased overall complexity.

== Publication history ==
Wilds of Doom is the inaugural expansion for Cities of Doom.

== Reception ==
Steve Faragher reviewed Dicemaster: Wilds of Doom for Arcane magazine, rating it a 6 out of 10 overall, and stated that "in practice they tend to make the straightforwardly fun basic game just too cumbersome and the large quantities of dice-rolling required stop being amusing and become a chore. If you just love complex games, this could be something you may enjoy. Otherwise, though, it tends to detract from the simple fun which is COD's greatest."

== Reviews ==
- Backstab #3
