= Umbar: Haven of the Corsairs =

Role-playing game supplement

Umbar: Haven of the Corsairs is a 1982 fantasy role-playing game supplement published by Iron Crown Enterprises.

== Contents ==
Umbar: Haven of the Corsairs is a supplement which details the pirate city of Umbar, which Aragorn took over at the end of the Third Age.

== Publication history ==
Umbar was the second area module published by Iron Crown for their Middle-Earth series, after Angmar.

== Reception ==
William A. Barton reviewed Umbar in The Space Gamer No. 61. Barton commented that "Umbar is quite worth the price if you're looking for a place for fantasy adventures that has the flavor of Middle-Earth, yet is far enough from the occurrences of the books to leave plenty of room for independent action."

Jonathan Sutherland reviewed the Umbar - Haven of the Corsairs for White Dwarf #50, giving it an overall rating of 7 out of 10, and stated that "Covered in a most impressive manner are the full plans of the city together with the sewers, water supply, house plans, taverns, military structures, all those who live in them; the numerous Guilds, smugglers, City Guard, religions, ships and the sailors who frequent the city."
