= Angmar: Land of the Witch King =

1982 Role-playing supplement

Angmar: Land of the Witch King is a fantasy role-playing sourcebook published by Iron Crown Enterprises (I.C.E.) in 1982 based on J.R.R. Tolkien's The Lord of the Rings trilogy. The book expands upon Tolkien's few brief mentions of Angmar, an evil kingdom, providing gamemasters with enough material to create a setting in which player characters can experience Angmar.

== Contents ==
In 1982, under license from the Tolkien estate, I.C.E. had previously published A Campaign and Adventure Guidebook for Middle-earth, a role-playing game generally set in Tolkien's Middle-earth.

The same year, I.C.E. also published Angmar, a 160-page softcover sourcebook for the same role-playing game system, with information about the evil witch-kingdom of Angmar that had risen in the millennia before the events described in The Lord of the Rings. The book covers much disparate material about the evil land including the landscapes, weather, various cities and towns, and inhabitants (including ogres and a dragon). The book includes a double-sided 16" x 21" map sheet.

Two years later, in 1984, when I.C.E. published a role-playing game system called Middle-earth Role Playing (MERP), previously published source material such as Angmar, A Campaign and Adventure Guidebook for Middle-earth, The Court of Ardor in Southern Middle Earth and Moria: The Dwarven City were retroactively brought under the MERP umbrella.

== Reception ==
In the March 1983 edition of The Space Gamer (No. 61), William A. Barton liked the sourcebook, saying, "Angmar holds a lot of promise for anyone who's been wanting to adventure in Middle-Earth. If the rest of the series is as good, I.C.E. will definitely have a winner on its hands."

Jonathan Sutherland reviewed the Angmar - Land of the Witchking for White Dwarf #50, giving it an overall rating of 7 out of 10, and stated that "The detailing of the whole area is on a tremendous scale, in this 48-page supplement. The drawings of both maps, floor plans and illustrations are competent."

In the May 1996 edition of Dragon (Issue 229), Rick Swan took a retrospective look at Angmar, which had been published 14 years earlier. Swan still found much to like about it, saying it was "noteworthy for... stunning attention to detail" and benefited from "generally strong writing." Swan was impressed with the book's "analysis of military affairs" and "imaginative essays (herb lore, orcish nomenclature, and castle design)" and found the book to be well-organized and "tightly edited", but questioned the lack of an index. Swan also criticized the overall tone, saying the authors "tend to emphasize the whimsical too much." He also thought that for an evil witch kingdom, "Angmar oozes gloom but it doesn't seem particularly menacing." Most importantly, Swan questioned the absence of any adventures or adventure hooks. Nonetheless, he gave Angmar an above-average rating of 5 out of 6, calling it a "first-rate sourcebook, meticulously researched and staggeringly complete. Iron Crown did just about everything right."

== Reviews ==
- Jeux et Stratégie #51
