= Richard Britton =

Richard Britton may refer to:

- Richard Britton (motorcyclist) (1970–2005), motorcycle road racer from Northern Ireland
- Richard Britton (athlete) (born 1976), Grenadian athlete
- Rick Britton, American historian and game publishing executive
