= Elemental Companion =

Tabletop role-playing game supplement

Elemental Companion is a supplement published by Iron Crown Enterprises in 1989 for the fantasy role-playing game Rolemaster.

Cover art by Steve Hickman, 1989

== Contents ==
Elemental Companion is a supplement which describes, in game terms, twenty-two different elements, such as plasma, aether, nexus, and time, and the realms where each of these elements holds sway. Descriptions of various denizens of these planes are described. The book details what player characters can do with each element in terms of skills, professions, elemental beings and creatures, and elemental combat. The book also presents information on how to use the material with Shadow World.

== Publication history ==
Elemental Companion is 144-page softcover book written by Mark Carlyle, with illustrations by Roger Raupp and Shawn Sharp, and cover art by Steve Hickman.

== Reception ==
In the May 1991 edition of Dragon (Issue #169), Ken Rolston thought "The niftiest feature of Elemental Companion is its medieval scholastic style of rationalizing the interactions of elemental forces to produce the magical effects encountered in a fantasy world. This scheme has lots of charm and also has interesting implications for adventuring in a fantasy setting." Rolston also liked the lists of new spells, which he called, "extensive and pretty neat, particularly when they extrapolate some aspect of elemental theory into a magic effect." Rolston thought the treatment of elemental creatures to be "extensive and encyclopedia", but asked why they were all "unsubtle, nasty, psychologically uninteresting monsters. (Why aren't there more Joe Average, silent-majority-type citizens in the other elemental planes?)" Although Rolston had reservations about adding more complexity to an already complex game system, he concluded, "as an example of intelligent, entertaining, and imaginative extension of spell-list magic systems, Elemental Companion is a good read and a promising source of fantasy ideas."

In his 1991 book Heroic Worlds, Lawrence Schick noted "Be careful with that Proto-Elemental Material! (Is there a rule that says other-dimensional supplements for fantasy games must always be extremely wacko?)"

== Reviews ==
- Casus Belli #58
