= Dunland and the Southern Misty Mountains =

1987 fantasy role-playing game supplement

Dunland
- Cover art by Walter Velez
- Designers: Randall Doty
- Illustrators: Walter Velez; Jim Holloway; Pete Fenlon
- Publishers: Iron Crown Enterprises
- Publication: 1987
- Genres: Tolkien fantasy

Dunland and the Southern Misty Mountains is a supplement published by Iron Crown Enterprises (ICE) in 1987 for the fantasy role-playing game Middle-earth Role Playing, which is itself based on the works of J.R.R. Tolkien.

== Background ==
In Tolkien's published history of Middle Earth, Dunland is an area that lies between Rohan and the southern Misty Mountains. Five hundred years before the events of The Lord of the Rings, the tribes of herders and hunters that lived there, the Dunlendings, were forced from their ancestral lands by the Rohirrim, who then founded their kingdom of Rohan. The Dunlendings moved north, but never forgot the lands they had lost, leading to centuries of conflict between Dunland and Rohan. The historic bitterness of the Dunlendings makes them a target for the propaganda of both Saruman and Sauron, who both seek to woo them as allies in the fight against Rohan and Gondor.

== Setting ==
The role-playing supplement Dunland and the Southern Misty Mountains gives a description of Dunland at 1640 of the Third Age, about a thousand years before the kingdom of Rohan was founded, and 1500 years before the events of The Lord of the Rings, when Dunland stretched from the Misty Mountains all the way to the border of Gondor. The supplement then details the misfortunes of the Dunlendings from that time to the time of The Lord of the Rings.

In addition to a history of the area, notable personalities and monsters are given, as well as Dunnish tribes and their various alliances and conflicts. Several sites of interest are described in detail.

The book includes eight adventures, four set in the southern Misty Mountains, and four set in Dunland:

1. A Call from Singing Hill: The party must go to the Singing Hill and investigate a castle that makes strange noises according to local tribes of Dunnish folk.
2. Trading with the Giants: A young trader wishes to have help as he trades with some Giants in the Misty Mountains.
3. Assault on a Lazy Dragon: The party buys a map to a sleeping dragon's lair.
4. Finding a Southern Pass: The party is hired to find a route over the mountains between Dunland and Northern Calenardhon.
5. A Troll Hunt: Trolls have troubled some local tribes, and a bounty is being offered to all adventurers for each troll that is killed.
6. Mission for the King: The party is hired to find the source of illegal herbs.
7. Sacrifice for Justice: The daughter of a landowner has been kidnapped by a rival clan.
8. A Clan War: The party must intercept a clan raiding party.

== Publication history ==
ICE published the licensed game Middle Earth Role-Playing in 1982, and then released many supplements for it over the next 17 years, until the Tolkien Estate withdrew their license in 1999. Dunland and the Southern Misty Mountains was published by ICE in 1987, a 64-page softcover book written by Randall Doty, with cartography by Pete Fenlon, interior art by Jim Holloway, and cover art by Walter Velez.

== Reception ==
In the December 1988 issue of Graal, Fabrice Sarelli noted the timelessness of this setting, where "a perpetual struggle ensues between Dunlendings and Rohirrim." Sarelli also pointed out the many campaign possibilities amongst the Dunlending tribes, given that "The Dunlendings are the target of Sauron and his servants."

== Other recognition ==
A copy of Dunland and the Southern Misty Mountains is held in the J.R.R. Tolkien Collection of Raynor Library at Marquette University. (Series 5.5, Box 3).
