= Erech and the Paths of the Dead =

Artwork by Gail McIntosh, 1985

Erech and the Paths of the Dead is a supplement published by Iron Crown Enterprises (ICE) in 1985 for the fantasy role-playing game Middle-earth Role Playing, which is itself based on the works of J.R.R. Tolkien.

== Contents ==
=== Background ===
In Tolkien's published history of Middle Earth, a people called the Daen Coentis ruled a kingdom on either side of the White Mountains at the end of the Second Age, and built a subterranean passage under the mountains to join the two provinces. They swore an oath of allegiance to Elendil and Isildur, but when called upon to join the Last Alliance against Sauron, they refused. The oath-breakers were cursed for their treachery, their spirits unable to depart from Middle Earth until they fulfill their oath to the True King.

In The Lord of the Rings, after the fall of Saruman, Aragorn looks into the palantír of Orthanc and foresees that the Corsairs of Umbar will aid the siege of Minas Tirith unless he can immediately intervene. He doesn't have time to take the road around the White Mountains from Rohan to Gondor, so he and his companions dare to take the ancient subterranean passage now known as the Paths of the Dead and guarded by the spirits of the oath-breakers. Once he emerges at the other end of the path, Aragorn calls the spirits to the Stone of Erech, and as Isildur's heir, demands that they fulfill their oath. They acquiesce, and Aragorn leads them into battle against the Corsairs of Umbar.

=== Setting ===
The role-playing supplement Erech and the Paths of the Dead is set in 1640 of the Third Age, about mid way between the time of the broken oath and the events of The Lord of the Rings. The kingdom of the oath-breakers is long gone, replaced by Rohan and Gondor, and the supplement describes in detail the Vale of Erech at the southern end of the Paths of the Dead, now Gondor's province of Morthond. The city Sarn Erech and the fortress of Morthondost are described. The text includes notable buildings and people, and a table of sample prices for goods. The forbidden Paths of the Dead linking Rohan to Gondor are described.

As well as providing advice on how to set up adventures in this area, two adventures are sketched out.

1. Prince Arador of Morthond wants to loot the tombs in the Paths of the Dead, and seeks a party of those willing to risk the dangers in order to provide him with a map to the richest treasures.
2. Prince Arador has recently taken the throne after a plague killed his father and the heir to the throne, his older sister Aranwen. But rumours have surfaced that Arador faked his sister's death, and that she is being held in captivity.

== Publication history ==
ICE published the licensed game Middle Earth Role-Playing in 1982, and then released many supplements for it over the next 17 years, until the Tolkien Estate withdrew their license in 1999. Erech and the Paths of the Dead was the 13th supplement to be published by ICE, a 40-page softcover book written by Ruth Sochard, with cartography by Pete Fenlon, interior art by Stephan Peregrine, Jessica Ney, and Olivia Johnston, and cover art by Gail McIntosh.

== Reception ==
In the April 1986 edition of White Dwarf (Issue #76), Graham Staplehurst found much to like about this supplement, calling it, "very well laid out, neat, accessible and suitably illustrated." But he questioned why a major part of the book was devoted to the Paths of the Dead — "nothing more than a collection of tunnels beset with traps and monsters." He concluded by giving it an excellent overall rating of 9 out of 10, saying, "Nobody in their right mind would walk the Paths of the Dead [...] so why bother with pages of details? I find the notes on cultures, natural history, etc, a lot more interesting."
