= Mjolnir LLC =

Role-playing game company

Mjolnir, LLC
- Company type: private
- Industry: Gaming
- Founded: 2001
- Key people: Bruce Neidlinger (CEO) Heike Kubasch (President) and Stephen Hardy
- Products: HARP, Rolemaster
- Website: http://www.ironcrown.com

Mjolnir LLC was a company that produced licensed products of the defunct game company Iron Crown Enterprises (I.C.E.) under an agreement with Aurigas Aldebaron LLC, who had purchased I.C.E.'s assets following its bankruptcy.

== History ==
Iron Crown Enterprises (I.C.E.) was a game company that produced role-playing, board, miniature, and collectible card games such as Middle-earth Role Playing, Rolemaster, and Spacemaster for twenty years.

When I.C.E. went bankrupt in 2000, holding company Aurigas Aldebaron LLC purchased the rights to I.C.E.'s name and intellectual properties. Shortly afterwards, it licensed these out to Phoenix LLC, a company headed by CEO Bruce Neidlinger and President Heike Kubasch.

Phoenix LLC renamed itself Mjolnir LLC and using the name "I.C.E.", began publishing I.C.E. products in 2002.

The following year, Mjolnir released a new role-playing game, High Adventure Role Playing (HARP), a simplified version of I.C.E.'s Rolemaster role-playing game rules system, that garnered favorable reviews and won a Silver ENnie in the "Best Non-d20 Game of 2004" category.

Despite this, HARP did not enjoy much success, and by 2005 Mjolnir was ailing financially. Although the company continued to produce products for HARP and Rolemaster, it was not able to establish a strong player base for either product. In early January 2011, Aurigas Aldebaron LLC announced that despite "foregoing a substantial amount of royalties which provided cash support for Mjolnir LLC to correct this situation", Mjolnir had not been able to reach financial viability, and Aurigas Aldebaron was withdrawing the I.C.E. license from Mjolnir. Shortly afterward, Aurigas Aldebaron transferred the I.C.E. license to Guild Companion Publications Ltd.
