= Cleric's Revenge =

1985 fantasy board game

- Designers: Rick Britton
- Publishers: I.C.E.
- Publication: 1985
- Genres: Fantasy

Cleric's Revenge is a fantasy board wargame published by Iron Crown Enterprises (I.C.E.) in 1985.

== Gameplay ==
Cleric's Revenge is a game in which two 30‑unit armies of numbered heroes and villains maneuver across printed terrain in a hex‑based fantasy skirmish game, using variable movement, special abilities, and dice‑driven combat to locate and capture the opposing army's hidden chest‑of‑gold card. Terrain has a strong effect, and each type of combat unit has advantages and disadvantages.

== Publication history ==
Rick Britton, one of the nine founders of I.C.E. in 1980, designed the fantasy wargame Cleric's Revenge, which was released in 1985.

== Reception ==
Dave Nalle, writing in Abyss, liked the "lovely map" and the "rather attractively illustrated stand-up character cards." Nalle found the rules to be "very basic and the strategies are somewhat limited, but the first few plays are a lot of fun as the players learn the different obstacles and character capabilities." Nalle thought that it was a game for younger players, noting "I think it will pale fairly quickly for anyone beyond their middle teens." Nalle concluded, "It is a well put together and enjoyable game within its limits."
