= Middle-earth Role Playing Combat Screen =

Tabletop fantasy role-playing game supplement

Combat Screen
and reference sheets for use with; Middle-Earth Role Playing
- Designers: Chris White
- Publishers: Iron Crown Enterprises
- Publication: 1984; 41 years ago
- Genres: Fantasy
- Systems: Streamlined Rolemaster

Middle-earth Role Playing Combat Screen is a 1984 fantasy role-playing game supplement published by Iron Crown Enterprises for Middle-earth Role Playing.

== Contents ==
Middle-earth Role Playing Combat Screen is a gamemaster's screen, which provides a comprehensive reference for quick use.

== Publication history ==
Middle-earth Role Playing Combat Screen was written by Chris White and was published by Iron Crown Enterprises in 1984 as two cardstock screens, and two 11" x 17" sheets.

== Reception ==
Andy Blakeman reviewed Middle-earth Role Playing Combat Screen for Imagine magazine and stated that "one could easily photocopy the tables straight from the rulebook - no new material is presented - for far less than the selling price of the Screen; and ICE could have granted permission for players to do so. As it is, they are selling people something they already have at a price they can hardly afford."

Jeux & Stratégie #46 commented that the screen does not reach the "fantastic" of Tolkien's work, and the illustrations are only of average quality, but that the gamemaster will find all the tables necessary allowing to complete a game without constantly referring to the rulebook, and lamented that this screen does not contain a scenario which would have given this accessory a plus.

== Other recognition ==
- A copy of Middle-earth Role Playing Combat Screen is held in the collection of the Strong National Museum of Play (object 110.224.19).
- A copy of Middle-earth Role Playing Combat Screen is held in the Edwin and Terry Murray Collection of Role-Playing Games, 1972-2017 at Duke University (Container Volume 971).
