= The Fellowship of the Ring (board game) =

Board game

The Fellowship of the Ring is a 1983 board game published by Iron Crown Enterprises.

== Gameplay ==
The Fellowship of the Ring is a game based on The Lord of the Rings which depicts the events from the hobbits fleeing the shire up to the Fellowship reaching Mordor.

== Reception ==
Rick Swan reviewed Fellowship of the Ring in Space Gamer No. 71. Swan commented that "A solitaire system allowing the Fellowship to find its way across the land, making discoveries and encountering resistance along the way, might be a better way to capture the adventurous feel of the books. [...] In any case, in spite of the best intentions, Fellowship of the Ring is little more than a nice try."

== Reviews ==
- Analog Science Fiction and Fact
