= Trolls of the Misty Mountains =

Tabletop role-playing game supplement

Cover art by Daniel Horne, 1986

Trolls of the Misty Mountains is a supplement published by Iron Crown Enterprises (ICE) in 1986 for the fantasy role-playing game Middle-earth Role Playing (MERP), which is itself based on the works of J.R.R. Tolkien.

== Description ==
=== Background ===
In The Hobbit, Tolkien's precursor to The Lord of the Rings, Bilbo Baggins and his companions encounter some of the denizens that live under the Misty Mountains.

=== Contents ===
This book contains three adventures that take place in the vestiges of the former kingdom of Rhudaur that once lay against the eastern side of the Misty Mountains. The time is 1600 years after the defeat of Sauron by the Last Alliance of Elves and Men, and 1500 years before the events described in The Hobbit and The Lord of the Rings. It includes a set of three adventures, each with an increasing difficulty over the previous one.

The adventurers are hired to reconnoitre the route of a proposed road to be built between the keeps of Daenos and Elnost, rooting out any potential dangers such as trolls and orcs. To do this, they must complete three adventures:

- "Adventure at Duildin Hill": The adventurers are hired by local farmers to stop depredations by trolls.
- "Adventure at the Village of Garkash": The adventurers discover a goblin village quite close to the proposed road.
- "Adventure at Maes Fao": The adventurers must root out and destroy a pair of Dunedain brothers who are agents of the Witch-King of Angmar

== Publication history ==
ICE published the licensed game Middle Earth Role-Playing in 1982, and then released many supplements for it over the next 17 years, until the Tolkien Estate withdrew their license in 1999. Trolls of the Misty Mountains was written by John Cresswell and Mike Cresswell, with a cover by Daniel Horne, cartography by Jessica Ney, and illustrations by Denis Loubet, and was published by Iron Crown Enterprises in 1986 as a 32-page book. I.C.E. revisited this area in later publications including Phantom of the Northern Marches (1986), Dark Mage of Rhudaur (1989), and Arnor (1994).

== Reception ==
In Issue 39 of Abyss, John Davies noted "These three scenarios are well designed but surprisingly unsophisticated, and the whole package seems aimed at younger readers." He also pointed out that all three adventures were "very reward-oriented, sort of seek and find type situations, characteristic of material designed for younger players." Davies also found the adventures, at 3–4 hours each, were "rather brief." Davies concluded, "These complaints aside, the adventures are well crafted, and while they may not present any mental challenges or great original themes, they are playable and moderately interesting."

In the December 1986 edition of Adventurer (Issue 6, Jon Sutherland was unimpressed, saying, "This is awful, boring and hack [...] The link with Tolkien’s source materials is flimsy, and the adventures are reminiscent of the old Judges Guild modules." He concluded with a recommendation to avoid this book, saying, "You would have thought that with all the rich background and the relatively high quality of the other ’ready-to-run’ modules, that the thirty -two pages would have something half decent in them. This is not the case."

Graham Staplehurst reviewed Trolls of the Misty Mountains for White Dwarf #87, and stated that "there is perhaps something less than original in its basis. Although useful for a GM without time to produce their own adventures, the module slips a little from the excellent standards previously set by ICE."

Denis Beck, in the April 1987 edition of Casus Belli (Issue #37), called these adventures "very classic." His only complaint was "the meagerness of the historical background, which risks confusing a beginner gamemaster."
