= The Iron Wind =

Tabletop role-playing game supplement

- Designers: Terry Amthor; Coleman Charlton; Pete Fenlon; Olivia Johnston; Heike Kubasch; Stephen Moffatt
- Publishers: Iron Crown Enterprises
- Publication: 1st edition: 1980; 2nd edition: 1984
- Genres: Fantasy

The Iron Wind is a role-playing game campaign setting published by Iron Crown Enterprises (I.C.E.) in 1980 that could be used with any game system such as Dungeons & Dragons. In 1984, I.C.E. published a second edition for their new fantasy role-playing game Rolemaster.

== Contents ==
The Iron Wind is a supplement describing the island of Mur Fostisyr, and how its people have succumbed to the influence of the evil force known as the Iron Wind. In the second edition, Mur Fostisyr became the campaign setting of I.C.E.'s Loremaster series, later called Shadow World.

== Publication history ==
In the late 1970s, Pete Fenlon, Coleman Charlton, and Kurt Fischer enjoyed playing the fantasy role-playing game D&D while they attended the University of Virginia. After graduating in 1980, the group founded Iron Crown Enterprises (I.C.E.) to publish their house rules. Their first book was a set of combat rules titled Arms Law. This was followed by a campaign setting, The Iron Wind, which could be used with any role-playing game system.

By 1984, I.C.E. had developed the Rolemaster game system, and published a revised and expanded edition of The Iron Wind that used Rolemaster rules. This edition, designed by Terry Amthor, Coleman Charlton, Pete Fenlon, Olivia Johnston, Heike Kubasch, and Stephen Moffatt, included three short scenarios as examples of possible adventures in this setting.

== Reception ==
In The Space Gamer No. 36 (February 1981), William A. Barton commented "an imaginative game master should be able to make much of The Iron Wind as an addition to his fantasy campaign - or as a campaign in itself. Non-D&Ders will have to do some extra work to fit it into their systems, but should find the result quite worth the time spent."

In the March 1982 edition of Different Worlds, Patrick Amory stated "Iron Crown promises more in the same series. Whatever may come, Mur Fosityr is a worthy setting for your campaign, and The Iron Wind is a splendid new effort in pre-packaged worlds, well worth the money."

In Issue 32 of Abyss, Dave Nalle reviewed the second edition and commented, "The background is nicely developed, more original that their [MERP] material, and probably of greater interest to experienced gamers. The maps and presentation are excellent, the background is well thought out, and lots of interesting detail is provided." Nalle concluded, "On the whole, I'd recommend The Iron Wind, and I wish they'd publish more aids for this pleasant setting."

In the British RPG magazine Imagine, Andy Blakeman reviewed the second edition and wrote "this is a worthwhile campaign pack – suitable for any rules system, I might add, and free-standing of other Loremaster products."

Lester W. Smith and Rick Swan did a point/counterpoint review of the second edition of The Iron Wind in Space Gamer No. 75. Smith commented "All things considered, I heartily recommend The Iron Wind as a fascinating setting for campaigning or as source material. Read it and you'll feel you've been there." Swan countered "In spite of I.C.E.'s claim that The Iron Wind is a campaign module, it's not – at least not by my definition. This is just another background encyclopedia, and not a particularly original one at that. I admire the effort, but I can't shake the feeling that I've seen it all before."
