= Warlords (card game) =

Collectible card game

- Designers: Ian Trout
- Publishers: Iron Crown Enterprises
- Players: 2-8
- Playing time: ~1 hour
- Chance: Some
- Age range: 10+
- Skills: Card playing Arithmetic; Basic Reading Ability

Warlords is an out-of-print multiplayer fantasy collectible card game published in September 1997 by Iron Crown Enterprises. It is based on material from the video game Warlords III, for which Iron Crown licensed the intellectual property from Strategic Studies Group (SSG). It was designed by a team with Ian Trout of SSG. The 351-card set was sold in starter decks of 60 cards and booster packs of 12 cards. Each of the eight different starter decks consisted of a fixed number of cards related to one of the factions, with the remainder of the cards randomly included from the set of non-faciton cards.

== Gameplay ==
The objective is to become the first player to become the supreme Warlord. This is achieved by exploring, finding treasure, or waging war by assembling followers, gathering armies, and building citadels. The game was criticized for using a "Combat Resolution Table" where a player would add the Battle Value of their Army, Hero, Ally, and Artefact (sic) in a given stack, add terrain bonuses, subtracts the defender's total Battle Value, and then compare it to the table to determine the number of cards lost in each stack. The cards had no rarities and lacked tournament support at the time.

== Reception ==
The reviewer from the online second volume of Pyramid stated that "Warlords. One of the best tactical combat games ever created for home computers. [...] Now it's a trading card game designed by the same folks as the computer games, and let me tell you its one of the most enjoyable TCGs I've played yet."
