= Kevin Barrett (game designer) =

Canadian role-playing game designer

- Occupation: Game designer

Kevin Barrett is a game designer who has worked primarily on role-playing games.

== Career ==
Kevin Barrett collaborated with Terry K. Amthor in the creation of Spacemaster (1985), the science-fiction version of Rolemaster, which also had a second edition in 1988. Barrett designed Silent Death (1990), which initially used the background from Spacemaster, and was the first miniatures game released by Iron Crown Enterprises.

Barrett had left ICE by 1992. He was later employed as writer with BioWare.
