= Dicemaster: Cities of Doom =

1996 collectible dice game

Dicemaster: Cities of Doom is a 1996 collectible dice game published by Iron Crown Enterprises.

== Gameplay ==
Dicemaster: Cities of Doom is a game in which dungeon-crawling board game tropes are blended with dice mechanics. It transforms classic gaming elements into a colorful array of dice, with players taking on familiar fantasy roles to chase mystical runes and summon a legendary book.

Gameplay is structured around constructing and traversing adventure routes with location dice, battling monsters, and managing resources via Action dice. These dice determine movement, magic, and interference tactics, and are also key to discovering runes. Combat emphasizes strategic rerolling of special dice, with risk-reward dynamics like losing dice to "burning skull" faces. Additional complexity arises through mechanics like weapon upgrades, rune theft, and monster enhancements.

== Publication history ==
Wilds of Doom was the inaugural expansion for Cities of Doom.

== Reception ==
Steve Faragher reviewed Dicemaster: Cities of Doom for Arcane magazine, rating it a 7 out of 10 overall, and stated that "Cities of Doom is a good, fun game, but it's perhaps a bit disappointing that its subject matter is nothing more than a dungeon hack under a different name. Good for passing some spare time, sure enough - but it's not going to revolutionise gaming. Nor will it become another Dragon Dice."

== Reviews ==
- Backstab #3
