= Gail B. McIntosh =

American artist

- Known for: Fantasy art

Gail B. McIntosh is an artist whose work has appeared in role-playing games.

== Early life and education ==
Gail B. McIntosh studied at the Pennsylvania Academy of the Fine Arts in Philadelphia and at the Accademia di Belle Arti di Firenze in Florence, Italy and then as an apprentice for one year to sculptor Antonio Berti.

== Career ==
Gail B. McIntosh is known for her work on Middle-earth Role Playing books.
