= The Court of Ardor in Southern Middle Earth =

1983 fantasy role-playing game supplement

- Publishers: Iron Crown Enterprises
- Publication: 1983
- Genres: Role-playing
- Parent games: Middle-earth Role Playing
- ISBN: 9780047930713

The Court of Ardor in Southern Middle Earth is a 1983 fantasy role-playing game supplement published by Iron Crown Enterprises for Middle-earth Role Playing.

== Contents ==
The Court of Ardor in Southern Middle Earth is a supplement which describes the lands of far southern Middle-earth.

== Reception ==
Jonathan Sutherland reviewed the Court of Ardor - In Southern Middle Earth for White Dwarf #50, giving it an overall rating of 7 out of 10, and stated that "The format is the same as the previous volumes, and as well as the major characteristics, mentioning Sauron's influence in the land, the nature of society and suggested scenarios for the players."

Robert E. James reviewed Ardor for Fantasy Gamer magazine and stated that "Ardor is not for inexperienced gamers, nor is it for hack-and-slash enthusiasts. It is for those who love a coherent world, a plot that won't quit, and a long-term campaign, Ardor is a great addition to I.C.E.'s version of Middle-earth, and I look for the next serving anxiously."

William A. Barton reviewed The Court of Ardor in Southern Middle Earth in The Space Gamer No. 73. Barton commented that "It is notable in covering an area that is completedly removed from those in which LOTR is set, allowing GMs and players the greatest freedom of action without fear of changing the history of Middle-earth as outlined in LOTR. A lot of original material here."
