= High Adventure Role Playing =

- HARP logo
- Designers: Tim Dugger & Heike A. Kubasch
- Publishers: Iron Crown Enterprises
- Publication: December 12, 2003
- Genres: Fantasy
- Systems: percentile

High Adventure Role Playing (HARP) is a 2003 fantasy role-playing game, designed by Tim Dugger & Heike A. Kubasch, and published by Iron Crown Enterprises (ICE).

== Background ==
HARP is produced by Iron Crown Enterprises, the same company that produces Rolemaster, but the mechanics of the system are very much simplified in comparison. The system also takes cues from the d20 system.

== System ==
The HARP book is 15 chapters long, with the first nine devoted to character generation.

=== Professions ===
HARP has Professions that determine which sets of skills are favoured or not, many also provide level bonuses to skills, spell spheres and/or talents. The Professions in HARP Revised are: Cleric, Fighter, Harper, Mage, Monk, Ranger, Rogue, Thief, and Warrior Mage. Additional professions are found in other support books and include: Paladin, Beastmaster, Elementalist, Thaumaturge, Necromancer, Vivimancer, Adventurer, Mystic, Shadowblade, & Druid. HARP's Professions are designed to be flexible, with a single level progression chart allowing the player to build the character he or she wants from the base profession.

=== Statistics ===
A system of eight statistics are used for characters featuring Strength, Constitution, Agility, Quickness, Self Discipline, Reasoning, Insight and Presence. Statistics range from 1 to 105.

Statistics are generated during character creation one of three ways: -

- The first is to roll 1d100 eight times (re-rolling any result below 40) and assign the eight results.
- The second is to divide 550 points amongst the eight scores, with an increased cost to raise a score above 90.
- The third is to roll 10d10 and add the total to 500, then assigning that total to the scores as in method two.

Much of the game play revolves around the ability scores, (the Development Points that are used throughout the rest of character creation are based on these scores,) so a character generated with method one runs a risk of not being playable, though the chance of a highly exceptional score is possible.

=== Races and Cultures ===
Player characters in HARP belong to one of a set of fantasy races: Human, Dwarf, Elf, Gnome and Halfling; Harp adds the Gryx, a race who are physically similar to Orcs, with a more peaceful mentality.

HARP does not directly offer mixed races. Instead characters may purchase Greater and Lesser Blood Talents to customize their character. Greater Blood Talents reflect the more traditional half-race, (meaning that the character is half the Base Race and half the Race chosen with the Blood Talent,) while Lesser Blood Talents represent traits from inter-racial ancestors.

Cultures represent the other side to the nature versus nurture equation. These traits represent the character's upbringing, from nomadic and rural, to urban and underhill. These directly influence the character's background, starting location, clothing, demeanour and language. They provide a relatively standard set of cultural skill ranks called adolescent ranks. These skills are typical skills that most people in a culture will learn in their formative years.

==== Cyradon Races ====
There is also a new campaign setting offered by ICE which is called Gryphon World and has set its main focus on the continent of Cyradon. It offers a variation on the standard fantasy races, with the Dwarves becoming the Mablung, the Arali and Sithi replacing the normal elves, the Rhona a wise gnomish race, Nagazi a civilized lizard race, and Gryphons as a flying quadruped race.

Notably it excludes Halflings, orcs, goblins, kobolds and many other standard fantasy races and creatures by default.

=== Skills ===
There are 10 skill categories with 3-9 skills each, for a total of 60 skills. Some skills have sub-skills (that are a little more difficult to perform). Each profession receives 20 starting ranks, divided among their favored skill categories, and can build from there with development points.

Skills are used by rolling an open ended d100 (96-100 re-roll and add), adding your skill bonus and the related stat bonus, a modifier for the difficulty of the task, and trying to get over 101. Difficulty modifiers range from Mundane (+60) to Absurd (-100).

Spells are purchased in this stage as well, each spell is purchased as a separate skill. Several professions have a Professional Sphere of spells, and any character may purchase spells from the Universal Sphere. Spells are powered by Power Points, and in order to be able to cast a spell, a character must have a rank in that spell equal to the power points needed. Spells can be scaled upwardly, thereby increasing the required power points and skill ranks needed to cast the scaled version of the spell.

=== Talents ===
Talents are both inherent to the character's race and available as a form of character customization. In order to obtain a talent the character expends DP while creating or levelling up a character. GM's are encouraged to customize the available talents and even require in game explanations should they wish. Forty-one talents make up the Master List in HARP Revised Edition (though more are available in support material) and include Dark Vision, Blazing speed, Ambidexterity, Familiar, Athletic, Shapechanger and Outdoorsman.

Special Starting Items such as an Item of Quality or a Loyal Domesticated or Unusual Animal or Creature are also available, and while not talents, they are purchased in the same way.

=== Fate Points ===
Fate Points are a way to aid in dice rolls in critical circumstances or in reducing critical wounds, a single Fate Point is worth +50 on the dice or a -25 to the critical received and can be purchased at a cost of 5 development points to a maximum of 5 Fate Points. All new player characters begin with 3 fate points. These points are a method of allowing the heroic protagonists to achieve the heroic, they are not normally given to non player characters.

=== Training Packages ===
Training packages are sets of linked skills that come at a discount and hail from a common background. Characters may take one package per level. Examples include Bounty Hunter, Astothian Archer, Jade Dragon, and Tyrian Sage.

This allows quick customizations of professions within settings without the need to create a new profession. For example, in a military order within a campaign several training packages can be created to mimic troop specialization and or rank. Only one training package can be acquired by a character at each level.

== Awards ==
On August 21, 2004, HARP won the Silver ENnie for Best Non-d20 Game at Gen Con.

== Pricing ==
HARP is available from the OneBookShelf network It retails at $20.00 for an Adobe PDF version.
