= Terry K. Amthor =

American game designer

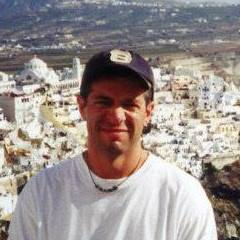
- Amthor in 2014
- Born: Terry Kevin Amthor; October 18, 1958; Chicago, Illinois, U.S.
- Died: September 25, 2021 (aged 62)
- Education: University of Virginia, B.S., Architecture
- Occupations: Game designer, author
- Website: www.eidolonstudio.com

Terry K. Amthor (October 18, 1958 – September 25, 2021) was an American game designer who worked primarily on role-playing games, and as a fantasy author.

== Early life and education ==
Amthor was born in Chicago but soon moved to Manitowoc, Wisconsin and then, at the age of six, to Bethel Park, Pennsylvania. He later attended Bethel Park High School. He was also the fiction editor of the school literary magazine Vernissage and a member of the ironically named physics and science enthusiasts club the Flat Earth Society.

He attended the University of Virginia School of Architecture in 1976. At UVA, he first discovered Dungeons & Dragons through a gaming group led by Pete Fenlon, who was running a campaign set in Middle-earth. While at UVA, he took a number of classes in architectural history, focusing on Greek, Roman, and Pre-Columbian architecture. He also took graduate-level classes in advanced mathematics and art history. Amthor went on to graduate in 1980 with a Bachelor of Science in Architectural Design, while maintaining his close associations with the Fenlon group throughout his college years. This association led to his participation in the founding of Iron Crown Enterprises.

Amthor's first published work was a Star Wars parody, "Raker Wars," for the University of Virginia weekly paper The Declaration.

== Career at ICE ==
Though Iron Crown Enterprises was founded and incorporated in 1980, initially it could afford few full-time employees. From 1980 to 1982, Terry Amthor worked at UVa's Fiske-Kimball Fine Arts Library and what was known then as the Sci-Tech Library Engineering and Science Library, serving in the bibliography departments of both libraries, and also contributing to the initial Library of Congress conversion from a card catalog to an online catalog, via OCLC.

Amthor was one of the original founders of Iron Crown Enterprises (ICE) in 1980, along with Pete Fenlon, S. Coleman Charlton, Richard H. Britton, Bruce Shelley, Bruce Neidlinger, Kurt Fischer, Heike Kubasch, and Olivia Johnston.

Amthor wrote Court of Ardor (1983), an early Middle-earth campaign game book published by ICE as a Rolemaster supplement. In many ways it did not follow the 'feel' of Middle-earth and Pete Fenlon in an interview years later referred to Ardor as a 'rogue' module. Perhaps ironically, Court of Ardor has since become one of the most sought after ICE Middle-earth sourcebooks on bidding sites.

Amthor was a major contributor to the original Rolemaster system, including Arms Law and Character Law, but mainly to Spell Law, working with Olivia Johnston. In particular, Amthor and Johnston worked to create the realm of Mentalism

Amthor wrote the first Middle-earth solo adventure book A Spy in Isengard, after the line was re-licensed to George Allen & Unwin, and had to be approved by a 'Tolkien Scholar'. A Spy in Isengard was eventually translated into several languages.

Amthor also collaborated with Kevin Barrett in the creation of Spacemaster (1985), the science-fiction version of Rolemaster, which also had a second edition in 1988.

While at ICE, Amthor also wrote many game supplements for Rolemaster, MERP, and Spacemaster, including some Spacemaster supplements under the pseudonym "A. Brooke Lindsay". In the early '80s he also wrote a multi-issue mystery story set in Spacemaster for Alarums and Excursions under another, even more fanciful, pseudonym, "Preston Eisenhower IV", which he also used as editor of the ICE's irregular tabloid, the IQ, or Iron Crown Quarterly.

He later gave over editorial duties to become Production Manager and eventually Art Director at ICE, as the company grew and the founders needed to assume new duties. He worked with acclaimed artist Angus McBride, at first through ICE's Art Director Rick Britton, and then personally, to help create some of ICE's most iconic Middle-earth covers, including Lorien.

The second edition of Rolemaster (1989) was supported by Amthor's Shadow World campaign setting, which combined the older Loremaster background with a larger setting. ICE needed its own fantasy world, and tapped Amthor to build on Fenlon's original Iron Wind and Vog Mur concepts, and create a unified fantasy world. He created a high-fantasy world with science fiction legacy elements. While superficially similar to standard fantasy (e.g., Elves, wizards), it has a complex history featuring numerous factions, good and evil, vying for control. Elves are portrayed as technology-obsessed, even to the point of being 'steampunk.'

Amthor also wrote an article for White Wolf Magazine, "Queer as a Three-sided Die", about being gay and a gamer.

Amthor was guest of honor at the Boras Spelkonvent 8, a gaming convention in Sweden, November 1990, and led a Middle-earth tournament.

== Later work ==
After leaving ICE full-time in 1992, Amthor co-founded Metropolis Ltd. in order to produce the English-language version of the controversial Swedish modern-horror game Kult. In 1992–1994, Amthor edited, co-authored and art-directed several books for the line.

He also wrote one module for Dungeons & Dragons: Thief's Challenge II: Beacon Point. Amthor says that it was initially difficult to get inspired about a generic adventure, and that he finds it much easier to write Shadow World and Space Master material. (despite that initial difficulty, the adventure has received some good acclaim.)

In 1992, Amthor founded Eidolon Studio, writing Shadow World supplements under license from ICE. He published the third edition of his Shadow World Master Atlas (2001) through Eidolon. He continued to write and produce RPG supplements for the current incarnation of Iron Crown Enterprises, Guild Companion Publications, until his death in 2021. Mjolnir LLC published the Shadow World Master Atlas Fourth Edition (2003), Amthor's 224-page compendium for the Shadow World. Shadow World Player Guide: The World (2010) by Amthor was a reintroduction to the Shadow World setting, and was published by Guild Companion Publications. He published his first fantasy novel, Loremaster Legacy, (set in the Shadow World environment) in 2013.

== Personal life ==
After graduating from the University of Virginia in 1980, Amthor continued to live in Charlottesville, Virginia until 1992. Then he moved to Arlington County, Virginia, until October 2015, when he moved back to Charlottesville, where he resided until his death. He travelled extensively, to the United Kingdom, Italy (Florence, Siena and Venice), Greece (Athens, Olympia, and several islands, including Crete, Mykonos, and Santorini), Turkey, Switzerland, and several countries in Central America to visit Maya Pre-Columbian era sites, including Chichen Itza, Tikal, Copán, and Tulum.

== Partial Publications List ==
=== At Iron Crown Enterprises ===
- The Iron Wind (co-author), Rolemaster, (1980)
- Spell Law (co-author). (1983, 1984)
- Court of Ardor in Southern Middle-earth (1983)
- The Cloudlords of Tanara. (1984)
- Space Master RPG (with Kevin Barrett) 1st and 2nd Editions. (1985, 1988, 1992)
- Action on Akaisha Outstation (1985)
- Lords of Middle-earth Vol 1: The Immortals (co-author) (1986)
- Lórien & The Halls of the Elven Smiths (1986)
- Lost Telepaths: House Kashmere (1986)
- Spacemaster Companion (co-author) (1986)
- League of Merchants (as A. Brooke Lindsay), (1987)
- Rivendell (1987)
- The Cygnus Conspiracy (as Alexander Brooke Lindsay III) (1987)
- A Spy in Isengard (Middle-earth Quest Solo Adventure) (1988)
- Teeth of Mordor (1988)
- Raiders from the Frontier (as Alexander Brooke Lindsay III) (1989)
- Shadow World Master Atlas 1st Edition (1989)
- Jaiman: Land of Twilight (1989)
- Shadow World: Emer the Great Continent (1990)
- Shadow World Master Atlas 2nd Edition (1992)
- Eidolon: City in the Sky (1992)

=== With Metropolis Ltd ===
- Kult RPG Core Rules. (Editor/graphic designer; additional English-language material). (1993)
- Kult: Legions of Darkness. (Editor/graphic designer; additional English-language material). (1994)

=== With Eidolon Studio ===
- Emer Atlas I: Haestra. (1997)
- Haalkitaine. (1998)
- Emer Atlas II: The Northeast. (1999)
- Shadow World Master Atlas 3rd Edition. (2001)
- The Loremaster Legacy. (Shadow World novel) (2013)

=== With the ‘new’ Iron Crown Enterprises/Guild Companion ===
- Powers of Light & Darkness. (2003)
- The Land of Xa-ar. (2010)
- Shadow World Player Guide: The World. (2010)
- The Cloudlords of Tanara. (Second Edition) (2013)
- Emer III: The Southeast. (2014)
- Tales from the Green Gryphon Inn. (2015)
- Eidolon: City in the Sky (Second Edition). (2015)
