= A Campaign and Adventure Guidebook for Middle-earth =

1982 role-playing game supplement

A Campaign and Adventure Guidebook for Middle-earth is a 1982 fantasy role-playing game supplement published by Iron Crown Enterprises.

== Contents ==
A Campaign and Adventure Guidebook for Middle-earth is a supplement which presents an overview of Middle Earth, including its geography, history, and inhabitants.

== Publication history ==
A Campaign and Adventure Guidebook for Middle-earth is the first official role-playing game material published based on Tolkien's fantasy works, and the first release from Iron Crown Enterprises in a series of play aids for role-playing in Middle Earth.

== Reception ==
William A. Barton reviewed A Campaign and Adventure Guidebook for Middle-earth in The Space Gamer No. 57. Barton commented that "Overall, the real usefulness of Middle Earth as a campaign aid will have to wait for subsequent modules in the series to be proven. Unless you're an absolute Tolkien fanatic and don't mind paying [...] you may want to hold off purchasing this one until others in the series are available for evaluation."

Jonathan Sutherland reviewed the Guidebook and Gridded Map for White Dwarf #50, giving it an overall rating of 6 out of 10, and stated that "The most useful section contains the trade routes, language areas and climate maps. Altogether, a useful package, if a little expensive, but [indispensable] because of the beautifully reproduced map."
