= Angus McBride =

British artist (1931–2007)

- Born: 11 May 1931; London, England
- Died: 15 May 2007 (aged 76); Ireland
- Education: Canterbury Cathedral Choir School
- Occupations: Historical and fantasy illustrator
- Children: 2

Angus McBride (11 May 1931 – 15 May 2007) was a historical and fantasy illustrator.

== Early life ==
Born in London to Highland Scottish parents, Angus McBride was orphaned as a child, his mother dying when he was five years old, and his father in World War II when Angus was 12. He was educated at the Canterbury Cathedral Choir School. He served his National Service in the Royal Fusiliers, and afterward got a job as an advertising artist.

== Career ==
Due to Britain's poor economic state immediately following World War II, McBride found it necessary to leave for South Africa. In Cape Town, he became a fairly well known and successful artist. However, he felt that he could not expand on his artistic plans in South Africa's small publishing industry. Consequently, in 1961, McBride moved back to Britain. He made his first works in educational magazines such as Finding Out and Look and Learn, World of Wonder and Bible Story. In 1975, he began to work with Osprey Publishing's Men-at-Arms series.

As England's economy again suffered in the 1970s, McBride moved with his family back to Cape Town, and continued to work with British and American publishers. He continued to do realistic, historical illustrations for Osprey Publishing, as well as other such work for other military-history publishers (Concord publications, Blandford Press, etc.). A series of miniatures were produced by Citadel Miniatures based on his illustrations within Medieval Warlords by Blandford Press.

In fantasy circles, McBride was well known for his illustrations for Iron Crown Enterprises' game Middle-earth Role Playing (MERP) based on J. R. R. Tolkien's writings.

Although a few of his paintings are in oils, McBride mostly preferred to work in gouache colours on illustration boards, making numerous detailed sketches of the composition before starting to paint.

In 2006, McBride moved to Ireland, where he continued to work. He died from a heart attack on 15 May 2007

== Legacy ==
In 2014, Scott Taylor of Black Gate, named Angus McBride as 9B in a list of The Top 10 RPG Artists of the Past 40 Years, saying: "He is a master of his craft, and because of him an entire fanbase has a hugely detailed collection of windows in the Tolkien's world that otherwise might never have been available."

In 2021, an illustration of a wizard staring into a crystal ball McBride created for Middle-Earth Quest became a viral internet meme with the caption "pondering my orb".

== Illustrations ==
- Life of Christ (1979)
- Men-at-Arms (1977–2007) series
- Elite series
- General Military series
- Warrior series
- Campaign series

For Iron Crown Enterprises:

- Middle-earth Role Playing
- Rolemaster
- Middle-earth Collectible Card Game

For Ladybird Horror Classics Series:

- Dracula (1984)
- The Mummy (1985)
