= Janet Aulisio =

American illustrator

- Obsidiman Merchant, 1992
- Born: Hackensack, New Jersey
- Known for: Fantasy and sf art
- Awards: Chesley Award, 1988

Janet Elizabeth Aulisio-Dannheiser is an artist whose work has appeared in role-playing games. From 1981 to 1995, she created the cover artwork for 24 books and magazines, and during the same period, her interior work appeared in over 100 publications.

== Career ==
Aulisio was born in Hackensack, New Jersey. She attended Hackensack High School, where she was one of the winners of the annual New Jersey Fine Arts Scholarship Awards.

Her work has primarily appeared in publications for FASA, Game Designers' Workshop and White Wolf Publishing – she is especially known for her work on Shadowrun and Earthdawn books – but she has also illustrated cards for Magic: The Gathering, On the Edge and BattleTech TCG, created several covers for Analog Science Fiction/Science Fact and Amazing Stories. and illustrated nine novels.

== Reception ==
Writing for Black Gate, Scott Taylor commented on her work for Shadowrun, saying, "Her work on Shadowrun's 2nd Edition defined the system's reboot, and her color work gives an almost rhythmic club feel to any interaction within the pages. She creates characters, storylines, and a feeling of heat and shade that whispers of sex, drugs, and magic deep in the alleys of a hard-boiled subculture. ... Although Janet was already doing limited work in color, her vibrant acrylics came to life as she explored the apocalyptic pre-history spun in this gaming system. It was here also that one of her most famous works, "Obsidiman Merchant", came into being. With him we see all the emotion and depth Janet wields with her brush, the tiles behind him helping create a vision of detail that is definitive in everything she creates."

In his 2023 book Monsters, Aliens, and Holes in the Ground, RPG historian Stu Horvath reviewed Shadowrun and noted, "Janet Aulisio comes on board for the second edition, providing deep shadows through which to skulk." In his examination of Earth Dawn, Horvath commented, "[Janet] Aulisio, an enigmatic figure who largely vanished from the industry later in the decade, delivers some sublime work for the setting. In previous games, her work is characterized by deep shadows. This is true here, but she also showcases an astounding sense of color and pattern — her portrait of the Obsidiman merchant, in striped pants and patterned textiles, lounging against a mosaic wall, in many ways, sums up the complex visual language of the entire line."

== Awards ==
- Aulisio was nominated for the World Fantasy Award—Artist in 1991.
- In 1988, Aulisio won a Chesley Award in the category "Interior Illustration" for art appearing in the May 1987 issue of Amazing Stories
  - Aulisio was also a finalist for Chesley Awards in four consecutive years, 1988–1991
- In a 1989 Analog readers' poll of best artist of the year, Aulisio placed 4th for Hunting Rights which appeared on the cover of the May 1988 issue.
- In 1990 and again in 1991, Aulisio was the winner of the Asimov's Reader Award for Best Artwork. She was nominated a further eight times between 1988 and 2002.
