= Cyberspace (role-playing game) =

1989 Dystopian near-future role-playing game

- Cover art by Rick Vietch
- Designers: Tod Foley
- Publishers: Iron Crown Enterprises
- Publication: 1989 (1st edition); 1992 (2nd edition)
- Genres: Cyberpunk
- Systems: Spacemaster system

Cyberspace is a near-future cyberpunk role-playing game published by Iron Crown Enterprises (I.C.E.) in 1989 using a revised set of rules from their previously published Space Master role-playing game.

== Description ==
Cyberspace is a role-playing game that uses the cyberpunk atmosphere engendered in the science fiction novels of William Gibson, Bruce Sterling and Walter John Williams. The primary setting is a dystopian urban sprawl around San Francisco in the year 2090 in a world that is controlled by powerful "MegaCorps".

Players choose from a variety of occupations including:

- Jockey, primarily a pilot and of almost any aircraft or vehicle, also jack-of-all-trades
- Killer, a combat specialist
- Net Junkie or Net Head, a computer hacker
- Sleaze, a specialist in social skills
- Sneak, a physical security specialist
- Tech Rat, technical wizard

== Publication history ==
In 1985, I.C.E. published the complex science-fiction role-playing game Space Master and subsequently released several adventures for it. Tod Foley, who worked on some of the adventures, developed a cyberpunk science fiction role-playing game with the help of Terry Amthor, Kevin Barrett, Coleman Charlton, and Leo LaDell. The game, Cyberspace, set in a grim and morally bankrupt future, was published as a 208-page softcover book in 1989 with cover art by Rick Vietch and interior art by Angela Bostick, Dell Harris, Rick Lowry, and Karl Martin.

I.C.E. published several adventures and supplements for the game in 1990 and 1991, and published a second edition of the game in 1992.

== Reception ==
In Issue 55 of the French games magazine Casus Belli, Pierre Rosenthal thought that Cyberspace "is an almost exact copy of [the previously published R. Talsorian Games product] Cyberpunk. Indeed, although the setting has to be similar and commonalities would be expected, certain aspects (background of the characters, presentation of the interface worlds, corporation files) seem almost plagiarized." Rosenthal did find that each chapter of this game "(history, cybernetic implants, computer interface, vehicles, corporations) is a little more in-depth [than other products]." But Rosenthal thought descriptions of computer systems were forty years out of date, calling "the vision of computing worthy of the 1950s." Rosenthal also pointed out that this game, like other American cyberpunk role-playing games, was extremely America-oriented, noting that "Europe is limited to England and a few satellite Latin countries (like Italy, Spain and France)." Rosenthal concluded, "Cyberspace remains a good alternative for those who like the I.C.E. simulation system."

In his 1990 book The Complete Guide to Role-Playing Games, game critic Rick Swan called it an "excellent cyberpunk RPG" but he had reservations about recommending it, pointing out that, like its complex predecessor Space Master, this game's rulebook was "packed with tables, numbers, and formulas. Cyberspace is clearly intended for sophisticated players who don't mind thumbing through a thick rulebook to dig out the string of modifiers necessary to resolve combat or create characters." But Swan did think that the game "features the most thoroughly developed background of any cyberpunk RPG ... Computer technology receives the best treatment I've ever seen in an RPG." Swan concluded by giving the game a rating of 3 out of 4, writing, "As a game, Cyberspace is playable for those determined enough to untangle the rules. As a sourcebook, it's an essential purchase for anyone planning a cyberpunk campaign, regardless of the game system they're using."

Stephan Wieck reviewed Cyberspace in White Wolf #21 (June/July 1990), rating it a 3 out of 5 and stated that "If complicated mechanics don't bother you, Cyberspace is the best purely cyberpunk game for you, and even if you're happy with another cyberpunk RPG, Cyberspace is worth its cover price just for its source material."

In a 1996 reader poll to determine the 50 most popular roleplaying games conducted by the British games magazine Arcane, Cyberspace was ranked 44th. The magazine's editor Paul Pettengale commented: "One of the most detailed cyberpunk rules systems, what really sets Cyberspace apart is its cybertechnology. Rather than presenting a shopping list of things your character could have implanted in his or her anatomy, Cyberspace includes full rules for designing customised cyberware. By connecting sub-systems to 3 different inputs, outputs, activation controls and power sources, players can create their own systems."
