= Rick Britton =

American historian

Richard H. "Rick" Britton is an American historian and former game publishing executive in Charlottesville, Virginia.

== Career ==
In 1980, after graduating from the University of Virginia, Britton and nine fellow alums founded Iron Crown Enterprises (ICE), a publisher of roleplaying games. Britton ran the company for two years while Pete Fenlon commuted from law school. Britton's wargame Manassas was set in the company's home state of Virginia during the American Civil War. Britton served as vice-president in charge of operations.

While most of the games produced by the company were set in fantasy worlds — such as Britton's fantasy board wargame Cleric's Revenge, the company also published Britton's 1980 American Civil War wargame Manassas, which reenacts the eponymous battle.

By 1992, Britton had left ICE, and has since written books about local history. He is a former board director of the Albemarle Charlottesville Historical Society and former editor of The Magazine of Albemarle County History. He guides tours of Virginia historical sites, including Civil War battlefields and Jefferson's architectural masterpieces, Monticello and the University of Virginia. He also frequently speaks about local history on WINA, a Charlottesville radio station.

Britton's collection of essays, Jefferson, A Monticello Sampler, published by Mariner Publishing, won the 2009 "IPPY" Award in National and Regional Book Competition.

He is also a cartographer, photographer, and book illustrator.

== Works ==
- Jefferson: A Monticello Sampler. Buena Vista, Virginia: Mariner Publishing, 2009.
- Albemarle & Charlottesville: An Illustrated History of the First 150 Years. Charlottesville, Virginia: Historical Publishing Network, 2006.
- The Sea of Trolls with Nancy Farmer, maps by Rick Britton. New York: Atheneum Books, 2004.
- On the Downtown Mall with Gary D. Kessler, Stacey Evans (photographer), and Rick Britton (photographer). Piscataway, New Jersey: Gorgias Press, 2002.

== Awards ==
- The Thirteenth Annual (2009) IPPY Independent Publisher Book Awards (the Jenkins Group).
