= Iron Crown Enterprises =

American game publishing company

- ICE's "Classic" logo
- Industry: Gaming
- Founded: 1980
- Successor: Aurigas Aldebaron LLC, Guild Companion Publications
- Key people: Pete Fenlon, S. Coleman Charlton, Bruce Neidlinger, Rick Britton, Terry K. Amthor
- Products: Middle-earth Role Playing, Rolemaster, High Adventure Role Playing (HARP), HARP SF, HARP SF Xtreme, Shadow World, Space Master

Iron Crown Enterprises (ICE) is an American publishing company that has produced role playing, board, miniature, and collectible card games since 1980. Many of ICE's better-known products were related to J. R. R. Tolkien's world of Middle-earth, but the Rolemaster rules system, and its science-fiction equivalent, Space Master, have been the foundation of ICE's business.

== History ==
=== Early years and Rolemaster ===
Pete Fenlon was running a six-year Dungeons & Dragons campaign set in Middle-earth while he was attending college in the late 1970s, when he started developing unique house rules with S. Coleman Charlton and Kurt Fischer. After graduating from the University of Virginia in 1980, they wanted to make a business out of their special game rules, so they founded Iron Crown Enterprises (ICE), named after a regalia from Middle-earth. Aside from Fenlon and Charlton, ICE originally included Richard H. Britton, Terry K. Amthor, Bruce Shelley, Bruce Neidlinger, Kurt Fischer, Heike Kubasch, and Olivia Johnston, amongst others. The company originally only had a few full-time staff, relying on volunteer work from the other founders until income increased and they could be brought on as employees.

ICE soon published its first three game products: Arms Law (1980), The Iron Wind (1980), and Manassas (1981). Arms Law was the first release including the house rules from the University of Virginia days, which began Rolemaster as an alternate system for combat in AD&D rather than a standalone role-playing game. The Iron Wind was a campaign for any fantasy role-playing game taking place on a fantastic island, and although it did not receive supplements, for years it would come to be considered the first release from ICE in their Loremaster campaign setting. Manassas, by Rick Britton, was a wargame set during the American Civil War in the ICE home state of Virginia.

ICE's series of rules supplements, beginning with Arms Law, were intended to serve as modular add-ons to other RPG systems offering greater detail. Arms Law was followed by Spell Law (1982), Character Law (1982), and Campaign Law (1984). In time, these supplements were tied together to form an RPG system of their own, Rolemaster. Concurrent with the rules supplements, ICE began releasing world campaign content materials in what was originally called the Loremaster series, beginning with The Iron Wind.

=== Middle-earth RPG line and expansion ===
Rolemaster had originated from a game set in Middle-earth, so ICE sought a license from Tolkien Enterprises to The Hobbit and The Lord of the Rings, which was granted because nobody had ever asked them for such a license before. Tolkien Enterprises granted an exclusive, worldwide license to ICE in 1982, and ICE began the Middle-earth line by publishing the sourcebook A Campaign and Adventure Guidebook for Middle-earth (1982) which could be used with any fantasy role-playing game. According to some estimates, at the time of its publication ICE's Middle-earth Role Playing was the second best selling fantasy RPG after TSR's Dungeons & Dragons.

ICE then added the science fiction RPGs Spacemaster (1985) and Cyberspace (1989) to its line. ICE also published a moderately successful space miniatures battle game called Silent Death (1990), based on Spacemaster but with simpler mechanics. Silent Death was released in two major editions, with supplemental books and a fair number of paintable lead miniatures. ICE also expanded its original Loremaster supplements into a full-blown fantasy world to support Rolemaster, called the Shadow World, supported by dozens of adventures and sourcebooks. In 1986, ICE signed a publication contract to take over Hero Games' production and distribution. Later, with Hero Games staff leaving for other jobs, ICE took over the creative reins of Hero's products.

Iron Crown branched out into the solo gaming books under the Tolkien Quest (later called Middle-earth Quest, 1985), Sherlock Holmes Solo Mysteries (1987) and Narnia Solo Games (1988) book lines. Unknown to ICE at the time, the Middle-earth Quest books violated ICE and Tolkien Enterprises' contract with Tolkien's book publishing licensee, George Allen & Unwin. ICE and TE considered the books to be games and under their license, but the format came too close to being literary books. ICE was forced to recall and destroy the whole line of books, at devastating cost. Meanwhile, ICE sued the Narnia licensor as they turned out to not have the necessary rights to license Narnia to ICE. That company went bankrupt from the legal settlement and was unable to pay ICE their damages. ICE reached terms in 1988 for a gamebook license with the estate of J.R.R. Tolkien and George Allen & Unwin for four new Middle-earth Quest books, beginning with A Spy in Isengard. However, the solo game book market was going soft by this time. ICE canceled all solo game book lines, with dozens of books still in development. Returns were high on the Sherlock Holmes Solo Mysteries line. All this brought ICE to near bankruptcy in a "voluntary-type of receivership".

==== Reception ====
Writing in 1984, game critic Eric Olson gave positive reviews to both the Rolemaster line of products — cautioning that they might be hard to adapt to an existing campaign since their approach was so different to most game systems — and the MERP line. Olson concluded, "ICE is on the rise, and has built a solid base, and I am more and more impressed with them with each new product."

=== Middle-earth CCG ===
With the rise of collectible card games, ICE released Middle-earth Collectible Card Game (1995) and Warlords CCG (1997). In 1997, ICE bailed out Mayfair Games, a publisher well known for the Settlers of Catan board game.

=== Demise ===
In 1997, ICE suffered financial difficulties from a rapid decline in its distribution net; nearly 70% of ICE's distributors either went bankrupt or became moribund. By 2000, the company was in deep financial trouble, and filed for Chapter 7 bankruptcy in October 2000. This cost ICE the Middle-earth license, ending both the MERP and MECCG lines. Many of the authors and illustrators were not paid for substantial amounts of work.

=== Aurigas Aldebaron ===
ICE's logo since relaunch

In December, 2001, ICE's assets were purchased by Aurigas Aldebaron LLLC, an intellectual property ownership company. The new owners licensed the Iron Crown Enterprise name and other assets to Mjolnir LLC until 2011. Starting in January, 2011, licensing was transferred to Guild Companion Publications Ltd.

In 2016, Aurigas Alderbaron merged with Guild Companion Publications Ltd to create a single company: Guild Companion Publications. This company both holds the Iron Crown Enterprises intellectual property and produces and sells Iron Crown products.

On January 9, 2017, Guild Companion Publications Limited officially changed its name to Iron Crown Enterprises Ltd.

=== Iron Crown Enterprises Ltd ===
Iron Crown Enterprises continues to produce products for its Rolemaster and High Adventure Role Playing (HARP) line, including products set in the Shadow World.

== Selected publications ==
=== Board games ===
- Manassas (1980)
- The Riddle of the Ring (1982)
- The Fellowship of the Ring (1983)
- The Battle of Five Armies (1984)
- The Lonely Mountain - Lair of Smaug the Dragon (1984)
- Cleric's Revenge (1985)
- Star Strike (1988)
- Armored Assault (1989)
- The Hobbit Adventure (1994)

=== Solo gaming books ===
- Tolkien Quest/Middle-earth Quest line
  - Night of the Nazgûl (1985)
  - The Legend of Weathertop (1985)
  - Rescue in Mirkwood (1986)
  - Murder at Minas Tirith (unpublished)
  - A Spy in Isengard (1988)
  - Treason at Helm's Deep (1988)
  - The Mines of Moria (1988)
  - Search for the Palantir (1989)
- Sherlock Holmes Solo Mysteries line
  - Murder at the Diogenes Club (1987)
  - The Black River Emerald (1987)
  - Death at Appledore Towers (1987)
  - The Crown vs. Dr. Watson (1988)
  - The Dynamiters (1988)
  - The Royal Flush (1988)
  - Honor of the Yorkshire Light Artillery (1988)
- Narnia Solo Games line
  - Return to Deathwater (1988)
  - Leap of the Lion (1988)
  - The Lost Crowns of Cair Paravel (1988)
  - Return of the White Witch (1988)
  - The Sorceress and the Book of Spells (1988)

=== Role-playing games ===
- The Iron Wind (1981)
- A Campaign and Adventure Guidebook for Middle-earth (1982)
- Angmar: Land of the Witch King (1982) - sourcebook
- Umbar: Haven of the Corsairs (1982)
- Ardor in Southern Middle-earth (1983)
- Isengard and Northern Gondor (1983)
- Northern Mirkwood: The Wood-Elves Realm (1983)
- Southern Mirkwood: Haunt of the Necromancer (1983)
- Middle-earth Role Playing (1984)
  - Bree and the Barrow-Downs (1984)
  - Dagorlad and the Dead Marshes (1984)
  - Hillmen of the Trollshaws (1984)
  - Middle-earth Role Playing Combat Screen (1984)
  - Moria: The Dwarven City (1984)
  - The Tower of Cirith Ungol and Shelob's Lair (1984)
  - Erech and the Paths of the Dead (1985)
  - Haunted Ruins of the Dunlendings (1985)
  - Rangers of the North: The Kingdom of Arthedain (1985)
  - Lords of Middle-earth, Volume I (1986)
  - Lórien & The Halls of the Elven Smiths (1986)
  - Trolls of the Misty Mountains (1986)
  - Dunland and the Southern Misty Mountains (1987)
  - Ents of Fangorn (1987)
  - Lords of Middle-earth, Volume II (1987)
  - Creatures of Middle-earth (1988)
  - Minas Tirith (1988)
  - Angus McBride's Characters of Middle-earth (1990)
  - Ghost Warriors (1990)
  - Gorgoroth (1990)
  - Minas Ithil (1991)
  - Palantir Quest (1994)
  - Kin-Strife (1995)
  - Hands of the Healer (1997)
- Rolemaster - A role playing game system.
  - Arms Law (1980)
  - Spell Law (1981)
  - Character Law (1982)
  - Claw Law (1982)
  - War Law (1991)
  - Sea Law (1994)
  - Rolemaster (1982)
  - Campaign Law (1984)
  - Creatures & Treasures (1985)
  - Rolemaster, second edition (1986)
  - Rolemaster Companion (1986)
  - Rolemaster second edition 2nd iteration (1989)
  - Elemental Companion (1989)
  - Shadow World Master Atlas (1989)
  - Outlaw - a historical setting source book for Rolemaster (1991)
  - At Rapier's Point - a historical setting source book for Rolemaster (1993)
  - Oriental Companion - a historical setting source book for Rolemaster (1993)
  - Shadow World: The Cloudlords of Tanara (1982, 2013)
  - Shadow World Master Atlas (4th Edition) (2003, 2011)
  - Shadow World Master Atlas (3rd Edition) (2001, 2011)
  - Shadow World powers of Light and Darkness (2003, 2011)
  - Demons of the Burning Night (1989, 2011)
  - Islands of the Oracle (1989, 2011)
  - Kingdom of the Desert Jewel (1989, 2011)
  - Journey to the Magic Isle (1989)
  - Quellbourne: Land of the Silver Mist (1989, 2011)
  - Tales of the Loremasters (1989)
  - Tales of the Loremasters II (1989)
  - Shadow World: Haalkitaine & The Court of Rhakhaan (2019)
  - Shadow World: Jaiman : Land of Twilight (2018)
  - Shadow World: Eidolon: City in the Sky (2015)
  - Shadow World: Tales from the Green Gryphon Inn (2015)
  - Shadow World: Emer III (2014)
  - Rolemaster Unified: Core Law (2022)
  - Rolemaster Unified: Spell Law (2023)
- Spacemaster - An adaption of Rolemaster system in a sci-fi setting. First edition (1985), second edition (1988)
  - Future Law (1985)
  - Tech Law (1985)
  - Action On Akaisha Outstation (1985)
  - Imperial Crisis (1985)
  - Spacemaster Companion (1986)
  - Lost Telepaths (1986)
  - Beyond The Core (1987)
  - The Cygnus Conspiracy (1987)
  - Tales From Deep Space (1988)
  - War on a Distant Moon (1988)
  - The Durandrium Find (1989)
  - Disaster on Adanis III (1989)
  - Raiders from the Frontier (1989)
  - Spacemaster Companion I (1990)
  - Dark Space (1990)
  - Aliens & Artifacts (1991)
  - Time Riders (1992)
  - Spacemaster Companion II (1994)
- Cyberspace (1989)
  - Cyberspace Core Rulebook (1989)
  - Sprawlgangs & Megacorps (1990)
  - Edge-On (1990)
  - CyberRogues (1990)
  - The Body Bank (1990)
  - Death Valley Free Prison (1990)
  - Death Game 2090 (1990)
  - Cyberskelter (1991)
  - Chicago Arcology (1991)
  - Cyber Europe (1991, 2015)
- Campaign Classics line - dual statted for Hero System and Rolemaster:
  - Robin Hood the Role Playing Campaign (1987)
  - Mythic Greece (1988)
  - Vikings (1989)
  - Pirates (1989)
  - Mythic Egypt (1990)
  - Arabian Nights (1994) - a "Rolemaster Genre Book" without Hero System stats
- Lord of the Rings Adventure Game (1991)
- High Adventure Role Playing (2003, 2004, 2011)
  - HARP College of Magics (2004, 2013)
  - HARP Martial Law (2003, 2004, 2013)
  - HARP Loot (2016)
  - HARP Folkways (2017)
  - HARP A Wedding in Axebridge (2017)
  - HARP Bestiary (2021)
  - HARP Garden of Rain (2021)
  - HARP Beyond the Veil (2022)
  - HARP Subterfuge (2022)

=== Miniatures games ===
- Silent Death (1990)
- Bladestorm (1990)

=== Collectible card games ===
- Middle-earth Collectible Card Game (1995)
- Warlords Collectible Card Game (1997)

=== Collectible dice game ===
- Dicemaster: Cities of Doom (1996)
