= Coleman Charlton =

American role-plating game designer

S. Coleman Charlton
- Born: Richmond, Virginia
- Education: PhD of Computer Science from the University of Virginia
- Occupations: Director of Development and Production
- Years active: 1980–present
- Employer: Mayfair Games
- Known for: Iron Crown Enterprises (Co-Founder)
- Notable work: Rolemaster
- Awards: 1984 Charles S. Roberts Award for Best Fantasy Board Game; 1995 Origins Award for Best Card Game

S. Coleman Charlton was one of the founders of Iron Crown Enterprises (ICE).

== Career ==
While running a six-year Dungeons & Dragons campaign set in Middle-earth, Pete Fenlon began developing a set of house rules with Charlton and Kurt Fischer, ultimately forming Iron Crown Enterprises in 1980 to publish their set of rules. Charlton was one of the designers of the Rolemaster role-playing game system in 1980. In 1984 he simplified the Rolemaster set of rules in order to create MERP, the first Middle-earth role-playing game, also edited by ICE.

Charlton designed the Middle-earth Collectible Card Game, which was published in 1995, after ICE recovered the licensing rights that they had previously signed over to Wizards of the Coast. Charlton and Fenlon later oversaw Mayfair Games.

== See also ==
- Iron Crown Enterprises
- Mayfair Games
- The Settlers of Catan
