= Shadow World (role-playing game) =

Tabletop role-playing game setting

- Cover of The Iron Wind, the first book to be set in Shadow World
- Designers: Terry K. Amthor
- Publishers: Eidolon Studio, Iron Crown Enterprises, Guild Companion Publications
- Publication: 1987–current
- Genres: Fantasy/Science Fiction
- Languages: English
- Media type: Game accessories, novels, role-playing games,

Shadow World is a high fantasy campaign setting situated on the fictional planet of Kulthea. Originally produced for the Rolemaster role-playing game system, Shadow World is fairly compatible with other d100 games such as High Adventure Role Playing (HARP), Middle-earth Role Playing (MERP) or Against the Darkmaster. The setting blends traditional fantasy elements, such as elves, dwarves, and magic, with science fiction, including such elements as space and time travel, and, to a degree, futuristic technology.

As with Rolemaster and HARP, Shadow World is owned by Iron Crown Enterprises (often referred to as I.C.E.). It was maintained by the primary author of the setting, Terry K. Amthor of Eidolon Studio (who also holds the trademark for Shadow World, and copyrights for non-gaming fiction related to the world), until his death.

== Themes ==
Shadow World is a fantasy and science fiction environment that deals with a number of topics, including the path of the hero, in a fantasy role-playing environment.

== Development history ==
The Shadow World logo

The first book to be set in Shadow World was The Iron Wind adventure setting, published in 1980 as a game setting for Iron Crown Enterprises's Rolemaster fantasy game system. Iron Crown also published Vog Mur and The Cloudlords of Tanara as standalone settings before the 1989 publication of the Shadow World World Atlas First Edition placed those settings in the context of a single overarching campaign. Iron Crown went on to publish several more supplements before the rights to the property reverted to author Terry Amthor. Many of the first edition Shadow World supplements, have been republished as second editions, updated and suitable for the Rolemaster Standard System (RMSS) from 1994 and the Rolemaster Classic game system from 2007.

== The world ==
The focus of the Shadow World setting is the Western Hemisphere of the planet Kulthea. A massive techno-magickal barrier effectively prevents crossing into the Eastern Hemisphere. The lands of Kulthea are ruled variously by different strains of humans, elves, Lugrok, Murlog, and other fantastic creatures and peoples. Kulthean cultures vary in their technological development from the early stone-age to Steampunk fantasy interpretations of the Italian Renaissance or the Edwardian Era. The presence of magic is a boon and a bane, permitting feats not accomplishable by comparable earth-age cultures, but retarding overall technological development that lack the understanding of melding science and technology held in Kulthea's ancient history. Trade is performed by water and air-going ships or on horse-drawn vehicles, all of which must be aided by a guild of Navigators who can show paths that circumvent magical, weather and other hazards left over from ancient wars and malfunctioning technology.

== The universe ==
Shadow World dovetails into Iron Crown's Terran Imperium, a science fiction scenario based on Frank Herbert's Dune intended for their Spacemaster game.

A handful of light years from Earth, Kulthea is the seventh planet (of 13) in its solar system, with a solar orbit of 350 days.

Five moons orbit Kulthea. Orhan is the largest (it can be seen in full daylight) and circles Kulthea in 70 days. This moon is very important to peoples and cultures of Kulthea, and is home to the Lords of Orhan. Many calendrical systems are based on Orhan's movement through the sky. Varin is the second largest moon, and is orange in color. With its polar orbit and red color, Charon, the third moon and home to the Dark Gods, is greatly feared. The waxing of Charon, as well as the time when it reaches its zenith, are considered by many cultures to be a period of ill omen. Also, conjunctions of Charon and Orhan can disturb Essænce Flows on Kulthea (see below), causing havoc to the planet's weather and general climatic stability. Mikori is the final moon that orbits Kulthea while Tlilok, counted among the five Kulthean moons, is technically a satellite of Orhan.

== Geography ==
Most of the published material for Kulthea documents the planet's western Hemisphere. Dominated by water, the hemisphere consists of several large continents, including Jaiman, Emer, Agyra, Falias, Folenn, Thuul, and others. Two of the most heavily documented continents thus far are Emer and Jaiman. There are also several subterranean locations described. In addition to the continents are many archipelagos, the fractured geology intended to suggest the geologically unstable history of the planet.

Various products detailing specific areas of Kulthea, ranging from high-levels of entire continents (Jaiman: Land of Twilight or Emer: The Great Continent), to collections of specific adventures (Tales of the Loremasters).

== Races ==
Shadow World broadly categorizes races into the mortal (or "mannish," though this category includes species such as dwarves and centaurs), immortal (or "Elven") species, and "Half-elven" species. The "half-elven" are not necessarily the direct offspring of a human and an elven parent, but rather long-lived the intermixed hybrid population resulting from widespread interbreeding of human and elven populations until speciation occurs, for example the Sulini or Ky'tari. Compared to mortals, either sort of half-elf has a long life, though for species it is measured in centuries while for individuals such as Elor Once Dark or T'vaar Dekdarion it is measurable in millennia.

Human subspecies are categorizable as roughly descended from extinct species such as the Jinteni, a few varieties of "High Men" borrowing heavily from J. R. R. Tolkien's Dúnedain (e.g. Zori or Laan) and many categories of "common men" (such as Jameri or Haid). Shadow World's "High Men" differ from the Dúnedain both in higher racial diversity among the former (e.g. the Kinsai are dark-skinned), and there is no suggestion in the source material that High Men or their antecedents owe their longer lives to a very distant elven ancestor.

There are also so-called "evil" or monstrous races such as the Murlogi (goblins) and Lugroki (Orcs), with speculated origins as the results of alien origin or sorcerous manipulation.

== Religion and gods ==
Religions play an active role in the Shadow World, with various gods taking active roles in the unfolding of the storyline directly and indirectly. The deities of Kulthea are divided into several categories

- The Lords of Orhan, considered unambiguously good by most human and elven societies.
- The Unlife, identified in the authorial voice as unambiguously evil.
- The Dark Gods of Charon, ranging from ethically complex to outright evil in how human and elven cultures view them.
- Local Gods, animistic embodiments of places with immense power over that geographically limited region (Though the spheres of influence for some local gods, such as Mynistra, can be quite large).
- Other Entitites, such as demons, spirits, dragons, etc., that can convince a population that they are worthy of worship.

Religious organizations on Kulthea are dedicated to one or more of these gods, as understood through the filter of their priests and lay worshipers, giving rise to the potential for dispute between different groups worshiping the same god. Religious groups dedicated to the Dark Gods of Charon are usually, but not always, forced by social pressure to hide their places of worship.

== History ==
The history of Kulthea is a convoluted and violent one characterized by the cyclical rising and destruction of countless races, kingdoms, and empires. Local wars are common as competing polities vie with one another for resources, people, tribute, or ideological reasons. Vast global conflicts have been fought between the powers of Light and Darkness, and each one has marked the transition from one Era to the next. These wars have nearly destroyed the planet, laying waste to entire continents and leading to millennia of cultural and political stagnation. Kulthea's history is divided into three eras.

The "current date" of the campaign (i.e., the date to which recently published material refers) is 6054 of the Third Era. This date has changed, as early versions of the Master Atlas and supplementary materials dated to T.E. 6050. The more recent versions of the Atlas add material to the overall chronology up through T.E. 6054.

=== First Era ===
The First Era concerns the history of the Althan race, ruled by the rise of the K'ta'viiri (the "Lords of Essaence" [sic]). Details regarding this age have been left deliberately vague, with allusions to a galaxy-spanning empire's rise, corruption, and catastrophic fall. During this time, the ancestors of most of the current inhabitants of Shadow World were brought to there by the Lords of Essaence.

=== Interregnum ===
In between the first and Second, there lies a 100,000-year-long period of recovery and regrowth, also known as the Long Night. Again, the authors have left details of this time period vague, noting only the rise and fall of several empires such as the "Jinteni" and "Wôrim." in southern Emer and Gaalt, respectively, who war constantly with the elven realms of the distant east. Both succumb to famine, disease, and natural disasters (as well as warfare) and disappear approximately 5,000 years before the beginning of the Second Era.

=== Second Era ===
The Second Age of Ire begins with the founding of the College of Loremasters on the secret isle of Karilôn by Kirin T'thaan, Ilmaris Terisonen, and Andraax, (See Signature Characters). The Loremasters gather knowledge and disseminate it to advance civilization. They create a reliable calendar based on the phases of the moon Orhan. Using "Loremaster reckoning," history is more accurately recorded than had been the case in the Long Night.

The Age is characterized by the rise of many polities, attainment of golden ages, and subsequent corruption and destruction by the Unlife, culminating in a "War of Dominion" in which the forces of the Unlife gather all their strength and are defeated by the forces of "civilization," though once again at catastrophic price.

=== Third Era ===
The Third Era of Ire, which includes the game's present time, begins with the recovery of civilizations from the depredations of the Unlife during the War of Dominion; followed by the stealthy workings of evil forces seeking to destroy them again through subtle means.

== Signature characters ==
The setting is the home of several iconic characters:

- Andraax, principal founder of the College of Loremasters
- Randæ Terisonen, a Loremaster with more of a heroic streak than is generally approved of by their fellow Loremasters.
- Elor Once Dark, a Loremaster who succumbed to the temptations of Unlife and subsequently redeemed himself.
- Lorgalis the White, Warlord of Ulor bent on conquering the world.

== Reception ==
In his 1990 book The Complete Guide to Role-Playing Games, game critic Rick Swan gave this game a rating of 3 out of 4, saying, "As with any generic setting, the referee will have to do a fair amount of preparation to incorporate the material into an ongoing campaign, and the lack of scenarios means he'll also have to put together an adventure from scratch."

== Novels ==
Shadow World novels include:

- The Burning Goddess by "Ian Hammell" (Clayton Emery)
- Clock Strikes Sword by "Ian Hammell" (Stephen Bilias)
- City of Assassins by "Ian Hammell" (Clayton Emery)
- Loremaster Legacy (2013) by Terry K. Amthor
- StormRiders (1990) by Roxanne Longstreet
