= Pete Fenlon =

American role playing game designer

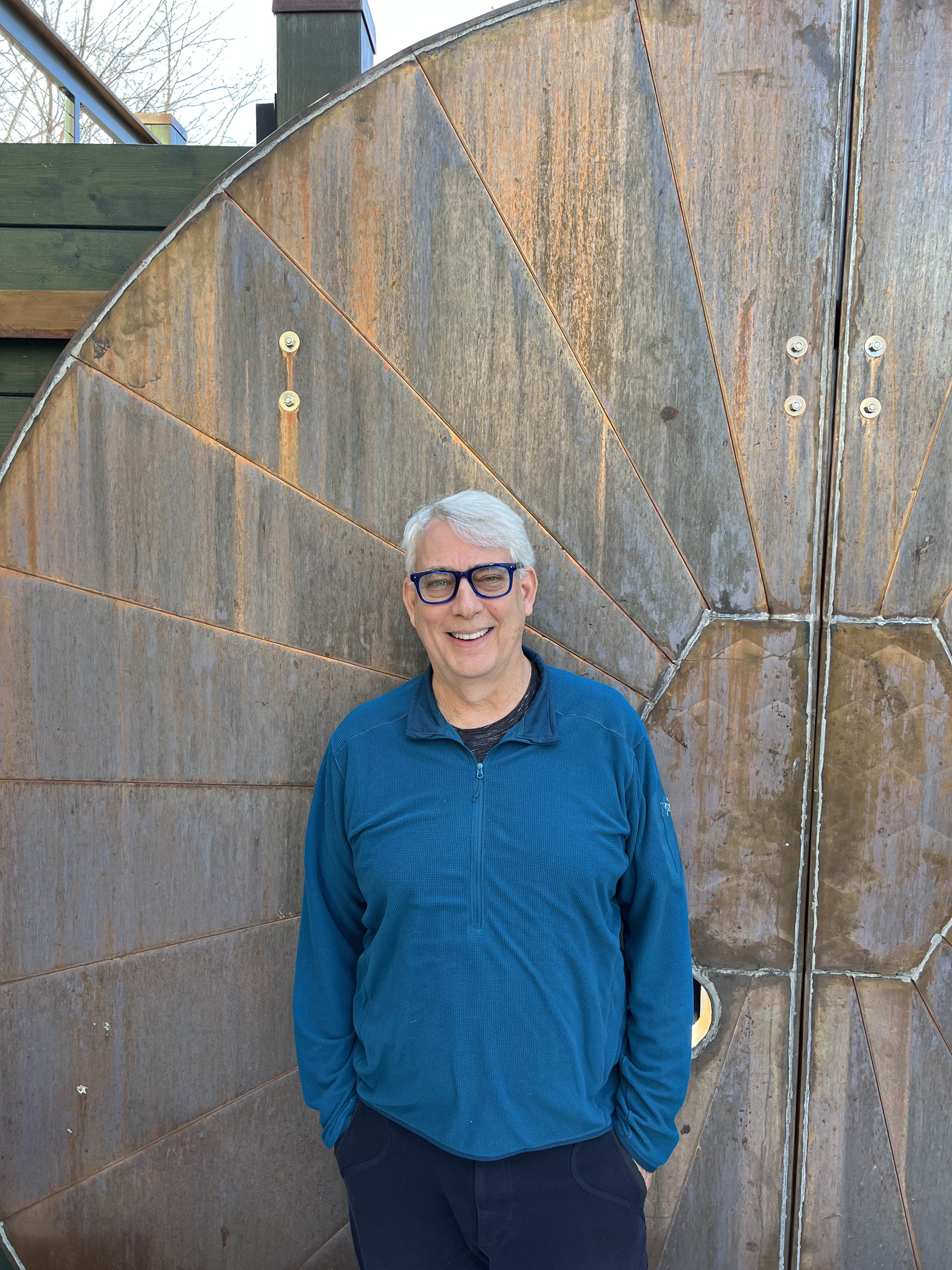
Pete Fenlon in 2022

Pete Fenlon (born 1955) is an American role-playing game cartographer, game designer, game developer, graphics designer and publisher. His works include stories, art and games (electronic and non) in the genres of science fiction, mystery, fantasy and historical fiction.

== Early life ==
He was born in Japan to an Air Force Colonel (Peter C. Fenlon) and Captain (Melba S. Fenlon, RN). He also lived in Germany and the US before settling in Charlottesville, Virginia. He is a graduate of Thomas Jefferson High School (1964–1987), where he served as executive officer of the Simulations Club. Fenlon began playing Dungeons & Dragons when it was introduced in 1974. After obtaining a degree in history and anthropology at the University of Virginia, he earned a Juris Doctor degree at the College of William & Mary Law School and passed the Virginia State Bar exam.

== Career ==
He began his career by creating custom fantasy role playing game rules and drawing detailed, full-color Middle-earth maps after passing the Bar exam. He has created and published games and fiction since 1980.

Fenlon began playing Dungeons & Dragons when it was introduced in 1974, and Fenlon, S. Coleman Charlton and Kurt Fischer were developing house rules for their six-year campaign set in Middle-earth, starting Iron Crown Enterprises in 1980 to make a business with their unique rules. Fenlon's first Middle-earth map was printed in A Campaign and Adventure Guidebook for Middle-earth in 1982, and his maps continued to appear in ICE's Middle-earth Role Playing supplements for about 15 years. He also worked on ICE's Rolemaster and Shadow World games. Fenlon announced in October 2000 that Iron Crown Enterprises had entered chapter 7 bankruptcy.

In 2000–01, Fenlon became involved in development of alternate reality game The Beast, for which he served as Content Lead and Producer. Together with Jordan Weisman, Sean Stewart, and Elan Lee, he was one of The Beast's four "Puppetmasters" and awarded a Peabody Award for Transmedia Storytelling on March 24, 2022.

In 2007, Fenlon was appointed CEO of Mayfair Games, the worldwide English-language publisher of Catan (from 1997 until 2015 The Settlers of Catan). In 2016, he became CEO of Catan Studio, Inc., an independent studio with the Asmodee Group (see Asmodée Éditions).

== Personal life ==
In 1982, Fenlon married Olivia Johnston and moved to Charlottesville, Virginia. He has since worked as a game publisher. Fenlon is very active in the Boy Scouts of America, serving as the Council President to the Virginia Headwaters Council from 2018 to 2021.
