= Ludovick Joseph Minde =

Tanzanian Roman Catholic prelate (born 1952)

Right Reverend Ludovick Joseph Minde ALCP/OSS
- Bishop of Moshi
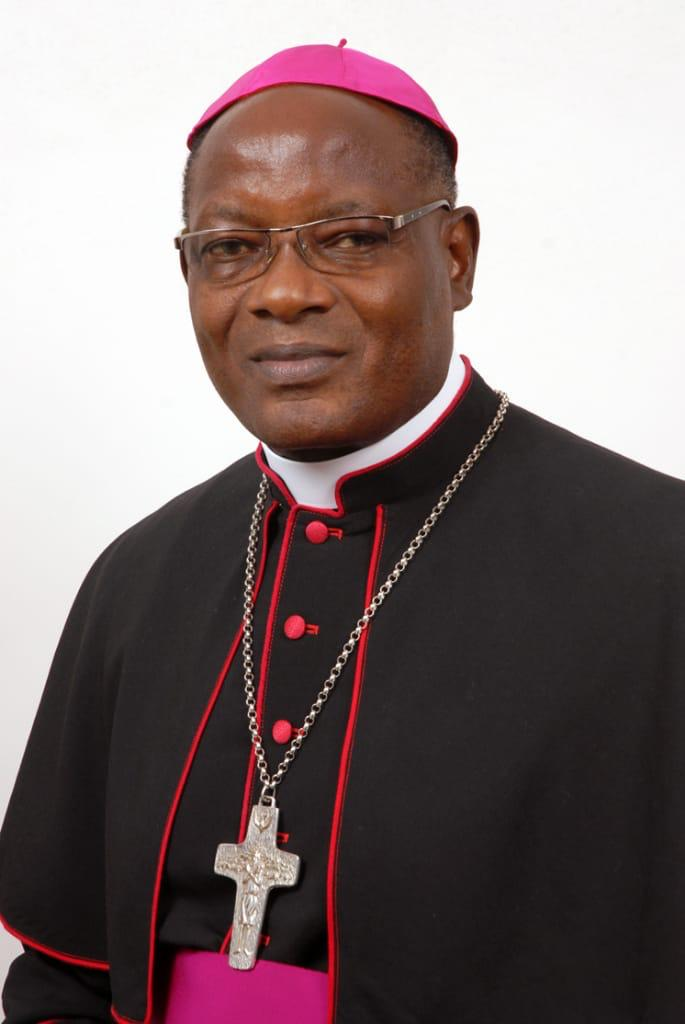
- Bishop Minde in 2024
- Church: Catholic
- Archdiocese: Roman Catholic Archdiocese of Arusha
- Metropolis: Arusha
- Diocese: Moshi
- See: Moshi
- Appointed: 2 December 2019
- Installed: 19 March 2020
- Predecessor: Isaac Amani Massawe
- Other post: Bishop of Kahama (24 April 2001 - 2 December 2019)

Orders
- Ordination: 26 June 1986
- Consecration: 5 August 2001 by Polycarp Cardinal Pengo

Personal details
- Born: Ludovick Joseph Minde; 9 December 1952 (age 73) Kibosho, Moshi, Tanzania
- Denomination: Catholicism
- Education: Pontifical Urban University
- Motto: Veni Sancte Spiritus (Latin for 'Come Holy Spirit')
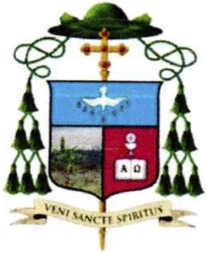
- Coat of arms

Styles of Ludovick Joseph Minde, ALCP/OSS
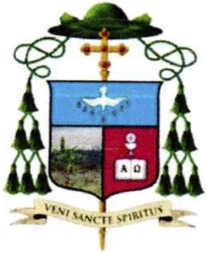
- Reference style: Right Reverend
- Spoken style: Your Grace
- Religious style: Bishop

Ludovick Joseph Minde (born 12 December 1952) is a Tanzanian Catholic prelate who is the Bishop of the Roman Catholic Diocese of Moshi since 2020. Previously, he served as the Bishop of the Roman Catholic Diocese of Kahama, Tanzania from 24 April 2001 until 2 December 2019. He was appointed bishop on 24 April 2001 by Pope John Paul II. He is a member of the Apostolic Life Community of Priests in the Opus Spiritus Sancti (ALCP/OSS).

== Background and education ==
Minde was born on 12 December 1952, in Kibosho, Moshi. He received his primary education at Mweka Primary School. From 1971 until 1977, he attended secondary school, from Form One to Form Six, at St. James Junior Seminary in Moshi, Kilimanjaro Region. He studied Philosophy at Kibosho Major Seminary from 1980 to 1982. He then studied Theology at St. Charles Lwanga Seminary in Segerea from 1982 to 1986.

He was among the five priests sent to Rome for further studies after the Apostolic visit of Pope Saint John Paul II in Tanzania in 1990. From 1990 to 1996, Father Minde pursued studies in Italy, where he earned a Doctorate in Sacred Scripture Theology from the Pontifical Urban University in Rome.

== Priest ==
He was ordained to the Priesthood on 6 June 1986, in the Congregation of the Apostolic Life Community of Priests in the Opus Spiritus Sancti (ALCP/OSS). After his ordination, from 1986 to 1989, he served as a mentor for young men aspiring to join the Congregation.

After completing his studies in 1996, he returned to the country as a Lecturer in Sacred Scripture Theology at St. Charles Lwanga Major Seminary in Segerea, in the Roman Catholic Archdiocese of Dar es Salaam. He served in this role until 2001 when he was appointed Bishop of the Catholic Diocese of Kahama.

== Bishop ==
On 24 April 2001, Pope John Paul II appointed him Bishop of the Catholic Diocese of Kahama, and he was consecrated as Bishop on 5 August 2001, by Polycarp Cardinal Pengo, Archbishop of Dar-es-Salaam assisted by Bishop Matthew Shija, Bishop Emeritus of Kahama and Bishop Amedeus Msarikie, Bishop of Moshi.

On 2 December 2019, Pope Francis appointed him Bishop of the Catholic Diocese of Moshi and apostolic administrator of the Roman Catholic Diocese of Kahama. He ceased being apostolic administrator of Kahama after the appointment and consecration of Bishop Christopher Ndizeye Nkoronko as a new bishop of Kahama in September 2022.

== See also ==
- Roman Catholicism in Tanzania

== Succession table ==
Catholic Church titles
Previous: Matthew Shija (11 November 1983 - 24 April 2001)	Bishop of Kahama; 24 April 2001 - 2 December 2019	Succeeded by Christopher Ndizeye Nkoronko (since 23 June 2022)
Preceded by Isaac Amani Massawe (21 November 2007 - 27 December 2017	Bishop of Moshi (since 2 December 2019	Succeeded by Incumbent
