= Christopher Ndizeye Nkoronko =

Tanzanian Catholic prelate

The Most Reverend Christopher Ndizeye Nkoronko
- Bishop of Kahama
- Church: Catholic Church
- Archdiocese: Roman Catholic Archdiocese of Tabora
- See: Kahama
- Appointed: 23 June 2022
- Installed: 4 September 2022
- Predecessor: Ludovick Joseph Minde
- Successor: Incumbent

Orders
- Ordination: 5 July 2001
- Consecration: 4 September 2022 by Paul Runangaza Ruzoka

Personal details
- Born: Christopher Ndizeye Nkoronko; 25 March 1970 (age 55); Kalinzi, Diocese of Kigoma, Tanzania

Christopher Ndizeye Nkoronko (born 25 March 1970) is a Tanzanian Catholic prelate who is the Bishop of the Roman Catholic Diocese of Kahama, Tanzania. He was appointed bishop of Kahama on 23 June 2022 by Pope Francis.

== Early life and education ==
He was born on 25 March 1970 in Kalinzi, Diocese of Kigoma, Kigoma Region, in Tanzania. He attended primary school in his home area. From 1986 until 1993 he attended Katoke Minor Seminary for his secondary school education. He then studied at Ujiji Minor Seminary from 1993 until 1994, for the one-year preparatory period. He studied philosophy at the Kibosho Major Seminary in Moshi from 1994 until 1996. He then transferred to the Segerea Major Seminary in the Archdiocese of Dar es Salaam where he studied Theology from 1996 until 1999. He served at the Ujiji Minor Seminary for one year from 1999 until 2000. From 2005, he studied at Saint Paul's School of Theology, in Catania, Italy, where he graduated with a Licentiate in Moral theology in 2008.

== Priest ==
He was ordained priest of Kigoma on 5 July 2001. He served as priest until 23 June 2022.

While priest, he served in various roles inside and outside his diocese including as:

- Parish assistant at Kasulu Parish from 2001 until 2004
- Teacher and formator at St. Paul Senior Seminary in Kipalapala from 2004 until 2005
- Collaborator at the Parish of Our Lady of the Blessed Sacrament in Italy from 2005 until 2006
- Assistant at the B.V.M. Assunta Parish in Catania, Italy from 2006 until 2008
- Teacher and formator at St. Paul Senior Seminary in Kipalapala from 2008 until 2011
- Director of the Diocesan Apostolate for the Laity from 2011 until 2012
- Parish priest of Kibondo Parish from 2011 until 2016
- President of the Diocesan Union of Priests (UMAWATA)
- Deputy Director of the Diocesan Apostolate for the Laity from 2012 until 2016
- Undersecretary of the national UMAWATA from 2015 until 2016
- Parish priest of the Cathedral Church, Kigoma from 2016 until 2019
- Diocesan Coordinator of the Tanzania Family Strengthening Program and Courses (UFATA) since 2011
- Diocesan Director of the Pontifical Mission Societies since 2011
- Vicar General of the Diocese of Kigoma since 2016
- Secretary General of the Pastoral Department of the Catholic Diocese of Kigoma, since 2019.

== Bishop ==
On 23 June 2022 the Holy Father appointed him Bishop of the Diocese of Kahama, Tanzania. He was consecrated and installed on 4 September 2022, outside Saint Charles Lwanga Catholic Cathedral, Kahama, in the Diocese of Kahama. The Principal Consecrator was Archbishop Paul Runangaza Ruzoka, Archbishop of Tabora assisted by Bishop Ludovick Joseph Minde, Bishop of Moshi and Bishop Joseph Roman Mlola, Bishop of Kigoma.

== See also ==
- Catholic Church in Tanzania

== Succession table ==
Catholic Church titles
Preceded by Ludovick Joseph Minde (Bishop: 24 April 2001 to 2 December 2019; Apostolic Administrator: 2 December 2019 to 4 September 2022)	Bishop of Kahama (since 23 June 2022)	Succeeded by Incumbent
