= Beatus Christian Urassa =

Tanzanian Catholic prelate

The Most Reverend Beatus Christian Urassa ALCP/OSS
- Bishop of Sumbawanga, Tanzania
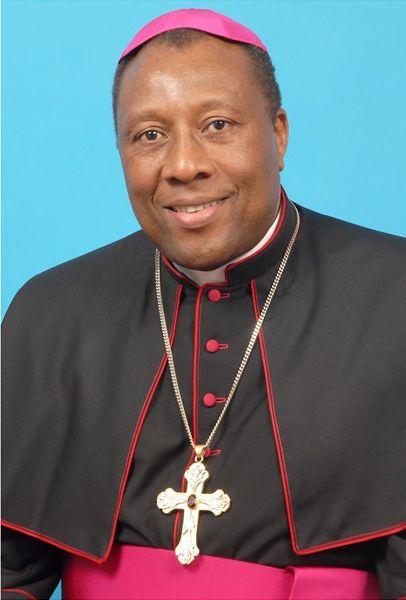
- Right Reverend Beatus Urassa, Bishop of Sumbawanga
- Church: Catholic Church
- Archdiocese: Mbeya
- See: Sumbawanga
- Appointed: 19 April 2018
- Installed: 24 June 2018
- Predecessor: Damian Kyaruzi
- Other post: Provincial Superior ALCP/OSS (2003 - 2015)

Orders
- Ordination: 12 July 1997
- Consecration: 24 June 2018 by Polycarp Cardinal Pengo

Personal details
- Born: Beatus Christian Urassa; 2 August 1965 (age 60) Keni Mashati Village, Rombo District, Kilimanjaro Region, Tanzania
- Motto: Sala, Kazi na Undugu katika Kristo (Swahili for 'Prayer, work and fraternity in Christ')
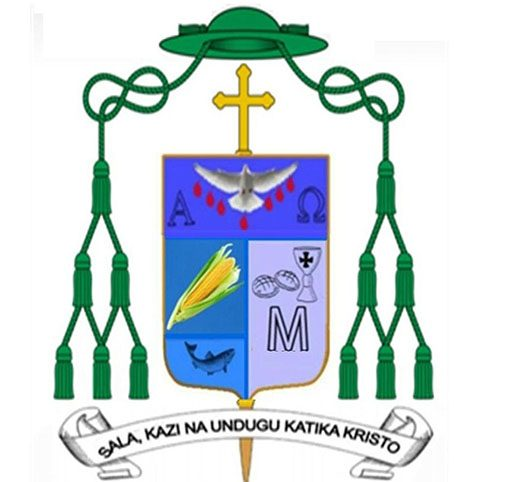
- Coat of arms

Styles of Beatus Christian Urassa
- Reference style: His Excellency; The Most Reverend
- Spoken style: Your Excellency
- Religious style: Bishop

Beatus Christian Urassa, ALCP/OSS (born on 2 August 1965) in Keni Mashati Village, Rombo District, is a Tanzanian Catholic bishop, currently serving as the Bishop of the Roman Catholic Diocese of Sumbawanga since 24 June 2018. He succeeded Bishop Damian Kyaruzi, who retired due to age.

== Background and education ==
He was born on 2 August 1965 in Keni Mashati Village, in Rombo District, Kilimanjaro Region in the Diocese of Moshi, Tanzania. He attended the Congregation Apostles of Jesus Major Seminary in Nairobi, Kenya, where he studied philosophy. He then studied Theology at St. Charles Lwanga Interdiocesan Major Seminary in Segerea, Dar Es Salaam. Later, he graduated with a Doctorate degree in Spiritual Theology from the Pontifical Teresianum Institute in Rome.

== Priest ==
He was ordained priest of Opus Spiritus Sancti on 12 July 1997. He served in various roles as priest including as:

- Secretary of the General Council of the Religious Congregation ALCP/OSS in Moshi, Tanzania from 1997 until 1998
- Vice-parish priest of Mwananyamala Parish, Dar es Salaam from 1998 until 1999
- Formator in the ALCP/OSS formation house in Morogoro, Tanzania from 1999 until 2000
- Provincial Superior ALCP/OSS from 2003 until 2015.

At the time he was appointed bishop, he was working at Eslarn Parish, Regensburg Diocese in Germany.

== Bishop ==
On 19 April 2018 Pope Francis appointed Father Beatus Christian Urassa, as Bishop of Sumbawanga. This occurred after the Holy Father accepted the age-related resignation from the pastoral care of the Diocese of Sumbawanga, Tanzania, presented by Bishop Damian Kyaruzi.

He was consecrated and installed in an open field outside the Sumbawanga Cathedral, in the Diocese of Sumbawanga on 24 June 2018. The Principal Consecrator was Polycarp Cardinal Pengo, Archbishop of Dar-es-Salaam assisted by Archbishop Paul Runangaza Ruzoka, Archbishop of Tabora and Bishop Damian Kyaruzi, Bishop Emeritus of Sumbawanga.

Bishop Beatus Christian Urassa, is a Catholic Church leader in Tanzania. He is a member of the Apostolic Life Community of Priests in the Opus Spiritus Sancti (ALCP/OSS) congregation, which celebrated the 50th anniversary of the introduction in the Order in the country on 21 November 2024 at the Formation House Sabuko, in the Roman Catholic Diocese of Moshi.

== See also ==
- Catholic Church in Tanzania
