= Josaphat Jackson Bududu =

Tanzanian Catholic prelate (born 1977)

The Most Reverend Josaphat Jackson Bududu
- Auxiliary Bishop-Elect of Tabora, Tanzania
- Church: Catholic Church
- Archdiocese: Roman Catholic Archdiocese of Tabora
- See: Roman Catholic Diocese of Tabora
- Appointed: 26 February 2025
- Installed: 25 May 2025

Orders
- Ordination: 9 July 2009 by Paul Runangaza Ruzoka
- Consecration: 24 May 2025 by Protase Rugambwa
- Rank: Bishop

Personal details
- Born: Josaphat Jackson Bududu; 26 March 1977 (age 48) Kaliua, Archdiocese of Tabora, Tabora Region, Tanzania

Styles of Josaphat Jackson Bududu
- Reference style: Your Lordship; The Most Reverend
- Spoken style: His Lordship
- Religious style: Bishop

Josaphat Jackson Bududu (born 26 March 1977) is a Tanzanian Catholic prelate who was appointed bishop of the Roman Catholic Archdiocese of Tabora, Tanzania on 26 February 2025. Before that, from 9 July 2009 until 26 February 2025, he was a priest of the Catholic Archdiocese of Tabora. He was contemporaneously appointed as Titular Bishop of Vegesela in Numidia, on 26 February 2025. His consecration and installation at Tabora took place on 25 May 2025.

== Background and education ==
He was born on 26 March 1977 in Kaliua, in the Archdiocese of Tabora, Tabora Region, Tanzania. He studied philosophy at Kibosho Major Seminary in the Roman Catholic Diocese of Moshi. He then studied Theology at Kipalapala Major Seminary in Tabora Archdiocese. He holds a Doctorate in Spirituality, awarded by the Tamil Nadu Institute of Spirituality and St. Peter's Pontifical Seminary in Bangalore, India.

== Priesthood ==
On 25 January 2009, he was ordained a deacon of the archdiocese of Tabora. Six months later, on 9 July 2009, he was ordained a priest of the Archdiocese of Tabora. On both occasions he was ordained by Archbishop Paul Runangaza Ruzoka, Archbishop of Tabora.

He served in many roles during his priesthood including:

- Formator at Archbishop Mario Mgulunde Propaedeutic Seminary in Kipalapala.
- Professor at St. Paul's Senior Seminary in Kipalapala.
- Spiritual Director of the Religious Congregation of the Daughters of Mary Sisters in Tabora.
- Parish priest of St. Joseph's Parish Kipalapala, Archdiocese of Tabora.
- Vicar for Consecrated Life, Archdiocese of Tabora.

== As bishop ==
Pope Francis appointed him as Auxiliary Bishop of the Roman Catholic Archdiocese of Tabora, on 26 February 2025. He was appointed to work with and to assist Cardinal Protase Rugambwa, the Local Ordinary of the archdiocese. Monsignor Josaphat Jackson Bududu was contemporaneously appointed Titular Bishop of Vegesela in Numidia. The consecration as bishop and installation of Monsignor Josaphat Jackson Bududu at Tabora occurred on 25 May 2025. The Principal Consecrator was Cardinal Protase Rugambwa, Archbishop of Tabora assisted by Paul Runangaza Ruzoka, Archbishop Emeritus of Tabora and Eusebius Alfred Nzigilwa, Bishop of Mpanda. At the time of his consecration, aged 48 years, he was the youngest Catholic bishop in the Tanzanian Conference of Catholic Bishops.

== See also ==
- Catholic Church in Tanzania

== Succession table ==
Catholic Church titles
Preceded by	Auxiliary Bishop of Tabora (since 26 February 2025)	Succeeded by
