= Roman Catholic Diocese of Nzega =

Catholic diocese in Tanzania

Coordinates: 04°13′00″S 33°11′10″E

Diocese of Nzega Dioecesis Nzegaesis

Location
- Country: Tanzania
- Metropolitan: Tabora

Statistics
- Area: 14,237 km^{2} (5,497 sq mi)
- Population: Total; Catholics: (as of 2026); 1,263,147; 139,304 (11.0%)

Information
- Rite: Latin Rite

Current leadership
- Pope: Leo XIV
- Bishop: Joseph Mashaka Triphon, C.S.Sp. (appointed by Pope Leo XIV on 11 November 2026)

The Roman Catholic Diocese of Nzega (Latin: Dioecesis Nzegaensis) is a diocese located in Nzega in the ecclesiastical province of Tabora in Tanzania.

== Location ==
The Catholic Diocese of Nzega is located in the Tabora Region, in northcentral Tanzania. It comprises the districts of Nzega and Igunga. The new diocese made a suffragan of the Roman Catholic Archdiocese of Tabora.

== History ==
- 11 November 2026: Established as Roman Catholic Diocese of Nzega from the Archdiocese of Tabora by Pope Leo XIV.

== Leadership ==
- Bishops of Nzega (Roman rite)
  - Bishop Joseph Mashaka Triphon, C.S.Sp. (Appointed 11 November 2026)

== Cathedral ==
The Church of Saint Bernadette, located in the city of Nzega, serves as the diocesan cathedral.

== See also ==
- Roman Catholicism in Tanzania
