= Opus Spiritus Sancti =

Roman Catholic society of apostolic life

- Formation: Founded: 1950 by Rev. Fr. Bernhard Bendel
- Founder: Rev. Fr. Bernhard Bendel
- Type: Apostolic Life Society of Diocesan right
- Post-nominal initials: O.S.S

The Opus Spiritus Sancti, (literally meaning "Work of the Holy Spirit") is a Catholic organization originating from Germany. It consists of five institutes of consecrated life and societies of apostolic life, all dedicated to promoting the mission of the Holy Spirit through various religious and charitable works.

== History ==
The organization was founded by Father Bernhard Bendel in 1950 at Königstein im Taunus, Germany, who was then a priest of the diocese of Limburg, Germany, and the pastor at the village of Mammolshain. Members of these institutes or societies append the initials 'O.S.S.' to their names.

In October 1949, Bendel discussed the founding of a sisterhood with the then Vicar General of the Diocese of Limburg, Georg Höhle. Further discussions followed, in which Limburg Bishop Wilhelm Kempf (bishop) also participated. In January 1950, Bernhard Bendel made a pilgrimage to Rome to the tombs of the Apostles Peter and Paul on the occasion of the beatification of Vincent Pallotti. The bishop's words, "You can have a much deeper impact on the Church by establishing a new sisterhood congregation than by being just a pastor in a parish," finally led him to agree to the founding of a sisterhood congregation.

== Communities ==
- Apostolic Life Community of the Sisters – Sisters of the Holy Spirit (ALCS) (1950)
- Secular Institute for Women – Holy Spirit Community (SIW) (1951/1977)
- Community of Apostolic Christians (CAC) (1953)
- Secular Institute for Priests (SIP) (1954)
- Apostolic Life Community of Priests (ALCP) (1974)

=== Apostolic Life Community of Sisters (ALCS) ===
Starting with seven deaconess sisters, Bernhard Bendel developed a women's community from 1950, which called itself Opus Spiritus Sancti (Work of the Holy Spirit). May 28, 1950, is considered the founding day of the Opus Spiritus Sancti. Initially, married women also belonged to the community. A little later, unmarried women joined as external sisters. For many years, there was the form of life of external and internal sisters. In 1972, the external and some of the internal sisters parted ways by mutual agreement. Since then, two communities have existed side by side: the Sisters and the Secular Institute for Women. The international leader is Sr. Mary Sosamma Thekkechundevalel, currently in Königstein-Mammolshain.

=== Pastoral Assistants ===
In May 1950, Bernhard Bendel established a training plan that was recognized by the Episcopal Ordinariate of Limburg. The sisters were to receive basic theological knowledge and were also to assist priests in pastoral care in the parishes. After completing the training, they received the "Missio canonica." All sisters were to prepare for their service through this training. This training also formed the basis of the Theological-Pastoral Seminar founded in 1956.

=== Women (SIW) ===
The international leader of this community is Theresia Mrosso from Tanzania. The leader of the German community is Johanna Lehmann, Königstein-Mammolshain.

=== Secular Priests (SIP) ===
Since 1952, a secular institute for diocesan priests has developed, whose members dedicated their lives to the Holy Spirit. As early as 1960, the community of priests and sisters began to expand beyond the borders of Germany, to the US, Africa, and India. The international leader is Rev. Fr. Raymond Ambroise, India.

=== Laity (CAC) ===
The Community of Apostolic Christians (CAC) originally started as a prayer circle. The current international leader is Mrs. Inge Keller from Oberursel, and for Germany, Mrs. Bernadette Knauer, Mainz, is responsible.

=== Apostolic Life Community of Priests (ALCP) ===
The international leader is Rev. Fr. Joseph Israel (priest), Moshi, Tanzania. Several bishops belong to the community:

- Ludovick Joseph Minde, Bishop of Moshi,
- Joseph Roman Mlola, Bishop of Kigoma, and
- Beatus Christian Urassa, Bishop of Sumbawanga.

=== 3rd Order ===
Both SIP and SIW have circles of friends who meet regularly.

== Spirituality ==
The OSS practices an Easter-Pentecostal spirituality, which is laid down in the Directorium Spirituale (published by the ILT of the Opus Spiritus Sancti). The founder Rector Bernhard Bendel aimed to work for the renewal of the Church. His vision was a "New Pentecost," a Church that is not trapped in structures and rules, but lives from the power of the living Spirit and allows itself to be led by Him.

== Geographical distribution ==
- Germany: Members of the OSS are found in the dioceses of Limburg (1950), Würzburg, Munich, Mainz (1970), Trier (1994), and Cologne (2001).
- USA: Members of the OSS live in the states of Iowa (1962), Oregon (1974), Arizona, Rhode Island.
- Africa: Members of the OSS live in the countries of Tanzania (1964), Malawi (1993), Kenya (1987), South Africa, Uganda.
- India: Members of the OSS live in the states of Andhra Pradesh (1981), Kerala (1975), Maharashtra, Tamil Nadu.
- Philippines: Since 1994, members of the OSS have also lived in the Philippines.

== Committees ==
- General Statute of the Communities in the Opus Spiritus Sancti (German)
- General Constitution of the Communities in the Opus Spiritus Sancti (English), (published by the ILT of the Opus Spiritus Sancti)
- International Leadership Team (ILT)
- International Council meets every six years, elects ILT members as well as the international leader, and confirms the "General Constitution"
- Country Coordinator/Leadership Team

== Leadership ==
Past leaders of the Opus were;

- Rector Bernhard Bendel,
- Rev. Fr. Karl-Wilhelm Bruno,
- Rev. Fr. Jim McCormick, and
- Rev. Fr. Thomas J. Flanagan.

== Bernhard-Bendel House ==
The conference house of the communities is under the leadership of SIW and SIP, further advised by a spiritual director. The longtime leader was Pastor Paul-Albert Simon, who died during a trip to Africa in the summer of 2005.

== Publications ==
- Karl W. Bruno/ Thomas J. Flanagan (eds.), History of the Opus Spiritus Sancti (1996)
- Karl W. Bruno/ Thomas J. Flanagan (eds.), Geschichte des Opus Spiritus Sancti (1996)
- Karl W. Bruno, A Spirituality of Pentecost in the Opus Spiritus Sancti (1981)
- Karl W. Bruno, Pfingstliche Spiritualität im Opus Spiritus Sancti (1981)
- Karl W. Bruno, Living the Spirituality of the Opus Spiritus Sancti (1984)
- Karl W. Bruno, Die Spiritualität des Opus Spiritus Sancti täglich leben: Meditationen nach dem Kirchenjahr (1984)
- Amedeus Macha, The Juridical Identity of the Societies of Apostolic Life Compared to Institutes of Consecrated Life in the Light of the Present Code of Canon Law (CIC), Can. 731 - a Comparative Study (Rome 1994)
- Phocas A. Masawe, The Spirituality of the Opus Spiritus Sancti (Rome 1988)
- Ludovic J. Minde, True Greatness in the Christian Community (Luke 9:46-48 and Par.), Rome 1995
- Henry Njaamba Mrema, The Apostolic Life Community of Priests, History and Spirituality (Rome 1998)
- Sosamama Naduvelayil, The Spirituality of the Opus Spiritus Sancti, o. O., o. J.
