= Dagorlad and the Dead Marshes =

Tabletop role-playing game adventure

Dagorlad and the Dead Marshes is a 1984 fantasy role-playing game adventure published by Iron Crown Enterprises for Middle-earth Role Playing.

== Contents ==
Dagorlad and the Dead Marshes is an adventure that takes place on the plain of Dagorlad, a battle site located north of Mordor.

== Reception ==
Andy Blakeman reviewed Dagorlad and the Dead Marshes for Imagine magazine, and stated that "Dagorlad and the Dead Marshes is the least spectacular of the modules, but will surely provide hours of role·playing and adventure."

William A. Barton reviewed Dagorlad and the Dead Marshes in The Space Gamer No. 73. Barton commented that "The suggested adventures are extensive in scope and more complete than those of Bree. Good for a party of adventurers who wish to visit a nasty area (with some safe havens for relaxation between adventures."
