= Diocese of Kigoma =

Roman Catholic diocese in Tanzania, Africa

Coordinates: 4.883333°S 29.633333°E

Diocese of Kigoma Dioecesis Kigomaënsis
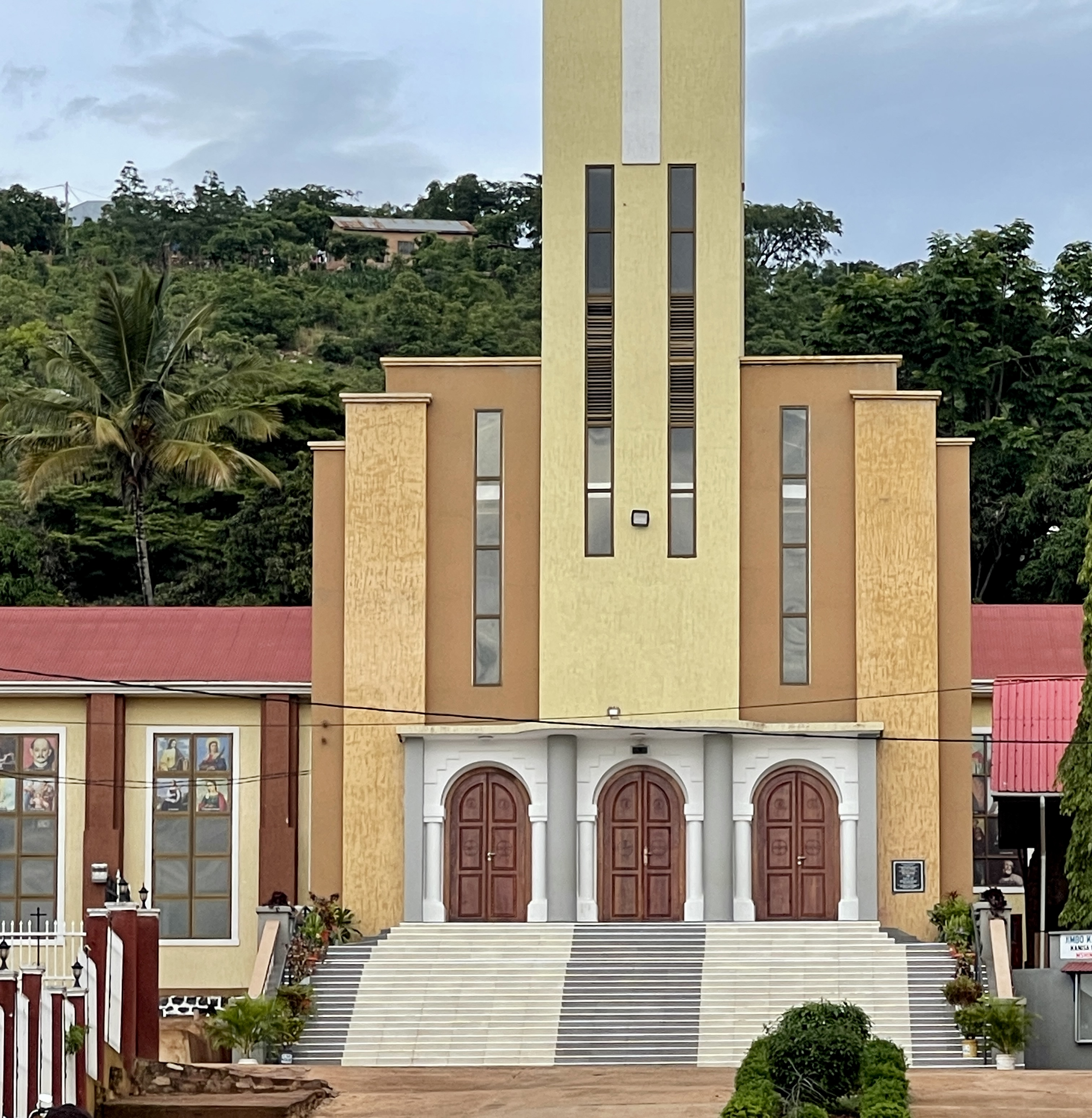

Location
- Country: Tanzania
- Metropolitan: Tabora

Statistics
- Area: 42,000 km^{2} (16,000 sq mi)
- Population: Total; Catholics: (as of 2004); 1,680,009; 409,900 (24.4%)

Information
- Rite: Latin Rite

Current leadership
- Pope: Leo XIV
- Bishop: Joseph R. Mlola, ALCP/OSS

Website
- Catholickigomadiocese.org

The Roman Catholic Diocese of Kigoma (Latin: Dioecesis Kigomaënsis) is a diocese located in Kigoma in the ecclesiastical province of Tabora in Tanzania. Because of the appointment of Bishop Protase Rugambwa as an Archbishop ad personam (given the personal title of archbishop with the position of Deputy Secretary of the Congregation for the Evangelization of Peoples and President of the Pontifical Mission Societies) by Pope Benedict XVI on Tuesday, June 26, 2012, the Diocese became a vacant see (sede vacante).

== History ==
- 27 September 1880: Established as the Apostolic Vicariate of Tanganyika from the Apostolic Vicariate of Central Africa in Sudan
- 10 May 1946: Renamed as Apostolic Vicariate of Kigoma
- 25 March 1953: Promoted as the Diocese of Kigoma

Read more on the website

- catholickigomadiocese.org

== Leadership ==
- Vicars Apostolic of Tanganika (Latin rite)
  - Jean-Baptiste-Frézal Charbonnier, M. Afr. (1887.01.14 – 1888.03.16)
  - Léonce Bridoux, M. Afr. (1888.06.15 – 1890.10.21)
  - Adolphe Lechaptois, M. Afr. (1891.06.19 – 1917.11.30)
  - Joseph-Marie Birraux, M. Afr. (1920.04.22 – 1936.04.22)
  - John van Sambeek, M. Afr. (1936.11.19 – 1946.05.10 see below)
- Vicar Apostolic of Kigoma (Latin rite)
  - John van Sambeek, M. Afr. (see above 1946.05.10 – 1953.03.25 see below)
- Bishops of Kigoma (Latin rite)
  - John van Sambeek, M. Afr. (see above 1953.03.25 – 1957.11.22)
  - James Holmes-Siedle, M. Afr. (1958.08.05 – 1969.12.15)
  - Alphonse Daniel Nsabi (1969.12.15 – 1989.08.16)
  - Paul R. Ruzoka (1989.11.10 – 2006.11.25); named Archbishop of the Roman Catholic Archdiocese of Tabora
  - Protase Rugambwa (2008.01.18 - 2012.06.26); named Archbishop (President of the Pontifical Mission Societies and Adjunct Secretary of the Congregation for the Evangelization of Peoples), Currently Archbishop of the Roman Catholic Archdiocese of Tabora
  - Joseph R. Mlola, ALCP/OSS, (2014.07.10 - present)

== Other diocesan clergy appointed bishops ==
  - Monsignor Christopher Ndizeye Nkoronko, appointed Bishop of the Roman Catholic Diocese of Kahama (23 June 2022 - present)

== See also ==
- Roman Catholicism in Tanzania

== Sources ==
- GCatholic.org
- Catholic Hierarchy
- catholickigomadiocese.org
