= Charles Msakila =

Tanzanian catholic bishop

The Most Reverend Charles Msakila
- Bishop of Sumbawanga
- Church: Roman Catholic
- Archdiocese: Tabora
- Diocese: Sumbawanga
- See: Sumbawanga
- Installed: November 13, 1958
- Term ended: February 23, 1994
- Predecessor: James Holmes-Siedle, M. Afr.
- Successor: Damian Kyaruzi

Orders
- Ordination: August 31, 1947
- Consecration: December 27, 1958 by Pope John XXIII

Personal details
- Born: November 10, 1919; Karema, Tanganyika Territory
- Died: February 23, 1994 (aged 74)

Charles Msakila (November 10, 1919 - February 23, 1994) was a Roman Catholic bishop from Tanzania. He was ordained a priest on August 31, 1947, and was appointed bishop of the Diocese of Karema on November 13, 1958. The ordination to the bishop followed on December 27. The principal consecrator was Pope John XXIII, assisted by Girolamo Bartolomeo Bortignon and Gioacchino Muccin.

On October 24, 1969, the Diocese of Karema changed its name to Sumbawanga. Msakila attended the Second Vatican Council and led his diocese until his death.
