= Minas Ithil (Middle-earth Role Playing) =

Minas Ithil is a 1991 role-playing supplement for Middle-earth Role Playing published by Iron Crown Enterprises.

== Contents ==
Minas Ithil is a supplement in which the city of Minas Ithil is explored in detail.

== Publication history ==
Minas Ithil was the second publication in the "Cities of Middle-Earth" series after Minas Tirith.

== Reception ==
Herb Petro reviewed Minas Ithil in White Wolf #31 (May/June, 1992), rating it a 3 out of 5 and stated that "The few pages of game-specific statistics provided are limited to those needed for simple combat. Therefore, this product needs no adaptation (other than historical) to be employed with any game system or any campaign background. Anyone in need of a detailed city, and of course Middle-Earth buffs, should check out Minas Ithil."
