= Chris Seeman =

American game designer and academic

Chris Seeman is an American professor of theology and role-playing game author. He is a professor of theology at Walsh University.

== Early life ==
Seeman was born and raised in California. He has a B.A. from the University of San Francisco, and an M.A. from Graduate Theological Union. Seeman holds a Ph.D. in Near Eastern religions from the University of California, Berkeley.

== Career ==
Seeman is chair of the Division of Humanities and a professor of theology at Walsh University in North Canton, Ohio.

== Role-playing games ==
Seeman began publishing the Middle-earth Role Playing fanzine Other Hands in 1993. Jessica Ney-Grimm of Iron Crown Enterprises (ICE) contributed MERP content to Other Hands, and Seeman later became an assistant line editor on the game for ICE. Seeman worked on The Lord of the Rings Roleplaying Game for Decipher, Inc.

In 1992 he established Other Hands Magazine: The International Journal of Middle-earth Gaming, which he published on a quarterly basis until 2001. He has also been co-editor and author for The Guild Companion eZine. He created and manages a website called The Tolkien Music List.

== Games ==
=== MERP ===
- "Kin-strife". Archived from the original on February 4, 2007. (1995)
- Southern Gondor: The Land (1996)
- "Southern Gondor: The People". Archived from the original on February 4, 2007. (1996)
- "Arnor: The Land". Archived from the original on February 4, 2007. (1997)
- "Arnor: The People". Archived from the original on February 4, 2007. (1997)
- "The Northern Waste". Archived from the original on April 15, 2007. (1997)
- "Hands of the Healer". Archived from the original on February 4, 2007. (1997)

=== Decipher LotR RPG ===
- "Fell Beasts and Wondrous Magic". Archived from the original on September 27, 2007. (2003)
- "Moria". Archived from the original on March 4, 2007. (2003)
