= Joseph Sipendi =

Tanzanian Roman Catholic bishop

- Bishop of Moshi
- Church: Catholic Church
- Diocese: Diocese of Moshi
- In office: 11 January 1968 – 29 April 1985
- Predecessor: Joseph Kilasara
- Successor: Amedeus Msarikie
- Previous post: Apostolic Administrator of Zanzibar and Pemba (1966-1968)

Orders
- Ordination: 20 December 1942
- Consecration: 24 March 1968 by Laurean Rugambwa

Personal details
- Born: 19 March 1915 Kilema, German East Africa, German Empire
- Died: 29 April 1985 (aged 70)

Joseph Sipendi (19 March 1915 – 29 April 1985) was a Tanzanian clergyman and bishop for the Roman Catholic Diocese of Moshi, having previously been Bishop of Zanzibar.

== Biography ==
In 1928 Joseph Sipendi attended the minor seminary in Kilema. From 1937 to 1945 Sipendi studied in Rome, where he obtained degrees in Catholic theology and canon law He received the Sacrament of Holy Orders on 20 December 1942. From 1966 to 1968 Sipendi was Apostolic Administrator of Zanzibar and Pemba.

On 11 January 1968, Pope Paul VI appointed him Bishop of Moshi. The bishop of Bukoba, Laurean Cardinal Rugambwa, conferred episcopal consecration on him on 24 March of the same year at Christ the King Cathedral in Moshi; his Co-consecrators were the Archbishop of Tabora, Marko Mihayo, and the Bishop Emeritus of Moshi, Joseph Kilasara, CSSp. He died in 1985.
