= Diocese of Sumbawanga =

Roman Catholic diocese in Tanzania, Africa

Coordinates: 7.966667°S 31.616667°E

Diocese of Sumbawanga Dioecesis Sumbavangensis

Location
- Country: Tanzania
- Metropolitan: Mbeya

Statistics
- Area: 28,654 km^{2} (11,063 sq mi)
- Population: Total; Catholics: (as of 2004); 928,941; 607,143 (65.4%)

Information
- Rite: Latin Rite

Current leadership
- Pope: Leo XIV
- Bishop: Beatus Christian Urassa, ALCP/OSS
- Bishops emeritus: Damian Kyaruzi

The Roman Catholic Diocese of Sumbawanga (Latin: Dioecesis Sumbavangensis) is a diocese located in Sumbawanga in the ecclesiastical province of Mbeya in Tanzania.

== History ==
- 1880: Established as the Apostolic Vicariate of Tanganyika from the Apostolic Vicariate of Central Africa in Sudan
- May 10, 1946: Renamed as Apostolic Vicariate of Karema
- March 25, 1953: Promoted as Diocese of Karema
- October 24, 1969: Renamed as Diocese of Sumbawanga
- December 21, 2018: Changed metropolia from Tabora to Mbeya

== Leadership ==
- Vicars Apostolic of Tanganyika (Roman rite) -- see also separate article Apostolic Vicariate of Tanganyika
  - Bishop Jean-Baptiste-Frézal Charbonnier, M. Afr. (1887.01.14 - 1888.03.1616)
  - Bishop Léonce Bridoux, M. Afr. (1888.06.15 Jun 1888 - 1890.10.20)
  - Bishop Adolphe Le Chaptois, M. Afr. (1891.06.19 - 1917.11.30)
  - Bishop Joseph-Marie Birraux, M. Afr. (1920.04.22 - 1936.04.22), appointed Superior General of Missionaries of Africa (White Fathers)
  - Bishop Jan Cornelius van Sambeek, M. Afr. (1936.11.19 - 1947.05.10), appointed Vicar Apostolic of Kigoma
- Vicar Apostolic of Karema (Roman rite)
  - Bishop James Holmes-Siedle, M. Afr. (1946.07.29 – 1953.03.25 see below)
- Bishops of Karema (Roman rite)
  - Bishop James Holmes-Siedle, M. Afr. (see above 1953.03.25 – 1958.08.05), appointed Bishop of Kigoma
  - Bishop Charles Msakila (1958.11.13 – 1969.10.24 see below)
- Bishops of Sumbawanga (Roman rite)
  - Bishop Charles Msakila (see above 1969.10.24 – 1994.02.23)
  - Bishop Damian Kyaruzi (1997.04.21 - 2018.04.19)
  - Bishop Beatus Christian Urassa (since 2018.04.19)

== See also ==
- Roman Catholicism in Tanzania

== Sources ==
- GCatholic.org
- Catholic Hierarchy
