= Isengard and Northern Gondor =

Role-playing game supplement

Isengard and Northern Gondor is a 1983 fantasy role-playing game supplement published by Iron Crown Enterprises for Middle-earth Role Playing.

== Contents ==
Isengard and Northern Gondor is a campaign module that details the plains of Calenardhon (which later became Rohan) in Northern Gondor, and Saruman's tower of Orthanc at Isengard.

== Reception ==
William A. Barton reviewed Isengard and Northern Gondor in The Space Gamer No. 73.
