= Lords of Middle-earth, Volume I =

1985 supplement for Middle-earth Role Playing

Cover art by Angus McBride

Lords of Middle-earth, Volume I, subtitled "The Immortals", is a supplement published by Iron Crown Enterprises (I.C.E.) in 1986 for the fantasy role-playing game Middle-earth Role Playing (MERP), itself based on the works of J.R.R. Tolkien.

== Contents ==
Lords of Middle-earth, Volume I is the first of three supplements that detail all the characters that have appeared in J.R.R. Tolkien's history of Middle-earth. The first volume focuses on the immortal beings from The Silmarillion, as well as those encountered in The Hobbit and The Lord of the Rings.

The book is divided into three chapters, each describing one branch of the immortals:

- Fourteen Valar, their role in the events of The Silmarillion and their continuing role in the story of Middle-earth.
- Nineteen Maiar, servants of the Valar. This includes the five Istari (wizards such as Gandalf, Saruman, and Radagast) who were sent to Middle-earth to aid mortals.
- Elves, including their history, their nature, and the various branches of their family (the Noldor, Sindar, Avari, etc.)

The fourth chapter details three great enemies of mortals: Ungoliant, Morgoth, and Sauron.

Various tables describe each of the above in MERP game terms, should the player characters ever encounter them.

== Publication history ==
I.C.E. acquired the license to publish games based on Tolkien's works from the Tolkien Estate in the early 1980s, and released MERP in 1984. This was followed by a large number of supplements, including a series of three books highlighting every named character that appears in Tolkien's Middle-earth works. The first of these was Lords of Middle-earth, Volume I: The Immortals, a 112-page softcover book designed by Peter Fenlon, Terence Amthor, and Mark Colborn, with cover art by Angus McBride and interior art by Liz Danforth, Jim Holloway, and Stephan Peregrine.

I.C.E. published two more books in the series: Lords of Middle-earth, Volume II: The Mannish Races (1987), and Lords of Middle-earth, Volume III: Hobbits, Dwarves, Ents, Orcs & Trolls (1989), as well as Creatures of Middle-earth (1988).

== Reception ==
In Issue 87 of White Dwarf, Graham Staplehurst commented, "There is no doubt that this book is very useful. It will be less use if you've already got a lot of the MERP packages, since the Valar and Maiar are unlikely to make many appearances, but for those who are interested in Tolkien's world and are running (or want to run) a campaign there, LOME is excellent source material."

In Issue 79 of Space Gamer/Fantasy Gamer, J. Michael Caparula noted "This format and amount of information here is terrific, but I'm anxious to see it applied to more down to earth types. I'd rather see my players encounter Faramir or Fatty Bolger than the likes of Ungoliant.".

In Issue 7 of Adventurer, Ste Dillon found the sheer number of elves described "rather daunting, as to use as chance occurrences or even as active non-player characters, there are too many to be employed with any effect in most campaigns." Dillon would have preferred fewer elves but some scenarios involving some of the major Elven personalities. Dillon concluded by calling this "a must for Middle Earth fanatics, but most of it is of no great use to GMs other than as a compendium of background detail, most of which can be gleaned from Tolkien's own writings ... this one is rather superfluous."

In Issue 127 of Dragon, Ken Rolston questioned the usefulness of this book, saying, "This is a lot of information on many high-level PCs, few (if any) of which will ever interact with any character in a typical MERP campaign. What are you supposed to do with this stuff?" Rolston concluded, "the interest of the character descriptions is probably proportional to your enthusiasm for Tolkien scholarship. If you're a big fan, you'll love it. If you're a moderate fan, check out the bios of Gandalf, Saruman, Tom Bombadil, the Balrog, Sauron, Galadriel, etc., and leave the rest alone."

In Issue 5 of Gateways, Dan Quartermain commented "Extensive backgrounds are provided along with a definition of the character's abilities and powers, so that a GM may indeed play out the Saga of the One Ring should he wish to." Quartermain concluded, "This is the book to get if that is your campaign goal. It would also be a good resource book for guest appearances by famous (or infamous) Tolkien characters."
