= Walsh University =

Catholic university in North Canton, Ohio, US

- Former names: LaMennais College (1951–1960); Walsh College (1960–1993)
- Motto: Sed Deus Dat Incrementum (Latin)
- Motto in English: "God Gives the Growth"
- Type: Private university
- Established: 1960; 66 years ago
- Religious affiliation: Catholic (La Mennais Brothers)
- President: Timothy J. Collins
- Students: 2,192 (fall 2024)
- Undergraduates: 1,523 (fall 2024)
- Postgraduates: 669 (fall 2024)
- Location: North Canton, Ohio, United States; 40°52′25″N 81°22′15″W
- Nickname: Cavaliers
- Sporting affiliations: NCAA Division II – G-MAC
- Mascot: Sir Walter the Cavalier
- Website: walsh.edu
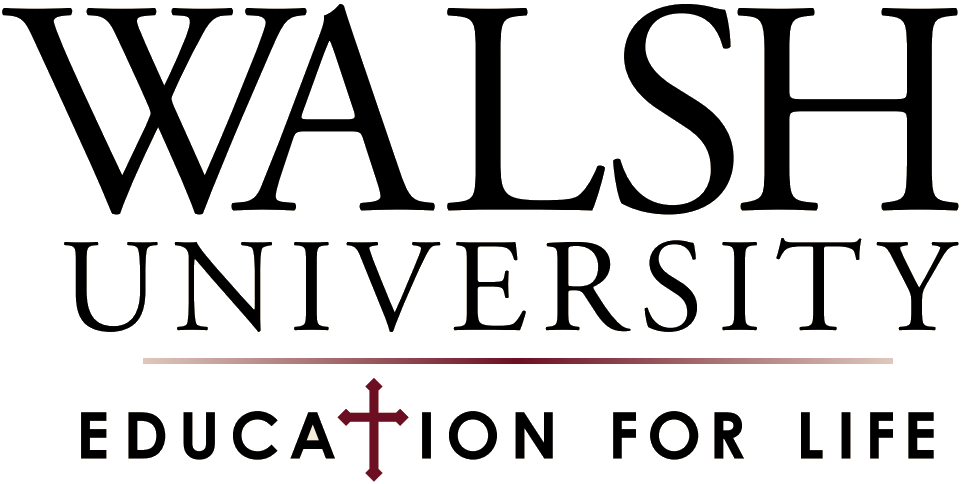

Walsh University is a private Catholic university in North Canton, Ohio, United States. Founded in 1960 by the Brothers of Christian Instruction as a liberal arts college, it enrolls approximately 2,100 students as of 2023. The university offers more than 70 undergraduate majors and seven graduate programs, as well as multiple global learning experiences.

== History ==
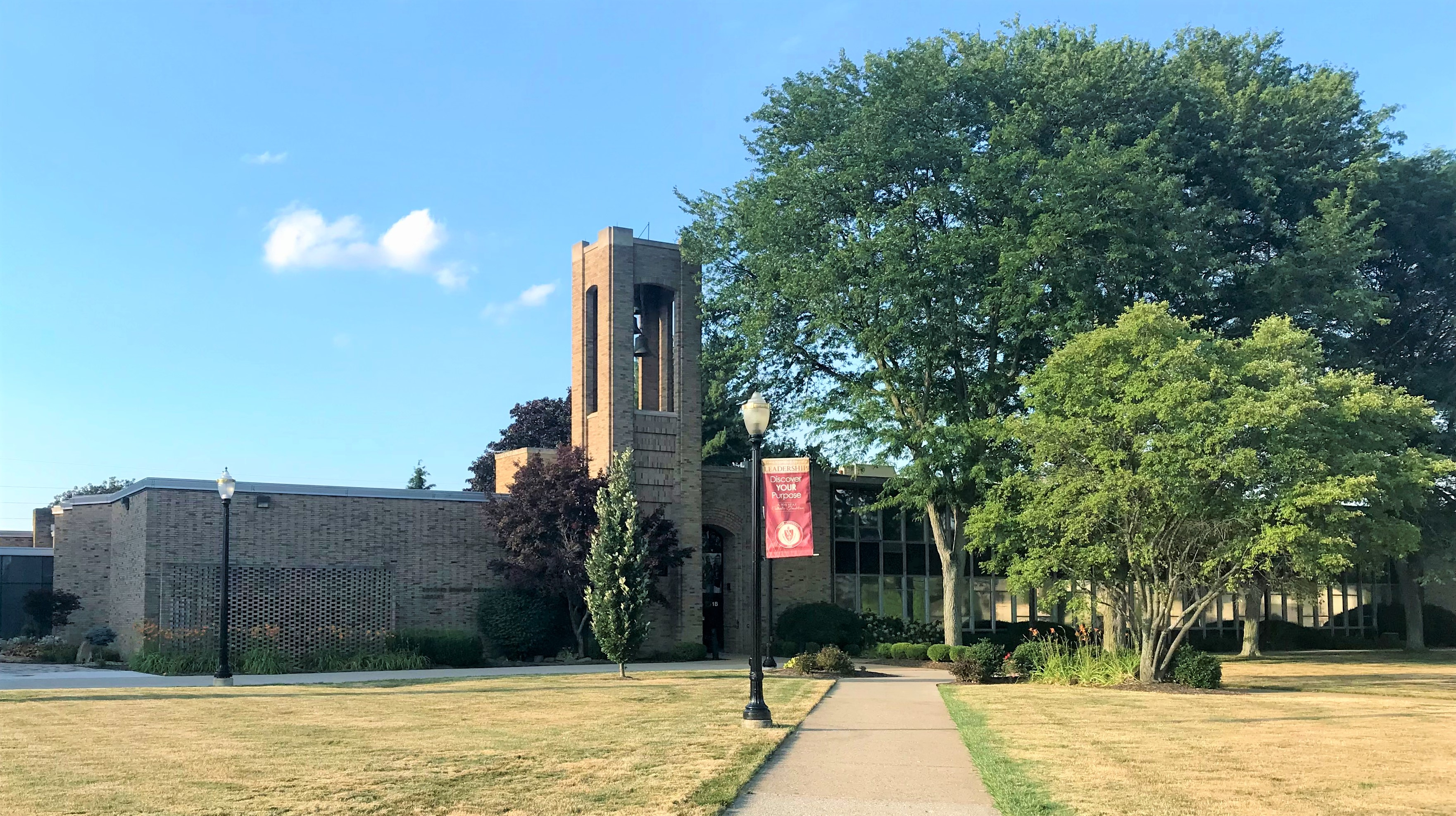
Farrell Hall, one of the two original buildings on campus.

The school's namesake is Emmet M. Walsh, Bishop of the Roman Catholic Diocese of Youngstown.

Walsh University was founded as LaMennais College in Alfred, Maine, in 1951 by the Brothers of Christian Instruction to educate young men as brothers and teachers. Ferdinand Waldo Demara, who was a member of the BCI under the alias of Brother John Payne, proceeded on his own and got the college chartered by the state. In 1957, Robert A. Francoeur of LaMennais College and William Hughes of Youngstown, Ohio, discussed the Brothers' wish to move LaMennais College from Maine and Walsh invited the Brothers to choose Canton, Ohio, as the new location. Walsh donated $304,000 to the Walsh College project. In 1959, the present location of Walsh University began as 50 acres (20 ha) of farmland on which two buildings were constructed, College Hall and LaMennais Hall, which continues to house the Brothers and international priest-students. The Brothers have played an active role at the institution, serving as faculty during the original years and playing a part in the growth and development of facilities and programs. Several have served as president.

Walsh College became Walsh University in 1993. In 2013, Walsh University joined Division II of the National Collegiate Athletic Association (NCAA). Walsh previously competed in the National Association of Intercollegiate Athletics (NAIA) as a member of the American Mideast Conference, while its football team competed in the Mid-States Football Association.

=== Presidents ===
On July 1, 2019, Walsh University announced that Timothy J. Collins was appointed to serve as the university's seventh president.

Presidents:

- Thomas Farrell, 1960–1970
- Robert Francoeur, 1970–1977
- Francis Blouin, 1978–1992
- Richard Mucowski, 1992–1996
- Kenneth Hamilton, 1997–2001
- Richard Jusseaume, 2002–2019
- Timothy Collins, 2019–present

== Campus ==
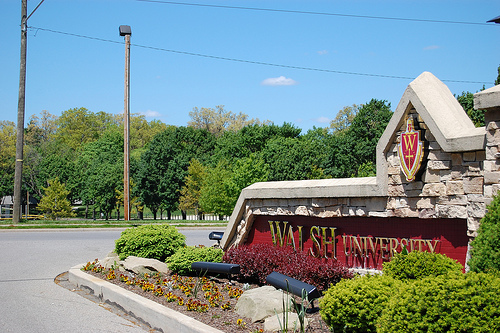
Entrance to Walsh University's Westgate

The campus covers 136 acres (55 ha) and is made up of 27 buildings along East Maple Street in North Canton.

Buildings include:

- Farrell Hall (1960) - This was the first building on campus. Construction started in 1959 and finished in 1960. It was initially named College Hall and was later renamed in honor of Br. Thomas Farrell in 1977, the first president and one of the founding Brothers of Christian Instruction.
- LaMennais Hall (1960)
- Gaetano M. Cecchini Family Health and Wellness Complex (1971/2009) - Formerly called the Physical Education Center. A major update and renovation occurred in 2009.
- The Don and Ida Betzler Social and Behavioral Sciences Center (1972)
- Hannon Child Development Center (1990)
- Aultman Health Foundation Byers School of Nursing and Health Sciences Center (2000)
- The Paul and Carol David Family Campus Center (2001)
- Timken Natural Sciences Center (2005)
- Barrette Business and Community Center (2005) - The Barrette Business and Community Center is the former site of the Rannou Center (1966–2004) and opened in 2005.
- Our Lady of Perpetual Help Chapel (2006)
- Birk Center for the Arts (2012)
- Saint John Paul II Center for Science Innovation (2015)
- Father Matthew Herttna Counseling Center
- St. Katharine Drexel House
- The Marlene and Joe Toot Global Learning Center (2018)

The campus includes dormitory residences named:

- Menard Hall/Betzler Towers (1966/2006) - Menard Hall was the first dormitory on campus and opened in 1966. The Betzler Tower was added in 2006.
- Seanor Hall (1968) - Seanor Hall was initially named Alexis Hall and had been named for Br. Alexis Guilbeaut, one of the Founding Brothers of the university.
- Lemmon Hall (1995)
- Brauchler Hall (1999), Meier Hall (2000), Stein Hall (2002) - colloquially called "The Grove Apartments"
- Marie & Ervin Wilkof Towers (2004)
- Olivieri Family Towers (2007)
- The Commons (2012).

The Walsh University Peace Pole outside Farrell Hall represents visitors including Willy Brandt, Coretta Scott King, Mother Teresa, and Elie Wiesel who came to Walsh University to advocate for peace.

Walsh also oversees the Hoover Historical Center which they acquired in April 2004.

== Academics ==
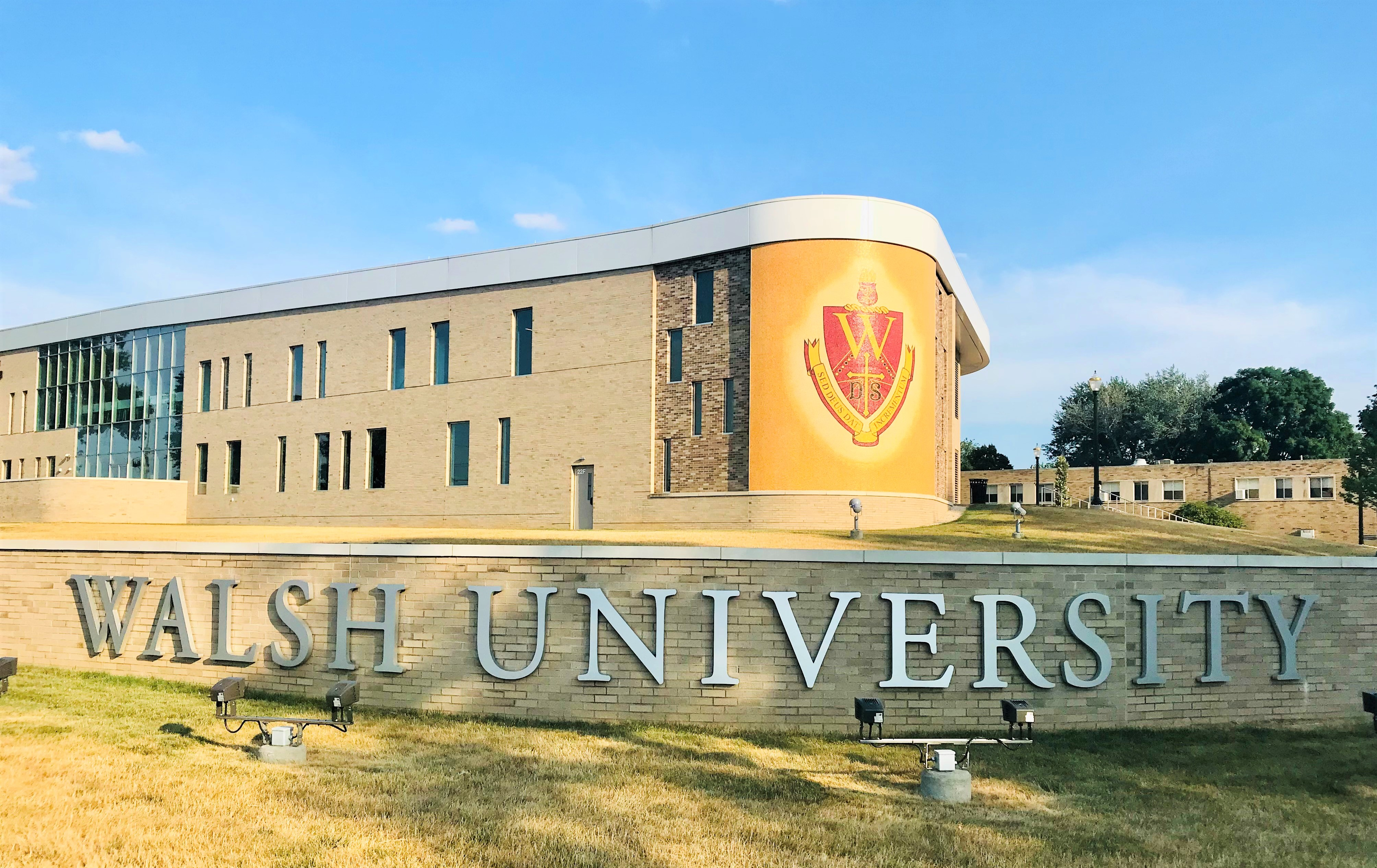
Toot Global Learning Center

The university offers over 60 undergraduate majors. It is the only college governed by the Roman Catholic Diocese of Youngstown.

Walsh University offers the following graduate degrees: Doctorate of Physical Therapy (DPT); Master of Occupational Therapy (MOT); Master of Science in Nursing (MSN); Master of Arts in Education (M.A.Ed); Master of Business Administration (M.B.A.); Master of Arts in Counseling and Human Development; Master of Arts in theology, and Doctor of Nursing Practice (DNP). Several graduate programs are offered in online and in an accelerated format.

Walsh University offers several opportunities for professional development, including a certificate in healthcare management, FNP certificate, and several educator certificates or licensures.

== Athletics ==
Walsh has 26 varsity athletic teams, and competes in the National Collegiate Athletic Association at the Division II level as a member of the Great Midwest Athletic Conference. The university's football team formerly played their home games at Tom Benson Hall of Fame Stadium, now playing on campus at Larry Staudt Field.

=== Varsity teams ===
Walsh sponsors 11 men's varsity teams: baseball, basketball, bowling, cross country, football, golf, soccer, lacrosse, tennis, rugby, and track and field. The school also sponsors 11 women's varsity teams: basketball, bowling, cross country, golf, lacrosse, rugby, soccer, softball, tennis, track and field, and volleyball.

In 2023–24, Walsh added one new sport for each sex. For men, sprint football was added. This is a variant of American football played under standard NCAA rules but governed outside the NCAA structure, with player weights restricted to a maximum of 178 pounds (81 kg). The new team played in the Midwest Sprint Football League. For women, the cheerleading discipline of STUNT, also not governed by the NCAA, was added.

Walsh University added men's and women's rugby after players and coaching staff from Notre Dame College chose Walsh as their new home. By April 2, 2024, 60 team members had signed letters of commitment at a ceremony on the Euclid campus.

== Notable people ==
=== Alumni ===
- Michael Skindell, 1983, former assistant attorney general of Ohio and State Representative for the 13th House District of Ohio
- Isaac Amani Massawe, 1988 and 1990, former Bishop for the Diocese of Moshi, Tanzania from 2007 to 2017 and current archbishop of Arusha, Tanzania
- Brian Rogers, 2005, professional football player, professional mixed martial artist
- Rayshaun Kizer, 2006, gridiron football player
- Joe Morgan, 2011, professional football player
- Ric Sayre, distance runner
- Sha Carter, 2018-2022, professional basketball player WNBA

=== Faculty and staff ===
- Bob Huggins, basketball coach at Walsh from 1980 to 1983. He led the Cavaliers to a perfect 30–0 regular season. (They finished 34–1 overall).
- Jim Dennison, football coach at Walsh from 1993 to 2012
