= Lords of Middle-earth, Volume II =

1987 supplement for Middle-earth Role Playing

Cover art by Angus McBride

Lords of Middle-earth, Volume II, subtitled "The Mannish Races", is a supplement published by Iron Crown Enterprises (I.C.E.) in 1987 for the fantasy role-playing game Middle-earth Role Playing (MERP), itself based on the works of J.R.R. Tolkien.

== Contents ==
Lords of Middle-earth, Volume II is the second of three supplements that detail all the characters that appeared in J.R.R. Tolkien's history of Middle-earth. The second volume gives descriptions and histories of the many humans in Tolkien's works. This includes the Nazgûl, the deadly spirits who were once human before falling victim to Sauron's rings.

Various tables describe each character in MERP game terms, should the player characters ever encounter them. There is also advice for the gamemaster on how to handle high-level characters.

== Publication history ==
I.C.E. acquired the license to publish games based on Tolkien's works from the Tolkien Estate in the early 1980s, and released MERP in 1984. This was followed by a large number of supplements, including a series of three books describing every named character that appears in Tolkien's Middle-earth works. The first of these was Lords of Middle-earth, Volume I: The Immortals (1985), and the second was Lords of Middle-earth, Volume II: The Mannish Races, a 112-page softcover book designed by Peter Fenlon, with cover art by Angus McBride and interior art by Liz Danforth.

I.C.E. published a third book in the series: Lords of Middle-earth, Volume III: Hobbits, Dwarves, Ents, Orcs & Trolls (1989), as well as the related book Creatures of Middle-earth (1988).

== Reception ==
In Issue 151 of Dragon (November 1989), Jim Bambra wrote, "Okay, Tolkien fans, [this is] for you! Full of background information on the ... mannish races of Middle-earth, it is a handy source of ideas for I.C.E.'s MERP game, other fantasy games, and lovers of Tolkien's creation."

== Reviews ==
- Computer and Video Games
