= Raiders of Cardolan =

1988 tabletop game adventure

Raiders of Cardolan is a 1988 tabletop game adventure published by Iron Crown Enterprises for Middle-earth.

== Plot summary ==
Raiders of Cardolan is an adventure in which three adventures have the player characters pursue a wanted rebel leader, battle coastal pirates, and investigate the schemes of Petty-dwarves deep within the Black Wood.

== Publication history ==
Raiders of Cardolan was written by Jeff McKeage, with a cover by Daniel Horne, and illustrations by Liz Danforth and published by Iron Crown Enterprises in 1988 as a 32-page book.

== Reviews ==
- G.M. #1
- Windgeflüster (Issue 27 - Oct 1994)

== See also ==
- Card game
- Board game
