= Nazgûl's Citadel =

Nazgûl's Citadel is a 1991 role-playing supplement for Middle-earth Role Playing published by Iron Crown Enterprises.

== Contents ==
Nazgûl's Citadel is a supplement in which the fortress Ny Chennacatt is detailed, which is used by the Nazgul Akhoahil.

== Publication history ==
Nazgûl's Citadel is part of the "Fortresses of Middle-Earth" series.

== Reception ==
Stewart Wieck reviewed Nazgûl's Citadel in White Wolf #31 (May/June, 1992), rating it a 4 out of 5 and stated that "ICE is able to maintain a level of historical consistency and complexity in its Middle-Earth products which would have made Tolkien proud. GMs of other game systems may find this 'dungeon' useful as well (and can be sure that their players are unlikely to have found this product)."
