= Damian Kyaruzi =

Tanzanian Roman Catholic prelate (born 1940)

Right Reverend Damian Kyaruzi
- Bishop Emeritus of Sumbawanga, Tanzania
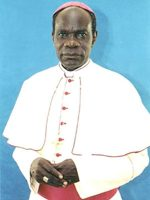
- His Lordship Bishop Damian Kyaruzi
- Church: Catholic Church
- Archdiocese: Roman Catholic Archdiocese of Mbeya
- Diocese: Roman Catholic Diocese of Sumbawanga
- See: Sumbawanga
- Appointed: 21 April 1997
- Installed: 29 June 1997
- Retired: 19 April 2018
- Predecessor: Charles Msakila
- Successor: Beatus Christian Urassa, ALCP/OSS
- Previous posts: Rector of St Anthony of Padua Ntungamo Major Seminary (1972-1977); Vicar General Roman Catholic Diocese of Bukoba (1986-1997)

Orders
- Ordination: 29 June 1968
- Consecration: 29 June 1997 by Mario Epifanio Abdallah Mgulunde

Personal details
- Born: Damian Kyaruzi; 22 April 1940 (age 86) Butahinamwa, Bukoba, Tanganyika Territory
- Denomination: Catholicism
- Residence: Sumbawanga
- Education: Katigondo Major Seminary (1962-1964); Pontifical Urban University, Rome (1964-1971)
- Motto: Nomen Domini Invocabo (Latin for 'I call in the name of the Lord')

Damian Kyaruzi (born 22 April 1940) is Tanzanian Roman Catholic prelate who was the Bishop of the Roman Catholic Diocese of Sumbawanga in Tanzania from 1997 until his age-related retirement in 2018. He was appointed bishop on 21 April 1997 by Pope John Paul II. He was consecrated and installed in Sumbawanga in June 1997. Pope Francis accepted his retirement on 19 April 2018 and appointed Bishop Beatus Christian Urassa, as his successor. Bishop Damian Kyaruzi lives on as Bishop Emeritus of Sumbawanga, Tanzania.

== Early life and education ==
He was born on 22 April 1940 at Butainamwa, Kagera Region, Tanzania. At that time, this was in the Apostolic Vicariate of Bukoba. He studied a Katigondo Major Seminary in Uganda. He also holds advanced degrees from the Pontifical Urban University in Rome, Italy.

== Priest ==
He was ordained a priest of Bukoba Diocese, Tanzania on 29 June 1968. He served in that capacity until 21 April 1997.

== Bishop ==
Pope John Paul II appointed him bishop of Sumbawanga, Tanzania on 21 April 1997. He was consecrated and installed at Nelson Mandela Stadium, Sumbawanga, Diocese of Sumbawanga on 29 June 1997. The Principal Consecrator was Archbishop Mario Epifanio Abdallah Mgulunde, Archbishop of Tabora assisted by Archbishop Polycarp Pengo, Archbishop of Dar-es-Salaam and Bishop Nestorius Timanywa, Bishop of Bukoba.

Bishop Damian Kyaruzi retired on 19 April 2018, the day Bishop Beatus Christian Urassa, his successor at Sumbawanga was appointed. He now lives on as Bishop Emeritus of Sumbawanga, Tanzania.

== See also ==
- Catholic Church in Tanzania

== Succession table ==
Catholic Church titles
Preceded by Charles Msakila (13 November 1958 - 23 February 1994)	Bishop of Sumbawanga (21 April 1997 - 19 April 2018)	Succeeded by Beatus Christian Urassa (since 19 April 2018)
