= Northern Mirkwood: The Wood-Elves Realm =

Fantasy role-playing game supplement

- Publishers: Iron Crown Enterprises
- Publication: 1983
- Genres: Role-playing
- Parent games: Middle-earth Role Playing
- ISBN: 978-0915795086

Northern Mirkwood: The Wood-Elves Realm is a 1983 fantasy role-playing game supplement published by Iron Crown Enterprises for Middle-earth Role Playing.

== Contents ==
Northern Mirkwood: The Wood-Elves Realm is a supplement that covers the lands depicted in the novel The Hobbit.

== Reception ==
Jonathan Sutherland reviewed Northern Mirkwood - The Wood-Elves Realm and Southern Mirkwood - Haunt of the Necromancer for White Dwarf #50, giving both an overall rating of 8 out of 10, and stated that "Both are rich in detail and are much more of a role-playing aid with numerous tables for random events and encounters."

Craig Sheeley reviewed Northern Mirkwood: The Wood-Elves Realm in The Space Gamer No. 73. Sheeley commented that "If you want a Tolkien-esque campaign, then Northern Mirkwood is an invaluable treatise. Unfortunately, for the [cost], you could get another Tolkien book."

Andy Blakeman reviewed Northern Mirkwood for Imagine magazine, and stated that "there is so much detail, and so many (often obscure) facts, that it would be a task of near-heroic dimensions to become thoroughly conversant with it all - and, indeed. I wouldn't recommend ICE products to anyone short of time or dedication."
