= Phantom of the Northern Marches =

Phantom of the Northern Marches is a 1986 role-playing game adventure published by Iron Crown Enterprises for Middle-earth Role Playing.

== Contents ==
Phantom of the Northern Marches is an adventure in which the setting is between Weathertop and the Trollshaws, and its three main scenarios revolve around tracking targets through harsh, unforgiving terrain.

== Publication history ==
Phantom of the Northern Marches was written by Graham Staplehurst, with a cover by Daniel Horne and illustrations by Stephan Peregrine, and was published by Iron Crown Enterprises in 1986 as a 32-page book.

Phantom of the Northern Marches was the first ready-to-run adventure module written by a British author, and follows the UK tradition of adaptable scenario design, allowing game masters to insert the adventure into any setting.

== Reception ==
Jon Sutherland reviewed Phantom of the Northern Marches for Adventurer magazine and stated that "Generally, Phantom is quite good, although it does not offer anything very original in scenario content."

== Reviews ==
- Dragon #125 (Sept., 1987)
- ZauberZeit (Issue 11 - Jul 1988)
