= River Running (Middle-earth Role Playing) =

River Running is a 1992 role-playing supplement for Middle-earth Role Playing published by Iron Crown Enterprises.

== Contents ==
River Running is a supplement in which the region around the Celduin is explored, with adventures set in Dorwinion.

== Reception ==
Herb Petro reviewed River Running in White Wolf #34 (Jan./Feb., 1993), rating it a 4 out of 5 and stated that "I was impressed that each adventure had extra play aids for instance, magic spell variations in the werewolf adventure, or charts explaining how many Orcs are drunk depending on when the PCs attack in another adventure."

== Reviews ==
- Other Hands (Issue 1 - Apr 1993)
