= Joseph Mlola =

Tanzanian Catholic bishop (born 1966)

The Right Reverend Joseph Roman Mlola ALCP/OSS
- Bishop of Kigoma
- Church: Catholic Church
- Archdiocese: Tabora
- Appointed: 10 July 2014
- Installed: 26 October 2014
- Predecessor: Protase Rugambwa

Orders
- Ordination: 12 July 1997
- Consecration: 26 October 2014 by Paul Runangaza Ruzoka

Personal details
- Born: 9 January 1966 (age 60) Mashati, Rombo, Tanzania
- Motto: Caritate, Unitas et Pax (Latin for 'Love, Unity and Peace')

Styles of Joseph Roman Mlola, ALCP/OSS
- Reference style: His Grace; The Right Reverend
- Spoken style: Your Grace
- Religious style: Bishop

Joseph Roman Mlola, ALCP/OSS (9 January 1966) is a Tanzanian Roman Catholic prelate who serves as Bishop of Kigoma since 2014.

== Background ==
Mlola was born on 9 January 1966 at Mashati Village, Rombo District, Kilimanjaro Region, in northeastern Tanzania.

== Priest ==
He was ordained priest on 12 July 1997. He is a member of the Apostolic Life Community of Priests in the Opus Spiritus Sancti, A.L.C.P./O.S.S. (Holy Spirit Fathers).

== Bishop ==
Mlola was appointed bishop of the Diocese of Kigoma on 10 July 2014 by Pope Francis and was consecrated bishop on 26 October 2014 at Kigoma. He was consecrated by the hands of Archbishop Paul Runangaza Ruzoka, Archbishop of Tabora, assisted by Archbishop Francisco Montecillo Padilla, the Papal Niucio to Tanzania at that time and Archbishop Protase Rugambwa, Bishop Emeritus of Kigoma.

== See also ==
- Roman Catholicism in Tanzania

Catholic Church titles
Preceded by Protase Rugambwa	Bishop of Kigoma; 2014–	Succeeded by Incumbent
