= Creatures of Middle-earth =

1987 supplement for Middle-earth Role Playing

Cover art by Angus McBride

Creatures of Middle-earth is a supplement published by Iron Crown Enterprises (I.C.E.) in 1988 for the fantasy role-playing game Middle-earth Role Playing (MERP), itself based on the works of J.R.R. Tolkien.

== Description ==
Creatures of Middle-earth is a bestiary that details all the creatures that have appeared in J.R.R. Tolkien's history of Middle-earth, as well as creatures created by I.C.E. in various MERP supplements.

The book first concentrates on animals, which are divided into eight families such as herbivores or flying creatures. If there are extraordinary examples of the animal, such as Gwaihir of the great eagles, they are given a full description.

The next section deals with monsters, again divided into eight groups such as dragons and undead. As with the section on animals, notable individuals such as Smaug are highlighted.

Various tables describe each of the above in MERP game terms, should the player characters ever encounter them.

== Publication history ==
I.C.E. acquired the license to publish games based on Tolkien's works from the Tolkien Estate in the early 1980s, and released MERP in 1984. This was followed by a large number of supplements, including a series of three books highlighting every named character that appears in Tolkien's Middle-earth works: Lords of Middle-earth, Volume I: The Immortals, Lords of Middle-earth, Volume II: The Mannish Races, and Lords of Middle-earth, Volume III: Hobbits, Dwarves, Ents, Orcs & Trolls. As a companion volume, I.C.E. published Creatures of Middle-earth in 1988, a 64-page softcover book created by Pete Fenlon, Ruth Sochard Pitt, and Jeff O'Hare with cover art by Angus McBride, and illustrations by Jim Holloway.

== Reception ==
In Issue 151 of Dragon (November 1989), Jim Bambra wrote, "Okay, Tolkien fans, [this is] for you! Full of background information on ... creatures of Middle-earth, it is a handy source of ideas for I.C.E.'s MERP game, other fantasy games, and lovers of Tolkien's creation."
