= Southern Mirkwood: Haunt of the Necromancer =

Tabletop role-playing game supplement

- Publishers: Iron Crown Enterprises
- Publication: 1983
- Genres: Role-playing
- Parent games: Middle-earth Role Playing
- ISBN: 9780915795093

Southern Mirkwood: Haunt of the Necromancer is a 1983 fantasy role-playing game supplement published by Iron Crown Enterprises for Middle-earth Role Playing.

== Contents ==
Southern Mirkwood: Haunt of the Necromancer is a campaign module which focuses on the stronghold of Dol Guldur, which Sauron inhabited while using the identity of the Necromancer.

== Reception ==
Jonathan Sutherland reviewed Northern Mirkwood - The Wood-Elves Realm and Southern Mirkwood - Haunt of the Necromancer for White Dwarf #50, giving both an overall rating of 8 out of 10, and stated that "Both are rich in detail and are much more of a role-playing aid with numerous tables for random events and encounters."

William A. Barton reviewed Southern Mirkwood: Haunt of the Necromancer in The Space Gamer No. 73. Barton commented that "A module for characters powerful and brave (or foolhardy) enough to challenge the Dark Lord in one of his lairs."
