= Rangers of the North: The Kingdom of Arthedain =

Rangers of the North: The Kingdom of Arthedain is a 1985 fantasy role-playing game supplement published by Iron Crown Enterprises for Middle-earth Role Playing.

== Contents ==
Rangers of the North is a supplement that details the Arthedain Kingdom, a region spanning from the Northlands tundra to the Shire of the hobbits.

== Reception ==
Andy Blakeman reviewed Rangers of the North for Imagine magazine, and stated that "All in all [...] a worthwhile addition to the Middle Earth range."

Rick Swan reviewed Rangers of the North in The Space Gamer No. 75. Swan commented that "considering how badly this could've been bungled, I.C.E. is to be commended for doing a bang-up job. And I'm betting we've yet to see the best. Until then, Rangers of the North ought to keep all would-be hobbits plenty happy."

== Reviews ==
- Jeux & Stratégie #54
