= Joseph Mashaka Triphon =

Tanzanian Catholic prelate (born 1962)

The Most Reverend Joseph Mashaka Triphon
- Bishop-Elect of Nzega, Tanzania
- Church: Catholic Church
- Archdiocese: Roman Catholic Archdiocese of Tabora
- See: Catholic Diocese of Nzega
- Appointed: 11 November 2026
- Installed: TBA

Orders
- Ordination: 27 May 1995
- Consecration: TBA
- Rank: Bishop

Personal details
- Born: Joseph Mashaka Triphon; 15 January 1962 (age 64) Tanzania

Styles of Joseph Mashaka Triphon
- Reference style: Your Lordship; The Most Reverend
- Spoken style: His Lordship
- Religious style: Bishop

Joseph Mashaka Triphon C.S.Sp. (born 15 January 1962), is a Tanzanian Catholic prelate who was appointed Bishop of the then newly-created Roman Catholic Diocese of Nzega, in Tanzania on 11 November 2026. Before that, from 27 May 1995 until 11 November 2026, he served as a priest of the Congregation of the Holy Spirit, a Catholic religious order. Pope Leo XIV appointed him bishop. His episcopal consecration is scheduled on a future date to be announced later.

== Early life and education ==
He was born on 15 November 1962, in Tanzania. He studied philosophy at the Spiritan Missionary Seminary in Arusha. He then studied theology at Tangaza University in Nairobi in neighboring Kenya. He undertook a pastoral placement in Papua New Guinea that lasted one year. From 1996 until 1998, he studied at the University of Strasbourg, in France, specialising in religious studies. He later studied at Lambeth College, in London, from 2010 until 2012, graduating with a certificate in counselling.

== Priest ==
He took his preliminary vows as member of the Congregation of the Holy Spirit on 19 July 1990. He then took his perpertual vows on 1 October 1994. He was ordained a priest on 27 May 1995. He served as priest until 11 November 2026. While a priest, he served in various capacities and locations, including:

- Head of youth and school ministry for the French Province of the Spiritans from 1995 until 2003.
- A course in Religious Science at the University of Strasbourg, France from 1996 until 1998.
- Treasurer of the East African Province of the Spiritans, based at the Provincial House in Tengeru, Arusha, Tanzania from 2003 until 2010.
- Studies at Lambeth College, London from 2010 until 2012, leading to the award of a certificate in counselling.
- Parish assistant at the parish of Virgin Mary Mother of Our Saviour in Kipawa, in the archdiocese of Dar es Salaam from 2012 until 2016.
- Director of the Libermann School in Kipawa, Dar es Salaam from 2012 until 2021.
- Parish priest of Kipawa and dean of the deanery of Segerea from 2016 until 2021.
- Parish priest of Our Lady Queen of Peace in Kasumo, in the diocese of Kigoma from 2021 until 2025.
- Dean and vicar for religious from 2021 until 2025.
- Parish priest of the Cathedral of the Immaculate Heart of Mary in the Diocese of Bagamoyo from 2025 until 2026.

== Bishop ==
On 11 November 2026, Pope Leo XIV created the Roman Catholic Diocese of Nzega, Tanzania, by taking territory from the Archdiocese of Tabora and making the new diocese a suffragan of that same metropolitan ecclesiastical province. That same day, The Holy Father appointed Reverend Father Joseph Mashaka Triphon, C.S.Sp. as the pioneer local ordinary of Nzega.

== See also ==
- Catholic Church in Tanzania

== Succession table ==
Catholic Church titles
Preceded by Position created	Bishop of Nzega (since 11 November 2026)	Succeeded by (Bishop-Elect)
