= Ghost Warriors =

Cover art by Angus McBride, 1990

Ghost Warriors is an adventure published by Iron Crown Enterprises (I.C.E.) in 1990 for the fantasy role-playing game Middle-earth Role Playing, which is itself based on the works of J.R.R. Tolkien.

== Contents ==
=== Background ===
In the Middle-earth Role Playing game, a people called the Daen Coentis ruled a kingdom on either side of the White Mountains at the end of the Second Age. They swore an oath of allegiance to Elendil and Isildur, but when called upon to join the Last Alliance against Sauron, they refused. The oath-breakers were cursed for their treachery, their spirits unable to depart from Middle Earth until they fulfilled their oath to the True King. As that generation died and became undead spirits, those still alive sought to escape the curse by moving away, into the southern reaches of the Misty Mountains, an area that became known as Dunland. Over the ages, the Dunlendings became implacable enemies of the Rohirrim, and in the time of The Lord of the Rings, were allies of the evil wizard Saruman.

In The Lord of the Rings, the Dunlendings join Saruman's army of orcs in an invasion of Rohan, but are defeated at the Battle of Helm's Deep.

=== Setting ===
In the 3,000 years of the Third Age between the first defeat of the Dark Lord Sauron by the Last Alliance of Elves and Men and the destruction of the One Ring, this book is set about the halfway point, in T.A. 1700, a few decades after a plague devastated all lands in this part of Middle Earth. A shaman of the Dunlendings has found a way to control the undead spirits of the Oathbreakers. Her plan is to build up her army of undead by kidnapping lone travellers, killing them and then raising them as wraiths.

== Plot summary ==
Ghost Warriors is a set of three connected scenarios that are set in Dunland.

1. "Ghost Warriors of Dunfearan": Undead have attacked a group of shepherds (and two children), have taken them prisoner, and are returning to their lair in the mountains. The local chieftain is looking for a party of adventurers to rescue to prisoners before they are taken into the lair.
2. "A Raid by Night": The undead have raided a merchant caravan, and although the caravaneers were able to flee, the caravan has been looted. The local chieftain wants a band of adventurers to sneak into an alternate underground entrance called the Riddle Caves and either assassinate the shaman in charge of the undead, or steal her staff that gives her power over her army.
3. "Intrigue in the Under-Deeps": A wealthy man offers to sponsor an expedition into the dark caves under the mountains for a quarter share of all the treasure that is brought back.

== Publication history ==
I.C.E. published the licensed game Middle Earth Role-Playing in 1982, and then released many supplements for it over the next 17 years, until the Tolkien Estate withdrew their license in 1999. Ghost Warriors was the 16th supplement to be published by I.C.E., a 48-page softcover book written by John M. Ferrone, with a cover by Angus McBride and illustrations by Liz Danforth.

== Reception ==
Herb Petro reviewed the product in the February–March 1991 issue of White Wolf. He stated that "Though this is by no means an original plot, these simple adventures are much better for being placed in Middle-Earth. The riddles are actually kind of clever and I do love the random passage generator." He rated it overall 3 out of a possible 5 points.
