= Isaac Amani Massawe =

Tanzanian Roman Catholic archbishop

The Most Reverend Isaac Amani Massawe
- Archbishop of Arusha
- Church: Roman Catholic Church
- Archdiocese: Arusha
- Province: Arusha
- Appointed: 27 December 2017
- Installed: 8 April 2018
- Predecessor: Josaphat Louis Lebulu
- Previous post: Bishop of Moshi (2007–2017)

Orders
- Ordination: 29 June 1975
- Consecration: 22 February 2008 by Cardinal Polycarp Pengo

Personal details
- Born: 10 June 1951 (age 75) Mango, Moshi, Tanzania
- Denomination: Roman Catholic
- Residence: Epiphany Parish, Burka, Arusha
- Education: St James Minor seminary (1966–1969); Ntungamo Major Seminary (1970–1972); Kipalapala Major Seminary (1972–1975); Walsh University, Ohio (1990–2003)
- Motto: Kuwajibika na Kushirikiana katika Kristo (English: responsible and cooperative in Christ)
- Coat of arms: Isaac Amani Massawe's coat of arms

Styles of Isaac Amani Massawe
- Coat of arms of Archbishop Isaac Amani Massawe
- Reference style: The Most Reverend
- Spoken style: Your Grace
- Religious style: Archbishop

Ordination history of Isaac Amani Massawe
History
Episcopal consecration
- Principal consecrator: Polycarp Cardinal Pengo, (Archbishop emeritus of Dar es Salaam)
- Co-consecrators: Josaphat Louis Lebulu (Archbishop emeritus of Arusha); Amedeus Msarikie (Moshi)

Isaac Amani Massawe (born 10 June 1951, in Mango) is the incumbent archbishop of the Roman Catholic Archdiocese of Arusha in Tanzania.

== Early life and ministry ==
Massawe was born at Mango in the Diocese of Moshi, Tanzania, on 10 June 1951.

He attended the diocesan minor seminary of St. James of Moshi from 1966 until 1969, studied philosophy at the major seminary of Ntungamo in the Diocese of Bukoba from 1970 until 1972, and theology at the major seminary of Kipalapala in the Archdiocese of Tabora (1972–1975).

He was consecrated priest on 29 June 1975.

Between 1986 and 1989 he was teacher and vice-rector of the diocesan minor seminary of San Giacomo di Moshi. From 1990 he studied at Walsh University in North Canton, in Ohio, graduating in 2003. During this period he exercised his ministry in several US parishes, and then moved to his homeland at the Cathedral of Christ the King of Moshi. Between 1999 and 2004 he was chaplain for the diocesan congregation of the Brothers of the Redeemer.

== Episcopal ministry ==
On 21 November 2007, he was appointed Bishop of Moshi by Pope Benedict XVI; he was ordained on 22 February 2008, by Cardinal Polycarp Pengo, the co-consecrators were Josaphat Louis Lebulu, metropolitan Archbishop of Arusha, and bishop Amedeus Msarikie, his predecessor in Moshi.

On 27 December 2017, he was appointed metropolitan Archbishop of Arusha by Pope Francis.

As chair of the governing board for Mwenge University College of Education, Massawe oversaw its transition to full University status in 2014, as Mwenge Catholic University, the second Catholic University in Tanzania.
