= Bernhard Bendel =

German catholic clergyman (1908–1980)

Bernhard Bendel (20 October 1908 – 19 January 1980) was a German Catholic clergyman. He was the founder of Opus Spiritus Sancti.

== Biography ==
Bernhard Bendel was born on 20 October 1908 in Steinefrenz, in the southern Westerwald. Bernhard was the eldest of eleven children of Heinrich Georg Bendel and his wife Katharina, née Michel. His father ran an inn and was also a farmer. After attending elementary school and receiving private Latin lessons, Bernhard was enrolled in the lower third grade of the high school in Hadamar, located in the Westerwald. After six years, Bernhard Bendel graduated with a high school diploma in 1928. He then began his studies at the Philosophical-Theological College of Sankt Georgen in Frankfurt am Main. On 8 December 1933 he was ordained as a priest at the Limburg Cathedral by Bishop Antonius Hilfrich. His first position as chaplain began on 21 March 1934, in Bad Schwalbach, and the second on 25 April 1936 in Geisenheim/Rheingau. From 1 July 1937 he served as coadjutor in Neuenhain, and from 1 May 1940 as chaplain in Hattersheim. On 1 June 1940 he was appointed parish curate and later became a parish priest in Mammolshain/Taunus.

On 28 May 1950, he founded the Opus Spiritus Sancti, an association of the faithful that brings together two societies of apostolic life and three secular institutes of diocesan right. He died in Mammolshain on 19 January 1980, under the care of the Sisters of the Holy Spirit.
