= Southern Gondor: The Land =

1996 role-playing game supplement

Cover art by Peter Fenlon

Southern Gondor: The Land is a supplement published by Iron Crown Enterprises (ICE) in 1996 for the fantasy role-playing game Middle-earth Role Playing (MERP), which is itself based on the works of J.R.R. Tolkien.

== Background ==
In Tolkien's published history of Middle Earth, the survivors of the Numenorean cataclysm, led by Elendil, settled in the land of Gondor. In Lord of the Rings, action is centered around the capital city of Minas Tirith, which lies in the northern part of Gondor; only passing mention is made of Southern Gondor.

== Description ==
Southern Gondor: The Land is the first in the "Lands of Middle-Earth" series of supplements that were meant to provide in-depth detail of each part of Middle-Earth. This book first covers the geography of Southern Gondor, then the local flora and fauna. Most of the book is taken up by a gazetteer that lists and describes all the place names of towns, villages, cities, rivers and other geographical features, and the history of each from its first habitation until the War of the Rings.

Special attention and detail is given for main towns and fortresses such as Pelargir, as well as ancient Elvish sites.

The book concludes with two mini-campaigns:

- "The Lost Endilmir": This series of adventures is set in the hear 1450 of the Third Age, just after the end of a fratricidal usurpation of the throne of Gondor known as the Kin-strife. The player characters must seek out the legendary Endilmir, a jewelled mithril circlet created thousands of years ago for the eldest daughter of the King of Numenor.
- "Rise of the Pretender": This series of adventures takes place in the year 1944 of the Third Age, when Gondor was fighting an incursion of people known as the Wainriders. The player characters must decide whether to work for or against an ambitious nobleman who yearns to take over the throne of Gondor.

== Publication history ==
ICE published the licensed role-playing game Middle Earth Role-Playing in 1982, and then released many supplements for it over the next 17 years. In 1996, ICE started two new series of supplements, "Lands of Middle-earth" and "People of Middle-earth". The plan was to produce a "Land" and a "People" supplement for every region of Middle Earth. The first supplement released was Southern Gondor: The Land, a 208-page softcover book that included 2 large double-sided maps. The book was created by Jason Beresford, Anders Blixt, Mats Blomqvist, Gunnar Brolin, Wesley J. Frank, Jeff Hatch, Jim Innes, James Owen, Erik Rågvik, Åke Rosenius, Martin Rundkvist, Chris Seeman, Magnus Seter, Jason Vester, and Patrick Wynne. Cover art was by Peter Fenlon, and interior art was by Salvatore Abbinanti, Tim Collier, Liz Danforth, Peter Fenlon, Christopher Miller, and Wayne Reynolds.

A companion supplement, Southern Gondor: The People, that described the people, society and social customs of the region was published simultaneously. These two books were followed later the same year by Arnor; The Land and Arnor: The People. However, no other books in the "Land" or "People" series were published, and in 1999, ICE had to discontinue publishing materials for MERP after the Tolkien Estate withdrew ICE's license.

== Reception ==
In Issue 9 of the UK magazine Arcane, Andy Butcher thought that "Combined with Southern Gondor: The People, there's more than enough background here for the referee to become an expert on every aspect of the area." However, Butcher cautioned that all of the information might not be necessary, saying, "Just how useful a lot of this detail is in gaming terms is somewhat debatable, although there's no denying that if it's authenticity you're after, you'll find it here." Butcher concluded by giving the book a rating of 6 out of 10.

Writing in Issue 97 of the French magazine Casus Belli, Anne Vétillard admired the "two beautiful color maps of excellent quality" that were included in the book. Vétillard also liked the variety of details given for each place listed on the maps, and the extensive plans and maps of fortresses. Vetillard wrote of the two Southern Gondor books that they were "a very fine ensemble, with a very rich background. They will satisfy both the knowledgeable Tolkienist and the gamemaster looking for a solid base for their campaign." She did note that gamemasters would have to purchase both books, pointing out, "They remain quite expensive, as it is difficult to do without one or the other volume if you want to fully exploit this famous region."

== Reviews ==
- Other Hands (Issue 14 - July 1996)
