= Ents of Fangorn =

Supplementary publication for the Middle-Earth Role Playing game

Cover art by Angus McBride, 1987

Ents of Fangorn is a supplement published by Iron Crown Enterprises in 1987 for Middle-earth Role Playing (MERP), a fantasy role-playing game based on J.R.R. Tolkien's The Lord of the Rings.

== Description ==
=== Background ===
In The Lord of the Rings, Ents are tree-like creatures who inhabit the forest of Fangorn, which lies between the citadel of Orthanc and the kingdom of Rohan. In Tolkien's masterwork, ents are instrumental in bringing about the downfall of the evil wizard Saruman.

=== Contents ===
Ents of Fangorn provides details of

- Ents, their history and culture
- The forest of Fangorn and other creatures of the forest
- Sites of interest, including the Derndingle of the Ents, a hold occupied by bandits, and a mine and cave system used by orcs
- The Ents' relationships with neighboring races — humans, elves, and orcs — who inhabit the borders of the forest

The book also includes six ideas for adventures set in the area, although all of them are set outside Fangorn.

== Publication history ==
ICE published the licensed game Middle Earth Role-Playing in 1982, and then released many supplements for it over the next 17 years, until the Tolkien Estate withdrew their license in 1999. Ents of Fangorn is a 48-page book designed by Randall Doty, with interior art by Liz Danforth and cover art by Angus McBride that includes two center-bound color maps.

== Reviews ==
In the August 1989 edition of Dragon (Issue #148), Jim Bambra thought that "Ents of Fangorn is a good example of how to portray monsters in an interesting style, while still staying true to the splendor and learned feel of Middle-earth." Bambra lauded the fact that in addition to material gleaned from Lord of the Rings, "further insights into ent life and culture are extrapolated from the available background. The supplement makes for interesting reading and portrays the ents as a deeply motivated race with an ancient history." But Bambra was less than impressed by the sample adventures, which largely involved exploring nearby orc lairs. "The dungeon descriptions are reminiscent of the early days of adventure design, when suitably tooled-up parties would raid the lairs of local monsters." Even for two sample adventures that involved ents, Bambra felt that they were "very skimpily outlined, giving no feel for how to handle encounters between PCs and ents. In fact, all of the adventure outlines are short on character interaction and role-playing." Bambra also felt that the setting, while beautifully described, was not used in the adventures at all, "a pity, as Fangorn Forest is a rich setting that, in the hands of a skilled adventure writer, would provide some memorable gaming sessions." He concluded, "As a book on ents, Ents of Fangorn has many uses outside of its MERP setting, but it would have benefited from more development, particularly in showing how this product could be used to stage and run adventures."
