= Henry Aloysius Gogarty =

Henry Aloysius Gogarty was an Irish priest in the Holy Ghost Fathers, who served in Eastern Africa, becoming a bishop.

Born in County Cavan, Ireland, on 9 September in 1884, Gogarty went to Rockwell College taking exams in the Royal University of Ireland joining the Holy Ghost order he went to the novitiate at Chevilly near Paris and was ordained at Paris in 1914 and was appointed to Zanzibar.

In 1923 Gogarty was appointed vicar apostolic to Kilimanjaro (now the Diocese of Moshi) and titular bishop Themiscyra, he was ordained a bishop in 1924 in Cobh, Co. Cork. In 1927 he was responsible for the foundation of the Congregation of Our Lady of Kilimanjaro.

Gogarty was treated at the Montana Sanatorium of the Congregation for his tuberculosis.

Gogarty returned in frail health to Montana, where he died on 8 December 1931.

Henry Gogarty secondary school in Arusha, Tanzania is named in his honor.

== Publications ==
- In the Land of the Kikuyus by Rev. Henry Aloysius Gogarty C.S.Sp., M.H. Gill & Son, 1920.
- Kilima-njaro: An East-African Vicariate, by Rev. Henry Aloysius Gogarty, New York : Society for the Propagation of the Faith, 1927.
