= Middle-earth Role Playing =

1984 Tabletop fantasy role-playing game

Middle-Earth Role Playing
A complete system for adventuring in J. R. R. Tolkien's World
- First edition rulebook cover
- Designers: Coleman Charlton
- Publishers: Iron Crown Enterprises
- Publication: 1984 First edition; 1986 Second edition; 1993 Collectors second edition
- Genres: Fantasy
- Systems: Streamlined Rolemaster
- ISBN: 0-915795-18-3

Middle-earth Role Playing (MERP) is a 1984 tabletop role-playing game based on J. R. R. Tolkien's The Lord of the Rings and The Hobbit. It was published under license from Tolkien Enterprises by Iron Crown Enterprises.

== System ==
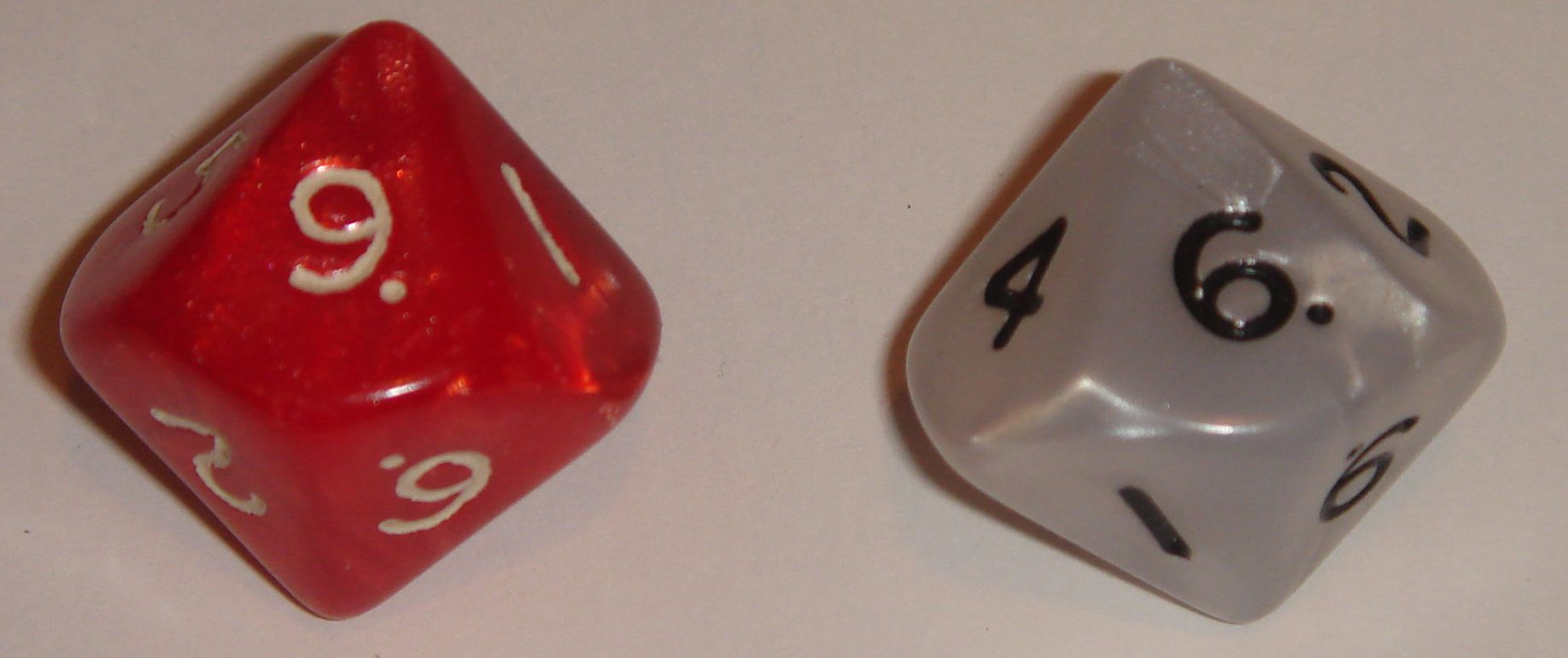
MERP uses two ten-sided dice

The rules system of the game is a streamlined version of Iron Crown Enterprises's (ICE) generic fantasy RPG, Rolemaster.

Characters have Attributes and Skills rated between 1 and 100 on a percentile die (d100) or two ten-sided dice (2d10). Skills can be modified to a rating above or below these limits (i.e. under 1 or over 100, with open-ended MERP options to add or subtract additional d100). An attack roll consists of a percentile roll, to which the attacker's skill rating and appropriate attribute rating are added and the defender's dodge rating is subtracted. The result is compared to the defender's armor type and looked up on a table to determine success or failure. A separate critical table is used in the initial chart result called for it.

Spellcasters learn lists of ten spells as a unit. Each of the spells is based on a theme (e.g. healing spells).

== History ==
ICE published the first edition of the MERP ruleset in 1984 and a second edition in 1986. A collector's edition was published in 1993, based upon the second edition with twice the number of pages. ICE was working on the third edition that was never published, along with many adventure and campaign modules, until Tolkien Enterprises revoked the license for games based on The Hobbit and The Lord of the Rings on 22 September 1999. ICE declared bankruptcy in 2000..

A related quarterly magazine, Other Hands Magazine, created by Chris Seeman to support the MERP community, was also required to desist by Tolkien Enterprises and ceased publication in 2001.

A second magazine, named Other Minds Magazine, created by Hawke Robinson (and named in recognition of the previous Other Hands quarterly, both about a quote from J. R. R. Tolkien's Letters) began publication in 2007. It also supports the role-playing community using ICE's MERP, Decipher's LotR, Cubicle 7's The One Ring Roleplaying Game, and other Tolkien-centric role-playing game systems.

In 1991-1993, ICE also published the Lord of the Rings Adventure Game. It used a simpler system than MERP and was intended to introduce new players to role-playing.

A UK edition was published by Games Workshop in 1985. It used the first edition rules, with a new box and booklet art by Chris Achilleos, along with 25mm floorplans for the sample adventure. Both the first and second edition ruleset and most of the adventure modules were translated for a German edition as Mittelerde-Rollenspiel (MERS) by Citadel Verlag, later Laurin Verlag, later Queen Games, starting in 1987. In Sweden a translated version called Sagan om Ringen: Rollspelet was released in 1986 by Target Games, followed by several translated modules. In Japan a translated version was released in 1987 by Hobby Japan. A Finnish language edition (Keski-Maa Roolipeli or KERP) was published in 1990. The first and second edition ruleset were translated for a French edition as Jeu de rôle des Terres du Milieu (JRTM) by Hexagonal, starting in 1986.

In the summer of 2005, a new annual convention began known as Merpcon (Middle-earth Role Playing Convention). It initially used the ICE MERP and ICE Rolemaster role-playing game systems.

== Supplements ==
=== First edition MERP supplements ===
- Angmar: Land of the Witch King (1982)
- A Campaign and Adventure Guidebook for Middle-earth (1982)
- Umbar: Haven of the Corsairs (1982)
- The Court of Ardor in Southern Middle Earth (1982)
- Isengard and Northern Gondor (1983)
- Northern Mirkwood: The Wood-Elves Realm (1983)
- Southern Mirkwood: Haunt of the Necromancer (1983)
- Bree and the Barrow-Downs (1984)
- Combat Screen and Reference Sheets (1984)
- Dagorlad and the Dead Marshes (1984)
- Hillmen of the Trollshaws (1984)
- Moria: The Dwarven City (1984)
- The Tower of Cirith Ungol and Shelob's Lair (1984)
- Erech and the Paths of the Dead (1985)
- Goblin-Gate and Eagle's Eyrie (1985)
- Haunted Ruins of the Dundlendings (1985)
- Rangers of the North: The Kingdom of Arthedain (1985)
- Riders of Rohan (1985)
- Lords of Middle-earth, Volume I (1986)
- Lórien & The Halls of the Elven Smiths (1986)
- Phantom of the Northern Marches (1986)
- Thieves of Tharbad (1986)
- Trolls of the Misty Mountains (1986)
- Assassins of Dol Amroth (1987)
- Brigands of Mirkwood (1987)
- Dunland and the Southern Misty Mountains (1987)
- Ents of Fangorn (1987)
- Gates of Mordor (1987)
- Havens of Gondor ... Land of Belfalas (1987)
- Lords of Middle-earth, Volume II (1987)
- Lost Realm of Cardolan (1987)
- Pirates of Pelargir (1987)
- Rivendell: The House of Elrond (1987)
- Sea-Lords of Gondor ... Pelargir and Lebennin (1987)
- Weathertop, Tower of the Wind (1987)
- Woses of the Black Wood (1987)
- Creatures of Middle-earth: A Bestiary of Animals and Monsters (1988)
- Far Harad, the Scorched Land (1988)
- Halls of the Elven-King (1988)
- Minas Tirith (1988)
- Mirkwood: The Wilds of Rhovanion (1988)
- Mouths of the Entwash (1988)
- Raiders of Cardolan (1988)
- Shadow in the South (1988)
- Teeth of Mordor (1988)
- Dark Mage of Rhudaur (1989)
- Denizens of the Dark Wood (1989)
- Empire of the Witch-King (1989)
- Forest of Tears (1989)
- Ghosts of the Southern Anduin (1989)
- Lords of Middle-earth, Volume III (1989)
- Middle-earth Adventure Guidebook II (1989)
- Mount Gundabad (1989)
- Perils on the Sea of Rhûn (1989)
- Treasures of Middle-Earth (1989)
- Warlords of the Desert (1989)
- Angus McBride's Characters of Middle-earth (1990)
- Calenhad, a Beacon of Gondor (1990)
- Ghost Warriors (1990)
- Gorgoroth (1990)
- Greater Harad (1990)
- Hazards of the Harad Wood (1990)
- Rogues of the Borderlands (1990)
- The Necromancer's Lieutenant (1990)
- Minas Ithil (1991)
- Nazgûl's Citadel (1991)
- River Running (1992)
- The Grey Mountains (1992)

=== Second edition MERP supplements ===
- Northwestern Middle-earth Gazetteer 2nd Edition (1992)
- Middle-earth Role Playing Campaign Guide 2nd Edition (1993)
- Valar & Maiar (1993)
- Arnor (1994)
- Creatures of Middle-earth (1994)
- Elves (1994)
- Middle-earth Role Playing Poster Maps (1994)
- Middle-earth Role Playing 2nd Edition Accessory Pack (1994)
- Minas Tirith (1994)
- Northwestern Middle-earth Map Set (1994)
- Palantír Quest (1994)
- Treasures of Middle-earth (1994)
- Moria (1994)
- Angmar (1995)
- Dol Guldur (1995)
- Lake-Town (1995)
- Mirkwood (1995)
- The Kin-Strife (1995)
- The Shire (1995)
- Arnor - The People (1996)
- Southern Gondor: The Land (1996)
- Southern Gondor: The People (1996)
- Arnor - The Land (1997)
- Hands of the Healer (1997)
- The Northern Waste (1997)

== Critical reception ==
In the February 1984 edition of White Dwarf (Issue 50), Jonathan Sutherland reviewed the various MERP supplements available at the time, and generally liked them, although he found their price a bit steep.

A few issues later, in the October 1984 edition of White Dwarf (Issue 58), Sutherland reviewed the main rules system of MERP and thought that it "mirrors the consistently high-quality one has come to expect from ICE." Sutherland concluded that it "is a well-conceived, reasonably well-written system. I can't say it's easy and ideal for beginners but I can honestly recommend that you try it. MERP gets my vote as best new RPG this year; in fact I've not been so impressed since I first read Call of Cthulhu."

In Issue 29 of Abyss, Eric Olson liked the emerging MERP line, pointing out "ICE has gone full tilt into adapting Tolkien for fantasy role playing. Without a doubt, ICE is developing some of the best graphics in the business. Their maps are beautiful." Olson concluded, "ICE is on the rise, and has built a solid base, and I am more and more impressed with them with each new product."

In the March–April 1985 edition of Space Gamer (Issue No. 73), William A. Barton commented that "If you haven't yet taken a trip to Middle-earth via the Iron Crown, I recommend you remedy the situation as soon as possible."

In the January 1985 edition of Imagine (Issue 22), Andy Blakeman stated that "by its links with Tolkien, it cannot fail to attract many new gamers into this hobby; and I am reasonably confident that these newcomers will not be disappointed."

In the June 1985 edition of White Dwarf (Issue 66), Graham Staplehurst thought "Iron Crown has done superb development work on areas that Tolkien neglected or left unspecified." He found the rules system suitable "though not spectacularly original", and the combat system "can be rather bloody, which is no bad thing." However, Staplehurst had issues with the magic system, pointing out that in Tolkien's books, magic is a rare, subtle force only used by a few powerful characters, whereas "The MERP system gives these sorts of powers to almost anyone after the acquisition of relatively few experience points; for me, it upsets the flavor of the game and its authenticity." He concluded, "MERP can be used to recreate the great adventures of which Tolkien wrote: going with Frodo or Bilbo or Beren into the lair of evil and trying to escape alive, and it can go some way to fulfilling the desires of people who want to know more about Tolkien's world."

In the January 1987 edition of White Dwarf (Issue 83), Graham Staplehurst reviewed the second edition of the rules and applauded ICE for including more material for newcomers, such as an introductory booklet and a short introductory adventure. He also liked the rearrangement of rules, pointing out that "Much of the confusion of tables, lists, and rules has been cleared by a sensible grouping of charts onto single pages and into a larger batch on the rear of the book." He concluded, "MERP remains (for me) one of the more inventive and enjoyable roleplaying game currently available."

Jonathan Tweet reviewed Middle-Earth Role Playing for Different Worlds magazine and stated that "most gamers are not purists like me. MERP can be played as it is if you do not mind a compromise between Tolkien's genius and role-playing habits. It is a complete, workable system that can be expanded both with MERP game aids and the more complex Rolemaster rules. Whether you want to add your sword to the side of the Free Peoples in their desperate war with Sauron or just want to kill some honest-to-Tolkien Orcs for a change, this could be the game for you."

In his 1990 book The Complete Guide to Role-Playing Games, game critic Rick Swan didn't think that MERP successfully recreated Tolkien's Midde-earth setting. For that reason, Swan thought that the game was "more likely to find favor with casual Tolkien fans than Middle Earth fanatics, because even though it's a pretty good fantasy game, it doesn't measure up to the novels." Swan concluded by giving this game a rating of 2.5 out of 4.

Herb Petro reviewed Middle-earth Role Playing, Second Edition in White Wolf #49 (Nov., 1994), rating it a 4 out of 5 and stated that "For a hardback rulebook of this size, the price is very reasonable. This edition is billed as a collector's, which implies that a less-expensive paperbound printing will be available in the future. I recommend the hardback, not only because of its sturdiness, but so you can immediately embark on the roleplaying adventure of a lifetime."

In a 1996 readers poll taken by the British games magazine Arcane to determine the 50 most popular role-playing games of all time, Middle-earth Role Playing was ranked 11th. Editor Paul Pettengale commented: "The popularity of the books, we would suggest, explains why the game based on Tolkien's world is so popular. The system is overly complicated (being based on the complex Rolemaster system - see number 15), and it suffers from the problem of timing. For example, at which time do you set your campaign? Set it before The Lord of the Rings and everyone knows what's going to happen, set it after The Lord of the Rings and you've got to make a whole load of stuff up. Still, the supplements are all good, if you get off on bucketfuls of detail and polished prose. Not for everyone, sure, but die-hard Tolkien fans should check it out."

In a retrospective review of Middle-earth Role Playing in Black Gate, Scott Taylor said "MERP, as it is more affectionately called, became the second leading RPG sold in the 1980s, and although mismanagement and rather daunting licensing dealings with the Tolkien estate finally resulted in the games dissolution and the company's bankruptcy, the body of work put out by I.C.E. in a little over a decade remains the Middle-Earth canon for all role-players who truly take the genre seriously." Taylor also commented on the maps of the game in 2014, "There is, and unfortunately never will be again, an astoundingly beautiful game like MERP that has kept gamers coming back for over thirty years. Frankly, if you ever intend to play in Middle-Earth I suggest these books being your basis".

In his 2023 book Monsters, Aliens, and Holes in the Ground, RPG historian Stu Horvath noted, "MERP is a glorious mess. The ruleset, the sourcebooks, all of it — mess ... the system Iron Crown offered feels radically out of sync with the themes and aesthetics of Tolkien's world." However, Horvath felt the game had positive values, commenting, "MERP books aren't trash. They conjure a world in vivid, exacting detail. It may often feel like fan fiction, but it is so internally consistent that it is difficult not to love."
