= The Grey Mountains =

The Grey Mountains is a 1992 role-playing supplement for Middle-earth Role Playing published by Iron Crown Enterprises.

== Contents ==
The Grey Mountains is a supplement in which the 400-mile mountain range of the Grey Mountains is detailed.

== Reception ==
Herb Petro reviewed The Grey Mountains in White Wolf #34 (Jan./Feb., 1993), rating it a 3 out of 5 and stated that "Not only are the history, nature, and abilities of Dragons in Tolkien's mythos outlines, but descriptions of 20 of the beasts are provided, allowing insight into the powerful individual personalities of these evil creatures."
