= Hillmen of the Trollshaws =

- Author: Jeff McKeagle
- Illustrator: Gail B. McIntosh; Stephen Peregrine
- Publisher: Iron Crown Enterprises
- Publication date: 1984
- ISBN: 0915795248

Hillmen of the Trollshaws is a supplement published by Iron Crown Enterprises in 1984 for the fantasy role-playing game Middle-earth Role Playing (MERP), itself based on The Lord of the Rings (LotR) by J.R.R. Tolkien.

== Background ==
During Tolkien's Third Age, the north kingdom of Arnor was divided into three smaller Dunedain kingdoms, Arthedain, Cardolan and Rhudaur. All of them eventually fell to the Witch-King of Angmar, and the hills of Rhudaur became infested with evil trolls, an area called the Trollshaws. Bilbo Baggins would run into some of these trolls in The Hobbit.

== Contents ==
Hillmen of the Trollshaws is a supplement set in Rhudaur in the time after its destruction. The book gives the geography, ecology, flora and fauna of the region, and describes the ruins of small towers and fortifications still standing, as well as the elven home of Rivendell.

Three adventures take place in the Third Age, when Rhudaur lies in forgotten ruins:

- "The Secret Troll Lair": Adventurers hear that a troll family has taken a prisoner.
- "The Tale of Mong-Finn and Miffli": Hillmen have taken over the old tower of Cameth Brin, and adventurers are needed to clear them out.
- "The Rescue of Alquawen": Princess Alquawen of Arthedain has been kidnapped and carried off to Cameth Brin in Rhudaur.

A fourth adventure is set in the Fourth Age, after the fall of Sauron:

- "Cleansing Cameth Brin": Leegrash the Uruk and his followers have escaped from the fall of Mordor, and have taken over the abandoned fortress of Cameth Brin. King Elessar wishes for the old fortresses of Rhudaur to be cleansed of all evil creatures.

== Publication history ==
Tolkien Enterprises granted an exclusive, worldwide license to ICE in 1982 to create and market role-playing games based on LotR. ICE quickly developed Middle-earth Role Playing, and then developed a long line of source books dealing with various geographical areas of Middle-earth. One of these was Hillmen of the Trollshaws, a 36-page book designed by Jeff McKeagle, with cover art by Gail B. Mcintosh, and interior art by Stephen Peregrine, published by ICE in 1984.

== Reception ==
In Issue 32 of Abyss, Dave Nalle noted "Hillmen treats a less familiar setting, and does it rather well. The scenarios provided are all fairly good with nice variety." Nalle concluded, "On the whole, this package seems interesting and playable, and offers room for originality and inventiveness."

In the British RPG magazine Imagine, Andy Blakeman stated "Hillmen of the Trollshaws features Cameth Brin, a fortress built into a rocky outcrop, which protects a deserted town in its shadow. Explorations of Cameth Brin are obviously called for, and who could refuse the challenge?"

In The Space Gamer No. 76, J. Michael Caparula commented that "I found Hillmen of the Trollshaws to be a good value for [the price]. if you use the 'Trollshaws' adventure in the original MERP rules as a jumping-off point, you'll find this module useful for continuing the campaign in the same area. Cameth Brin is a worthy enough conception to be used in any fantasy campaign, MERP or otherwise."
