= Angus McBride's Characters of Middle-earth =

Role-playing game supplement

Angus McBride's Characters of Middle-earth is a game supplement published by Iron Crown Enterprises (I.C.E.) in 1990 for their Middle-earth Role Playing (MERP) fantasy game system that is based on J. R. R. Tolkien's The Lord of the Rings.

== Contents ==
Angus McBride's Characters of Middle-earth is a collection of 29 paintings by South African artist Angus McBride of important characters from The Lord of the Rings such as Gandalf, Treebeard, and Galadriel, as well as characters from MERP sourcebooks. Each painting is printed in full-color on glossy paper, and comes with a description of the character and the place portrayed in the painting, along with game statistics for the character.

== Reception ==
Herb Petro reviewed Angus McBride's Characters of Middle-earth in White Wolf #25 (Feb./March, 1991), rating it a 2 out of 5 and stated that "This book is for those who revel in the glories of Middle-Earth, art enthusiasts who don't follow ICE's MERP line, MERP enthusiasts who don't have all the now out of print MERP products bhut still would like to enjoy the cover art from those products, and even those who have these prints on the covers of their MERP collection but would like to see the full paintings without the title and staples occluding some of the print. Even though this book is nearly totally useless as a game supplement, its value as a visual aid to certain important scenes makes it a welcome addition to my collection."

In the August 1991 edition of Dragon (Issue #172), Allen Varney was a self-described fan of Angus McBride's art, calling him "my favorite of the legions of illustrators of J.R.R. Tolkien's works." Varney described this release as a "pristine book of fine art"; but gave a thumbs down for the "feeble gaming filler facing each painting." Varney advised readers to "Skip the game junk and frame these vivid visualizations." He also criticized the dearth of subjects taken from Tolkien's work, and the overabundance of "covers from all those [MERP] supplements about Near Harad, Far Harad, Really Far Boring Harad, and other backwaters that barely rate footnotes in The Lord of the Rings."
