= Assassins of Dol Amroth =

1987 tabletop game adventure

Assassins of Dol Amroth is a 1987 tabletop game adventure published by Iron Crown Enterprises for Middle-earth.

== Plot summary ==
Assassins of Dol Amroth is an adventure in which three linked adventures are set around the Gondorian principality of Dol Amroth, in which the player characters hunt a murderer, survive an assassins' revenge plot, and ultimately assault the assassins' hidden stronghold.

== Publication history ==
Assassins of Dol Amroth was written by Charles Crutchfield, with a cover by Angus McBride, and illustrations by Jeff Menges and published by Iron Crown Enterprises in 1987 as a 32-page book.

== Reviews ==
- G.M. #1
- Fantasywelt (Issue 24 - 1989)

== See also ==
- Card game
- Board game
