= Matthew Shija =

- Bishop Emeritus of Diocese of Kahama Emeritus
- Church: Roman Catholic Church
- See: Roman Catholic Diocese of Kahama
- In office: 1983-2001
- Predecessor: none
- Successor: Ludovic Minde

Orders
- Ordination: 17 January 1954

Personal details
- Born: 17 April 1924; Puge, Tanzania
- Died: 9 December 2015 (aged 91)

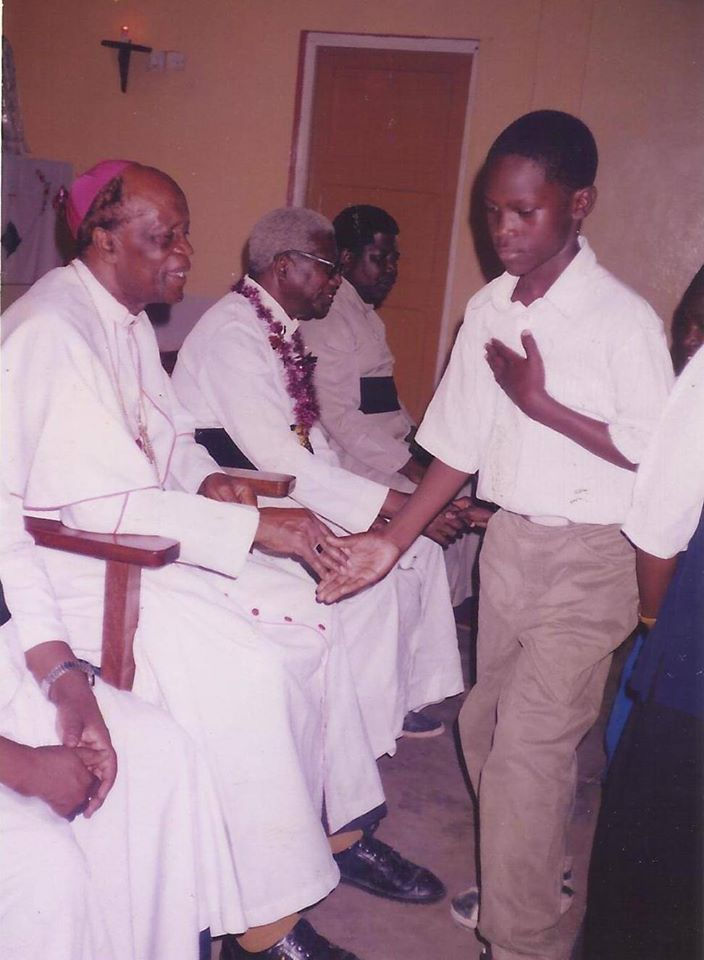
Bishop Matthew Shija greeting a child (Samson Aloyce) after first communion in 1998). from left to right is Late Rev. Bishop Matthew Shija, in the middle is the late Rev Joseph Manoja and in the right side is Rev Isaya Bahati

Bishop Emeritus Matthew Shija (17 April 1924 – 9 December 2015) was a Tanzanian prelate of the Catholic Church. Shija was born in Puge, Tanzania and was ordained a priest on 17 January 1954. Shija was appointed bishop of the Diocese of Kahama on 11 November 1983 and was ordained bishop on 26 February 1984. Shija served until his retirement on 24 April 2001, having reached the Age limit as described by the Code of Canon Law.
