= Amedeus Msarikie =

Tanzanian Roman Catholic bishop

- Bishop of Moshi
- Church: Catholic Church
- Diocese: Diocese of Moshi
- In office: 21 March 1986 – 21 November 2007
- Predecessor: Joseph Sipendi
- Successor: Isaac Amani Massawe

Orders
- Ordination: 8 August 1961
- Consecration: 1 May 1986 by Jozef Tomko

Personal details
- Born: September 1931 Kirua, mandatory Tanganyika Territory, British Empire
- Died: 7 February 2013 (aged 81)

Amedeus Msarikie (September 1931 – 7 February 2013) was the Roman Catholic bishop of Moshi, Tanzania.

Ordained to the priesthood in 1961, Msarikie was named bishop in 1986 and retired in 2007.
