= Minas Tirith (MERP) =

1988 role-playing game supplement

Cover art by Angus McBride

Minas Tirith is a sourcebook published by Iron Crown Enterprises (ICE) in 1988 as part of its series "Cities of Middle-earth". The book provides details about the city of Minas Tirith for use with the game Middle-earth Role Playing (MERP), itself based on the epic trilogy Lord of the Rings by J.R.R. Tolkien.

== Description ==
Minas Tirith provides MERP gamemasters with details of the history of the city, as well as prominent citizens, the geography of the city and its surrounding lands, key locations, society, commerce, and politics. Descriptions of important personalities from Lord of the Rings include Boromir, Faramir, and Denethor. Five scenarios are included in the book.

== Publication history ==
ICE gained the license to produce a Lord of the Rings role-playing game from the Tolkien estate in 1984, and subsequently created MERP. The game proved popular, and ICE created many sourcebooks for the game that detailed various areas mentioned or visited in Lord of the Rings. In 1988, ICE released the first in a two-volume "Cities of Middle-earth" series, Minas Tirith, a 170-page hardcover book created by Graham Staplehurst, with cover art by Angus McBride, interior art by Liz Danforth, Shawn Sharp and Jason Waltrip, and cartography by Carolyn Savoy and Peter Fenlon. A second edition was released in 1994.

The second volume, Minas Ithil, was published in 1992. ICE continued to produce sourcebooks for MERP until the Tolkien estate abruptly revoked the license in 1999. ICE went bankrupt the following year.

== Reception ==
In the October 1988 issue of Games International, Paul Mason noted all of the meticulous detail included in the book, commenting, "One might even suggest that there is too much detail in the pack, and wading through it could drive a busy referee to distraction." Mason suggested that this material need not be limited to MERP, noting, "a colourful map, and the level of detail makes Minas Tirith a good choice for insertion into [any] fantasy campaign. Because it is based on such a famous setting it has a coherence and atmosphere lacking from many [other] city products. "

In Issue 55 of the French games magazine Casus Belli, Pierre Rosenthal called this book "One of the most beautiful supplements published to date. In this hardcover, you will find everything you need to know about the capital of Gondor, the plans of several dozen important buildings and inexhaustible scenario sources." Rosenthal concluded by calling it "One hundred and sixty pages of happiness."

In Issue 156 of Dragon (April 1990), Ken Rolston called book author Graham Staplehurst "the best of the free-lance writer-designers working with Iron Crown" and went on to say "In Minas Tirith, Staplehurst has skillfully exploited both his historical and literary sources to produce a fantasy city setting with the necessary realistic and plausible foundations. He also has maintained the coherent and dignified tone appropriate to his Tolkien sources." However, Rolston found some of the illustrations and floor plans of important Tolkien buildings "crude and unconvincing by comparison to the illustrations and floor plans of buildings based on historical models." Swan was also unconvinced about the included adventures, noting, "The adventures are satisfactory but only modestly successful in exploiting the greater virtues of the supplement." Rolston concluded, "Minas Tirith earns top honors in sense of time, place, and culture, with strong conceptions for its historical, imaginative, and literary sources. In other areas, it merits above-average scores with few objectionable flaws ... It is most useful for GMs with high-fantasy campaigns, and less useful for more common low-fantasy and action-adventure FRPG campaigns."

== Reviews ==
- Australian Realms #4
- Backstab #21
- G.M. The Independent Fantasy Roleplaying Magazine #2
