= Protase Rugambwa =

Tanzanian prelate of the Catholic Church (born 1960)

His Eminence Protase Rugambwa
- Cardinal, Metropolitan Archbishop of Tabora
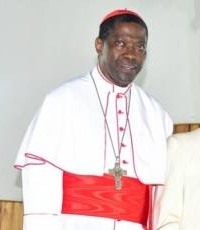
- Rugambwa in 2023.
- Church: Catholic Church
- Archdiocese: Tabora
- See: Tabora
- Appointed: 13 April 2023 (coadjutor)
- Installed: 10 November 2023
- Predecessor: Paul R. Ruzoka
- Other post: Cardinal Priest of Santa Maria in Montesanto (2023–)
- Previous posts: Vicar General of Rulenge (2002-04); Bishop of Kigoma (2008-12); Adjunct Secretary of the Congregation for the Evangelization of Peoples (2012-17); President of the Pontifical Mission Societies (2012-17); Secretary of the Congregation for the Evangelization of Peoples (2017–23); Vice-Grand Chancellor of the Pontifical Urbaniana University (2017–23)

Orders
- Ordination: 2 September 1990 by Pope John Paul II
- Consecration: 13 April 2008 by Polycarp Pengo
- Created cardinal: 30 September 2023 by Pope Francis
- Rank: Cardinal-Priest

Personal details
- Born: 31 May 1960 (age 66) Bunena, Tanzania
- Education: Pontifical Lateran University
- Motto: Euntes in Mundum Universum ("Go into the whole world")
- Coat of arms

Styles of Protase Rugambwa
- Reference style: His Eminence
- Spoken style: Your Eminence
- Religious style: Cardinal
- Informal style: Cardinal

Protase Rugambwa (born 31 May 1960) is a Tanzanian prelate of the Catholic Church who has been metropolitan archbishop of the Archdiocese of Tabora since November 2023, after serving as coadjutor there for seven months. He was a secretary of the Congregation for the Evangelization of Peoples from November 2017 to April 2023. He previously served as that congregation's adjunct secretary and president of the Pontifical Mission Societies from 2012 to 2017. Pope Francis made him a cardinal on 30 September 2023.

== Biography ==
Protase Rugambwa was born on 31 May 1960 at Bunena, in the diocese of Bukoba. He had an elder brother, Paulo Kishumba (1957-2021). He was given the name "Rugambwa" after Laurean Rugambwa, who had become Tanzania's first cardinal a few weeks earlier. After attending primary and secondary schools and Minor Seminary Katoke Itaga, Rugambwa studied philosophy at Kibosho Senior Seminary and theology at St. Charles Lwanga Segerea Senior Seminary.

He was ordained a priest for the Diocese of Rulenge on 2 September 1990 in Dar-es-Salaam by Pope John Paul II during his pastoral visit to Tanzania.

He was parish vicar of Mabira for 1990-91. He taught at the Minor Seminary of Katoke from 1991 to 1994, with responsibility for the liturgy and serving also as chaplain of Biharamulo hospital. From 1994 to 1998 he pursued a doctorate in pastoral theology at the Pontifical Lateran University. Returning to Tanzania, he was spiritual director of seminarians and director of vocations for the Diocese of Rulenge and executive director of the pastoral care department for 1998-99. From 2000 to 2002 he was Vicar General of the diocese of Rulenge and moderator of personnel. He worked in Rome on the staff of the Congregation for the Evangelization of Peoples from 2002 to 2008.

On 18 January 2008, Pope Benedict XVI appointed Rugambwa bishop of the Diocese of Kigoma, Tanzania. He received his episcopal consecration on 13 April from Cardinal Polycarp Pengo, Archbishop of Dar-es-Salaam.

On 26 June 2012, Pope Benedict appointed him adjunct secretary of the Congregation for the Evangelization of Peoples and president of the Pontifical Mission Societies, replacing Archbishop Piergiuseppe Vacchelli, who had reached retirement age. He was given the personal title of archbishop at the same time. Pope Francis confirmed him as adjunct secretary on 21 September 2013.

On 9 November 2017, Pope Francis promoted him to secretary of the Congregation.

On 13 April 2023, Pope Francis named him archbishop coadjutor of Tabora.

On 9 July 2023, Pope Francis announced the plans to make him a cardinal at a consistory scheduled for 30 September. At that consistory he was made cardinal priest of Santa Maria in Montesanto.

On 10 November 2023, he became archbishop of Tabora upon the resignation of Paul R. Ruzoka.

He participated as a cardinal elector in the 2025 papal conclave that elected Pope Leo XIV.

== Publication ==
Protase Rugambwa: Ministry and collaboration in small Christian communities: ″Communities in Rulenge Diocese-Tanzania, a case study", dissertation, Pontificia Università Lateranense, Rome, 1998.

== See also ==
- Cardinals created by Francis
- Laurean Rugambwa

Catholic Church titles
Preceded by Paul R. Ruzoka	Bishop of Kigoma; 18 January 2008 – 26 June 2012	Succeeded by Joseph Roman Mlola
Preceded by Piergiuseppe Vacchelli	Adjunct Secretary of the Congregation for the Evangelization of Peoples; 26 June 2012 - 9 November 2017	Succeeded by Giovanni Pietro Dal Toso
Preceded by Paul R. Ruzoka	Archbishop of Tabora; 2023-	Incumbent
