= Bree and the Barrow-Downs =

Role-playing game adventure

- Publishers: Iron Crown Enterprises
- Publication: 1984
- Genres: Role-playing
- Parent games: Middle-earth Role Playing
- ISBN: 9780915795161

Bree and the Barrow-Downs is a 1984 fantasy role-playing game adventure published by Iron Crown Enterprises for Middle-earth Role Playing.

== Contents ==
Bree and the Barrow-Downs is an adventure module that takes place in the village of Bree and the Barrow-downs that can be found nearby.

== Publication history ==
Shannon Appelcline commented that "There were 15 actual adventure modules published in MERP's original adventure line, from Bree and the Barrow-Downs (1984) to Dark Mage of Rhuduar (1989), but up until 1987 these read more like small-focus setting books, with a few (usually very short) adventures thrown in."

== Reception ==
Jon Sutherland reviewed Bree and the Barrow-Downs for White Dwarf #58, giving it an overall rating of 6 out of 10, and stated that "The Barrow Downs present only a smash and grab basis for scenarios, even then you would need a small army to get out alive! The colour maps are useful, though."

Andy Blakeman reviewed Bree and the Barrow Downs for Imagine magazine, and stated that "Bree and the Barrow Downs is my favourite; the degree of characterisation in the descriptions of the inhabitants of Bree-land is heartening, and the Barrows themselves provide an interesting bit of adventure."

William A. Barton reviewed Bree and the Barrow-Downs in The Space Gamer No. 73.
