= Diocese of Kahama =

Roman Catholic diocese in Tanzania, Africa

Coordinates: 3.8326°S 32.6084°E

Diocese of Kahama Dioecesis Kahamaënsis

Location
- Country: Tanzania
- Metropolitan: Tabora

Statistics
- Area: 19,946 km^{2} (7,701 sq mi)
- Population: Total; Catholics: (as of 2004); 1,139,933; 112,579 (9.9%)

Information
- Rite: Latin Rite

Current leadership
- Pope: Leo XIV
- Bishop: Christopher Ndizeye Nkoronko

The Roman Catholic Diocese of Kahama (Latin: Dioecesis Kahamaënsis) is a diocese located in Kahama in the ecclesiastical province of Tabora in Tanzania.

== History ==
- November 11, 1983: Established as Diocese of Kahama from the Metropolitan Archdiocese of Tabora

== Leadership ==
- Bishops of Kahama (Roman rite)
  - Bishop Matthew Shija (November 11, 1983 – April 24, 2001)
  - Bishop Ludovic Minde, O.S.S. (April 24, 2001 – December 2, 2019), appointed Bishop of Moshi
  - Bishop Christopher Ndizeye Nkoronko (since 23 June 2022)

== See also ==
- Roman Catholicism in Tanzania

== Sources ==
- Catholic Hierarchy Information
