= Diocese of Moshi =

Roman Catholic diocese in Tanzania, Africa

Coordinates: 3.334883°S 37.340381°E

Diocese of Moshi Dioecesis Moshiensis

Location
- Country: Tanzania
- Metropolitan: Arusha

Statistics
- Area: 5,029 km^{2} (1,942 sq mi)
- Population: Total; Catholics: (as of 2004); 881,376; 575,249 (65.3%)

Information
- Denomination: Catholic
- Sui iuris church: Latin Church
- Rite: Latin Rite
- Cathedral: Christ the King Cathedral, Moshi
- Patron saint: Christ The King

Current leadership
- Pope: Leo XIV
- Bishop: Ludovick Joseph Minde, ALCP/OSS

The Roman Catholic Diocese of Moshi (Latin: Dioecesis Moshiensis) is a diocese located in the town of Moshi in the ecclesiastical province of Arusha in Tanzania. The Diocese stretches along the slopes and low plains of volcanic mountain Kilimanjaro, covering an area of 5,029 sq Km. The Diocese of Moshi was officially inaugurated on March 25, 1953.

== History ==
- September 13, 1910: Established as Apostolic Vicariate of Kilima-Njaro from the Apostolic Vicariate of Bagamoyo
- March 25, 1953: Promoted as Diocese of Moshi

== Special churches ==
The Cathedral is Christ the King Cathedral in Moshi.

== Bishops ==
=== Ordinaries ===
- Vicars Apostolic of Kilima-Njaro (Roman rite)
  - Bishop Marie-Joseph-Aloys Munsch, C.S.Sp. (1910.09.13 – 1922.01.16)
  - Bishop Henry Aloysius (Enrico) Gogarty, C.S.Sp. (1923.11.28 – 1931.12.08)
  - Bishop Joseph James Byrne, C.S.Sp. (1932.11.29 – 1953.03.25); see below
- Bishops of Moshi (Roman rite)
  - Bishop Joseph James Byrne, C.S.Sp. (1953.03.25 – 1959.05.15); see above
  - Bishop Joseph Kilasara, C.S.Sp. (1960.01.12 – 1966.11.03)
  - Bishop Joseph Sipendi (1968.01.11 – 1985.04.29)
  - Bishop Amedeus Msarikie (1986.03.21 – 2007.11.21)
  - Bishop Isaac Amani Massawe (2007.11.21 - 2017.12.27), appointed Archbishop of Arusha
  - Bishop Ludovick Joseph Minde, ALCP/OSS (2019.12.02 - )

== See also ==
- Roman Catholicism in Tanzania

== Sources ==
- GCatholic.org
- Catholic Hierarchy
