= Paul Runangaza Ruzoka =

Tanzanian Roman Catholic prelate (born 1948)

The Most Reverend Paul Runangaza Ruzoka
- Archbishop Emeritus of Tabora
- Church: Catholic Church
- Archdiocese: Roman Catholic Archdiocese of Tabora
- Province: Tabora
- Metropolis: Tabora
- Diocese: Tabora
- Appointed: 25 November 2006
- Installed: 28 January 2007
- Term ended: 10 November 2023
- Predecessor: Mario Epifanio Abdallah Mgulunde
- Successor: Protase Cardinal Rugambwa
- Previous post: Bishop of Kigoma (1990–2006)

Orders
- Ordination: 20 July 1975 by Bishop Alphonse Daniel Nsabi
- Consecration: 6 January 1990 by John Paul II

Personal details
- Born: 1 January 1948 (age 78) Nyakayenzi, Tanganyika
- Motto: Nitalitii neno lako

Paul Runangaza Ruzoka (born 1948) is a Tanzanian prelate of the Catholic Church who is the Archbishop Emeritus of the Metropolitan Archdiocese of Tabora. He served as archbishop of Tabora from 2006 until 2023. Previously, he served as the Bishop of the Roman Catholic Diocese of Kigoma from 10 November 1989 until 25 November 2006. He was appointed bishop in 1989 by Pope John Paul II.

== Background and education ==
Paul Runangaza Ruzoka was born in 1948 in Nyakayenzi, in the Diocese of Kigoma.

== Priest ==
He was ordained priest by the laying on of hands by Bishop Alphons Daniel Nsabi of the Catholic Diocese of Kigoma, being the sixth native priest of Kigoma, to be ordained priest in Kigoma.

== Bishop ==
On 10 November 1989, Pope John Paul II appointed him the Bishop of the Catholic Diocese of Kigoma and was consecrated by Saint John Paul II on 6 January 1990, at St. Peter's Basilica in the Vatican City. Saint John Paul II was assisted by Archbishop Giovanni Battista Re, Titular Archbishop of Forum Novum and Archbishop Miroslav Stefan Marusyn, Titular Archbishop of Cadi.

On 25 November 2006, Pope Benedict XVI appointed him the Archbishop of the Roman Catholic Archdiocese of Tabora and he was officially installed on 28 January 2007. He retired 10 November 2023 upon reaching the retirement age of bishops of 75 years. He was succeeded by Protase Cardinal Rugambwa.

== See also ==
- Roman Catholicism in Tanzania

Catholic Church titles
| Preceded by Alphonse Daniel Nsabi (15 December 1969 - 16 August 1989) | Bishop of Kigoma (10 November 1989 - 25 November 2006 | Succeeded by Protase Rugambwa (18 January 2008 - 26 June 2012 |
| Preceded by Mario Epifanio Abdallah Mgulunde (9 March 1985 - 14 March 2006) | Archbishop of Tabora; 25 November 2006 - 10 November 2023 | Succeeded by Protase Rugambwa (since 10 November 2023) |
