= Roman Catholic Archdiocese of Tabora =

Roman Catholic archdiocese in Tanzania, Africa

Metropolitan Archdiocese of Tabora Archidioecesis Metropolitae Taboraënsis Jimbo Kuu la Tabora

Location
- Country: Tanzania
- Territory: Tabora, Kigoma
- Ecclesiastical province: Archdiocese of Tabora
- Coordinates: 5°01′S 32°48′E

Statistics
- Area: 76,151 sq mi (197,230 km^{2})
- Population: Total; Catholics: (as of 2022); 2435200; 246139 (10.1%)
- Parishes: 30

Information
- Denomination: Catholic
- Sui iuris church: Latin Church
- Rite: Roman Rite
- Established: January 11, 1887
- Cathedral: St. Theresa’s Metropolitan Cathedral
- Patron saint: Saint Teresa of Calcutta
- Secular priests: 96

Current leadership
- Pope: Leo XIV
- Metropolitan Archbishop: Protase Rugambwa
- Suffragans: Kigoma; Kahama; Mpanda
- Bishops emeritus: Paul R. Ruzoka

Website
- catbr.or.tz
- Roman Catholic Archdiocese of Tabora (Tanzania)

The Roman Catholic Metropolitan Archdiocese of Tabora (Latin: Archidioecesis Metropolitae Taboraënsis) is the Metropolitan See for the ecclesiastical province of Tabora in Tanzania.

In the year 2004 it had 257.390 faithful among 1.426.998 people (18.0%), with 64 priests (43 diocesans and 21 religious) (1 per 4,021 Catholics, 32 brothers and 159 sisters in 22 parishes. As per 2020 statistics, it had 235,748 faithful among 2,362,660 people (10%), with 97 priests (59 diocesan and 38 religious) which is approx. 1 priest per 2,430 Catholics. Also there was 54 male religious and 229 female religious.

== History ==
- January 11, 1887: Established as Apostolic Vicariate of Unianyembé from the Apostolic Vicariate of Tanganyika
- May 31, 1925: Promoted as Diocese of Tabora
- March 25, 1953: Promoted as Metropolitan Archdiocese of Tabora

== Special churches ==
The seat of the archbishop is St. Theresa's Metropolitan Cathedral in Tabora.

== Bishops ==
=== Ordinaries ===
Vicars Apostolic of Unianyembé (Roman rite)

- François Gerboin, M. Afr. (1897.01.28 – 1912.06.27)
- Henri Léonard, M. Afr. (1912.06.27 – 1925.05.31 see below)

Vicars Apostolic of Tabora (Roman rite)

- Henri Léonard, M. Afr. (see above 1925.05.31 – 1928.07.23)
- Edouard Michaud, M. Afr. (1928.11.29 – 1932.03.24), appointed Coadjutor Vicar Apostolic of Uganda
- Joseph Trudel, M. Afr. (1933.04.25 – 1949.02.04)
- Cornelius Bronsveld, M. Afr. (1950.05.31 – 1953.03.25 see below)

Metropolitan Archbishops of Tabora (Roman rite)

- Cornelius Bronsveld, M. Afr. (see above 1953.03.25 – 1959.12.21)
- Marko Mihayo (1960.06.21 – 1985.03.09)
- Mario Epifanio Abdallah Mgulunde (1985.03.09 – 2006.03.14)
- Paul R. Ruzoka (25 November 2006 – 10 November 2023)
- Protase Cardinal Rugambwa (since 10 November 2023)

=== Coadjutor Vicar Apostolic ===
- Henri Léonard, M. Afr. (1912)

=== Auxiliary Bishop ===
- Bernard Mabula (1969–1972), appointed Bishop of Singida
- Josaphat Jackson Bududu (since 26 February 2025)

== Suffragan dioceses ==
- Kahama
- Kigoma
- Mpanda

== See also ==
- Roman Catholicism in Tanzania

== Sources ==
- Tanzania Episcopal Conference
- Bolla Quemadmodum ad Nos, AAS 45 (1953), p. 705
