= 1997 in games =

This page lists board and card games, wargames, miniatures games, and tabletop role-playing games published in 1997. For video games, see 1997 in video gaming.

== Games released or invented in 1997 ==
- Aliens vs. Predator Collectible Card Game
- American Megafauna
- Babylon 5 Collectible Card Game
- Bohnanza
- Checkpoint
- Close Action
- Colossal Arena
- Dark Eden
- Delta Green (role-playing game supplement)
- Dune Collectible Card Game
- Dzikie Pola (role-playing game)
- Fluxx
- Groo: The Game
- Imajica
- In Nomine (role-playing game)
- LionHeart (Strategy, Wargame)
- Monster Collection
- Multiverser (role-playing game)
- Primordial Soup
- Rat-a-Tat Cat
- Shadowrun: The Trading Card Game
- Spaceopoly
- Tigris and Euphrates
- Tinker's Damn
- Trinity (role-playing game)
- Warlords
- Werewolf: The Wild West (role-playing game)

== Game awards given in 1997 ==
- Spiel des Jahres: Mississippi Queen - Werner Hodel, Goldsieber
- Mensa Select: Quoridor

== Significant game-related events in 1997 ==
- Eden Studios, Inc. was founded by George Vasilakos and M. Alexander Jurkat.
- TSR, Inc., the owner of the Dungeons & Dragons tabletop role-playing game, was acquired by Wizards of the Coast.

== Deaths ==
| Date | Name | Age | Notability |
|---|---|---|---|
| January 30 | Ulrich Kiesow | 47 | German RPG designer |
| October 18 | William Rotsler | 71 | Artist and gamebook author |

== See also ==
- 1997 in video gaming
