= Petter Nallo =

Game designer

Petter Nallo (born 1977) is a Swedish game designer and screenwriter who is best known for his work on the role-playing games Eon and KULT: Divinity Lost, and for co-founding the Swedish games company Helmgast.

== Early life ==
Petter Nallo grew up in northern Sweden, and started playing both the American role-playing game (RPG) Dungeons & Dragons as well as Swedish RPGs Mutant, KULT, and Eon. He eventually started to write magazine articles about Eon for the Swedish games magazine Codex.

== Career ==
In 2000, as a freelancer, Nallo contributed to the second edition of Eon being produced by the game's publisher, Neogames. He also contributed to several Eon supplements including 2001's Legender & Hemligheter (Legends & Secrets).

In 2002, Nallo moved to Gothenburg to join the staff of Neogames, first as an intern, and then as a full-time writer. He was Creative Director of the team that produced a third edition of Eon in 2004, and also worked on a number of Eon supplements.

In 2006, Nallo, Marco Behrmann, and Jonas Karlsson created a new dystopian Swedish RPG, Noir. The Swedish games magazine Fenix called it ""the most innovative Swedish role-playing game in 10 years", and the magazine's readers voted it the best RPG of the year.

In 2008, Nallo joined Jungle Peak Studios, where he and Edward Anton wrote scripts for the Swedish television series Azaya.

About this time, Nallo, Anton Wahnström, Jonatan Gertler and Niklas Fröjd decided to create a 4th edition of Neo. They wanted to produce the new edition themselves, so acquired the license and co-founded the company Helmgast. The new edition was published in 2014.

Nallo also wanted Helmgast to produce a 4th edition of the popular Swedish-language RPG KULT that he had played in high school, but the license owner, Cabinet Entertainment, insisted the new edition had to be produced in English. With Nallo as Creative Director, Helmgast published KULT: Divinity Lost in 2018. At the 2019 ENnie Awards, KULT: Divinity Lost won Silver Awards for "Best Writing" and "Best Cover Art", and was a finalist for "Best Interior Art".

== Works ==
=== Eon RPG ===
==== 2nd edition (Neogames) ====
- Eon, 2nd edition, with Marco Behrmann, Dan Johansson, Carl Johan Ström, and Krister Sundelin
- Vandöda & nekromanti (Undead & necromancy) with Carl Johan Ström (2002)
- Encyklopedia Mundana with Carl Johan Ström and Anton Wahnström (2003)
- Fjärran riken (Distant realms) with Carl Johan Ström (2003)
- Sjöfarare & Pirater (Sailors & Pirates), with Carl Johan Ström (2003)
- Atlas, with Marco Behrmann, Carl Johan Ström, Krister Sundelin, and Anton Wahnström (2003)

==== 3rd edition (Neogames) ====
- Eon, 3rd edition, with Marco Behrmann, Dan Johansson, Carl Johan Ström, and Krister Sundelin (2004)
- Thalamur with Carl Johan Ström and Kim Vässmar (2006)
- Misslor with Krister Sundelin and Kim Vässmar (2008)
- Alver: Sångarens ätt (Elves: The singer's family), with Sebastian Andersson and Krister Sundelin (2009)

==== 4th edition (Helmgast) ====
- Eon, 4th edition, with Niklas Fröjd, and Anton Wahnström (2014)

=== Noir RPG ===
- Noir with Marco Behrmann (2008)

=== KULT RPG ===
- KULT: Divinity Lost, 4th edition, (as Creative Director, 2018)
- Oakwood Heights with Robin Liljenberg (2017)

=== Hjältarnas tid RPG (The time of heroes) ===
- Sagor från trollskogen (Tales from the Trollwood, 2017)

=== Television series ===
- Azaya with Edward Anton (2008)
