= Warzone: Beasts of War =

Tabletop game supplement

Warzone: Beasts of War is a 1997 tabletop game supplement published by Target Games for Warzone

== Contents ==
Warzone: Beasts of War is a supplement in which vehicle rules are introduced. The supplement includes a range of vehicles for each faction, with Capitol receiving the most attention. Data cards are provided for quick reference. A few new weapons are added to balance the increased presence of vehicles. Beyond vehicles, the book explores Special Forces units, notably Mishima's Ki-powered Demon Hunters and new cultist types for Algeroth.

== Publication history ==
Warzone: Beasts of War is the second rules compendium for the Mutant Chronicles wargame, Warzone, produced by Heartbreaker.

== Reception ==
Mark Donald reviewed Warzone: Beasts of War for Arcane magazine, rating it a 6 out of 10 overall, and stated that "It's not quite as well done as the first volume, it's briskly written but the vehicle rules in particular don't follow the most logical order and so come across as a bit confused even though they are perfectly comprehensible."

== Reviews ==
- Backstab #9 (as "Les bêtes de guerre")
