= Kult Player's Companion =

1996 role-playing game supplement

Kult Player's Companion is a 1996 role-playing game supplement published by Metropolis Ltd for Kult.

== Contents ==
Kult Player's Companion is a supplement in which support is provided to players for character creation, offering a range of new archetypes, advantages, disadvantages, dark secrets, and skills, along with advice for players looking to deepen their roleplaying experience. While it does not divulge any metaphysical and conspiratorial secrets, the book conveys the unsettling tone of the game through a series of short stories. Visually, it features most interior artwork than earlier supplements and a brown cover with a blood-smeared collage. The new content includes a diverse spread of skills, from "city/area secrets" to skills such as "agronomy" and "erotica." Archetypes range from asylum escapees and fugitives, or playing Children of the Night, and a detailed martial arts section.

== Publication history ==
Shannon Appelcline explained that Target Games ended their Swedish-language production of Kult in 1994, leaving Metropolis to publish the last of their books, but Metropolis lacked additional material: "Fortunately, Target was willing to step back up and started producing new English language material. Metropolis staffers Terry Amthor and James Estes contributed some of the new material published that year, such as the Kult Player's Companion (1996), while Gunilla Jonsson and Michael Petersen returned with other new material such as Heart, Mind, and Soul (1996) - a book about magic that would soon become a foundation of the second edition's rules."

== Reception ==
Lucya Szachnowski reviewed Kult Player's Companion for Arcane magazine, rating it a 7 out of 10 overall, and stated that "Unlike Player's Guides for some horror systems, which manage to give away vital background secrets and often contain material more useful for refs than players, the Kult Player's Companion is exactly what its name says."
