= Anders Fager =

Swedish horror writer

Anders Fager Johansson
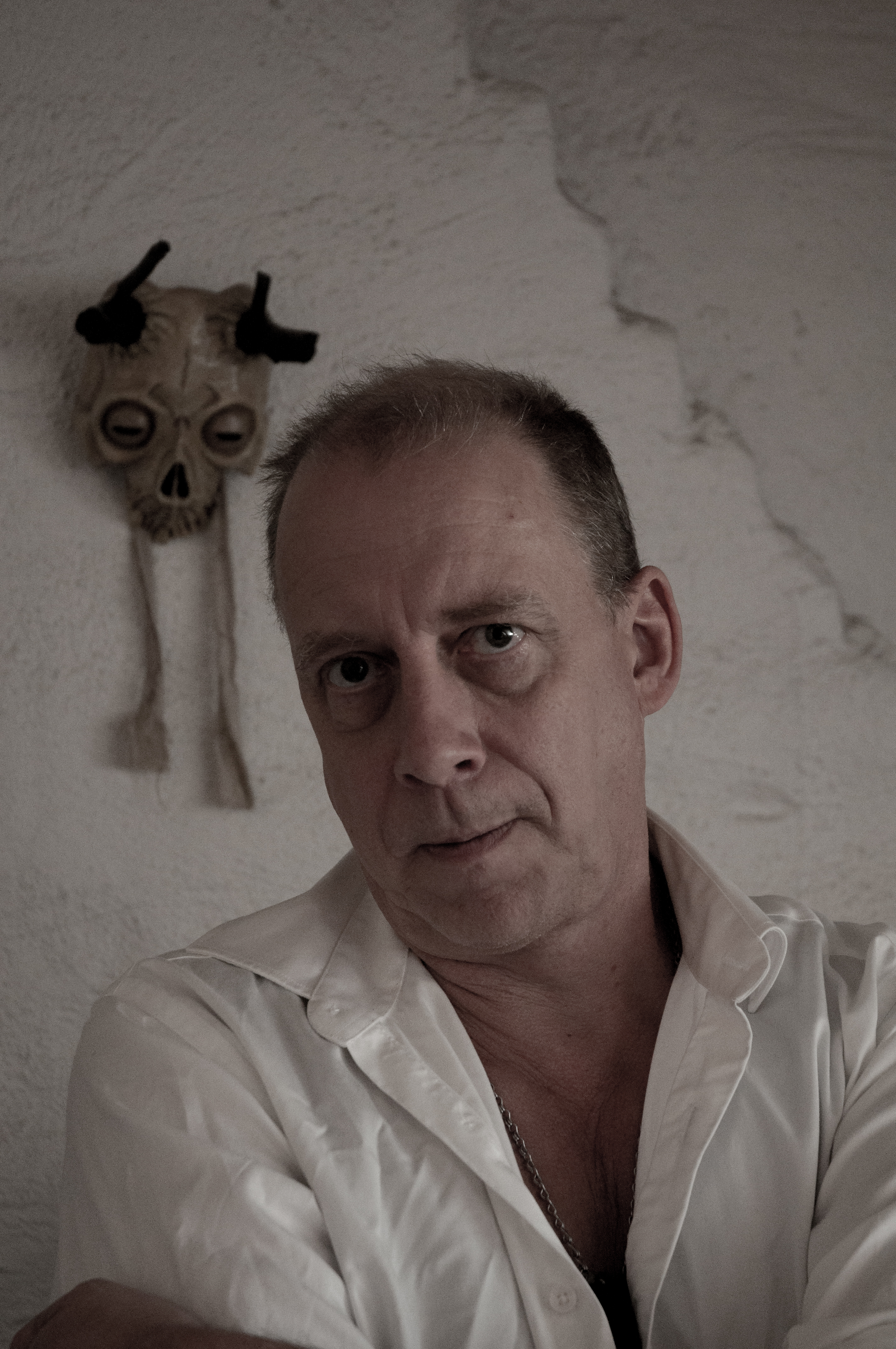
- Born: 3 March 1964 (age 62); Stockholm
- Occupation: Novelist
- Writing career
- Notable works: Svenska Kulter; Jag såg henne idag i receptionen
- Notable awards: Catahyapriset; 2010

Anders Fager Johansson (born 1964) is a Swedish game designer and horror writer.

== Career ==
Born in Stockholm, eighteen year old Fager joined Äventyrspel in 1982 to travel around the country demonstrating Sweden's first role-playing game, Drakar & Demoner, a game that at the time was compared to "improvised radio theatre". Fager wrote Spindelkonungens pyramid, the first role-playing game adventure published in Swedish. He also co-designed board games for the Äventyrsspel label, such as Lützen and Monstret som slukade Stockholm.

After among other things an army career, Fager made his debut as a writer in 2009 with the short story collection Swedish Cults (Svenska kulter) that received a most favourable review in Swedish newspaper Dagens Nyheter and launched Fager's career as full-time writer. Fager writes modern urban horror in a style he has repeatedly described as ”what would happen if James Ellroy took on H.P. Lovecraft”. Set in present-day Sweden, his interconnected stories form a modern part of the Cthulhu Mythos with entities such as Dagon, Hastur and Nyarlathotep making appearances. Fager's fictional world, known as "The Cult's World", has been made into a role playing game and a graphic novel and his stories has been worked into the Swedish edition of role playing game Call of Cthulhu. Fager has been published in Finland, Italy and France.

In the 2010s he has written role-playing supplements for such games as Kult, Twilight: 2000, Call of Cthulhu, Tales from the Loop and the new release of Chock, originally a Swedish translation of the RPG Chill. In 2020 his short story "Backstairs" was published by US publisher Valancourt Books. In 2022 Fager and artist Peter Bergting's graphic novel The Crows was published by Dark Horse Comics. and "Swedish Cults" published in the USA by Valancourt Books.

== Awards ==
- Catahyapriset 2009, for the short story "Mormors resa" (Grandmother's Journey)
- Nominated twice for the French Grand Prix de l'Imaginaire, for "Les furies de Borås" and "La Reine en jaune"
- Nominated for the "Augustpriset" in 2020, for "The Crows".

== Bibliography ==
- Swedish Cults (2009, Svenska kulter)
- Collected Swedish Cults (2011; Samlade svenska kulter – An omnibus featuring the short stories from Swedish Cults as well as "Interspecies Liaisons" and "You can not live")
- I Saw Her Today at the Reception (2012, Jag såg henne idag i receptionen)
- Under the bridge at Arcole (2014, - Short story in Paradox Interactive's anthology Europa Universalis)
- The Evil Substitute (2014, Den elaka vikarien, children's book with Daniel Thollin)
- A Man of Wealth and Taste (2014, En man av stil och smak)
- Kaknäs' last tape (2015, Kaknäs sista band)
- Dirty Black Summer (2016, Smutsig svart sommar, graphic novel adopted from The Furies from Borås)
- Eve's First Week Being Dead (2017, Evas första vecka som död, audiobook)
- For the Love of Goddess (2017, För Gudinnan, novel)
- Faraday - audionovel. For the roleplaying game Kult.
- War! Children! (2019, Krig! Barn!, novel)
- The Crows (2020, Kråkorna, graphic novel with Peter Bergting)
- Kraken (2021, easy reading)
- The Octopus and the Japanese sailor (2022, "Bläckfisken och den japanske sjömannen", novel.)
- Haga Video (2023, stand alone-short story)
- The Case of Pretty Olle (2024, ”Ynglingamorden”, novel)
- Forbidden Pregnancy (2024, ”Förbjuden Graviditet”, stand alone-short story)
