= Kult GM Screen =

Accessory for Kult RPG

- Players' side art by Peter Andrew Jones
- Designers: Terence Kevin Amthor; James Estes; Andreas Marklund
- Illustrators: Peter Andrew Jones; Peter Bergting
- Publishers: Metropolis Ltd
- Publication: 1994
- Genres: Horror

Kult GM Screen is an accessory published by Metropolis Ltd in 1994 for the horror role-playing game Kult.

== Description ==
Kult GM Screen is a glossy three-panel gamemaster's screen that, on the gamemaster's side, summarizes key tables, including general action, combat variables (wound and armor effects, hit locations, range and situational modifiers), and ego throw modifications.

The player's side has a three-panel illustration taken from the original Kult rulebook.

An included 32-page booklet contains weapon tables, an expanded four-page character sheet, and a short adventure, "Unto Death."

== Publication history ==
Kult was originally published in Swedish by Target Games in 1991, and was later translated into German, English, Italian, Spanish, Polish and French. Terry K. Amthor left Iron Crown Enterprises in 1992 to co-found Metropolis Ltd., specifically to produce the English-language version of the game. In 1994, Metropolis released the Kult GM Screen, designed by Terence Kevin Amthor, James Estes and Andreas Marklund, with cover art by Peter Andrew Jones and interior art by Peter Bergting.

== Reception ==
In Issue 56 of White Wolf Inphobia, Denys Bakriges commented, "The excellent GM screen concisely and handily puts forth the most important tables and lists of the game system." About the included adventure, Bakriges noted "As is the usual Kult practice, the player characters become victims during the course of the adventure, but this scenario goes too far in herding the characters from one tortuous situation to the next." Bakriges concluded, "The chilling GM screen [illustration] itself is worth the price of the package; although the supplemental booklet offers little value."

In Issue 13 of The Unspeakable Oath, Allan Grohe thought the information presented on the screen "is clearly important to maintaining the flow of game play" but questioned why the tables for weapons, accidents, poisons and sedatives were not also included on the side facing the players, calling it "a noticeable lack. Combat can be slowed as participants seek necessary stats, a search the GM Screen could have considerably sped up." Grohe liked the revised and expanded character sheets in the accompanying booklet, calling them "the best aspect of the product, despite their lackluster appearance." However, Grohe called the included scenario "a hideously constraining, linear adventure ... The action in 'Unto Death' moves from event to event, taking into account no deviation from the scripted outline." Grohe concluded by giving this product a rating of 5.5 out of 10.

== Other reviews and commentary ==
- Windgeflüster (Issue 27 - Oct 1994, in German)
