= Warzone: Dawn of War =

Tabletop game supplement

Warzone: Dawn of War is a 1996 tabletop game supplement published by Target Games for Warzone.

== Contents ==
Warzone: Dawn of War is a supplement in which its primary goal is to refine aspects of the core game—most notably close combat—by streamlining mechanics and offering fresh content without bogging down gameplay. The book expands every army with new units and gear, introducing paramedics, AI forces, and standout characters from Mutant Chronicles like Cardinal Dominic and kamikaze Mishiman operatives. Some additions include AI rules, indirect fire and clubbing, sweep attacks and anti-sniper tactics, and close combat now includes mechanics like parries and counter-charges.

== Publication history ==
Warzone: Dawn of War is the first supplement for the Warzone sci-fi wargame.

== Reception ==
Mark Donald reviewed Warzone: Dawn of War for Arcane magazine, rating it a 7 out of 10 overall, and stated that "Anyone who counts Warzone among their pursuits should be able to put this book to good use. My only reservation is that, by trying to cover so many forces evenly, some of the ideas are given scant regard. I feel future supplements should specialise."

== Reviews ==
- Backstab #4
