= Gunilla Jonsson and Michael Petersén =

Game designers

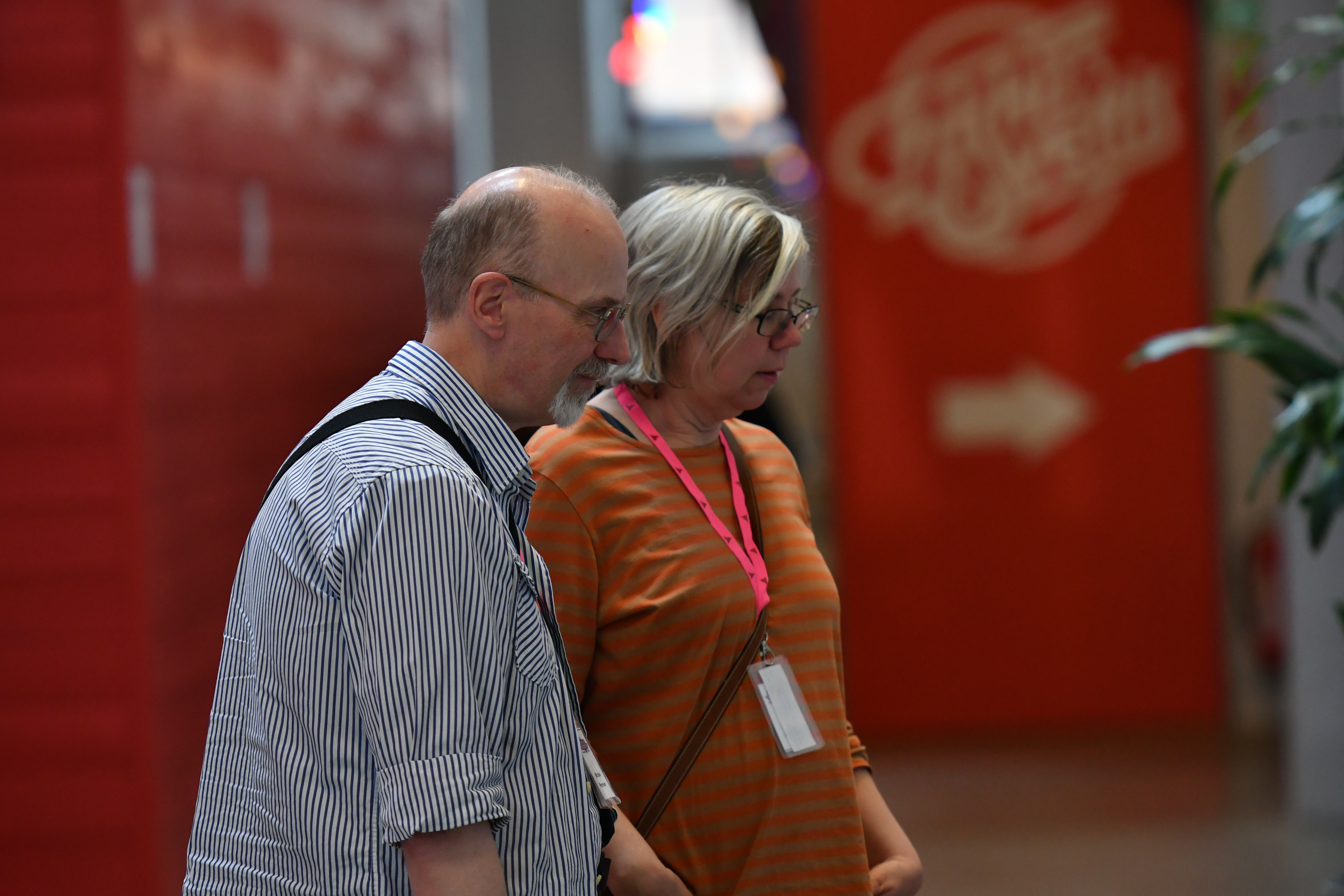
Michael Petersén and Gunilla Jonsson at a science fiction convention (Swecon 2018)

Gunilla Jonsson and Michael Petersén are Swedish writers and designers of role-playing games. They wrote the Mutant and KULT games while working for Äventyrsspel (Target Games) in the 1980s. They helmed their own game company, Ragnarök Speldesign, for a few years in the late 1980s.

== Personal life ==
Jonsson and Petersén ended up in the same group of role-players in 1981. They are married, and both work at the SF-Bokhandeln bookstore in Stockholm. They write for Perilous Worlds.

== Awards ==
- Rollspelsdraken 2012
- The ESFS Chrysalis Awards (Sweden) 2019

== Works ==
- Mutant (rpg, 1984, Äventyrsspel)
- KULT (rpg, 1991, Äventyrsspel)
  - Mörkrets Legioner, Den Svarta Madonnan, Fallna Änglar, Tarotikum
- Writing credits on games Sagan om Ringen (Swedish translation of MERP) and Western Rollspelet
- several scenarios for Drakar och Demoner, Chock (Swedish translation of Chill) and Mutant (1984 and 1991 versions), including Spökgeneralen and Uppdrag i Mos Mosel
- En Garde! (rpg, 1987, Ragnarök Speldesign)
- Skuggornas Mästare (rpg, 1988, Ragnarök Speldesign)
- Döden är bara början and De levande döda (novels, 2018/2020, Free League Publishing)
