= Legions of Darkness =

Legions of Darkness is a 1993 role-playing supplement for Kult published by Metropolis Ltd.

== Contents ==
Legions of Darkness is a supplement in which the inhabitants of the hellish realm of Metropolis are described.

== Publication history ==
Shannon Appelcline explained that "Metropolis published Kult products for four years, from 1993-1996. They were never a particularly big publisher, but they averaged two or three books each year. Through 1995, Metropolis reprinted books from Target, including two of the lines' most important books: Legions of Darkness (1993), a sort of 'monster manual' that also considerably expanded the cosmology of the game; and Metropolis (1995), the games' only look at a realm beyond the 'illusion.'"

== Reception ==
Denys Bakriges reviewed Legions of Darkness in White Wolf #40 (1994), rating it a 3.5 out of 5 and stated that "Many of the personalities detailed throughout are extremely powerful. Their usefulness is limited to that of archenemies. This book, however, does offer many different plot possibilities and is an invaluable resource for the Kult GM."

== Reviews ==
- The Unspeakable Oath #10 (Fall, 1993)
- Franc-Rêveur (Issue 3 - Apr 1996)
