= Taroticum =

Taroticum is a 1994 role-playing adventure for Kult published by Metropolis Ltd.

== Contents ==
Taroticum is an adventure in which six adventures link together to form a horror campaign in London.

== Reception ==
Denys Bakriges reviewed Taroticum in White Wolf Inphobia #53 (March, 1995), rating it a 4 out of 5 and stated that "Taroticum is an excellent value. The campaign itself takes five or more game sessions to get through. Even though the adventures can't be used separately, GMs can cannibalize numerous NPCs, locations and plot ideas for their own campaigns if they don't want to run Taroticum itself."
