= Anders Blixt =

Swedish game designer and journalist

Anders Blixt (born 1959) is a Swedish game designer and science journalist. He is one of the most well-published designers of role playing games in Sweden and has had a leading role in the production of most of them, including classical titles such as Drakar och Demoner and Mutant.

== Selected works ==
=== Äventyrsspel ===
- Drakar och Demoner Expert
- Drakar och Demoner Gigant
- Monsterboken
- Monsterboken 2
- Torshem
- Mutant 2
- Efter Ragnarök

=== Rävspel ===
- Gondica
- Gondica Bestiarium
- Gondica Abyssos
- Lemuria
- Spiran och staven (fantasy novel)
- The Ice War (science fiction novel in English)

=== Lancelot Games ===
- Encyclopedia Digoni
- Wastelands
- Wastelands Sverige

=== Modiphius ===
Mutant Year Zero

=== Iron Crown Enterprises ===
- Gorgoroth
- The Kin-strife
- Southern Gondor
- Cyber Europe

=== 101 Productions ===
- Viking
- Norden
- Västerled
- Jarl Eriks Arv

=== Saga Games ===
- Röd Sand
- Knivblänk i Prag
- Roma Umbrarum

=== Västerås bishopric ===
- Ansgar

=== Eloso ===
- Märk hur vår skugga (a Chock adventure, a supernatural who-dunnit in Stockholm)
- Basker Blå (West (a Chock setting, Swedish UN soldiers in West Africa encountering supernatural horrors)
- Expert Nova 2.0
- Call of Cthulhu Sverige
- Expert Partisan (civilian resistance in an East Bloc-occupied Sweden in 1982)

=== Försvarets internationella centrum (SWEDINT) ===
- Kashmir's Forgotten Guardians
