= The Judas Grail =

1996 role-playing game supplement

The Judas Grail is a 1996 role-playing game adventure published by Metropolis Ltd for Kult.

== Plot summary ==
The Judas Grail is an adventure in which the player characters are drawn to Spain into a slow-burning mystery tied to an inheritance.

== Reception ==
Lucya Szachnowski reviewed The Judas Grail for Arcane magazine, rating it a 6 out of 10 overall, and stated that "Ultimately, The Judas Grail has moments of great horror potential that too often go unrealised."

== Reviews ==
- Backstab #3
