= Capitol: Pride and Profit =

Capitol: Pride and Profit is a 1994 role-playing supplement for Mutant Chronicles published by Target Games.

== Contents ==
Capitol: Pride and Profit is a supplement in which information is provided for characters working for or living under the Capitol megacorporation.

== Reception ==
Denys Bakriges reviewed Capitol: Pride and Profit in White Wolf Inphobia #57 (July, 1995), rating it a 4 out of 5 and stated that "This book succeeds merely as a tool for megacorporation design. Capitol offers an exciting opportunity for roleplaying without Mutant Chronicles' usual 'balls-to-the-wall' mentality."

== Reviews ==
- Shadis #20 (July, 1995)
