= The Brotherhood (Mutant Chronicles) =

The Brotherhood is a 1993 role-playing supplement for Mutant Chronicles published by Target Games.

== Contents ==
The Brotherhood is a supplement in which the fanatic military organization called the Brotherhood is described.

== Publication history ==
The Brotherhood was the first sourcebook published for Mutant Chronicles.

== Reception ==
Denys Bakriges reviewed The Brotherhood in White Wolf #43 (May, 1994), rating it a 4 out of 5 and stated that "This book can be put to use immediately by both players and gamemasters. Players should like the plethora of new character choices and equipment, while GMs should easily make use of the organization's plots and schemes. The Brotherhood makes a welcome addition to the Mutant Chronicles universe."

== Reviews ==
- Shadis #16
