= Beyond the Pale (Mutant Chronicles) =

Beyond the Pale is a 1997 role-playing game adventure published by Target Games for Mutant Chronicles.

== Contents ==
Beyond the Pale is an adventure in which Venus is in dire straits—the accidental opening of the Second Seal has unleashed a cascade of dark events threatening all human life on the planet. The Dark Legion emerges as a destructive force, and the player characters must confront its deadly agent and prevent planetary annihilation.

== Publication history ==
Beyond the Pale is the concluding chapter of The Venusian Apocalypse trilogy for Mutant Chronicles, following The Second Seal of Repulsion and The Four Riders.

== Reception ==
Andy Butcher reviewed Beyond the Pale for Arcane magazine, rating it a 6 out of 10 overall, and stated that "Beyond the Pale provides a worthy climax to the story, with plenty of things for the players to do and a suitably epic scale. It's not the most innovative adventure ever, but it does do a fairly good job of tying up all the relevant plots, and making the players feel that they've truly accomplished something at the end of it."
