= Mutant (role-playing game) =

Post-apocalyptic tabletop role-playing game

- 1989 version box cover
- Designers: Nils Gullikson, Michael Stenmark, Henrik Strandberg, Magnus Seter, Jerker Sojdelius, Stefan Thulin, Fredrik Malmberg
- Publishers: Target Games
- Publication: 1984 (Mutant); 1989 ("New Mutant"); 1992 (Mutant RYMD); 1993 (Mutant Chronicles); 2002 (Mutant - Undergångens arvtagare); 2014 (Mutant - År Noll)
- Genres: post-apocalypse, cyberpunk, space opera
- Systems: Basic Role-Playing; Custom
- Brand: Äventyrsspel

Mutant is a series of Swedish role-playing games developed and published by Target Games using their Äventyrsspel (Adventure games) brand. The current version was created by Fria Ligan under license by Cabinet Entertainment and published in Swedish and English by Fria Ligan and Modiphius respectively. A video game adaptation named Mutant Year Zero: Road to Eden was released December 2018.

== Publication history ==
The first role-playing game published by Äventyrsspel in 1982 was a fantasy game titled Drakar och Demoner (Dragons & Demons), which used a variant of Chaosium's Basic Role-Playing (BRP) rules system. Äventyrsspel then moved to a post-apocalyptic Swedish setting featuring mutants (humans with enhanced powers) and mutated animals (anthropomorphic intelligent humanoids with similar powers). The result, titled Mutant, was written by Gunilla Jonsson & Michael Petersén with illustrations by Nils Gulliksson. The game was expanded with the release of Mutant 2 (1986) and was continued to be published throughout the 1980s.

In 1989, Äventyrsspel published a second edition that switched to a cyberpunk setting heavily inspired by the Blade Runner movie, with new character options. This edition was also titled Mutant, but is commonly referred to by players as Nya Mutant (New Mutant).

A new edition in 1992 titled Mutant RYMD (Mutant SPACE) made more changes to the setting by moving it into the Solar System. This iteration, however, was short-lived: after the English release of Äventyrsspel's Kult, Mutant RYMD was replaced in 1993 by Mutant Chronicles; this new edition included elements of both Kult without the religious elements and Mutant RYMD. It was released nearly simultaneously in both Sweden and the United States, as a pen and paper role-playing game, a collectible miniatures game (Warzone) and a board game (Siege of the Citadel). The English translation of Mutant Chronicles was provided by Heartbreaker Hobbies and Games.

After Äventyrsspel ceased publication the rights to the original (post-apocalyptic) Mutant role-playing game was acquired by Järnringen (The Iron Ring), who published a new edition in 2002 titled Mutant: Undergångens arvtagare (Mutant: Heirs of the Apocalypse). Järnringen continued to support this Swedish line through 2008 but did not translate it into English.

In 2014 a new game in the franchise was released by Fria Ligan ("Free League") under license from Paradox Entertainment (the successor company of Target Games, now Cabinet Entertainment). Titled Mutant - År Nol" (Mutant: Year Zero), the game uses the same post-apocalyptic premise as the original 1984 version, but set several hundred years earlier, when the apocalypse is still fresh and mutations are new and unstable. Free League has published many related products available in several languages.

In 2020, after a successful Kickstarter campaign, Free League released Mutant: Hindenburg, set a generation after the events of the 2002 Undergångens Arvtagare campaign. Hindenburg attempts to retrofit all three post-apocalyptic settings (the original 1984 game, Järnringen's 2002 game and their own 2014 Mutant: Year Zero into one fictional history. This game uses a modified version of the Mutant: Year Zero rules system.

== Mutant (1984 version) ==
The campaign setting of the 1984 release was very similar to the world of the earlier American RPG Gamma World, a mostly undefined world taking place hundreds of years after a big catastrophe. The world is populated by humans, robots, and mutants (including anthropomorphic animals). The rule system was similar to the modified Basic Role-Playing rules used in Äventyrsspel's earlier Drakar och Demoner game, utilizing percentile dice. In 1986 a rules expansion called Mutant 2 was published that among other things introduced a more advanced skill system, advanced rules for combat, hit locations and a more developed campaign setting.

== Mutant (1989 version) ==
In 1989 Äventyrsspel introduced a new version of Mutant (unofficially branded "New Mutant" to distinguish it from the older version). This version features a completely different campaign world: set the year 2089, the world is ruled by large corporations in gigantic cities. This was the first cyberpunk role-playing game in Swedish. The rules stayed roughly compatible with the old ruleset, but with more support for various firearms. Also a new character "class": androids to supplement robots and mutants.

== Mutant RYMD and Mutant Chronicles ==
Mutant RYMD ("Mutant SPACE") was the next, short-lived, version of Mutant published in 1992. The campaign setting was similar to the 1989 version but in Mutant RYMD the corporations put much effort into space exploration and colonization, eventually reaching a fictional tenth planet named Nero and awakening an evil, supernatural force that attacks the Solar System. Some of the monsters and symbols were taken from another of Äventyrsspel's role-playing games, Kult. The rules were more or less identical to that of the 1989 version of Mutant.

In 1993 Mutant RYMD was discontinued in favor of Mutant Chronicles, a game which inherited many aspects of RYMD's campaign setting. As a first for a Swedish rpg, Mutant Chronicles was released in English and with a focus on the international audience.

== Mutant - Undergångens arvtagare ==
After the reconstruction of Target Games and the transfer of its intellectual property to Paradox Entertainment, a new version of Mutant was published under license to a company called Järnringen in 2002. This version, Mutant - Undergångens arvtagare ("Mutant - Heirs of the Apocalypse"), returned to the idea of the original, a post-apocalyptic campaign setting but then created a brand new civilization called Pyrisamfundet freely combining elements of 1700s, 1800s and 1900s Scandinavian society but still with mutated monsters and dangerous radiated zones. The rules of this edition are also based on Basic Role-Playing just like Äventyrsspel's early Swedish role-playing games, but isn't directly compatible to the original game.

== Mutant - År Noll and Mutant: Year Zero ==
In 2014 a new game in the franchise was released by Fria Ligan. In År Noll, and in future expansions, players can play through the emergence of the mutants, the mutated animals, the robots and finally the non-mutated humans into the ravaged world. År Noll uses a custom set of rules based on the physical and psychological hardships of surviving in a post-apocalyptic world.

År Noll was translated into English by Fria Liga's English-language department, Free League Publishing and released as Mutant: Year Zero (M:YZ) in December 2014. The first expansion to the Swedish version, Genlab Alfa, was released in the spring of 2015. A German version of År Noll was released as Mutant - Jahr Null in 2018.

In 2015, Cabinet Holdings acquired Paradox Entertainment and all subsidiaries and their properties, including Mutant.

== Mutant: Year Zero variants and expansions ==
As of 2025 there are 4 additional variants and expansions of M:YZ, which can each be played individually or together, as they all play in the same game-world. Each variant comes with its own rulebook and optional additional material. The additional variants of M:YZ are M:YZ Genlab Alpha, a variant focused on intelligent mutated animals, M:YZ Mechatron focused on robots, M:YZ Elysium, a setting focused on non-mutated humans living in an underground city and society and M:YZ Ad Astra, a campaign setting that takes characters off world and into space.

== Year Zero Engine ==
The foundational game rules and dice mechanisms of M:YZ have been published as the Year Zero Engine (YZE) in the Year Zero Engine Standard Reference under the Year Zero Engine Free Tabletop License, a permissive license that allows for the use of the YZE in third-party products without the need for paying royalties or other fees. As of 2025 YZE is the rules-foundation for the majority of roleplaying games published by Free League Publishing, the swedish M:YZ publisher.

== Reception ==
In his 2023 book Monsters, Aliens, and Holes in the Ground, RPG historian Stu Horvath noted, "At Chaosium's height during the '80s, the company used Basic Role-Playing to crank out classic games and support materials that proved to be hugely influential to the hobby, at large. Mechanically and philosophically, the Year Zero Engine is BRP's cousin and, in many ways, its spiritual successor. In just a few short years, Free League's suite of Year Zero Engine games have already been showered with ENnie Awards and attracted a large community of players."

== Additional M:YZ Products ==
M:YZ Road to Eden is a videogame based on M:YZ and published in 2018, M:YZ Zone Wars is a tabletop miniature skirmish game published in 2024.

== Related products ==
While there exists products other than table-top role-playing games under the Mutant brand, such as the 2018 video game Mutant Year Zero: Road to Eden, most efforts to diversify into video games, board games, collectible card games, miniatures, motion pictures etc. have been made for the Mutant Chronicles brand - please see Mutant Chronicles § Spin-offs.
