= Blood Berets =

Blood Berets is a 1993 game published by Target Games.

== Gameplay ==
Blood Berets is a game in which two-player combat occurs in the Mutant Chronicles universe.

== Reception ==
Denys Bakriges reviewed Blood Berets in White Wolf #42 (April, 1994), rating it a 3.5 out of 5 and stated that "This game should provide you with a variety of ideas for missions. The rules provide enough options to make conflicts interesting and unique. However, the price of the game is too high for the components offered."

== Reviews ==
- Casus Belli #81
- Shadis #10
- Dragon #200
