= Dan Hörning =

Swedish writer and podcaster

Dan Hörning (born 10 March 1970) is a Swedish historical fantasy author. His publishing house is Neogames, and up to now he has published four novels: Svärdsspel i Hadarlon (2000; Swordplay in Hardalon), Stormens vandrare (2006; in English: The Wanderer of Storm), Nemea (2007) and Lasermannen (2009; in English: The Laser Man).

Stormens vandrare is a first volume in his Mörkret (Darkness) trilogy, with two volumes to follow: Ljusets vandrare (The wanderer of light) and Drömmens vandrare (The wanderer of the dream) which have not yet been published.

Hörning received his Master of Science in Computer Engineering from the Royal Institute of Technology, and works for the French corporation, Hi-media. In his free time, Hörning enjoys MMA, role playing games, travelling, and studying other languages. He has been known to be an enthusiastic fan of Swedish-Norwegian fantasy writer Margit Sandemo. Hörning is the admin and founder of the popular Isfolket & Margitsandemo forum. The subject of that forum is Sagan om Isfolket, a 47-volume historical fantasy pulp series by Margit Sandemo. That forum is also used for discussions in Swedish about Dan's books.

Hörning is inspired by Tolkien, JK Rowling, and Margit Sandemo. Sandemo also was a form of tutor for him as well as a source for inspiration.

Hörning has become a "YouTuber". He plays games and provides his own brand of funny and insightful commentary. The game he plays most often is Magic The Gathering Online. In this arena he has produced over 4000 videos. He also appears weekly on The MagicGatheringStrat show podcast.

Hörning is also a history fanatic. So much so, he created a bi-weekly podcast called "The Fan of History". In this podcast he recounts ancient history from 1000 BC and onward. Along with his co-host Brennon Rankin, he tells the stories of the past and tries to bring his excitement to the audience.
