= Doom Troopers =

1995 video game

Mutant Chronicles: Doom Troopers
- Developer: Adrenalin Entertainment
- Publisher: Playmates Interactive Entertainment
- Director: Michael Steele
- Producers: Chris Longpre; Michael Ahn
- Artist: Ian McIntosh
- Composer: Fletcher Beasley
- Platforms: Sega Genesis, Super NES
- Release: NA: November 1995
- Genre: Run and gun
- Modes: Single player, multiplayer

Mutant Chronicles: Doom Troopers is a video game released in 1995 by Adrenalin Entertainment for the Sega Genesis and Super NES gaming systems.

== Gameplay ==
Doom Troopers is a platform shooter similar to the Contra series that is based on the Doomtrooper collectible card game, part of the Mutant Chronicles franchise.

The player assumes the role of one of two commandos fighting an evil horde of invading zombies and mutants. The game features eight different levels and the ability of two players to play cooperatively.

The game was known for depicting blood and mutilations of the enemies killed. For example, the common enemies in the first level are usually decapitated before they die.

== Reception ==
Air Hendrix of GamePro panned the Genesis version, criticizing the small selection of attacks, generally simplistic action, lack of color and detail, and unintentionally humorous death screams.

== Reviews ==
- Sega-16.com - Aug 18, 2004
- SuperGamePower - Dec, 1996 (Portuguese)
- All Game Guide - 1995
