= Mutant Year Zero: Road to Eden =

2018 video game

- Cover art featuring three playable characters (from left to right): Bormin, Selma and Dux
- Developer: The Bearded Ladies
- Publisher: Funcom
- Director: David Skarin
- Producer: Mark Parker
- Designer: Lee Varley
- Composer: Robert Lundgren
- Engine: Unreal Engine 4
- Platforms: PlayStation 4; Windows; Xbox One; Nintendo Switch
- Release: PlayStation 4, Windows, Xbox One; December 4, 2018; Nintendo Switch; July 30, 2019
- Genres: Turn-based tactics, tactical role-playing
- Mode: Single-player

Mutant Year Zero: Road to Eden is a turn-based tactical role-playing video game developed by Swedish studio The Bearded Ladies and published by Funcom. Based on the tabletop role-playing game Mutant Year Zero, the game was released for Windows, PlayStation 4 and Xbox One in December 2018. A Nintendo Switch version of the game was released on July 30, 2019.

== Gameplay ==
In the game, the player issues commands to a party of three characters as they fight against enemies in turn-based combat.

The game was described by publisher Funcom as a "tactical adventure" game, played from an isometric perspective. There are three difficulty levels for players to choose from. Players control a party of three characters as they navigate the game's world. Different characters have different abilities and skills. Selma, a mutated human character, is an expert in explosives; Dux, a duck hybrid, is equipped with a long-range crossbow; Bormin uses shotguns as one of its weapons. Each character also has their own passive, minor and major mutation attacks that can be activated and customized. The team as a whole levels up as the game progresses, and new weapons and gears could be unlocked. The game also features a skill tree, and a branching story. There are five characters for players to choose from, including three default characters and two recruitable ones.

Gameplay alternates between turn-based tactics combat and real-time exploration. The Zone is a series of interconnected maps that players can freely explore. In the Zone, players could collect different artifacts, scraps and weapon parts which can be used to purchase new gears and tools in the Ark, the game's hub world. To explore the world, flashlights can be used to spot different objects, though this draws unwanted enemy attention. In real-time, players can split up the party and guide them in different tactical positions to stage an ambush. Once players enter combat, the game shifts to a turn-based mode, similar to Firaxis' X-COM reboot series. After players finish a turn, enemies controlled by artificial intelligence (AI) would move and respond. Players can also kill an enemy stealthily. If other enemies are not alerted to the player's presence, players can continue exploring in real-time.

The Seed of Evil expansion available as downloadable content for separate purchase extends the story and play area, but does not modify the gameplay significantly. It includes upgrades to existing skills, some advanced equipment, and a new character.

== Plot ==
After the outbreak of the deadly Red Plague and global nuclear war, humans have largely become extinct, with the few surviving ones becoming mutants, having been affected by radiation. The Elder (voiced by Gergo Danka), the only person with the knowledge of the past, resides in the Ark, a fortified settlement that serves as the last bastion of civilization. With severe resource shortages, the base sends out special mutants called Stalkers who scavenge resources in the surrounding wasteland known as the Zone. However, the Zone is also populated by Ghouls, human survivors driven violent and insane from the aftermath of the bombings who worship the old world civilization as the Ancients.

Two Stalkers, Bormin (a humanoid boar voiced by actor Enzo Squillino Jnr) and Dux (a humanoid duck voiced by Jared Zeus), are tasked by the Elder to head north to search for another Stalker, Hammon. Hammon is a technical genius and is the only person capable of keeping the Ark's systems running, but he and his team disappeared during an expedition, and his absence puts the entire Ark at risk. Bormin and Dux set off to find Hammon, finding clues that he journeyed north to investigate a strange craft that crashed from the sky, believing it holds the key to finding the mythical promised land of Eden. As they travel north, they find and rescue Selma and Magnus, Hammon's fellow Stalkers. They also learn of the Nova Sect, a group of fanatically religious Ghouls who seek to restore Ancient weapons technology that can be used against the Ark. The Nova Sect was able to capture Hammon, and are attempting to force him to assist in their plans.

The Stalkers journey to the Nova Sect's headquarters, the Spear of Heaven. Along the way, they recruit Farrow, a Fox mutant determined to get revenge on the Nova Sect for destroying her settlement. They attack the Spear of Heaven and break into an Ancient underground bunker where they find Hammon. Hammon reveals to them that Eden does exist as a secret Ancient facility that holds information on the origins of mutants. However, the Nova Sect were able to read his mind and discover Eden's location, and are heading there to learn its secrets. Hammon directs the Stalkers to beat the Nova Sect to Eden to ensure its knowledge does not fall into the wrong hands. In order to reach Eden first, the Stalkers will have to travel through the Forbidden City, the ruins of an old Red Plague quarantine zone populated by hostile Ancient robots.

Disobeying the Elder's orders, the Stalkers journey through the Forbidden City, where they find the Nova Sect and their leader, Plutonia, attempting to break into Eden. The Stalkers are able to eliminate the Nova Sect and kill Plutonia, and Eden's gates mysteriously open for them. The Stalkers enter Eden and explore the facility, discovering that the Ancients were experimenting with creating mutants before the project was shut down. They are then shocked to find out that the Elder himself was one of the scientists in charge of the experiments, and they remember how he smuggled them to safety to prevent them from being destroyed. At that moment the radio activates and they hear a voice calling for "Command Center Sweden."

=== Seed of Evil ===
Plot of the expansion continues the story of the original game. When the Elder learns that the Stalkers have disobeyed him, he leaves the Ark. Some months later, the team tracks him down in the northeast where a mysterious plant growth had started to spread, also affecting the Ghouls. They confront him, but the Elder escapes to space with a rocket shuttle. After returning home, the Stalkers find the Ark under attack by intruding vines, with some inhabitants also behaving strangely. The community has put the bartender Pripp in charge while they were gone, but he is not competent enough to deal with the situation, so he asks the Stalkers for help. Together, they figure that a likely culprit is the mutant Goran who has the ability to control plants and has been banished from the Ark some time ago.

Stalkers venture further northwest where Goran is thought to have a base, a second Ark not known to the Elder. They are joined by a new mutant, Big Khan (a humanoid moose) who has been wandering the Zone alone, and has also noticed the new threat.

They find Goran in a deserted town and kill him during a fight. It turns out that Goran was also absorbed by plants and had his own will replaced. In that moment, a being called Old Jyko contacts them telepathically, and beckons them over. Old Jyko, whom they know as the oldest tree in the Zone, sends her minions after the Stalkers when they arrive. During the ensuing fight, they destroy her spore pods which kills Old Jyko. She collapses through a hole in the ground, revealing hallways with familiar logos of Mimir corporation which they saw in the original Eden. It is another secret base. The only functional computer reveals that their Elder was a project leader here too. Scientists wanted to design a tree for purifying the air using the same method of creating mutants in a last-ditch effort to save the humanity, but were forced to abandon the base when the war broke out. The tree survived, became self-aware, and decided to "purify" all the creatures in the Zone by transforming them to mindless drones under her control with spores.

When they return, the Stalkers are treated to a heroes' welcome, and Bormin is elected new leader of the Ark.

== Development ==
The game was developed by Swedish developer The Bearded Ladies, a team founded by former IO Interactive developers. The designer of the Payday franchise, Ulf Andersson, served as the game's creative consultant. The game is based on the Swedish tabletop role-playing game Mutant Year Zero. Initially, the team planned to create an open world game, but the team scrapped the idea because it did not blend well with the turn-based combat. Permadeath and recruitable soldiers were planned, but they were removed as the team believed that this would compromise the game's story. To facilitate players' exploration, environmental storytelling became one of the team's focus.

Funcom announced the game in March 2018. The game was released on December 4 for PlayStation 4, Xbox One and Microsoft Windows. It was also part of the Xbox Game Pass subscription programme. In addition to the standard edition, players can purchase the Deluxe Edition, which includes a book, the game's original soundtracks, wallpaper, and other items. An expansion titled Seed of Evil was also released mid-2019, adding more missions and extending the story.

== Reception ==
Reception

Aggregate score
Aggregator	Score
Metacritic	PC: 78/100; PS4: 76/100; XONE: 80/100; NS: 71/100

Review scores
Publication	Score
Destructoid	8/10
Game Informer	7.5/10
GameSpot	9/10
Hardcore Gamer	3.5/5
IGN	7.9/10
Jeuxvideo.com	13/20
Nintendo Life	8/10
Nintendo World Report	7.5/10
PC Gamer (US)	81/100
Push Square	6/10
Shacknews	6/10

The game received generally positive reviews from critics according to review aggregator Metacritic, however the version on Switch received mixed reviews.

The reviewers generally agreed that the game was very satisfying; IGN wrote that "Pulling off a plan that deconstructs all of an enemy's advantages and leads to victory, especially a decisive one, feels very good", GameSpot said that "Juggling all the demands of combat, from patiently surveying the field beforehand through to learning how to best counter each enemy type and improvising a new strategy when it all goes horribly wrong, make for an immensely satisfying tactical experience", while Jeff Marchiafava from Game Informer wrote that "nothing beats the thrill of chaining together a series of stuns and silent attacks to take down a hulking brute or giant mech without alerting their comrades". Rich Meister of Destructoid found the game "intense", even though he admitted that he "was saving early and often". He claimed that the story was not "breaking any new ground", nor the narrative "groundbreaking", however he found the characters "charming". Similarly, David Lloyd of NintendoWorldReport wrote that even though the story contains elements typical for a post-civilization title, the characters and the dialogue are well written. PCGamer, on the other hand, seemed to appreciate the narrative, stating that "Mutant Year Zero has a great blend of sardonic humour, grim detail and cartoon excess". JeuxVideo appreciated both writing and characters, while ShackNews reviewer wrote: "The dialog is particularly good, with lead characters sharing some very humorous and enlightening exchanges throughout the main campaign".

"Where Road to Eden shines is in how it integrates over-world exploration with its XCOM inspired combat" wrote Gameplanet. Jeff Marchiafava of Game Informer found out that "Mutant Year Zero's stealth combat steals the show", seeing "a fair amount of world-building" but "the slow rate of movement and lack of a minimap make it a pain to thoroughly explore". He noted that "the story feels like it's missing a third act" (which is because there is an expansion to the game). The IGN reviewer also noted "a ton of world-building" but was disappointed that it "mostly helps advance Mutant Year Zero's Horizon: Zero Dawn-style unraveling of how humanity destroyed itself". PushSquare reviewer on the opposite, feels that the backstory "certainly has potential", but is mostly put aside to "push the narrative forward". GameStar reviewer, however, seems to be amazed by both the world and the backstory, as he wrote: "we explore a fascinating world and uncover its mysterious backstory". JeuxVideo wrote: "know that special care has been taken to the consistency of the game universe".

Hardcore gamer reviewer is glad that stealth mechanics and tactical gameplay are "seamlessly integrated". Shacknews reviewer, on the other hand, has an impression that sometimes enemies get alarmed when they should not, and sometimes they aren't when they should ("Sometimes enemies would hear silent gunshots and go on alert [...]. Other times, killing a Pyro enemy would cause a fiery explosion, and yet no one seemed to notice"). Additionally, Hardcore gamer reviewer notes that it is of no use to use stealth to bypass weaker enemies, as "the game is set up, every possible enemy must be defeated in order to even move forward in the story". The Hardcore gamer reviewer is also glad that, unlike in XCOM, there is a world to explore, rather than separate missions.

David Lloyd of NintendoWorldReport appreciated the developers who made the Switch version, but noted that the game should be probably played on stronger hardware. The nintendolife reviewer, however, claims that "In terms of performance, Mutant Year Zero: Road to Eden runs very well on Switch both in docked mode and in handheld". However he complains about blurring and pixelation, in an update to the review the portal claims the patches reduce pixelation and blurring.

The game won the award for "Game, Strategy" at the National Academy of Video Game Trade Reviewers Awards, and was nominated for "Best Use of Game Engine" at the Develop:Star Awards.

== Film adaptation ==
In August 2020, Pathfinder and HaZ Films announced that they are producing a full-length animated film based on the game. It will be rendered with Unreal Engine 4, and Hasraf Dulull will direct.
