= Kult (role-playing game) =

Horror role-playing game

Kult 4th Edition
- Designers: Petter Nallo, Robin Liljenberg
- Publishers: Helmgast AB, Cabinet Entertainment
- Publication: Fourth Edition, 2018; 8 years ago
- Genres: Horror
- Systems: Powered by the Apocalypse

Kult 3rd Edition
- Designers: Gunilla Jonsson, Michael Petersén
- Publishers: Paradox Entertainment, 7ème Cercle
- Publication: Third Edition, 2001; 25 years ago
- Genres: Horror

Kult (Swedish for "Cult", stylized as KULT) is a contemporary horror role-playing game originally created by Gunilla Jonsson and Michael Petersén with illustrations by Nils Gulliksson, first published in Sweden by Äventyrsspel (later Target Games) in 1991. Kult is notable for its philosophical and religious depth as well as for its mature and controversial content.

The first three English editions were published from 1993–2004 by Metropolis Ltd. In 2018 current licensor Helmgast released the fourth edition, Kult: Divinity Lost, created by Robin Liljenberg and Petter Nallo. This edition updated the setting from the 1990s to the 2010s and was completely rewritten with new art and layout, and a ruleset based on Powered by the Apocalypse. The fourth edition was well received by critics and fans and won two Ennies 2019.

== Setting ==
The setting and rules of Kult are heavily inspired by Gnostic myths that use the Platonic concept of the Demiurge and implications of a higher divinity of humanity that is grasped through obtaining esoteric knowledge.

The default backdrop is that of our present-day large cities. Players take the roles of contemporary protagonists from across genres, such as private investigators, femmes fatales, vigilantes, drug dealers, artists, journalists, secret agents, and mad scientists. In the game, however, the entire visible world is an illusion (the Illusion) held together by a monotheistic belief which is unravelling to reveal the darker "reality" beneath—where nightmarish monsters lurk. The Illusion was created by the Demiurge to hold humanity prisoner and to prevent us from regaining the divinity we once had. In the absence of the Demiurge, sinister forces plot to keep humanity from realizing the truth, or even to plunge the world into an apocalyptic war to restore humanity's ignorance and blind faith in the divine order.

Some symbols and creatures appearing in Kult also appear in other Swedish games to which the same authors and production team contributed. The Mutant Chronicles universe (created by Nils Gulliksson and Michael Stenmark) and its spin-offs share creatures such as Nepharites and Razides which appear in Kult.

== Rules ==
The original system is a skill-based system using a 20-sided dice (related to Chaosium's BRP system, which had already been used by Äventyrsspel for their Drakar och Demoner RPGs), with point-based characters. In the game, a natural 1 usually means a great success with added bonuses and a natural 20 means a complete failure. Normal characters usually have skill ratings of 3–20; to succeed in a skill roll, the player must roll equal to or lower than their skill. The lower the player rolls under their skill rating, the greater the success. Extraordinary characters and inhuman entities can have skill ratings far above the normal range.

The fourth edition, Kult: Divinity Lost, uses rules that are based on the Apocalypse World rules engine. Players roll two 10-sided dice, add possible modifications, and try to reach at least 10 to avoid failure or 15 to gain a complete success. Kult: Divinity Lost also has a system where the Gamemaster builds the campaign around the player characters and aims to evoke personal horror.

Over the various editions, there were several different rulesets for combat. The second and third English edition rules use a system based on Damage Effect Factors (DEF). The fourth edition, Kult: Divinity Lost, has less focus on combat than previous editions.

The magic rules in Kult are loosely inspired by real-world occult practices, such as Hermeticism, in order to heighten the setting's realism. Sorcerers can cast spells from one (or rarely more) of five different Lores: Death, Dream, Madness, Passion and Time & Space. Because these spells have (very) long casting times (up to several days); require highly specific and exacting verbal, material and somatic requirements; and can only be cast inside the sorcerer's consecrated temple, they resemble religious rituals.

=== Mental Balance ===
Early editions of the game use "Mental Balance" as a gauge of player characters' sanity. Both a high or low (+25/-25) Mental Balance affects how normal people and animals react to the character. Characters with an extremely high or low Mental Balance can transcend the Illusion and regain their lost divine status through Awakening. This occurs if Mental Balance reaches +500 or -500.

A character's mental balance can move in a positive or negative direction due to trauma, influence from creatures or places, or by advantages and disadvantages from talents or traits, such as (on the positive side) animal friendship, artistic talent, body awareness, a code of honor, or (on the negative side) social ineptitude, addiction, paranoia, or a mystic curse. The further the character strays away from the zero point, the more sociopathic, strange or eccentric they become. Characters with a very high or very low mental balance start to involuntarily manifest outward physical signs.

In the fourth edition of Kult, the mental balance system was removed, as the developers found it impractical during gameplay. Instead, characters take on different archetypes in the path toward Awakening: The Sleeper, The Aware, and The Enlightened.

== Publication history ==
Kult was originally published in Swedish by Target Games in 1991, and was later translated into German, English, Italian, Spanish and French. American game company Metropolis Ltd. published the English-language game through its first three editions, creating new supplements with a new US background, and with revised page design and editing. Terry K. Amthor left Iron Crown Enterprises in 1992 to co-found Metropolis Ltd., specifically to produce the English-language version of the game. Between 1992 and 1994, Amthor edited, co-authored and art-directed several books for the line.

The third English edition of Kult had two English books released in print form: a player's handbook named Kult Rumours in 2001 and the core rulebook, Kult: Beyond The Veil, printed in 2004. Other editions were published by 7ème Cercle (French) and Raven Distribution (Italian).

The license has been the property of first Target Games, then Paradox Entertainment, and, in 2015, Cabinet Holdings. Kult is currently licensed by Helmgast. A 2016 Kickstarter campaign funded the fourth edition of the game, Kult: Divinity Lost. This edition uses a different rules engine than previous editions, based on Apocalypse World and its Powered by the Apocalypse rules. It updates the timeline to the modern setting. The fourth edition was released in 2018.

== Supplements ==
Many supplements have been produced in both Swedish and English. Its first supplement was Legions of Darkness in 1993. The Kult GM Screen was published in 1993, and Taroticum was published in 1994. The Kult Player's Companion, Beyond the Boundaries, Heart, Mind and Soul, and the adventure The Judas Grail were published in 1996.

== Reception ==
Jeff Koke reviewed Kult for Pyramid #3 (Sept./Oct., 1993), and said, "All in all, Kult is a very good system and background for roleplayers who are mature enough to delve into truly dark roleplaying. Even for those players who dislike being immersed in depressing, hopeless worlds, the background has enough tidbits of bleak imagery and morsels of horrific scenery that it's worth the cover price just to browse through the Metropolis."

Denys Bakriges reviewed Kult in White Wolf #39 (1994), rating it a 5 out of 5 and stated that "Kult is an excellent roleplaying game. It's one of the greatest horror games released in recent years. While its mythology is steeped in Christian ideology and Jungian philosophy, its ideas are very original. However, there's a note of 'caution.' The game setting can be unremittingly bleak and depressing. This is gut-level horror. You know what you like. Take it as you will."

Lucya Szachowski reviewed Kult: Second Edition for Arcane magazine, rating it an 8 out of 10 overall, and stated that "Kult particularly appeals to people who have become a bit jaded with Lovecraft's vision of horror and want something different. If you're a dark horror fan and you haven't already got the game, give it a go."

Writing for Gizmodo, Ed Grabianowski described shopping for Kult as a teenager: " 'It's banned in Sweden,' is pretty much the best possible sales pitch you can make to a couple of 14-year-old boys. And indeed Kult turns out to be a pretty interesting, intense RPG." Grabianoski said, "Some of Kult's controversy stems from the inclusion of rape among the many horrors that could be experienced by a character. Like me, you may not be interested in dealing with those kinds of issues during a gaming session, but to its credit, Kult made it clear that rape had serious and terrible consequences for both the victim and the perpetrator." Grabianoswki concluded, "Although Kult was never a big success in North America, it still holds that strange frisson of ominous allure."

The fourth edition was well received by critics and fans and won two Ennies (for Best Writing and Best Cover) 2019, and was also nominated for Best Interior Art.

In his 2023 book Monsters, Aliens, and Holes in the Ground, RPG historian Stu Horvath said, "The characters all harbor sordid secrets that range from enduring supernatural curses to being the subject of medical experimentation to being possessed by a demon. The secrets taint the characters and, most likely, provide the means for their eventual destruction."

=== Moral panic in Sweden and Norway ===
Similar to the 1980s Dungeons & Dragons controversies in the United States, Kult figured in several Swedish moral panics during the 1990s. At the time of the game's initial publication, role-playing games in Sweden were still sold primarily through toy stores rather than bookstores or specialized hobby shops. Kult appeared in the press several times during the decade after its initial publication, and in 1997 the Kult core rules were quoted in a motion in the Parliament of Sweden. The motion was to stop taxpayer funding of youth groups that were active with role-playing games. It refers to the Bjuv murder, where a 15-year-old in the small southern town of Bjuv was killed by two friends, aged 16- and 17-years-old, who (according to the legal motion) were influenced by Kult.

Writer Didi Örnstedt and painter Björn Sjöstedt wrote a book, De Övergivnas Armé (Army of the Abandoned), where they warn against the role-playing game hobby, with a particular focus on Kult. The title refers to children supposedly ignored by their parents and therefore assumed to be susceptible to radicalization by RPGs.

Critics of role-playing games have also attempted to tie Kult to a 16-year-old Swedish boy who died by suicide with a shotgun in November 1996. The local newspaper Tønsbergs Blad in Tønsberg, Norway similarly attempted to link Kult to the disappearance of a boy called Andreas Hammer on July 1, 1994, who allegedly played Kult the week prior to his disappearance. Local police only started investigating the disappearance fourteen months later. As of 2004, the boy was still missing.

=== Moral panic in the United States ===
The game also proved controversial in the United States, where some people found its cover art (featuring a chained male angel flanked by two huge swords; the same image as for the 2nd Swedish edition) offensive enough that in some stores the game was displayed and sold in non-transparent, gray paper bags.

== Fiction ==
In 2017 Free League Publishing published Anders Fager's novel För Gudinnan (For the Love of the Goddess) set in the Kult universe. Fager has also written a short audiobook called "Faraday", set in the Kult adventure Tarroticum.

In 2018 and 2020, Free League Publishing published two novels written by the original creators of Kult, Gunilla Jonsson and Michael Petersén. They are both set in the Kult universe called Döden är bara början (Death Is Only the Beginning, 2018) and De levande döda (The Living Dead, 2020)

== Spin-offs ==
- Kult (card game) by Bryan Winter.
- In August–November 2011, Dark Horse Comics released a four-issue mini series based on the RPG.
