= Primordial Soup (board game) =

Board game

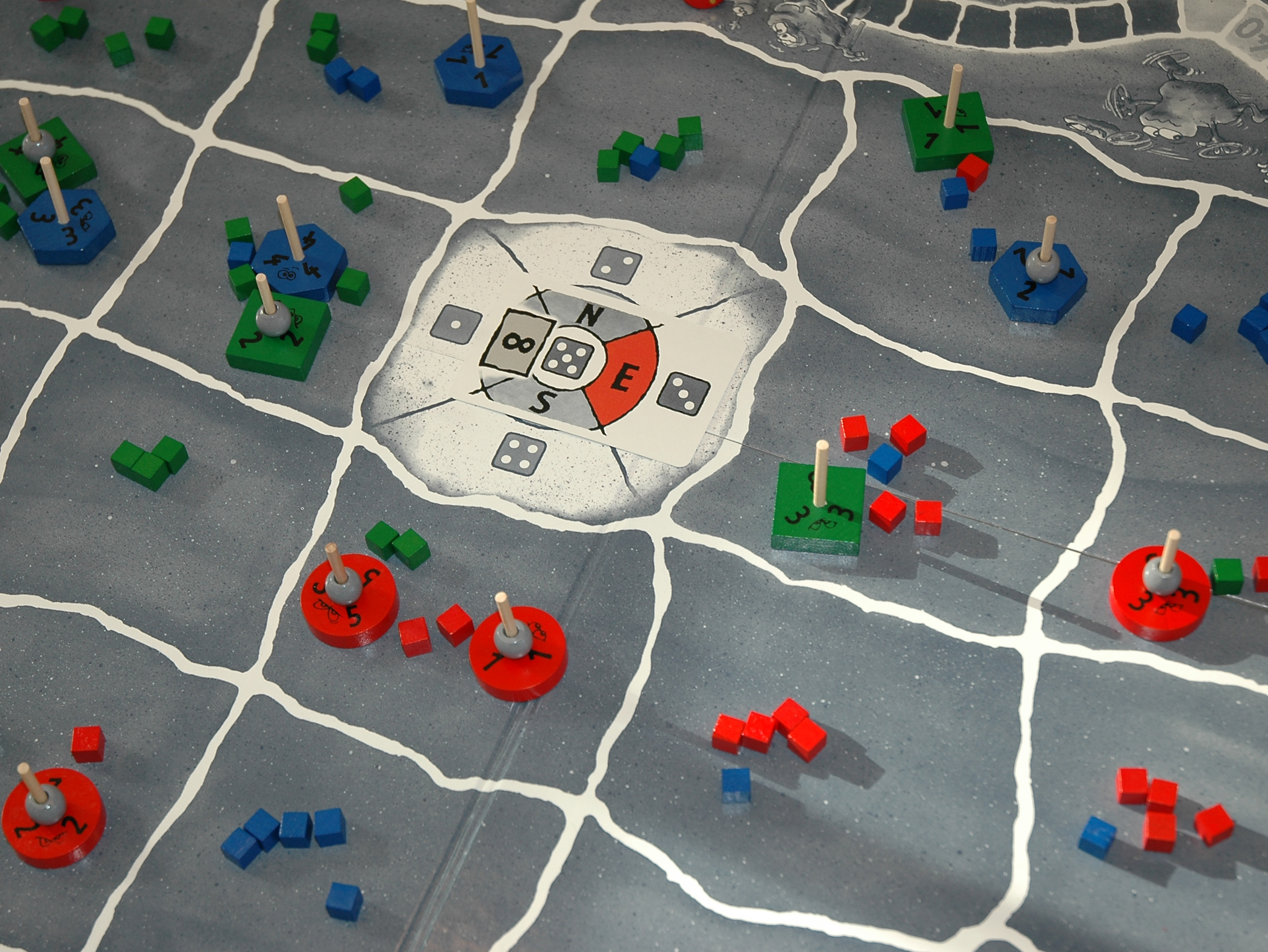
- Close-up of a game in progress
- Designers: Doris Matthäus & Frank Nestel
- Players: 3 to 4 (5-6 with extension)
- Setup time: approx. 10 minutes
- Playing time: 90+ minutes
- Chance: Medium
- Age range: 12 years and up
- Skills: Dice rolling, Bidding, Capture

Primordial Soup is a board game designed by Doris Matthäus & Frank Nestel and published by Z-Man Games. It was first published in 1997 in Germany by Doris & Frank under the name Ursuppe and this original version won 2nd prize in the 1998 Deutscher Spiele Preis.

== Theme ==
Each player guides a species of primitive amoeba drifting through the primordial soup. The player controls whether and how their amoebas move, eat and procreate using the 10 biological points which s/he receives each turn. A player may evolve their species by buying gene cards, which give the amoebas abilities such as faster movement. The abilities are pictured on the gene cards, showing amoebas growing fins, tentacles, spines, etc.

A key feature of the game is its self-balancing ecosystem. The food required by each amoeba is a mixture of the excrement of the other players' species. Food may become scarce and cause amoebas to starve, die and decompose into food. If one species becomes scarce, this will then cause problems for the other players, since their amoebas depend on all the other species to supply their food. Genes may mitigate this, for example by turning a species into a predator. However, this still requires some healthy prey to be available. Furthermore, the other players may react by turning their amoebas into predators themselves, growing spines for defense, or simply increase their procreation rate to offset the losses. The success of each strategy highly depends on the other players' actions as each species evolves to fill ecological niches.

== Objective ==
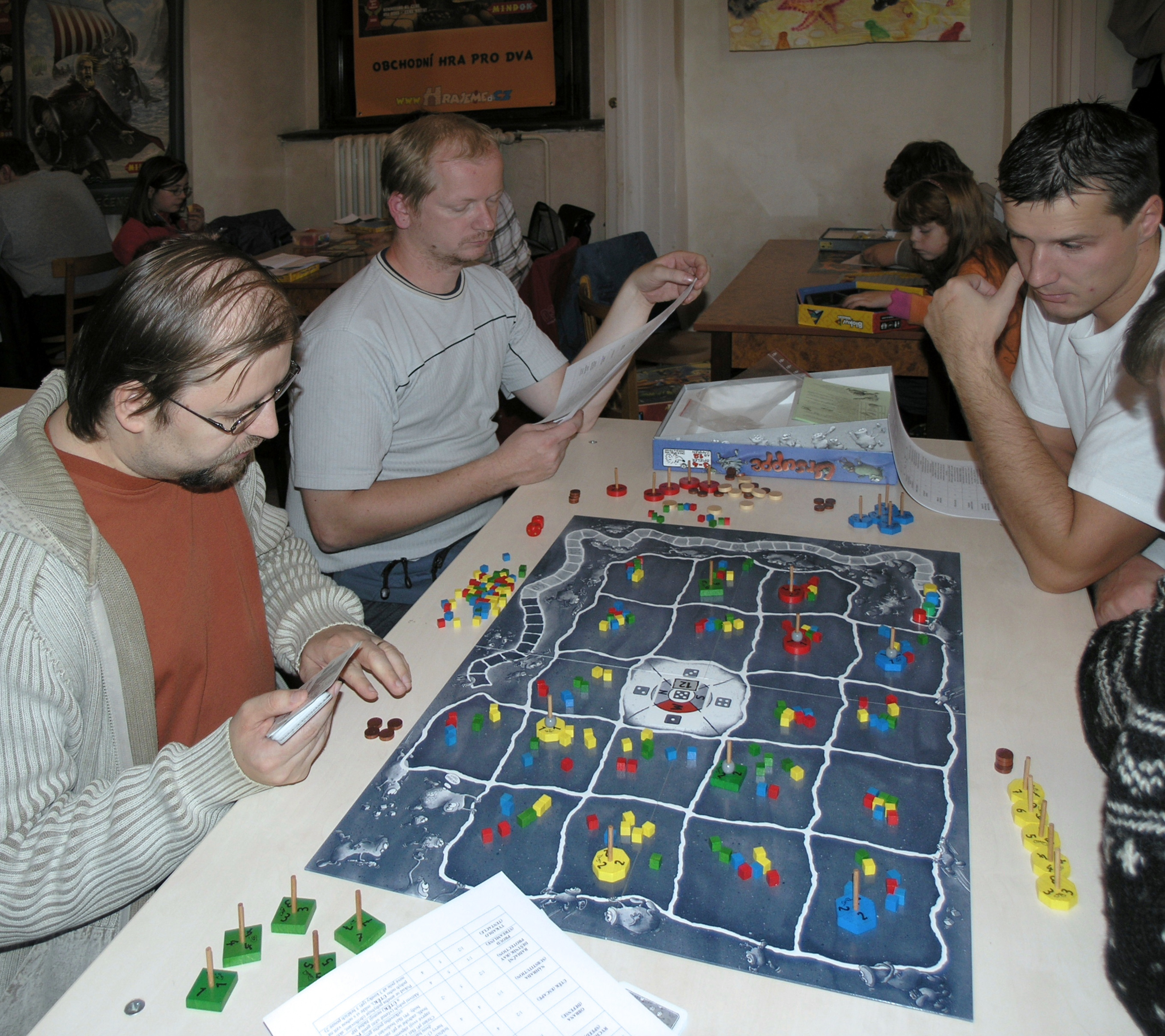
Primordial Soup

Each turn each species scores points based upon its population and genes. The game ends when a player reaches 42 points or when the last environment card is drawn. This usually happens after 5-10 rounds so the game lasts 1–2 hours.

== Equipment ==
- A game board with spaces representing the primordial soup, a scoring track, and a compass diagram.
- Two dice.
- 28 pegged discs representing amoebas, in four sets of different colors and shapes.
- 37 biological point tokens.
- 25 beads for marking damage.
- 55 foodstuff cubes in each color.
- 4 score markers.
- 33 gene cards.
- 11 environment cards which indicate the direction of drift and the thickness of the ozone layer.
- Game rules and reference sheets.

== Reception ==
The reviewer from Pyramid #29 (Jan./Feb., 1998) stated that "Ursuppe is a very fine, fun game for three or four players from the game design company/team of Doris & Frank."

Ursuppe came in 2nd for the Deutscher Spiele Preis in 1998.

The game won the "Family strategy" Games 100 in 2006.

== Reviews ==
- Games #212 (Vol 29, #6) 2005 August
