= Cabinet Entertainment =

Company dealing in intellectual properties and motion pictures

- Formerly: Paradox Entertainment Inc. (1999-2015)
- Predecessor: Target Games
- Founded: 2015; 11 years ago
- Founder: Fredrik Malmberg
- Headquarters: Los Angeles, United States
- Owner: Funcom (2021-present)
- Parent: Cabinet Group
- Subsidiaries: Conan Properties International

Cabinet Entertainment, previously known as Paradox Entertainment, is a company dealing in intellectual properties and making motion pictures thereof. All business is conducted from the main office in Los Angeles, United States. The company was founded in 2015 by CEO Fredrik Malmberg, previously co-founder of Swedish role-playing game publishing house Target Games and CEO of Paradox Entertainment.

Some of its most famous holdings are trademarks and certain rights related to Conan the Barbarian, a character created by pulp author Robert E. Howard and expanded upon by many other authors over the years. Cabinet owns these rights through Conan Properties International, a wholly owned subsidiary. Other properties held by Cabinet Entertainment include Bran Mak Morn, Kull, Solomon Kane, Mutant, Mutant Chronicles, Warzone, Kult, and Chronopia. Former licences include Heavy Gear.

Cabinet Entertainment is now owned by Tencent via Funcom.

== History ==
Paradox Entertainment started out in 1999, created from the bankrupted Target Games (known at that time as "Target Games Interactive"), a Swedish role-playing games company.

In 2004, the company moved its business to Los Angeles. At this time, the Stockholm operation was spun off into Paradox Interactive.

Paradox Entertainment claims that the company owns the rights to all of Robert E. Howard's stories and characters.

On August 21, 2011, the day the 2011 film Conan the Barbarian opened, SLMI (Stan Lee Media Inc.) unsuccessfully sued Paradox Entertainment, Conan Sales Co., Arthur Lieberman, and others over the rights to Conan, as they claim Conan was improperly transferred to Conan Sales Co. and sold to Paradox.

In 2012, rights for Conan movie sequels reverted from Millennium Films Inc. to Conan Properties International, a wholly owned subsidiary of Paradox Entertainment.

In 2015, Cabinet Entertainment, a new company of CEO Fredrik Malmberg (through Cabinet Holdings), acquired Paradox Entertainment Inc. and all subsidiaries and their properties, including the Robert E. Howard properties Conan, Kull, and Solomon Kane, as well as the original Target/Paradox properties Mutant Chronicles/Warzone, Kult, Chronopia, and Mutant. The purchase price for all shares in PEINC amounted to $7 million in cash.

In April 2018, Cabinet joined with video game publisher Funcom to set up Heroic Signatures, an outfit intended to develop Cabinet's intellectual properties into video games.

In September 2020, it was announced that Netflix will develop a new Conan TV series as a part of a larger deal involving Fredrik Malmberg and Mark Wheeler from Pathfinder Media (Note: No relation to Pathfinder, Paizo's flagship product.) between Netflix and Conan Properties International, owned by Cabinet Entertainment, for the exclusive rights to their Conan library for the rights for live-action and animated films and TV shows.

In September 2021, Funcom acquired Cabinet Group, the parent company to Cabinet Entertainment. Funcom, which had already developed and published games based on intellectual properties under license from Cabinet, planned to continue to expand on these properties with the acquisition. Cabinet founder Fredrik Malmberg will become president of Heroic Signatures.

== Other company connections ==
Cabinet Entertainment used to be publicly listed in Stockholm, Sweden. The company called Paradox Entertainment listed on OMX Nasdaq is now called Sensori AB and dealt in medical supplies, until it entered into liquidation on 31 August 2020. Specifically, Paradox Entertainment AB (the Swedish, listed, company) sold off all its operations to Paradox Entertainment Inc. (its American subsidiary). The Swedish company acquired its new medical operations by buying Akloma Tinnitus AB and changing its name, while the American company was purchased by its previous CEO Fredrik Malmberg through Cabinet.

Paradox Interactive, based in Stockholm, is a completely separate entity, no longer a part of Paradox Entertainment.

=== RPG licenses ===
Conan is licensed to Modiphius. Kult is licensed to Helmgast. Mutant is licensed to Free League.

== Filmography ==
Includes producer and executive producer credits for Cabinet CEO, Fredrik Malmberg.

- Mutant Chronicles (2008)
- Solomon Kane (2009)
- Conan the Barbarian (2011)
- Setup (2011)
- Freelancers (2012)
- Fire with Fire (2012)
- Ain't Them Bodies Saints (2012)
- Reasonable Doubt (2014)
- The Frozen Ground (2013)
- Reclaim (2014)
