= Warzone (game) =

Tabletop game

- Designers: Bill King
- Publishers: Target Games
- Players: 2 or more
- Setup time: variable
- Playing time: > about 1 hour
- Chance: High
- Skills: Strategic thought

Warzone is a tabletop miniature wargame based on the Mutant Chronicles universe and role-playing game. It features squad-based combat at a skirmish level, although vehicles and large models were introduced in later supplements to the main rule book.

Designed by Bill King, the game was initially produced by Epic Games, a subsidiary of Target Games. As a result of a restructuring at Target Games, the rights to Warzone were sold to Paradox Entertainment in December 1999. In 2020 Paradox sold the rights to Res Nova, which announced its intention to develop a new edition of the game. In 2023 Res Nova launched a Kickstarter campaign for its new edition of Warzone, named Warzone Eternal.

== Setting ==
Warzone takes place in a fictional dieselpunk future in which a space faring humanity has explored beyond Pluto and has uncovered ancient artifacts which unleashed an evil entity known as the Dark Soul and an obscure magical force known as the Dark Symmetry. This force soon started corrupting both man and thinking machines, instilling hatred and fear in their minds, then sent its own minions, consisting of legions of undead mutants and alien monsters called Nefarites, in an attempt to conquer humanity. In light of these events, technological and social progress has largely come to a halt. Most people are citizens of one of the major megacorporations, who have colonized the inner planets of the Solar System, and who fight against each other when not fighting the evil forces of the Dark Soul. The Earth has become known as Dark Eden following a global apocalypse, and it is home only to tribal survivors and renegades. This background is intricately tied to that of the Mutant Chronicles role-playing game.

== Gameplay ==
Warzone is a tabletop miniature wargame in which players take turns issuing orders, moving model troops on a model battlefield, and resolving combats that occur by rolling dice. It is played at the skirmish scale, where one model represents one soldier. The game became gradually more complex with later editions and expansions adding more details and special abilities.

Warzone is mostly compared and contrasted to Warhammer 40,000, which targets the same market audience, and has similar gameplay, although Warzone never reached the latter's volume of market penetration. Warzone aims for a more realistic feel, being set in a more plausible future, with recognizable weaponry, megacorporations that represent modern-day nations and cultures, and a focus upon the power of units of soldiers, whereas Warhammer aims for more of a fantasy feel, with a greater variety of weapons, aliens, and a predominant focus upon the power of individual heroes.

== Editions ==
The supplement Warzone: Dawn of War was published in 1996, and Warzone: Beasts of War was published in 1997.

Five different editions of Warzone have been produced through the years: the original Warzone, Warzone 2nd Edition, Ultimate Warzone in 1998, Warzone Resurrection in 2013, and Warzone Eternal is in development as of 2023.

During the production of the third supplement for Warzone 2nd Edition, Target Games underwent a significant restructuring which resulted in the establishment of Paradox Entertainment as an independent company and the license for the Warzone brand being sold to them. Development and production of the Warzone line was not resumed after the disruption and a license to use the brand in the context of miniature wargaming was awarded to Excelsior Entertainment Owned by Thom Talamini and Christopher Schroeder (as well as licenses for the related Chronopia brand).

The remaining stocks of original Warzone and Chronopia miniatures were sold to Irish company Prince August, who still have copies of the boxed game and supplements of the second edition in stock. The original moulds were destroyed.

In 2008 Fantasy Flight Games released a 54mm collectible miniature game set in the Mutant Chronicles universe, but the game was cancelled shortly after release due to poor sales.

A new edition of Warzone was unveiled in February 2013 by Prodos Games (under licence to Paradox Entertainment). It is called Warzone Resurrection. However Warzone Resurrection was discontinued by Prodos Games in 2018 because they were not able to find an agreement with Cabinet Entertainment, the rights holder and licensor of the Warzone franchise. The last miniatures of Warzone Resurrection were sold on the 9th of October 2018 on the Prodos webshop.

In 2023, Res Nova Games LLC. launched a Kickstarter campaign for Warzone Eternal. This edition will focus on objective-based, skirmish combat on a 3'x 3' play area.

== Video Game ==
An Online Real-Time Strategy game was in development after Paradox Entertainment had acquired the license but the production was quietly shut down. The game would have been called Warzone Online and would have featured a then brand new Game Engine called the Valpurgius Engine. It would have been released on both the Xbox and Windows platforms.

== Reception ==
Mark Donald reviewed Warzone for Arcane magazine, rating it a 6 out of 10 overall. Donald comments that "Warzone is worth investigating, especially if you already swear by the RPG. However, I wouldn't recommend it to serious megalomaniacs who live for wargaming."

Pyramid magazine reviewed Warzone and stated that "As promised on the cover, Warzone plays fast and furious. Game turns flow very quickly and tend to be very violent."

Warzone won the Origins Award for Best Miniatures Rules of 1995.

== Reviews ==
- Backstab #9 (Beasts of War, as "Les bêtes de guerre")
- Backstab #14
- Casus Belli #96
- Australian Realms #28
