= American Megafauna =

Board game

American Megafauna is a board game on the topic of evolution designed by Phil Eklund, and published by Sierra Madre Games in 1997. While the game is not an attempt to be a simulation, a variety of genuine evolutionary factors are incorporated in the game, ranging from Milankovich cycles to dentition. The game can be played in a solitaire mode as well as multi-player. It has subsequently gone out of print.

In late 2011, Bios: Megafauna was released by Sierra Madre Games, essentially as a replacement for American Megafauna. This is a more streamlined version of American Megafauna, using some of the same design concepts, and being much more accessible. Playing time was reduced also, yet this new release retains its strong solitaire mode, as well as accommodating 2-4 players. It is a semi-scientific simulation in the same vein as Sierra Madre Games' 2010 popular release, High Frontier (board game).

The game begins after the Permian-Triassic extinction event of 250 million years ago, which killed off 95% of all living species on Earth. Players can choose to begin the game as one of 4 Archetype species that start as herbivores, but can mutate into predators. Both mammals and dinosaurs are represented. There is a huge (almost endless) variety of species that can evolve via DNA chains, and the random tile map board setup is constantly changing due to certain random events (e.g., Erosion, Greenhouse and icehouse Earth, and Milankovich cycles), Catastrophes (e.g., an Impact event or a solar flare), and the addition of new Biome tiles during play.

The map itself (represented by tiles that are turned over and revealed) consists of a wide variety of land, sea, mountain, and other Biomes in four different latitudes. The goal of the game is to adapt your DNA, speciate, and survive amidst both environmental and living animal competition (represented by other players and wandering Immigrant animals that encroach upon the continent). Play time varies between 60–180 minutes depending on the number of participants and various rules being utilized.

The next title in the series, Bios: Genesis (abiogenisis, the origins of life on Earth) was released in 2016.
