= Dark Eden =

Collectible card game

Dark Eden Trading Card Game
- Card back of the Dark Eden CCG
- Designers: Bryan Winter
- Publishers: Target Games
- Players: 2-4
- Playing time: Approx 30 min
- Chance: Some
- Age range: 12+
- Skills: Card playing Arithmetic; Basic Reading Ability

Dark Eden is also a fortress in the Legacy of Kain series of video games
Dark Eden is also a novel by Chris Beckett.

Dark Eden is an out-of-print collectible card game designed by Bryan Winter and published by Target Games.

== Description ==
Dark Eden is set in the post-apocalyptic universe of the Mutant Chronicles role-playing game, among the tribes on the ravaged planet Earth.

== Publication history ==
Two expansion sets named Genesis (120 cards) and Exodus were planned but never released. Dark Eden was first released in April 1997.

The original set was sold in 60-card starter decks and 15-card booster packs.

== Reception ==
Paul Pettengale reviewed Dark Eden for Arcane magazine, rating it an 8 out of 10 overall, and stated that "Dark Eden is far better than you'd expect it to be. It does take some initial slog to get into, mainly due to the complexity of the game, but the rulebook's written so well that queries are quickly settled. With plenty of long-term play prospects (deck building will take you ages to perfect), and, hopefully, support in the way of expansion sets, I can see this becoming a minor cult classic with those gamers that take the time to learn how well it plays."

== Reviews ==
- Backstab (Issue 3 - May/Jun 1997)
- Magia i Miecz (Issue 40 - Apr 1997) (Polish)
- Świat Gier Komputerowych #63 (Polish)
