= Eon (role-playing game) =

Role-playing game

- Eon Player's Handbook 3rd edition cover
- Designers: Marco Behrmann, Dan Johansson, Petter Nallo, Carl Johan Ström, Krister Sundelin
- Publishers: Helmgast AB, Neogames
- Publication: 1996 (First Edition)
- Genres: Fantasy
- Systems: Custom

Eon is a fantasy role-playing game set in the fictitious world of Mundana. It is developed and published by Swedish company Helmgast. Eon is the Swedish word for aeon.

== History ==
The first edition was released on November 18, 1996, the second edition on November 29, 2000, and the third edition on August 27, 2004. The fourth edition was released sometime in November 2014. In a comparison in Dagens Nyheter of four Swedish fantasy role-playing games, the first edition of Eon received the highest marks of the four with the comments "Advanced rules - Realistic", "Great joy of play", "Plausible. Down to earth", "Not for beginners. Detailed. Endless campaign seeds. High class without losing the fantasy feeling."

A computer game called EON - The Face of Deception was planned, but not released.
