= Close Action =

Board game

Close Action is a naval board wargame published by Clash of Arms in 1997 and designed by Mark A. Campbell. The game replicates naval warfare of the 18th and early 19th centuries. The game was inspired by and shares superficial similarities to the Avalon Hill game Wooden Ships and Iron Men (WS&IM). It was created chiefly in response to perceived errors in the simulation found in WS&IM.

== History ==
Close Action was first imagined in the 1980s by Mark Campbell and other avid Wooden Ships and Iron Men players as a "fix" to WS&IM's unrealistic simulation of Age of Reason naval combat. Campbell, while retaining many superficial similarities to Wooden Ships and Iron Men, changed the game mechanics significantly in order to create a more realistic simulation of period naval conflict, and the initial rule set was published by Tempest games in 1987. Over a decade was spent designing the game and play-testing in both small and large games, chiefly along the Eastern Coast of the United States. Close Action was finally published by Clash of Arms in 1997.

== Basics ==
Close Action is broken up into turns, which are broken up further into phases. Phases of a turn in Close Action include:

- Phase one is the movement plotting phase, where the players plot movement for the turn, and ship captains and admirals write messages to be delivered later in the turn.
- Phase two is the movement phase, where movement is resolved. This is a generally straightforward phase, though there are occasional collisions which must be resolved in this phase.
- Phase three is the fire plotting phase, where the players plot fire on enemy ships, calculating the distance, their own morale rating, and the ship class.
- Phase four is the fire resolution phase, where dice are rolled and damage caused during the firing phase is recorded.
- Phase five is when all other types of less important things occur, such as fixing rigging or hull, grappling or un-grappling from another ship, firefighting, and boarding actions
- Phase six is when the messages written during phase one are delivered to the rest of the fleet, and the turn ends.

== "Monster" games ==
Close Action, though it is at its basis a tabletop wargame with only a few players, is considered especially good with large fleet actions, replicated by numbers of players generally in the tens and twenties, but sometimes expanding into the forties or larger. (Since the game mechanics have all players simultaneously plot their movement, fire, and limited communication via signals, larger numbers of players do not slow down the game waiting for each player in sequence to have a turn.) There are usually large monster games played at the Historical Miniatures Gaming Society conventions in Lancaster, PA, and at other wargaming conventions.

Many monster games are played on a massive hex-grid with 2-inch hexes rather than the standard hex-grid which comes with the game. In these monster games, famous, infamous, obscure, or even semi-fantasy battles are fought between fleets. The ideal ratio of ships to players is 1:1, though this is usually not entirely achieved. Mark Campbell himself runs many monster games, including the Trafalgar Day games, which are the largest monster-games, being upwards of 40-50 players. On the first Trafalgar Day game, held in 2005 one day after the 200th anniversary of the Battle of Trafalgar, there were 60+ players in attendance, and there were (on rare occasions) even more players than ships.

== Criticism ==
The main criticism of Close Action is the apparent complication of its rules, which are far more complex than those in Wooden Ships and Iron Men.

Other criticisms are the lack of fleet level morale rules and the tendency of most ships to fight on until completely wrecked. In addition, there are no command control rules other than having a separate player for each ship.

== Supplements ==
The main Close Action ruleset is accompanied by two supplements. The first, entitled "Rebel Seas" comprises scenarios covering the American War of Independence, as well as providing some additional and amended rules. The second, "Monsoon Seas" covers the naval campaigns in India in the 1780s, notably the actions fought between British Admiral Hughes and French Admiral Suffren.
