= Tinker's Damn =

1997 tabletop game

Tinker's Damn is a 1997 role-playing game published by Studio Cranium.

== Gameplay ==
Tinker's Damn is a game in which an anime‑inspired, effects‑based universal role-playing game uses d20 and d6, and lets players mix genres, design worlds, and explore sample campaigns with guidance from quirky mascots Allison and Mittens.

== Reviews ==
- Pyramid
- Science Fiction Age
