= Solarquest =

Board game

SolarQuest
- A portion of the game board of SolarQuest (first edition)
- Players: 2–6
- Setup time: 5–15 minutes
- Playing time: 1-3 hours
- Chance: medium-dice, cards
- Skills: Simple mathematics, such as counting, finding percentages, and multiplication; Tactics; Strategy; Social skills; and Negotiation

SolarQuest is a space-age real estate trading board game published in 1985 and developed by Valen Brost, who conceived the idea in 1976. The game is patterned after Monopoly, but it replaces pewter tokens with rocket ships and hotels with metallic fuel stations. Players travel around the Sun acquiring monopolies of planets, moons, and man-made space structures. They seek to knock their opponents out of the game through bankruptcy, as well as optional laser blasts and dwindling fuel supplies.

SolarQuest has attracted a renewed following in recent years due to its availability on eBay and other auction sites. Brost ran a successful Kickstarter campaign (November 8 – December 25, 2016) to fund his new release of SolarQuest, expected to enter production in 2017. This "Deluxe Edition" will include more up-to-date astronomical data, a magnetic Fuel Tank Card (preventing the accidental movement of its metal markers), modernized graphics, and enhanced gameplay.

== Gameplay (original 1985/1987 versions) ==
=== Mission ===
Players travel through the Solar System acquiring properties, charging rent, and building fuel stations within individual planetary systems. The winner is the player who builds the greatest financial empire and "survives the perils of space travel to become the last player on the board," according to the 1986 SolarQuest rules.

=== Game board ===
A journey around the Sun encompasses:

- 33 moons;
- 9 planets, of which 5 can be landed on;
- 9 federation stations;
- 6 research labs; and
- 5 space docks.

Players roll dice and travel along a blue flight path from planet to planet. There are also Red Shift cards directing players to specific destinations (e.g. Advance to Mars).

Players can buy planets and moons, and trade with one another to acquire monopolies. They can also build fuel stations on these bodies, and charge fees for refueling. Each planet has a deed card with instructions on rent and fuel costs.

Research labs and space docks are similar to the utilities in Monopoly. Federation stations cannot be owned, but offer an opportunity to collect cash and purchase spare fuel stations.

There are also 16 black dots, representing planets' gravity, and 17 blue dots, representing floating in space. Altogether, the board has a total of 91 spaces (compared to Monopoly's 40).

=== Color groups ===
The color groups are:

- Orange (Jupiter's moons): Callisto, Ganymede, Io, Europa, Amalthea, Himalia, Elara, Thebe, Metis, Adrastea, Sinope.
- Yellow (Saturn's moons): Titan, Rhea, Iapetus, Dione, Tethys, Enceladus, Mimas, Hyperion, Phoebe, Janus.
- Turquoise (Uranus' moons): Oberon, Titania, Ariel, Umbriel, Miranda, 1985 U1.
- Red: Mars, Phobos, Deimos.
- Pink: Pluto, Charon.
- Blue (Neptune's moons): Triton, Nereid.
- Purple: Venus.
- Gold: Mercury.
- Green: Earth (cannot be purchased), Moon.
- Grey: Earth Research Lab, Neptune Research Lab, Uranus Research Lab, Venus Research Lab, Jupiter Research Lab, Saturn Research Lab.
- White: Solar Space Dock, Neptune Space Dock, Saturn Space Dock, Uranus Space Dock, Jupiter Space Dock.

=== Fuel ===
Players have to watch their fuel level carefully since getting stranded with no way to refuel means the loss of the game. Fuel is only used when leaving a planet or moon. According to the rules, "This occurs because the ship must escape the gravitational pull of the planet or moon." Thus, fuel is not used when leaving a manmade satellite or an empty space.

It is always good to have spare fuel stations on hand. If a player runs out of fuel after landing on a planet that has no fuel station, they can force the sale of the property, build a fuel station, and replenish their fuel tank.

=== Laser battles ===
A suggested variation is that players who are close enough to each other can fire lasers. A roll of doubles damages the ship, allowing the aggressor to charge for repairs. A roll of double sixes completely destroys the opposing ship, knocking them out of the game.

=== Red shift ===
==== Basic Solarquest ====
A Red Shift card is drawn when a player rolls doubles. For the Apollo 13 edition, redshift cards are only drawn when a one and a three are rolled, greatly reducing the amount of redshift cards drawn during gameplay. Rolling doubles allows for a second turn and a $100 Federon reward instead. These are similar to the Chance or Community Chest cards in Monopoly. The 36 Red Shift cards consist of:

- 25 cards directing the player to a specific destination (e.g. Advance to Federation Station II orbiting Jupiter – use 1 hydron of fuel)
- 3 cards in the Red Shift series (e.g. Red Shift 4 – Roll dice – Move 4 times the number rolled – use 4 hydrons of fuel)
- 5 cards awarding or taking away property (e.g. A player wins a dispute with the Federation League – choose any unowned property and assume ownership from the Federation)
- 3 miscellaneous cards (e.g. Discover new comet – Collect $400 (Roll Again)).

==== Strategic Solarquest ====
The rules also provide for an "Advanced Play" variant known as Strategic Solarquest in which Red Shift cards are only drawn if double sixes are rolled. If another set of doubles is rolled (e.g. 1-1, 2-2, etc.) the player collects 100 federons, moves the number of spaces corresponding to the pips on the dice, and then has the option of either landing on that space or "bypassing" it and rolling again. Bypassing it means that the player does not pay rent, expend fuel when leaving the space, or do the other usual things associated with landing; instead, they continue their turn, rolling the dice and moving again from the bypassed space. Lasers can be fired when bypassing.

In Strategic Solarquest, the players' mobility is diminished because most Red Shift cards cause the player to jump around the board to a different location. This can be good or bad – good, if the player is trying to continue orbiting a planet, buying up properties; bad, if the player ends up paying high rents because they are stuck in orbit around a planet whose moons are mostly owned by another player.

=== Comparison with Monopoly ===
Solarquest is a relatively complex game, with 48 properties available for purchase (compared to Monopoly's 28), and the additional considerations of fuel and lasers. The player's path is not as linear as in Monopoly, since it is possible to continue travelling around a planet for several orbits before finally escaping its gravity. Still, the basic concepts are the same, and experience shows it is easy to learn for anyone who has played Monopoly.

Like Monopoly, this game can theoretically go on indefinitely as cash accumulates and it becomes difficult to force bankruptcy.

== History ==
=== 1985 and 1987 editions ===
SolarQuest was first published by Valen Brost Game Company in 1985, and then by Golden/Western Publishing Company in 1987 with minor rule revisions. For instance, in the 1985 edition, refueling on earth cost $25 per hydron; the 1987 rules provided, "If you land on Earth you may also refuel for free as a welcome home gift from the Federation." Another example is that the 1985 rules allowed the player to collect $500 for passing on Earth and $1,000 for landing on Earth; the 1987 rules provided that "Every time you land on or pass Earth you collect $500 Federons from the bank."

=== Major competition ===
In 1994, the game and puzzle division of Western Publishing was purchased by Hasbro (parent company of Parker Brothers, the makers of Monopoly) who were then controlling 80% of the U.S. board game market, and they chose to market a Star Wars Monopoly edition instead of SolarQuest. The Monopoly brand was thus strengthened, while SolarQuest was effectively blocked from the board game market.

=== Apollo 13 edition ===
In 1995, Universal Games released an Apollo 13 edition featuring artwork from the 1995 Universal Pictures film Apollo 13. Some differences between the 1995 edition and earlier versions include:

- A slightly smaller playing board that now folds into a square instead of into a rectangle.
- New red shift cards allowing three free laser bursts at any player on the board.
- Elimination of refueling on an unowned planet that has been sold back to the Federation with a fuel station on it; under the new rules, a player cannot refuel unless they purchase the property from the Federation for the deed price plus $500 for the fuel station placed by the previous owner.
- Six more moons to buy around Neptune.
- Increased purchase costs for most moons.
- For several planets, a reduction in rent when many moons are owned (for example, rent on Ganymede if a player has eleven moons of Jupiter is $4,630, instead of $7,400).
- At several Federation Stations, an increase in the amount of Federons that players collect (for example, $800 instead of $200 at Federation Station II).
- Red shifts occur only when the player rolls a three and a one on the dice.

=== Spaceopoly ===
A highly simplified spinoff was published in 1997 by Valen Brost Game Co called Spaceopoly. A bit like Monopoly, players travel round the board (representing the solar system) trying to build monopolies, whilst avoiding the perils of space travel. It has secret mission cards, similar to Risk, specifying an assignment that the player can complete to win the game. The rules contain quirky provisions; for example, the last sentence of the rule on laser battles reads: "If an opponent fires a laser at your ship and rolls 12 (i.e., double sixes), your ship is totally disabled and you are out of the game. Your attacker wins all of your money and property. Exception: If you hold the 'Invented a new force field' mission card you survive the attack and automatically win the game!"

=== Computerized versions ===
No computerized versions have been authorized for development by Valen Brost.

== Reception ==
In the August 1997 edition of Dragon (Issue 238), Rick Swan reviewed the 1997 re-release and noted, despite its similarities to Monopoly, that "the rules are surprisingly sophisticated." Swan also liked the high production values of the components, calling the overall effect "lavish".
