= Neogames =

Tabletop role-playing game publisher

- Industry: Tabletop role-playing game publisher
- Founder: Carl Johan Ström
- Headquarters: Gothenburg, Sweden
- Key people: Moti Malul (CEO)
- Owner: Aristocrat Leisure; (2024–present)

Neogames is a Swedish role-playing game publisher situated in Gothenburg. They were, after the re-creation of Target Games, the largest RPG publisher in Sweden.

The company is known for developing the three first editions of the fantasy RPG license Eon, a role-playing game set in a fairly standard fantasy setting with elves, dwarves, and magic. Its product line also includes the cyberpunk role-playing game Neotech.

On April 25, 2024, eighteen years after its headquarters moved to Gotland after being sold to Kim Vässmar, Neogames was acquired by Aristocrat Leisure for approximately $1.2 billion. Founded by Carl Johan Ström, it has published several fantasy novels by Andreas Roman and Dan Hörning, most of them linked to the world of Eon.

== History ==
NeoGames was established in 2014 following a spin‑off from Aspire Global, with its initial management—the same team behind Aspire’s iLottery business—taking leadership of the independent firm. Founding shareholders, including Barak Matalon and Aharon Aran, had major stakes in both companies and continued to hold board roles post‑spin‑off.

In mid 2022 NeoGames completed a tender offer to acquire Aspire Global plc, acquiring approximately 99.3 % of its shares. The transaction was funded through €187.7 million in debt financing from Blackstone Advisors, €13.8 million overfund facility, cash and the issuance of approximately 7.6 million new NeoGames shares, and aimed to combine iGaming and iLottery platforms under one group.

On April 24–25, 2024 NeoGames S.A. underwent a continuation, relocating its legal seat from Luxembourg to the Cayman Islands, changing its incorporation to a Cayman‑exempted company, and renaming itself to Neo Group Ltd..The same day it merged with its subsidiary Merger Sub, becoming a wholly‑owned subsidiary of Aristocrat Leisure Limited, which triggered plans to delist from NASDAQ and terminate U.S. filing obligations.

== Corporate and business structure ==
=== Corporate Structure and Governance ===
Several founding shareholders of NeoGames, owning approximately 51 % of the company, have the authority to nominate up to half of the board members and serve concurrently on Aspire Global’s board, creating a notable potential for related‑party conflicts in governance decisions.

=== Business Operations and Services ===
NeoGames primarily delivers end‑to‑end iLottery solutions tailored to state‑regulated lotteries, offering platform technology, content, aggregation services, and managed operations across multiple jurisdictions.

== Mergers & Acquisitions ==
Aristocrat Leisure completed its acquisition of Neo Group Ltd. (formerly NeoGames) on April 25, 2024 at a price of USD 29.50 per share, valuing the deal at approximately USD 1.2 billion. This transaction positioned Aristocrat and Neo as a global supplier of iLottery and iGaming content and technology.
