= Multiverser =

- Designers: Ed R. Jones & Mark Joseph Young
- Publishers: Valdron, Inc.
- Publication: 1997
- Genres: Fantasy/Science fiction
- Systems: Custom

Multiverser is a tabletop multi-genre role-playing game, published by Valdron Inc., in which the player character is typically an alternate version of the player themselves. The player character travels to a new dimension every time they die. Each dimension is governed by rules called 'biases' which determine what actions are possible or not possible in any given dimension. The dimensions, more commonly called 'worlds', may feature any setting and plot the referee can think up from swords-and-sorcery to sci-fi.

== Scriff ==

When a new player begins a game for the first time, the referee describes an imagined scenario in which the player himself dies in some sort of accident typically involving electronics. From this event, the player character is inadvertently infused with scriff. This fictional substance gets into player characters, with the result that death is not the end, but merely the perhaps painful step to the next world and the next adventure. The player begins the game controlling his alternate self in a new dimension just as he does every time his character dies. In this way, Multiverser uses death as a means of continuing the story, rather than ending it. The act of interdimensional travel, most typically upon death, as an effect of a scriff infusion is called versing out. Any character who travels through dimensions in this manner, NPC or player-controlled, is called a verser.

== Biases ==
Reality within individual dimensions is governed by four different bias categories: Body, Technology, Psionics, and Magic. Every skill has a score, or bias level, organized under one of the four bias categories, and every world has a bias level in each of the bias categories. The interactions of these biases play multiple roles: modifiers on the chance of skill success, a limiter on what is possible in the current universe, a definition of what is known by the locals, a bonus or penalty to the chance to learn something new, et al. The four bias categories defined below.

- Body (a.k.a. 'bod') refers to bio-chemistry and organics (this includes inorganic life-forms as well), defining what is possible for organic life in a given world. Skills of this bias include grapples, acrobatics, Iron Shirt, bioluminescence, regeneration, etc. A given world's Bod bias governs the presence and complexity of the world's chemical and/or organic inhabitants as well as the success rate of any attempted bod skills.
- Technology (a.k.a. 'tech') refers primarily to traditional physics and the behavior of equipment and machines. This bias governs a character's ability to operate simple machines, watches, guns, lighters, power tools, mechanical vehicles, robots, etc. A world's Tech bias governs the success rate and presence of these devices in the world.
- Psionics (a.k.a. 'psi') refers to mental feats and psychic phenomena. Lower level examples are language, decoding, standard cognition, and metacognition. Higher level psi skills include ESP, telepathy, pyrokinetics, telekinesis, etc. A world's Psi bias level affects the level of common psi skills the world's inhabitants practice as well as the chance of success of psi skills.
- Magic (a.k.a. 'mag') covers not just spells, but the supernatural world at large, using the explanation that the ritual of a spell (a spell being anything from a prayer to alchemy) channels expectation of the spell-caster into a desired effect. Mag skills include summoning spirits, incantations to create fireballs, rain dances, ritualistic curses or blessings, etc. A world's Mag bias indicates the level of ritualistic magic practiced by inhabitants as well as the presence of supernatural beings and phenomena.

The higher score of a particular world bias, the easier related tasks are. For example, in a universe with a high magic bias and a low technology bias (compared with modern-day Earth), players could expect to see a world similar to medieval Europe, but with wizards and dragons abound. A moderately high Technology bias, in conjunction with a slightly higher Psionic bias could put the character into a world very similar to the 2002 TV show Firefly.

== Worlds ==
The book of referee's rules provides all the tools a referee needs to create complete Multiverser worlds. Nearly any sort of universe, ranging from almost normal to bizarre beyond imagining, can be modeled with the system, allowing referees great freedom in creating new places to take their players. This means that the worlds can feature original settings with unique stories, or the referees are free to choose to adapt a world from a favorite book or movie for their player to experience.

=== Books of Worlds ===
While they aren't necessary for game-play, there are also two published Multiverser books with completed worlds with all the details required to be used in a campaign. Each book contains a total of 7 worlds. One world in each book is designed as a 'gather world'--a place with vast possibilities, where many players can be brought together and either work together or find their own goals and objectives independently. Also, one world in each book is a 'twin scenario' world which features two different universes whose similarities enable telling two very different settings in one description.

==== First Book of Worlds ====
- NagaWorld, a Gather World - A decidedly alien world; intentionally unearthly in several ways, hosting orange grass and moving stone bushes in a vast alien landscape. There are more secrets than any one player is expected to ever uncover. Multiverser recommends that referees start all players in NagaWorld because it veritably screams, "You're not in Kansas anymore" in ways that cannot be ignored.
- Tristan's Labyrinth - This world is all about the dungeon crawl—the unending inescapable dungeon crawl. The corridors go on forever and the monsters keep coming. There's an explanation for all this, but the player probably will never find it.
- Dancing Princess - This is a fantasy world with a fairy-tale theme. It involves a story of the rescue of three princesses from three demons, and the player character can be the hero who does it. He can even marry the princess of his choice when it's all over.
- Mary Piper, Twin Scenarios - The player character finds himself a stowaway on a merchant ship, and if he doesn't get tossed overboard he becomes a member of the crew, fighting pirates, moving cargo, dealing with adventures on the voyage, and otherwise buckling swashes. However, these events may take place either across the ocean blue between continents or in a spaceship between planets, depending on the referee's choice.
- Sherwood Forest - There is enough history of the age of King Richard to give the fables of Robin Hood a solid grounding in the realities of the day. Whether the player joins the Merry Men or takes his own stand, there are plenty of adventures to be had here.
- The Most Dangerous Game - A hunter who is bored of animals decides to hunt people. The player character becomes the person, and for three days has to elude his brilliant stalker, or find a way to turn the tables on him.
- The Zygote Experience - The player character is reborn—literally. The chapter on this world provides the referee with sufficient medical and social material to start the character at the moment of conception and convey much of the experience of going through gestation and birth, and then gives well-researched developmental materials for following the newborn to adulthood.

==== Second Book of Worlds ====
- Bah Ke'gehn, a Gather World - A masterpiece of misdirection, this world has all the well-known trappings of hell, yet the demonic-looking locals are in some ways more humane than humans, and once they are understood. The potential for player character confusion here is complicated by the fact that to the locals, he looks like their myths of demons; that in this world magic is normal and technology is feared; and that there are a few other humans here who are quite certain (and incorrect) of where they are.
- Prisoner of Zenda - Based on the classic book in which the hero has to be the substitute for the king while striving to rescue the hostage king from his evil half-brother. Combining elements of the book with various translations to the screen, this version provides an adventure in which the player character is the duplicate, and faces the difficult choices presented.
- Farmland, Twin Scenarios- Both scenarios take place in a quiet agrarian society with pre-gunpowder levels of technology which welcome the player character readily. In one scenario, a misstep is likely to have the character tried for witchcraft and burned at the stake to attempt to save his soul. In the other, there is no threat of that, but there is a threat. Instead, alien space ships have been scouting the planet, reported by the locals as apparitions, demons, and signs in the skies, and when they invade only the player character understands what they are and how to stop them.
- New Ice Age - The player character is on Earth as it might be in the survival setting of the frozen wasteland of a modern-day ice age. The chapter expands on various events and human settlements the player character may find, and it also includes information on techniques for living in such a setting.
- Post-Sympathetic Man - This is a world in which "survival of the fittest" is taken as a religious doctrine and human competition for power, wealth, and breeding rights have been driven by modern levels of technology. Even the player who does not throw himself into the competition to survive and prosper may find his character dragged into the fray by those seeking advantage.
- Industrial Complex - As mankind gives all its labor to machines and its land to agriculture, moving into leisurely lives in underground complexes connected by automated subways, it loses all understanding of the world in which it exists. The machines become the gods, and those who can still direct them through the correct ritual sequence of button-pushing are the priests. However, even utopia cannot last forever, and the control systems of the world may be on the verge of collapse. The player character may have to save humanity from its new destruction.
- The Perpetual Barbeque - The player character enters the scene on the morning of a town-wide picnic; but every day seems to be the morning of the picnic, and remains so until he can figure out why and undo the problem. To complicate matters, the day alternates between the most wonderful picnic in memory and an unmitigated disaster in which several people die in tragic accidents.

== Skills ==
Multiverser is designed to allow the player to attempt to take any action in and out of combat. The skills are categorized into the four bias areas tech, mag, psi, and bod, discussed above; just as each world has a bias level in each category, each skill has a certain bias level in its respective category. A mag skill with a high bias level, such as summoning a horde of guardian angels, would have odds stacked against success in a world without a high mag bias. Likewise, a moderate tech skill, such as operating a laser gun, might have a huge success rate in one tech-savvy world but would be near impossible in a low-tech dragons-and-deities world.

When a character attempts to perform a skill, the player rolls one standard percentile dice roll which determines whether the skill failed or succeeded as well as the amplitude of success. For instance, one roll would determine whether an attack connects and how much damage is dealt.

== Reception ==
Multiverser has been described as original and thought-provoking and has received acclaim for its ability to run multiple original campaigns in one game session. Reviewers have been impressed with the thoroughness of the rules and the diversity of the world books, going so far as to say that the books, particularly the books of worlds, could provide valuable information even for other gaming purposes. One reviewer contently cites the Appendix 3: Basic Dicing Curves in the rule book which explains the distribution of probabilities of various common dice rolls.

Critics have expressed disappointment with the complexity of the game mechanics, explaining that the depth and ubiquitous coverage causes the rules to be more cumbersome than many other tabletop RPGs; even reviewers who appreciate Multiverser's thoroughness explain that it comes with an unfortunate level of complexity. Some say that compounded with complexity is unclear, vague, or hard to follow explanations in some places. It has also been said that some rules laid out by the authors are unnecessary and take away from the potential quality of the game; a couple such cited rules is that the player character must be an alternate version of the player himself and that NagaWorld must be the first world a verser visits. The books do strongly suggest these two parameters, but they do state that they aren't definitive requirements—perhaps this misunderstanding stands as a testament to the complaint of ambiguity.
