= Doomtrooper =

Card game

- The card back to Doomtrooper CCG
- Designers: Bryan Winter
- Publishers: Target Games/Heartbreaker Hobbies
- Players: 2 or more
- Setup time: < 3 minutes (Note: Excluding deck construction)
- Playing time: ~ 25 minutes
- Chance: Some
- Skills: Card playing Arithmetic; Reading

Doomtrooper, also known as Doom Trooper, is an out-of-print collectible card game designed by Bryan Winter and was released in 1994 or January 1995. It was originally published by Target Games and Heartbreaker Hobbies. It is based on concepts from the Swedish Mutant Chronicles franchise. Players use warriors to attack and gain either Promotion Points or Destiny Points. Promotion points can be used to win; Destiny Points are used to purchase more warriors and equipment. There are 13 different card types and over 1100 different cards available.

The game was later migrated to a digital version that was successfully funded on Kickstarter.

== Sets ==
- Basic Set (First Edition) in limited, unlimited and revised unlimited editions
- Inquisition (April 1995)
- Warzone (1995)
- Mortificator (1995)
- Golgotha (1996)
- Apocalypse (1996)
- Paradise Lost (1997)
- Ragnarok (never released)

The basic set of the game consisted of 337 cards sold in 60-card starter decks and 16-card booster packs. The starter decks included 2 rare cards and 13 uncommon cards; the booster packs included 1 rare card and 3 uncommon cards.

The 170-card expansion set Inquisition was released in April 1995 and sold in 8-card booster packs. Some of the cards were printed with foil stamping. The expansion set Paradise Lost consisted of over 100 cards sold in 15-card booster packs, and planned Ragnarok was to be similar.

Paradise Lost from 1997 was its last set. Ragnarok, also planned for 1997, was never released, same fate befall the planned 2nd edition of the game; they were later completed as fan expansions.

The game's starter set was released in 16 languages, and its expansion Inquisition in several more. The limited edition of the basic set was released in English, Italian, Spanish, and Swedish. The unlimited edition, published in April 1995, was published in an additional nine languages, including Hebrew and Japanese. The game was released in Poland in 1995, where all but the Mortificator set were localized. Spanish language also saw all expansions released except one (Paradise Lost).

== Gameplay ==
In the game’s dark, futuristic universe, in which rival megacorporations, the mystical Brotherhood, and the alien Dark Legion compete for dominance in the Solar System, players assume the role of members of a secret organization called the Veil, manipulating these factions to gain power and maintain balance.

The game’s core mechanics involves deploying cards, representing soldiers, to accumulate victory points through combat.

== Reception ==
Tom Grant reviewed Doomtrooper for Pyramid magazine reviewed and stated that "In short, Doomtrooper is one of the most successful TCGs, and is an easy way to learn about the excellent line of Mutant Chronicles products (including three terrific board games). What an interesting idea: a trading card game that gets people interested in buying non-card games. Perhaps there's hope for the hobby after all..."

The game was highly popular in Poland, where it was published from 1995 to 2000, and where it was the first CCG released in the native language. In a Polish review for Świat Gier Komputerowych penned by Michał Nowakowski, Doom Trooper is described as a key title in popularizing collectible card games among Polish tabletop players, particularly due to its localized Polish edition, which lowered the language barrier for new players. The reviewer outlines the game’s core mechanics, and notes the importance of faction choice, as most factions face restrictions on whom they can attack, with the Legion of Darkness being the most flexible. The game’s rules are praised for clarity and accessibility, though early faction limitations were seen as problematic until partially mitigated by later expansions. While the reviewer acknowledges the depth added by multiple expansions, criticism is directed at balance issues, especially the introduction of common overpowered cards that diminished the value of base-set cards, even the rare ones. The artwork is regarded as technically strong but visually repetitive due to heavy reliance on a single illustrator’s style. Overall, the reviewer considers Doom Trooper engaging but uneven, arguing that success often depended more on owning powerful cards, card draw luck than strategic skill. Although later expansions introduced greater deck-building variety, the game is ultimately rated as average, with the reviewer personally preferring other collectible card games despite recognizing Doom Trooper’s lasting popularity among dedicated fans.

In a Brazilian review for Coleção Dragão Brasil, the reviewer provided a detailed description of the game’s mechanics, praising the clear structure of turns, actions, and combat, as well as the accessibility of its beginner rules alongside a more complex standard mode. The use of Destiny Points as a resource system is compared to mana in Magic: The Gathering, and faction-based attack restrictions are highlighted as a defining feature of gameplay. The artwork is described as dark and visually appealing, if perhaps on the small side. The reviewer however criticizes the game’s balance, arguing that victory depends too heavily on owning powerful and rare warrior cards rather than player skill, which effectively gives advantage to wealthier players. Overall, the game is characterized as fast-paced and enjoyable, but undermined by pay-to-win dynamics.

In a review in Shadis co-written by two reviewers, the reviewers highlight the game’s accessible rules, clear rulebook, and distinctive Destiny Points system, which allows players to manage resources and actions strategically. The inclusion of both a simplified beginner mode and an expanded standard game is praised, as is the faction-based structure, unique character personalities, and strong thematic integration with the broader Mutant Chronicles setting.The game’s artwork and visual design receive mixed responses. While the overall presentation, borders, and thematic imagery are considered attractive, much of the artwork is reused from the role-playing game and sometimes poorly cropped. Card layout is regarded as clean but lacking visual emphasis on key rules text. The need to invest in multiple booster packs which effectively means one can increase the likelihood of victory by spending more money, reliance on numerous counters, thin bendable cardstock, long playtimes, and the difficulty of earning promotion points are also cited as drawbacks. Despite these issues, the reviewers generally regard Doom Trooper as an engaging and flavorful game that effectively promotes interest in the Mutant Chronicles world, though one limited by accessibility, balance concerns, and a small player base at the time of release.
