= Mutant Chronicles (film) =

- Theatrical release poster
- Directed by: Simon Hunter
- Written by: Philip Eisner; Stuart Hazeldine (uncredited)
- Produced by: Edward R. Pressman; Tim Dennison; Pras Michel; Stephen Belafonte; Peter La Terriere
- Starring: Thomas Jane; Ron Perlman; John Malkovich
- Cinematography: Geoff Boyle
- Edited by: Sean Barton; Alison Lewis
- Music by: Richard Wells
- Production companies: Isle of Man Film; Grosvenor Park
- Distributed by: Entertainment Film Distributors (United Kingdom); Magnet Releasing (United States)
- Release dates: October 10, 2008 (United Kingdom); April 24, 2009 (United States)
- Running time: 111 minutes (International); 101 minutes (United States)
- Countries: United Kingdom; United States
- Language: English
- Budget: $25 million
- Box office: $2.1 million

Mutant Chronicles is a 2008 British-American science fiction steampunk action-horror film, loosely based on the role-playing game of the same name. The film was directed by Simon Hunter, and stars Thomas Jane and Ron Perlman.

It was released throughout Europe in 2008, followed by a North American VOD on March 27, 2009, and a theatrical release for selected cities on April 24, 2009. The film was released on DVD and Blu-ray on August 4, 2009.

== Plot ==
The story is set in the year 2707. The world is loosely based on that of the Mutant Chronicles role-playing game, in which many technologies are steam powered and mankind has exhausted Earth's natural resources. The protagonists must battle against mutated humans that were accidentally unleashed.

The plot revolves around a "machine" which came from space 10,000 years ago. The "machine" mutates people into barely intelligent killing drones, known as "mutants", that drag new victims to the machine for conversion. Sealed away thousands of years ago by human tribes, the machine is accidentally uncovered during a large battle in Eastern Europe between two (Capitol and Bauhaus) of the four corporations that now rule the world (the other two being Mishima and Imperial). Within six weeks the world is almost completely overrun by the mutant gangs. Some of the population has been evacuated to Mars, but millions remain on the doomed Earth. A group of soldiers are assembled to take another ancient device to the heart of the machine in an attempt to destroy it in a suicide mission. In return, their loved ones receive coveted tickets to Mars.

En route their spaceship is shot down by a kamikaze airship piloted by a mutant. The group is forced to battle through the mutants in tunnels to reach the machine, hoping to save the last of humanity. In their attempt to reach the machine, most die, with Mitch being partially transformed into a mutant and Brother Samuel being fully transformed. Mitch is able to halt his own transformation, but is forced to kill Brother Samuel. Mitch, being the last survivor, is ultimately successful in activating the ancient device, causing the machine (which was actually part of a spacecraft) not to be destroyed but to blast off into space.

A dying and mutated Samuel tells him to "have faith" as Mitch jumps from the slowly ascending rocket, landing in an underground lake beneath the rocket. Crawling onto land he sees the rocket disappear into the sky, realizing he is the prophesied savior of mankind, despite not believing in a god. Grievously wounded and partially mutated, he unsuccessfully attempts to light a final crooked cigarette. The final plan shows the rocket (ironically) en route to the red planet.

== Cast ==
- Thomas Jane as Sergeant John Mitchell "Mitch" Hunter
- Ron Perlman as Brother Samuel
- Devon Aoki as Corporal Valerie Chinois Duval
- Benno Fürmann as Lieutenant Maximillian Emile Von Steiner
- Sean Pertwee as Nathan Rooker
- John Malkovich as Constantine
- Anna Walton as Severian
- Luis Echegaray as Corporal Jesus "El Jesus" de Barrera
- Shauna Macdonald as Adelaide
- Tom Wu as Corporal Juba Kim Wu
- Steve Toussaint as Captain John Patrick McGuire
- Roger Ashton-Griffiths as Science Monk
- Curtis Walker as "Bigboy"

== Production ==
=== Development ===
In December 1995, it was reported that producer Edward R. Pressman had acquired the rights to adapt the pen-and-paper role-playing game Mutant Chronicles. A $40 million incarnation of the project was planned to be filmed in London, England in early 1996 with John Carpenter set to direct, but stalled in development due to Pressman suffering back-to-back under-performances of Judge Dredd, The Crow: City of Angels, and The Island of Dr. Moreau. Pressman then later set up an incarnation of the project at 20th Century Fox with Stephen Norrington slated to direct, but after facing several delays related to concerns of the budget Norrington left to direct Blade. An incarnation to be helmed by Roger Christian also failed to come together with Christian instead making Battlefield Earth. In October 1997, Pressman said the film was to have a marketing plan that would involve a merchandising program for a major toy line, publishing, videogames and an animated TV series. In November 1998, Helkon Media had signed a deal with Pressman to co-produce Mutant Chonicles with a $35 million budget to be directed by Robert Sigl, however this incarnation of the project never came to fruition due to Helkon's bankruptcy and collapse. In November 2005, it was announced Mutant Chronicles was finally beginning production following a decade of development hell with Simon Hunter directed from a script he co-wrote with Ross Jameson.

== Critical reception ==
On Rotten Tomatoes, the film holds an approval rating of 17% based on 35 reviews, with a weighted average rating of 3.5/10. The site's critical consensus reads "Bad acting, poor CGI and clunky script mean this sci-fi thriller is lacking in all departments including the thrills."
