= Mutant Chronicles =

Tabletop role-playing game

- Mutant Chronicles 2nd Edition cover
- Designers: Nils Gullikson, Michael Stenmark, Henrik Strandberg, Magnus Seter, Jerker Sojdelius, Stefan Thulin, Fredrik Malmberg
- Publishers: Target Games
- Publication: February 1993
- Genres: Techno-fantasy, thriller
- Systems: Custom

Mutant Chronicles is a pen-and-paper role-playing game set in a post-apocalyptic world, originally published in 1993. It has spawned a franchise of collectible card games, miniature wargames, video games, novels, comic books, and a film of the same title based on the game world.

Mutant Chronicles was developed by the Swedish company Target Games as an independent spinoff to their Mutant RPG series, specifically Mutant RYMD released the year before. Unlike previous Swedish role-playing games, Mutant Chronicles was released in English, and focused on reaching an international audience.

The rights to the game are now owned by Paradox Entertainment.

In 2015, Cabinet Holdings acquired Paradox Entertainment Inc. and all subsidiaries and their properties, including Mutant Chronicles.

== Story ==
The game takes place in a distant future where the Earth has long since been depleted of natural resources and abandoned. Humanity has spread to the worlds of Venus, Mars, Mercury, Luna (the Moon, the first settlement following the exodus from Earth), and the Asteroid belt.

Since the exodus from Earth the traditional nation-states of the world have merged into five huge megacorporations: Bauhaus, styled after the culture of continental Europe, the American-influenced Capitol, the Japanese-themed Mishima, the British-inspired Imperial, and the ultra-secretive, ambiguous, high-tech wielding Cybertronic, all of whom use private military forces to fight for resources. Luna itself is considered to be neutral ground and is home to the massive city-state known as Luna City.

The other major power of this universe is the Brotherhood, a fanatical religious organization formed to meet the threat of the Dark Legion, an ancient evil comprising five "Dark Apostles" and their horde of hideous mutants and undead. The Dark Legion is the corporeal presentation of the Dark Symmetry and its members are minions of the Dark Apostles. The Dark Legion commands the most powerful armies of the Solar System, including Legionnaires, resurrected corpses of fallen Megacorp heroes and footsoldiers alike; Necromutants, hideously modified humanoids; Centurions, the lethal lieutenants of the Dark Legion; and Nepharites, fearsome, towering behemoths of unimaginable power.

The reign of the Dark Legion began as mankind set foot on Nero, a fictional tenth planet beyond the orbit of Pluto, where they discovered a citadel. As they entered, the Imperial Conquistadors – a group of interplanetary explorers – accidentally broke the First Seal of Repulsion, a thin ring of salt spread around the citadel. Inside, a mysterious iron plate was found, and as it was touched, the Dark Legion was brought to our dimension, and along with it, the Dark Symmetry.

The Dark Symmetry prevents computers, "thinking engines", and other electronic devices from functioning reliably, if at all; this initially caused complete chaos, and then a forced adaptation of the technology used by mankind. The Dark Symmetry also begins to spread plagues, lies, illusions and war on the human population through the five Dark Apostles: Demnogonis, Semai, Muawihje, Algeroth and Ilian, the Dark Mistress, the most powerful wielder of the Dark Symmetry. Thus the First Corporate Wars began. Only through the Brotherhood and its first Cardinal, Nathaniel Durand, were the corporations pulled under one banner, driving the Dark Legion and the Dark Symmetry back to the void where they came from.

This however cost Nathaniel Durand his life as he fought and defeated Algeroth, the field commander of the Dark Legion and master of Dark Technology. A millennium later, the Dark Legion resurfaced, old edicts to keep the evil at bay were broken, and Megacorps began the Second Corporate Wars. Yet again, Nero was explored and Dark Symmetry was unleashed. It was also during the period of a thousand years peace that Cybertronic surfaced, and was the first corporation to break one of the edicts: humans must not create or use machines that think like Man.

== Editions ==
Target Games published the two first editions of the game (in 1993 and 1997 respectively).

Mutant Chronicles was one of the first role-playing games translated into English, along with Kult (1993), and Nephilim (1994).

Between 2006 and 2009, a Swedish game company, COG Games, held the license rights to publish a new edition of the role-playing game. In September 2009, COG's failure to deliver any results resulted in their license being revoked.

In 2013, British game company Modiphius announced that it would be releasing the official 3rd edition of the role-playing game. The core rulebook was released digitally in September 2015, preceding the hardback release in December 2015.

== Spin-offs ==
- Doomtrooper, a collectible card game where the players commands warriors, magic and resources against their opponents.
- Dark Eden, a second collectible card game designed by Bryan Winter based on the tribes remaining on planet Earth. Genesis, an expansion set, was never released.
- Warzone, a miniature wargame much like Warhammer 40,000. A Warzone real-time strategy video game was in the process of being made but never published.
- The Doom Troopers video game was released for the Super NES and Genesis systems.
- A trilogy of novels set in this universe were published by Penguin Books to boost the franchise and widen the perspective of the role-players.
- The Siege of the Citadel board game, where players fight their way through a citadel filled with monsters from the Dark Legion. It was first released in 1993. In 2019 a new version was released by Modiphius.
- Fury of the Clansmen and Blood Berets are two-player board games where players (or teams of players) could recreate battles between Imperial troops and the Dark Legion.
- Acclaim Comics published a set of five Golgotha comics in 1996. Issue #5 was a source book with minimal info about some of the characters from the comics. Each of the comics came packaged with one of four promotional cards for the Doomtrooper CCG. Written by William King with art by Davide Fabbri and others, #1-5.
- Fantasy Flight Games published a collectible miniatures game set in the Mutant Chronicles universe and was released in August 2008.
- Mutant Chronicles, an independent film directed by Simon Hunter, that reimagines the setting of the RPG.

== Reception ==
Denys Backriges reviewed Mutant Chronicles in White Wolf #41 (March, 1994), rating it a 4 out of 5 and stated that "The book is beautiful, and the game offers a lot. Everything you need to start a campaign is here. An initial scenario would have been helpful, but the authors do suggest a few adventure ideas. If you're interested in science fiction or fantasy of the Warhammer 40K variety, give Mutant Chronicles a look - you won't regret it."

Craig Sheeley reviewed Mutant Chronicles for Pyramid #6 (March/April, 1994) and stated "The Mutant Chronicles looks like it can and will accomplish what Warhammer 40,000 failed to do, which is to provide an interlinked game background between several games, including bringing a roleplaying game into the mix."

== Reviews ==
- Review in Shadis #16
- Casus Belli #78
- Casus Belli #83

== See also ==
- The Brotherhood (Mutant Chronicles)
- Freelancer's Handbook and Game Master's Screen
- Capitol: Pride and Profit
- The Second Seal of Repulsion
- The Four Riders
- Beyond the Pale (Mutant Chronicles)
