= Metropolis Ltd =

Tabletop role-playing game publisher

Metropolis Ltd was an American game company that produced role-playing games and game supplements.

== History ==
After leaving Iron Crown Enterprises full-time in 1992, Terry K. Amthor co-founded Metropolis Ltd. in order to produce the English-language version of the controversial Swedish modern-horror game Kult. In 1992–1994, Amthor edited, co-authored and art-directed several books for the line.

Target Games/Äventyrsspel offered Iron Crown Enterprises the opportunity to translate their role-playing game Kult into English, but instead ICE founder Terry Amthor took on the translation of Kult as a freelance project with funding and distribution from Heartbreaker Hobbies and Games. The new company Metropolis Ltd. was dedicated to the production of Kult in the United States with Amthor as president, and was the first company formed in America specifically to publish an English version of a foreign-language role-playing game. Metropolis produced an English version of Kult (1993), based on Target's second edition of the game (1993).

Kult (1993) by Metropolis was part of the first wave of foreign-language role-playing games that were translated into English, along with Mutant Chronicles (1993) by Target Games and Nephilim (1994). Metropolis continued to published Kult products from 1993–1996, and averaged two or three books each year, and reprinted books from Target through 1995. Target ended their own Swedish-language production of the game in 1994, and Metropolis published nearly all of the remaining Target books by the end of 1995, after which Target began producing new Kult material in English, while Metropolis slowly faded away over the course of 1996.
