= Drakar och Demoner =

Fantasy role-playing game

- 1991 4th edition cover art by Michael Whelan, from the DAW Books edition of the Michael Moorcock novel Stormbringer
- Designers: Tomas Björklund (1st); Lars-Åke Thor (1st–5th); Anders Blixt (2nd–5th); Åke Eldberg (2nd–5th); Henrik Strandberg (2nd–5th); Marcus Thorell (2nd–5th); Dan Slottner (6th); Magnus Malmberg (6th); Theodore Bergquist (6th)
- Publishers: Fria Ligan; RiotMinds; Target Games; Neogames
- Publication: 1982–present
- Genres: Fantasy
- Systems: Custom (based on Basic Role-Playing)

Drakar och Demoner (ˈdrɑːkar ɔkː dəˈmoːnər) (Swedish for Dragons and Demons, in Sweden commonly referred to by the abbreviation "DoD") is a Swedish fantasy role-playing game first published in 1982 by the game publishing company Äventyrsspel ("Adventure Games", later renamed Target Games).

The latest three editions of the game were translated into English under the names of Trudvang Chronicles, Ruin Masters and Dragonbane.

== Development history ==
Drakar och Demoner has its origins in the Swedish recreational wargaming scene. Target Games, the company that went on to publish Drakar och Demoner, was founded in 1980 to import and sell wargames. One of the founders of Target Games, Fredrik Malmberg, moved to the United States in order to import wargames to Sweden, while also working for various game publishers. There he came in contact with the burgeoning role-playing game scene in the United States.

Seeing that role-playing games were much more popular in the US than wargames, Malmberg got the idea that Target Games should publish a Swedish language role-playing game; English language role-playing games like Dungeons & Dragons had made some inroads in Sweden at the time, but the language barrier prevented them from reaching a larger audience. Malmberg (who rented a room from Steve Perrin during his stay in California) was one of the game testers of the Call of Cthulhu and Stormbringer role-playing games and had access to the unpublished manuscript of the upcoming Worlds of Wonder multi-genre set of three role-playing games.

Malmberg states that he was influenced by working with Chaosium's rules sets, and considered Dungeons & Dragons rules to be inferior and obsolete. Target Games bought a license to publish Chaosium's Basic Role-Playing combined with the fantasy-themed Magic World booklet from Worlds of Wonder to create a new Swedish language role-playing game: Drakar och Demoner. Since Target Games was a reseller of games and not a publisher, Target Games' board decided to found a separate arm of the company that would publish games, and they named it Äventyrspel.

The second edition was published in 1984, rewriting the text from scratch, fixing many translation errors, glitches in the rules, with no other major changes made. One of the available player races, the anthropomorphic ducks, was incorporated from Glorantha.

A rules transition began in 1985, not with the third edition which mostly corrected spelling errors, but with the publication of an "Expert" rule expansion: Drakar och Demoner Expert. Among other things it introduced hit locations, and the use of a 20-sided die instead of the percentile die for skill rolls.

The fourth edition in 1991 was a major revision of the rules, superseding Drakar och Demoner Expert by incorporating it into the basic rules and then expanding them.

In 1994, Target Games released a fifth edition, called Drakar och Demoner Chronopia. This edition came with an integrated campaign setting. Changes to the rules were minor, mostly reflecting the new setting.

In the late 1990s, Target Games found itself in financial difficulties and discontinued their line of role-playing games. The rights to Drakar och Demoner were transferred to Paradox Entertainment, who in turn licensed them to RiotMinds. RiotMinds published a new version of the game in 2000. This sixth edition was a complete overhaul of the game rules, supporting a much less generic game world. The idea of "Expert" rules was reused, and many rules expansions followed.

When RiotMinds released their Drakar och Demoner ruleset, it featured a concept very close to levels ("yrkesnivåer"). It didn't take long before an official addendum appeared on their website, with optional rules on how to play without this feature. In the subsequent reprints (as well as later editions) little or no traces of "yrkesnivåer" remain.

In 2006, RiotMinds published the seventh edition, which has many rule changes to better support its campaign world. Among those were the removal of the basic character stats (grundegenskaper) which were replaced with 'exceptional abilities' (exceptionella karaktärsdrag), and the introduction of specializations of skills. This boxed edition is called Drakar och Demoner Trudvang.

In 2015 RiotMinds announced a re-release of the 1987 edition of the game featuring new art and minor fixes, but otherwise identical. A line of products including several new campaigns was planned after its August 2016 release. On May 16, 2016, RiotMinds announced that Drakar och Demoner Trudvang would be released in an English version, under the name Trudvang Chronicles.

In 2019, RiotMinds successfully crowdfunded Ruin Masters, an updated and re-designed English version of the classic game, including new art and design. It has cover art by Adrian Smith, and interior art from artists including, Jesper Ejsing, Johan Egerkrans and Alvaro Tapia. The Ruin Masters Bestiary was successfully funded on Kickstarter in 2021.

In August 2021, RiotMinds announced that it had sold the IP for Drakar och Demoner to Fria Ligan (Free League Publishing). RiotMinds stated they would continue to support their Ruin Masters game and its Caldarox setting with no connection to Drakar och Demoner (eventually the rights for Ruin Masters and Trudvang Chronicles games were acquired by CMON in 2022). Consequently, Free League successfully crowdfunded a new edition of the game in August 2022, called Dragonbane in English. The new edition has English, Brazilian Portuguese, Swedish, German, Danish, Polish, and Norwegian language versions. In early 2026, Free League announced that they will be publishing Dragonbane: Trudvang (known as Drakar och Demoner: Trudvang in Swedish), a stand-alone game set in Trudvang, which will fully be compatible with their 2023 edition of Dragonbane.

== Campaign settings ==
Like many other early role-playing games, Drakar och Demoner began without a fully developed campaign setting.

The first campaign setting of Drakar och Demoner was called Ereb Altor (Ereb being the name of the continent where most – if not all – official adventures take place, Altor being the name of the planet on which Ereb is located). It was created bit by bit by different writers through adventures and source books creating a somewhat haphazard world; medieval feudal states exist side-by-side with comparably advanced Renaissance-styled nations.

With the fifth version Target Games decided to introduce a new, darker campaign setting named Chronopia, thereby ceasing publication of new material for Ereb. After an outcry among fans of Ereb ensued, Target Games decided that Ereb and Chronopia both existed on Altor but on different hemispheres. At this time, a tabletop miniatures game line was also started; see Chronopia below. In 2015, Cabinet Holdings acquired Paradox Entertainment Inc. and all subsidiaries and their properties, including Chronopia.

RiotMinds created a brand-new campaign setting called Trudvang, which utilized cultures, creatures and monsters based on Scandinavian folklore instead of the standard fantasy creatures.

== Other media ==
=== Miniature games ===
First Edition: Chronopia: Dark Fantasy Battles (1997) was a tabletop miniature game published by Target Games. Players would field an army composed of 25 mm miniatures which were composed of pewter, resin, or a composite of both. The game featured eight different armies for players to choose from.

Second Edition: Chronopia: War in the Eternal Realm (2002) was a tabletop miniature game published by Excelsior Entertainment.

In 2015, Cabinet Holdings acquired Paradox Entertainment Inc. and all subsidiaries and their properties, including Chronopia.

In 2022, German company Uhrwerk Verlag ran a successful crowdfunding-campaign to re-release thetabletop miniature game.

=== Computer game ===
In 1999, a Drakar och Demoner video game was released by the name of Drakar och Demoner: Själarnas Brunn (released as Dragonfire: The Well of Souls internationally). It was made by then-defunct Swedish developer ComputerHouse GBG AB. The game takes place in the original campaign setting of Ereb Altor six years after the events in the popular adventure trilogy Den Nidländska Reningen.

=== Short film ===
In 2013, a 28 minute short film Drakar och Demoner – Tronländaren was released.
