= Target Games =

Tabletop role-playing game publisher

Target Games AB
- Company type: Publicly traded Aktiebolag
- Industry: Role-playing games, collectible card games, miniature wargaming, and other assorted media
- Founded: 1980
- Founder: Fredrik Malmberg, Lars-Åke Thor, Johan Arve, Klas Berndal, Roger Undhagen
- Defunct: 1999
- Fate: Bankruptcy
- Headquarters: Stockholm, Sweden
- Key people: Anders Blixt, Bryan Winter
- Products: Drakar och Demoner, Mutant, Mutant Chronicles, Kult, Doom Troopers, Warzone
- Divisions: Target Games Interactive AB; Target Games Adventure AB; Target Games UK; Target Games Eire

Target Games was a Swedish publisher of role-playing games active from 1980 until the year 1999 when they went into bankruptcy proceedings. Until the mid-1990s they published their Swedish roleplaying games under the brand name Äventyrsspel (meaning "adventure games").

== Publications ==
They published much of their early material in the form of stapled books in G5 (169 × 239 mm) format in a box together with dice.

Äventyrsspel released the role-playing games Drakar och Demoner (1982), Mutant (1984) (with the later versions Mutant (1989), Mutant RYMD (1992) and Mutant Chronicles, Kult (1991), Chock (1985, a translation of Chill), Sagan om Ringen (1986, a translation of Middle-earth Role Playing) and Stjärnornas Krig (1988, a translation of the WEG Star Wars role-playing game). Target Games also published the miniature wargames Warzone and Chronopia, and several collectible card games including Doomtrooper.

They also released three generic sourcebooks, Grymkäfts fällor (1987) (translated from the classic game supplement Grimtooth's Traps), Stadsintermezzon (1988) and Skattkammaren (1988) as well as many adventures and sourcebooks for their games. Target Games was reconstructed in 1999 and ceased publication of all of its inventory and the intellectual property rights were transferred to the daughter company Paradox Entertainment, which later became an independent company. Some of the titles have since been licensed to new game companies.

Beside role-playing games, the company had its own store chain named Tradition, a trade magazine named Sinkadus, published translated gamebooks (the Lone Wolf series among others) as well as publishing family board games (under the Casper trademark) and translated fantasy novels (beginning with a Conan the Barbarian book). Target Games also published at least three computer games (including one Drakar och Demoner game) before reconstruction.

== Original products ==
=== Drakar och Demoner ===
The fantasy role-playing Drakar och Demoner (first edition published in 1982) was Äventyrsspel's best-selling series of games. The first editions were basically a translation into Swedish of Steve Perrin's Basic Role-Playing (BRP). The various Äventyrsspel editions of the game all remained fundamentally BRP system games.The earlier editions did not include any campaign setting except for some information about generic fantasy creatures and so on. Over time, different writers created the "Ereb Altor" campaign setting piecemeal in adventures and source books. For the fifth edition, released in 1994, a new setting was created, dubbed "Chronopia", that had a darker tone.

Today the Drakar och Demoner brand is owned by Swedish company Free League Publishing.

=== Mutant ===
1989 version box cover

The name Mutant was used for a series of related science fiction themed role-playing games. The 1984 version was set in a post-apocalyptic world similar to the one in Gamma World. Mutant 2 (1986) was an expansion module with more advanced rules. The 1989 version was a cyberpunk game while the later Mutant RYMD (1992) and Mutant Chronicles (first edition 1993) were science fantasy games set in the Solar System. These versions used variants of the same Basic Role-Playing rule system used in Drakar och Demoner.

Later Mutant games include Undergångens arvtagare (Heirs to the Apocalypse) by Järnringen, and År Noll by Fria Ligan (who publishes the English-language version of that game, Mutant – Year Zero, as Free League).

=== Mutant Chronicles ===
An offshoot of Mutant, as an RPG set in a dystopic future solar system, Mutant Chronicles evolved into a brand of its own. The Mutant Chronicles brand later became so popular that it spawned multiple spin-offs as well, most notably the Doomtrooper collectible card game as well as the Warzone miniature wargame.

=== Kult ===
Kult is a contemporary horror-themed game that Äventyrsspel first released in 1991. The setting was inspired by Gnostic philosophy and horror films such as Hellraiser. The violent horror themes of the game made it a subject of controversy in Sweden on multiple occasions. This resulted in Swedish toy stores refusing to sell the game.

There were three editions based on the original ruleset published in Swedish, English and more by several companies.

2018 saw a brand-new edition Divinity Lost by Helmgast, using a version of the Apocalypse World engine.
