= Character Law =

Fantasy role-playing game supplement

Character Law is a supplement published by Iron Crown Enterprises (ICE) in 1982 for the fantasy role-playing game Rolemaster.

== Publication history ==
Character Law, a 48-page softcover book written by S. Coleman Charlton and Peter C. Fenlon and published by Iron Crown Enterprises in 1982, is the original version of the Rolemaster rules for character generation and development.

In the 2014 book Designers & Dragons: The '80s, author Shannon Applecline related that after publishing several other rulebooks, "Finally, ICE produced Character Law (1982), a book that provided character creation rules. It tied the set of four books into a (somewhat) cohesive whole, as was shown when Spell Law, Arms Law, Claw Law, and Character Law were reprinted as a boxed set called Rolemaster (1982).

A second edition was published in 1984.

== Contents ==
=== Character generation ===
In the first and second editions of this book, there are nineteen different character classes available that can be further customized according to spells and race chosen.

The player starts by rolling percentile die ten times, then assigns these scores to the ten character abilities. The player then picks a race, applying racial bonuses to the appropriate scores, and chooses a character class. If the two primary abilities for the character class chosen are not already more than 90, the player raises them to 90. Every character in Rolemaster starts at 3rd level, so the player must decide how to design the first two levels to simulate the character's experiences thus far.

=== Character advancement ===
Character gain experience points for killing opponents, inflicting and receiving damage during combat, casting spells, executing unusual or difficult tasks, having a religious experience, travel, and dying. In addition, the character can also be granted "idea points" if the character's idea or plan was successfully executed by the entire party.

Unlike other role-playing systems where a character's skills are all raised when a level is gained, in the Rolemaster system, only a limited number of skills can be increased at each level; the player decides which skills will improve.

== Reception ==
Ronald Pehr reviewed Character Law for Fantasy Gamer magazine and stated that "Although glossing over such things as descriptions of the character classes and development of the background world, Character Law does make an attempt to draw the systems provided in all the booklets into a coherent game."

In the August 1984 edition of Dragon (Issue #88), although Arlen Walker liked the ability to move randomly generated ability scores around to produce the most beneficial results for the character class sought, he disagreed with the system of raising two character class abilities up to 90 if they were not already 90 or better. Walker felt this created a monochrome cast of characters and non-player characters. Walker liked the different ways that characters could gain experience points, such as travel, having religious experiences such as visions, and for coming up with a brilliant idea — although he thought this one would probably lead to arguments over which player had originally voiced the germ of the idea. But he didn't like the idea that characters get experience points for dying, which he found "difficult to swallow." He pointed out that this could lead to some unsavoury gamesmanship: "If your character dies and is brought back to life, he gets experience points equal to his own kill value. Yet, if the character is miraculously snatched back from the brink by an herb or healing spell, he gets only half the number of points. This could conceivably lead to a campaign in which characters would literally be dying to gain levels."
