= Magic systems in games =

Rules, limitations, abilities, and characteristics that define magic in a game

Magic systems in games are the rules, limitations, abilities, and characteristics that define magic in a game.

== Magic points ==
A magic point, sometimes known as a mana point, often abbreviated to MP, is a unit of measure that indicates either or both the amount of magic that can be utilized by a user, and the amount of energy that they can harness to perform magic. A magic point system is the most common method used to regulate and thus limit the number of spells that a magical individual can cast. Such a system gives magic users a specific amount of MP, and each spell causes a specific number of magic points to be consumed upon being cast. Many systems that use magic points assign a magic user a maximum number of MP that they can have at any one time, which is different for each magic user. There is typically a way to restore lost MP, usually by resting or imbibing potions. Sometimes consuming certain foods may replenish MP.

A few systems that use MP do not have a maximum number that may be stored, but instead make it more difficult to recover or gain new magic points.

Examples of MP-limited systems include Rolemaster, High Adventure Role Playing, GURPS, and Tunnels & Trolls.

== Skill-limited ==
A skill-limited magic system breaks the spells down into a number of skills. To perform skills usually requires skill checks: a dice roll, modified by character statistics. The more difficult the magical effect, the higher the difficulty of the die roll. Such systems are often limited by an increase in the difficulty of the skill roll based upon the number of spells in a certain time period that have already been cast.

It is common in skill-limited systems for a spellcaster to be able to combine multiple magical skills to perform effects not covered by the skills given. Typically, such combinations are more difficult than the basic uses of the skills.

Examples of skill-limited systems include Talislanta and Ars Magica.

== Spell slots ==
A magic system that is limited by a number of spell slots will give a spellcaster a certain number of spells per day that may be cast. These spells may be divided by level or limited to certain types of spells. When all of a spellcaster's slots are used up, the caster is no longer able to perform magic until steps are taken (usually sleeping and re-studying the spells) to recover the spell slots. This mechanic originated out of the Vancian magic system, where "the number of memorized spells is strictly limited by the magician's memory capacity in proportion to the spells' difficulty levels, effectively granting a number of spell slots".

Spell-slot systems often employ a rationale that the spell is forgotten when cast, or that the caster has a finite supply of the ingredients required to cast the spell. In the first case, the spellcaster must re-memorize the spell from a source, typically a grimoire. In the second case, the caster must find new ingredients and prepare the equipment needed to cast the spell.

For example, Dungeons & Dragons simplified Jack Vance's formula "to a number of spell slots scaling with the player character's level". HackMaster also uses a spell-slot system.

== Hybrid systems ==
Many magic systems combine features of two or all three of the above. As an example, Mage: The Ascension uses a skill-limited system that may be augmented by spending Quintessence to lower the difficulty of a magical skill roll. Rolemaster employs a spell-point system, but includes devices called spell adders that grant additional spell shots with no associated spell-point cost. Ars Magica uses a skill-based system, but a mage can only cast so many spells before becoming too fatigued to continue. High Adventure Role Playing also uses a hybrid system between the magic point system and the skill system, and to some extent the spell slot version, which requires a skill roll based on the strength of the spell effect, limiting the total number of spells cast in a day by a magic cost system, with the caster having a certain set of magic points available each day. As in Rolemaster, there are items that can reduce the magic point cost for spells as well as items like spell adders that allow extra spells to be cast without the expenditure of magic points.

== List of specific examples ==
- The Magic in Dungeons & Dragons consists of spells and magic systems used in the settings of the role-playing game Dungeons & Dragons (D&D). The novel series Dying Earth by Jack Vance provided the model for the magic system of Dungeons & Dragons, as magic-users memorize spells and then forget them after casting them.
- Tunnels & Trolls used a magic system that used humorous names such as "Take That You Fiend!" and "Too Bad Toxin".
- Warhammer Fantasy Roleplay had a simplistic magic system and Games Workshop had promised a "Realms of Sorcery" supplement to correct this problem, but after rejecting the manuscript Ken Rolston submitted they never published the book. Hogshead Publishing ultimately finally published the Realms of Sorcery (2001) supplement, which updated the original magic system from the Warhammer rulebook.
- The magic system of Nephilim was thematic but necessitated complex calculations.
- Middle-earth Role Playing used a magic system based on Spell Law from Rolemaster.
- Palladium Fantasy Role-Playing Game featured a revised version of the magic system from The Journey (1982).
- Beyond the Supernatural featured the debut from Palladium of their Potential Psychic Energy (PPE) magic system in addition to a system of geomancy based on ley-lines.
- The second edition of HârnMaster was a simplified version of the game that separated its magic systems into Hârnmaster Magic (1997) and Hârnmaster Religion (1998).
- The original magic system of Changeling: The Dreaming used Cantrip Cards, which were sold separately in collectible packs.
- For the magic system of Ars Magica, all magic comes from five techniques and ten forms, and wizards can create any type of spell by combining any two of those elements.
- The supplement A Magical Medley (1997) included a collection of magic systems for FUDGE.
- The magic system of the Demon City Shinjuku Role-Playing Game (2000) advanced the game mechanics of Big Eyes, Small Mouth.
- The magic system of Sovereign Stone expanded the dice-rolling system of the game; it can take some time to cast so every turn a magician accumulates points and much reach a certain total for the spell to be cast successfully.
- The Encyclopaedia Arcane uses a series of alternative magic systems that began publication with Demonology: The Dark Road (2001), the first perfect-bound 64-page book from Mongoose Publishing.
- The Mongoose Publishing edition of RuneQuest (2006) included a new magic system using runes in which the characters needed to go on quests for physical runes.
- The supplement Street Magic (2006) expanded the fourth edition Shadowrun magic system.
