= Spell Law =

Role-playing game supplement

Spell Law is a role-playing game supplement first published by Iron Crown Enterprises (ICE) in 1981 and written by Peter C. Fenlon, Jr., S. Coleman Charlton, and Terry K. Amthor, with Steven E. Moffat. It was originally published as a separate boxed set of four books, but was included in the initial 1984 release of the fantasy role-playing game Rolemaster, and a separate third edition Spell Law book for Rolemaster was published in 1986 and a fourth edition book in 1989. Spell Law contains over 2,000 spells for role-playing game characters. It received mixed reviews in game periodicals including Ares, Different Worlds, The Space Gamer, and Dragon.

== Publication history ==
Spell Law was written by Peter C. Fenlon, Jr., S. Coleman Charlton, and Terry K. Amthor, with Steven E. Moffat, and was published by Iron Crown Enterprises in 1981 as a boxed set with four 24-page books and 8 sheets of tables. A second edition was published in 1984, and a third edition was published in 1986 as a 96-page book with a cover by Gail B. McIntosh, and a fourth edition was published in 1989 as a 160-page book with a cover by Angus McBride.

Originally published in 1982 as a generic set of rules for using magic spells in any role-playing system, Spell Law was linked to the Rolemaster game system with its inclusion in the boxed set of Rolemaster in 1982. A second edition was published in 1984, again for inclusion in a boxed set of Rolemaster.

== Contents ==
Over 2,000 spells are listed in the book, divided into three Realms — Essence, Channeling and Mentalism. The character class chosen by the player will dictate from which school the character can learn spells. The number of spells that can be learned and their complexity are dictated by the character's level.

=== Learning spells ===
During the character generation process outlined in the companion volume Character Law, a player can purchase "picks" for spell levels from "A" to "E", which can then be used to learn spells up to a certain level — an "A" pick allows only spells up to level 5 to be learned, while an "E" pick allows spells of up to level 25. At each new level of experience, the character gains one new "pick", which can be added to previous picks to increase the level of spells that can be learned. (Character classes who are not "pure" spellcasters, such as paladins and rangers, can never learn spells above 5th level.)

Regardless of what level of spell can be learned, a character cannot cast a spell that is a higher level than the character's class; that is, a 3rd-level character who can learn spells of up to 5th level still can't cast spells higher than 3rd level.

=== Casting ===
The casting time is determined by the difference in spell level and character level — a spell equal to the character level will take longer to cast than a spell several levels below the character class. The caster then rolls dice to make a targeting roll, modified for distance and mage level among other factors. The targeted creature then makes a resistance roll, modified by the power of the spell, the level of the targeted creature, and the total of the caster's targeting roll.

== Reception ==
In the November 1981 edition of Ares (Issue #11), Eric Goldberg was not pleased with Spell Law, saying that it was "a good example of how a promising company can follow success with botchery." Goldberg found the design complicated, and "The research rules are unbelievably painful to wade through." He believed that a third of the 2000 spells in the book "demand the immediate use of the nearest paper shredder."

In the January 1983 edition of Different Worlds (Issue #26), Arlen Walker took issue with some of the arbitrary rules (wizards can't wear armor, wizards can't cast spells above their own level, etc.), saying, "This inflexible attitude is out of place in a work which presents as much variety as this does." Walker also pointed out that "The box cover claims 'detailed alchemy and research rules.' Well they're half right. The alchemical rules are fairly detailed and good. But there is less than a page of spell research rules." He also criticized the rules, saying their explanations "are not always clear or useful." Walker concluded that the sheer number of spells and the logical method of learning them "make it worth the purchase price, if they are what your game requires. But [...] the rigidity left in the game gets in the way of its enjoyment. With a few minor modifications it could have been so much better."

In the April 1983 edition of The Space Gamer (Issue No. 62), Richard Wolfe, Jr. noted that "It's hard to use the critical hits unless you also have Arms Law and Claw Law. If you have both of these, then I suggest you go ahead and buy Spell Law."

Ronald Pehr reviewed Spell Law for Fantasy Gamer magazine and stated that "Spell Law [...] requires a lot of chart-flipping to use. Also, as with the other books, it presupposes FRP experience."

In the August 1984 edition of Dragon (Issue #88), Arlen Walker was impressed with the variety of spells, and found that the "spell-casting system is somewhat more complicated than in other games, but not unplayably so."
