= Rolemaster Heroes and Rogues =

Rolemaster Heroes and Rogues is a 1990 role-playing supplement for Rolemaster published by Iron Crown Enterprises.

== Contents ==
Rolemaster Heroes and Rogues is a supplement in which a collection of pre-generated characters is presented.

== Reception ==
Herb Petro reviewed RoleMaster Heroes and Rogues in White Wolf #27 (June/July, 1991), rating it a 4 out of 5 and stated that "I find most pre-generated character collections boring and generally not useful. I found RoleMaster Heroes and Rogues to be a pleasant exception."
