= Third World Books and Crafts =

Black owned bookstore in Toronto

Third World Books and Crafts was an independent bookstore last located at 943 Bathurst Street, Toronto. Book columnist Philip Marchand, from the Toronto Star, regarded it as the "nerve center for [B]lack intellectuals in Toronto." Carrying an assortment of literature written by people of African descent, such as C. L. R. James's The Black Jacobins or Walter Rodney's How Europe Underdeveloped Africa, the store was an entry point to a "world of history and ideas" that included the Black community.

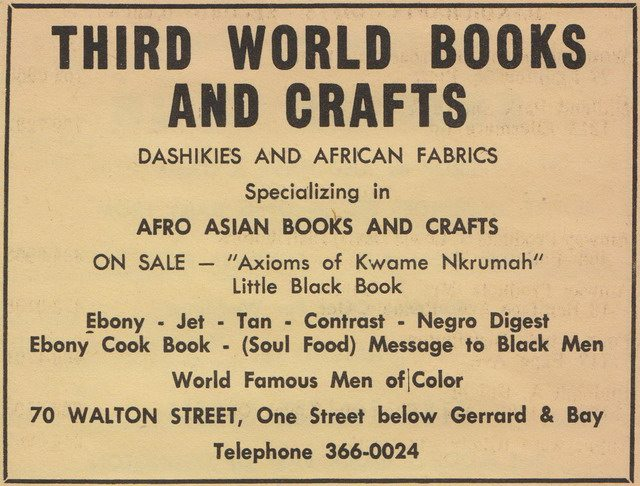
An advertisement from the Black Trade and Business Directory. Specialization: Pan-Africanism, Third-Worldism, Black Consciousness Movement, and Black literature.

== History ==
The store was founded in November 1968 by Leonard and Gwendolyn Johnston. It was originally located at 70 Walton Street before moving to 689 Bay Street, 748 Bay Street, and its final location in the 1980s. Third World Books was open for three decades, closing after Leonard's death in 1998.

The store was "cramped and cosy...lined with [B]lack histories, [B]lack philosophies and [B]lack calls to arms." Its interior was an eclectic mash of Kathleen Cleaver and Malcolm X posters, traditional African masks, baskets and ready-made dashiki. One customer fondly recalled the abundance of books piled on shelves, stacked on tabletops, and crammed in empty crevices.

== Community impact ==
Third World Books functioned as a community center, hosting "book launches, author lectures, seminars, community meetings, debates, and even karate classes," existing as a leisure space and a site for intellectual curiosity. The overall impact of the store was far-reaching, invoked as a place for first encounters with a diverse body of literature. Notable people who frequented the store were: Angela Davis, Michael Jackson, and Quincy Jones while he was researching for Roots.
