= Black Ops =

Black ops are a kind of covert operation.

Black Ops may also refer to:

== Film and television ==
- Black Ops (film), a 2019 horror film
- Black Ops (TV series), a 2023 British comedy thriller series
- Black Ops, an alternative title for Deadwater (film), a 2008 horror film
- Operation Black Ops, 2023 American film

== Video games ==
- Black Ops (developer), a video game developer
- Call of Duty: Black Ops, a 2010 video game by Treyarch
  - Call of Duty: Black Ops II, a 2012 video game
  - Call of Duty: Black Ops III, a 2015 video game
  - Call of Duty: Black Ops 4, a 2018 video game
  - Call of Duty: Black Ops Cold War, a 2020 video game
  - Call of Duty: Black Ops 6, a 2024 video game
  - Call of Duty: Black Ops 7, a 2025 video game
- Call of Duty: Black Ops: Declassified, a video game by NStigate Games for the PS Vita

== Music ==
- "Black Ops", a song by They Might Be Giants from Nanobots
- "Black Ops", a song by Chief Keef from Finally Rollin 2

== Other uses ==
- GURPS Black Ops, a sourcebook for the role-playing game GURPS
- Black Ops (Rolemaster), a supplement for the role-playing game Rolemaster
