= Mythic Egypt =

Role-playing game supplement

insert a caption here

Mythic Egypt is a fantasy role-playing supplement that explains how Ancient Egypt can be used as a fantasy role-playing game setting. The book, which enables players to use the role-playing rules from either Rolemaster or Fantasy Hero, was published by Iron Crown Enterprises (I.C.E.) in 1990, the fifth and final addition to their Campaign Classics series of individual genre books.

== Content ==
The book begins with an introduction explaining how to use the contents, and then is divided into four sections.

The first section, for the players:

- explains how to create a player character for an ancient Egyptian campaign, including information on how to create an alternate race such as sphinx or djinn.
- Egyptian geography and history
- the Egyptian pantheon
- the Kingdom of the Dead
- the Egyptian way of life, including economy, religion, war, social structure, and leisure activities.

The second section, for the gamemaster, has six complete scenarios and five ideas for further scenarios.

The third section describes Egypt and its place in the ancient world.

The fourth section contains statistics and information about non-player characters, monsters, treasures and magic items.

== Publication history ==
I.C.E. published the role-playing system Rolemaster in 1980. Several years later, I.C.E. took over Hero Games and their Hero System of role-playing rules, including the specialized set of rules for fantasy campaigns called Fantasy Hero. As game historian Shannon Appelcline noted, I.C.E. immediately started to produce products that used both their own Rolemaster rules as well as Fantasy Hero, saying, "ICE's fourth new product lines had ties to both Hero [System] and Rolemaster. Their Campaign Classics books detailed historic and mythic backgrounds in excellent one-off sourcebooks that were dual-statted for both systems. There were five in all: Robin Hood (1987), Mythic Greece (1988), Vikings (1989), Pirates (1989), and Mythic Egypt (1990)." Mythic Egypt was a 160-page softcover book written by Earl Wajenburg, with interior art by Elissa Martin, and cover art by David Martin.

== Reception ==
In the January–February 1991 edition of Casus Belli (Issue 61), Anne Vetillard was impressed, saying, "This book really contains treasures!", citing its history of Egypt, mythology, and "interesting details about daily life." She concluded, "Whether you want to taste the atmosphere of a new universe or give another dimension to your 'Valley of the Kings' games, this supplement will suit you perfectly."

Herb Petro reviewed the product in the February–March 1991 issue of White Wolf. He stated that "As an introductory work, Mythic Egypt is to be commended, but the author found himself constrained by the limits of 150 pages and the need to include game relevant material." He rated it overall 4 out of a possible 5 points.

== Other reviews ==
- Papyrus #8 (Fall 1992, p. 1)
