= White magic (disambiguation) =

White magic is magic used for benevolent purposes.

White Magic may also refer to:

- White Magic (band), an American rock band
- White Magic, a 2010 album by Swedish musician ceo
- Kirk Stevens, a snooker player nicknamed "white magic"
- Lacey, a professional wrestler who has also performed under the ring name White Magic
- WhiteMagic, a display technology
- Mephedrone, a drug also known as "white magic"

== See also ==
- Black Magic (disambiguation)
