= The Shade of the Sinking Plain =

Tabletop role-playing game supplement

The Shade of the Sinking Plain is a 1984 fantasy role-playing game adventure published by North Pole Publications for the Rolemaster role-playing game.

== Plot summary ==
The Shade of the Sinking Plain is an adventure in which a huge battle barge preys upon smaller ships on the rivers connected to a swamp.

== Reception ==
Jeff Ong reviewed The Shade of the Sinking Plain in Space Gamer No. 72. Ong commented that "Shade of the Sinking Plain sells for nearly as much as some RPGs cost [...] Unless you are a hardcode hack-and-slasher, try the ICE Rolemaster modules instead, and don't waste your time and money."
