= Sky Giants of the Brass Stair =

Tabletop role-playing game supplement

Cover art by Tony Roberts, 1990

Sky Giants of the Brass Stair is a supplement published by Iron Crown Enterprises (I.C.E.) in 1990 for the fantasy role-playing campaign setting Shadow World.

== Content ==
Sky Giants of the Brass Stair provides details of an isolated corner of Jaiman called Narlshaw, a former dwarven mountaintop realm that was once approached by climbing a 100-mile long brass stairway. Narlshaw, long since abandoned by the dwarves, has changed hands many times since then. The book describes the history of the region and its inhabitants, as well as local economics, politics, military forces, and notable people. According to reviewer Herb Petro, "cities and strongholds are detailed, important personalities are presented, sample adventures laid out, and game relevant stats for NPCs, beasts and military forces are charted".

The book also provides seven adventures set in the region. Players can use either the Rolemaster or the Fantasy Hero system of role-playing game rules.

== Publication history ==
I.C.E. published the role-playing game system Rolemaster in 1980, and immediately introduced the Shadow World campaign setting the same year. In the mid-1980s, I.C.E. took over Hero Games and their Hero System of role-playing rules, including the specialized set of rules for fantasy campaigns called Fantasy Hero. The supplement Sky Giants of the Brass Stair is a 72-page book softcover book that was published by I.C.E. in 1990 using both the Rolemaster and Fantasy Hero rules systems. It was written by Tom Kane, with interior art by Jennell Jaquays (Note: Credited as Paul Jaquays.), cartography by Elissa Martin, and cover art by Tony Roberts.

== Reception ==
Herb Petro reviewed the product in the February–March 1991 issue of White Wolf. He rated it 2 out of a possible 5 points.
