= Norek: Intrigue in a City-State of Jaiman =

Role-playing game supplement

Cover art by David Miller, 1990

Norek: Intrigue in a City-State of Jaiman is a supplement published by Iron Crown Enterprises (I.C.E.) in 1990 for the fantasy role-playing campaign Shadow World that can use either the Rolemaster or the Fantasy Hero role-playing system rules.

== Description ==
In the Shadowlands campaign setting, the city of Norek has been an oasis of peace within the troubled region of Jaiman. However, a hidden agent of evil is now at work within the city. Norek: Intrigue in a City-State of Jaiman provides details of the city and its region, including geography, climate, flora and fauna, notable buildings, and inhabitants. A description is given of the evil now at work in the city and its organization, including notable personalities.

The book the presents nine scenarios that all start within Norek before moving out into the surrounding region. These can either be played as separate adventures, or linked together into a complete campaign:

1. "The Hunt for Guff"
2. "The Ogre's Lair"
3. "A Matter of Loyalty"
4. "The Jewels of Crump's Mound"
5. "The Treachery of Ton Bron"
6. "Where There's a Wlf"
7. "The Rogue's Ruse"
8. "The Necromantic Urge"
9. "The Temple of Cay"

The players can use either the Rolemaster or the Fantasy Hero role-playing rules.

== Publication history ==
I.C.E. published the role-playing system Rolemaster in 1980, and immediately introduced the Shadow World campaign setting the same year. In the mid-1980s, I.C.E. took over Hero Games and their Hero System of role-playing rules, including the specialized set of rules for fantasy campaigns called Fantasy Hero. The supplement Norek: Intrigue in a City-State of Jaiman was published by I.C.E. in 1990 as an 88-page softcover book written by Kevin Hosmer-Casey, with interior and cover art by David Miller, and cartography by David and Elissa Martin, and Kevin Williams.

== Reception ==
Herb Petro reviewed the product in the February–March 1991 issue of White Wolf. He stated, "This book is useful for those looking for adventure ideas in Jaiman and Shadow World, and those who want a more complete understanding of Jaiman and Shadow World." He rated it overall at 3 points of a possible 5.
