= Rolemaster Companion =

Fantasy role-playing supplement

Rolemaster Companion is a supplement published by Iron Crown Enterprises (I.C.E.) in 1986 for the fantasy role-playing game system Rolemaster.

== Contents ==
Rolemaster Companion is a supplement in which new content and refinements are introduced. It replaces some original mechanics with charts for stat bonuses, development points, and spell points. Eight new character professions expand player options, including Barbarians, Burglars, Druids (a variant of Animists), and semi-spell users like Delvers, Paladins, and Nightblades. Two powerful additions—the High Warrior Monk and the Archmage—offer significant capabilities. The supplement introduces Arcane Magic, a pre-divisional form of spellcasting that blends elements of Essence, Channeling, and Mentalism. The supplement also includes extensive new spell lists, ranging from level 1 to 100, with some spells capable of continent-scale destruction. Background options include split personalities and destiny sense. Additional content includes new races like dark elves and half-orcs, new monsters such as Black Reavers, and enhanced magical items with personalities and willpower that can contest control with their wielders.

== Publication history ==
In 1980, I.C.E. published the fantasy role-playing game Rolemaster. A second edition was published in 1984, and this was accompanied by over a dozen related publications, including Rolemaster Companion, a 96-page book written by R. Mark Colburn with Coleman Charlton, with cover art by Angus McBride and interior art by Denis Loubet, and published by I.C.E. in 1986. The second edition was published in 1987 and includes an errata sheet.

Shannon Appelcline noted that "After publishing a second edition (1986), ICE introduced a series of yearly rule supplements, beginning with Rolemaster Companion (1986). Each of these books offered new spell lists, new classes and other new rule systems for Rolemaster. One the one hand it seemed a good direction for a rules-heavy system but on the other hand it highlighted the system's weakness by making it even more complex and convoluted with every release. Some would also complain about poor playtesting and lack of balance in the Companions."

== Reception ==
In Issue 39 of Abyss, John Davies called this "an omnibus volume which expands the mechanics and world of Rolemaster in many directions." Davies did note some unevenness in quality "but some sections really enhance the system, particularly the magic sections, and the others are yours to take or leave." Davies concluded, "This is the sort of aid that every good, growing system needs, and I hope that I.C.E. goes on to produce more such companions.

John S. Davies reviewed The Rolemaster Companion for Adventurer magazine and stated that "All in all this is a lovely additon [sic] to Rolemaster, well up to I.C.E.'s usual standard, and any serious GM should have no second thoughts about adding it to their collection."

In Issue 26 of the Spanish game magazine Revistas Lider Juegos de Rol & Simulacion, Oscar Estefanía worried that too much detail provided by the Companion could be overwhelming, writing "in my opinion, some of these expansions are entirely unnecessary."

== Other reviews ==
- The Guild Companion (May 2001)
