= Nomads of the Nine Nations =

Role-playing game supplement

Cover art by Richard Hescox

Nomads of the Nine Nations is a supplement published by Iron Crown Enterprises (I.C.E.) in 1990 for the fantasy role-playing campaign setting Shadow World that uses either the Rolemaster or the Fantasy Hero role-playing rules system.

== Description ==
Nomads of the Nine Nations introduces a new campaign region, the vast plains on the isle of Thuul that are inhabited by a nomadic people called the Jan. The book provides details of the Jan culture, including:

- the geography, climate, and the flora and fauna of the plains;
- physical appearances and dress of the nine different tribes of the Jan, as well as their languages, history, beliefs, laws and taboos;
- social organization
- notable personalities
- military aspects of the society, including weapons
- magic specific to the Jan

Some ideas for adventures are presented, as well as six short scenarios.

Players can use either the role-playing rules for Rolemaster, or the rules for Fantasy Hero.

== Publication history ==
I.C.E. published the role-playing system Rolemaster in 1980, and immediately introduced the Shadow World campaign setting the same year. In the mid-1980s, I.C.E. took over Hero Games and their Hero System of role-playing rules, including the specialized set of rules for fantasy campaigns called Fantasy Hero. The supplement Nomads of the Nine Nations was published ten years later in 1990, a 72-page softcover book written by Brian E. Potter, with illustrations by Jeff Menges, cartography by Kevin Williams, and cover art by Richard Hescox.

== Reception ==
Herb Petro reviewed the product in a 1991 issue of White Wolf Magazine, noting it would be useful for those looking for something different in the Shadow World realm, and gave it an average rating of 3 out of a possible 5 overall.
