= Spell User's Companion =

Spell User's Companion is a 1991 role-playing supplement for Rolemaster published by Iron Crown Enterprises.

== Contents ==
Spell User's Companion is a supplement in which the nature of magic and its minutiae is detailed.

== Reception ==
Herb Petro reviewed Spell User's Companion in White Wolf #31 (May/June, 1992), rating it a 4 out of 5 and stated that "there is a checklist [...] of all the options in this product, allowing a GM to more easily summarize what he will and won't be using. I highly recommend this product to all RoleMaster players, many MERP players, and anyone interested in the development of the art of magic."

== Reviews ==
- Backstab
