= The World of Vog Mur =

Role-playing game supplement

The World of Vog Mur is a 1984 fantasy role-playing game supplement published by Iron Crown Enterprises for the Rolemaster role-playing game.

== Contents ==
The World of Vog Mur is a campaign setting composed of three small islands, with the only human inhabitants of the area living on the largest island called Dalov Peril.

== Reception ==
Jeff Ong reviewed The World of Vog Mur in Space Gamer No. 72. Ong commented that "World of Vog Mur will keep a group occupied for months of real time. Even if used only to add a little color to a campaign, it is definitely worth its [...] price."
