= Black literature =

Black literature is literature created by or for Black people. For more, see:

- African literature
- African-American literature
- Afro-Brazilian literature
- Black British#Writers
- Black Canadians#Culture
- Caribbean literature
- Haitian literature

== See also ==
- Black art (disambiguation)
- Négritude
- Category:African diaspora literature
- Category:Writers of African descent
