= Treasure Companion =

Tabletop role-playing game supplement

- Editor: John W. Curtis III
- Author: Bob Mohney
- Illustrator: K.C. Lancaster, Wayne Reynolds
- Cover artist: David Martin
- Language: English
- Series: Rolemaster Standard System
- Genre: Role-playing game supplement
- Publisher: Iron Crown Enterprises
- Publication date: 1996
- Publication place: United States
- Media type: Print (softcover)
- Pages: 144
- ISBN: 978-1-55806-254-2

Treasure Companion is a 1996 fantasy role-playing game supplement written by Bob Mohney and published by Iron Crown Enterprises (ICE) for the third edition of Rolemaster, the Rolemaster Standard System (RMSS).

== Publication history ==
Treasure Companion was released in 1996 as a 144-page softcover supplement for the Rolemaster Standard System, with stock code ICE 5601. The book was designed by Bob Mohney and edited by John W. Curtis III, with a cover illustration by David Martin and interior art by K.C. Lancaster and Wayne Reynolds. A revised edition was published in 2000 for the Rolemaster Fantasy Role Playing (RMFRP) line, the fourth edition of Rolemaster.

== Contents ==
Treasure Companion is a supplement which contains basic information about topics including alchemy and gemstones, and sections about using and abusing wealth. The book introduces three new Alchemist professions — one for each of the three realms of magic (Channeling, Essence, and Mentalism) — along with 22 alchemist spell lists, including four general alchemy base lists and three divine alchemy lists. It also contains descriptions of over 100 unique magic items and tables for generating treasure, with a detailed system for generating gemstones and jewelry, as well as guidelines for magic item management and the buying and selling of magic items. The volume is organized into two main parts: a discussion of the concepts of treasure, wealth, and economics in a fantasy setting, followed by rules for integrating these concepts with the core Rolemaster system, including Arms Law, Spell Law, and Gamemaster Law.

== Reception ==
David Taylor reviewed Treasure Companion for Arcane magazine, rating it a 7 out of 10 overall. Taylor commented that "It's a bit much that we need a separate supplement to deal with treasure, better coverage in the standard system would have sufficed. As the game stands, though, this Companion should settle a good few arguments. But whether you need this degree of detail will very much depend on your style of game."
