= Space Master Companion =

Space Master Companion is a 1987 role-playing game supplement published by Iron Crown Enterprises for Space Master.

== Contents ==
Space Master Companion is a supplement in which new professions, weapons, vehicles, psionic powers, gamemaster guidelines, Imperial history, eight alien races, planetary‑generation rules, and additional expansion material are added.

== Publication history ==
Space Master Companion was written by Tod Foley and Terry Amthor, with a cover by Rick Britton and illustrations by Jason Waltrip, and published by Iron Crown Enterprises in 1987 as a 112-page book.

== Reviews ==
- Abyss #35 (Summer, 1985)
- Polyhedron #70
