= Dark magic (disambiguation) =

Dark magic is the use of supernatural powers for selfish purposes.

Dark magic may also refer to:

- Dark Magic (film), a 1939 American comedy short film
- Dark Magic (novel), a 2000 novel by Christine Feehan
- Dark Magick, a 2001 novel by Cate Tiernan

== See also ==
- Black Magic (disambiguation)
- Dark arts (disambiguation)
