= Run Out the Guns! Adventure Kit =

- Series: Roadmaster
- Publisher: Iron Crown Enterprises
- Publication date: 1998
- ISBN: 1-55806-365-X

Run Out the Guns! Adventure Kit is a 1998 role-playing game supplement published by Iron Crown Enterprises for Rolemaster.

== Contents ==
Run Out the Guns! Adventure Kit is a supplement in which the Golden Age of Piracy is detailed.

== Reviews ==
- Backstab #11
- Pyramid
- Casus Belli #116
