= Black art =

Black art may refer to:

- African-American art
- Black Art, record label run by Jamaican producer Lee "Scratch" Perry
- Black Arts Movement
  - Black Art (poem), written by Amiri Baraka
- Black art (theatre), an optical effect in stage magic

== See also ==
- Black Magic (disambiguation)
- Black Ops (disambiguation)
- Black Paintings, a group of 14 paintings by Francisco Goya
- Blackwork, a form of embroidery generally worked in black thread
- African art
- Dark arts (disambiguation)
