= Tito Ortiz =

American mixed martial arts fighter (born 1975)

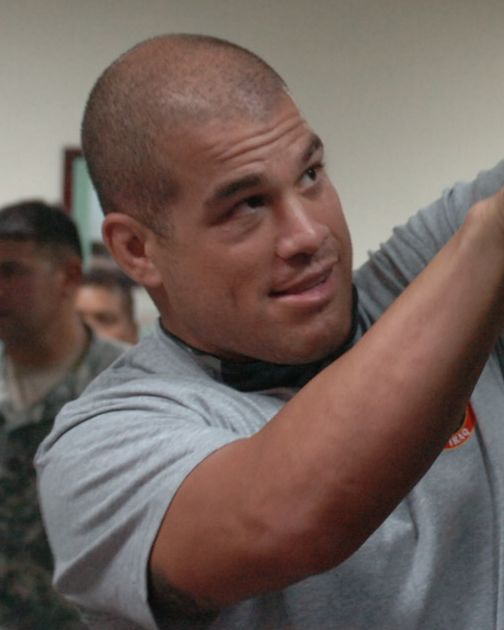

Mayor pro tempore of Huntington Beach, California
- In office December 7, 2020 – June 1, 2021

Member of the Huntington Beach City Council
- In office December 7, 2020 – June 1, 2021

Personal details
- Born: Jacob Christopher Ortiz; January 23, 1975 (age 51) Huntington Beach, California, U.S.
- Party: Republican
- Spouse: Kristin (m. 2000–2005) Amber Nicole Ortiz (m. 2022)
- Domestic partner: Jenna Jameson (2006–2013)
- Children: 3
- Occupation: Mixed martial artist
- Martial arts career
- Other names: The Huntington Beach Bad Boy
- Height: 6 ft 2 in (188 cm)
- Weight: 205 lb (93 kg; 14 st 9 lb)
- Division: Light Heavyweight (1997–2017); Heavyweight (2018–2019)
- Reach: 74 in (188 cm)
- Fighting out of: Huntington Beach, California
- Team: Team Punishment; RVCA Training Center
- Years active: 1997–2012, 2014–2017, 2018–2019 (MMA); 2021 (Boxing)

Professional boxing record
- Total: 1
- Losses: 1
- By knockout: 1

Mixed martial arts record
- Total: 34
- Wins: 21
- By knockout: 10
- By submission: 5
- By decision: 6
- Losses: 12
- By knockout: 5
- By submission: 2
- By decision: 5
- Draws: 1

Other information
- University: California State University, Bakersfield
- Notable club: Punishment Training Center
- Notable school: Huntington Beach High School
- Website: titoortiz.com
- Mixed martial arts record from Sherdog
Medal record
Representing United States
Men's Grappling
ADCC World Championships
Bronze medal – third place	2000 Abu Dhabi	99 kg
- Last updated on: September 15, 2011

Jacob Christopher "Tito" Ortiz (/ˈtiːtoʊ ɔːrˈtiːz/ TEE-toh or-TEEZ; born January 23, 1975) is an American former mixed martial artist, politician, and professional boxer, of Mexican descent. He is best known for his career with the Ultimate Fighting Championship (UFC), where he is a former UFC Light Heavyweight Champion, having held the title from April 2000 to September 2003. Along with fighters like Randy Couture and Chuck Liddell, he was one of the sport's early stars. Ortiz ultimately became the biggest pay-per-view draw of 2006 for his fights with Liddell, Forrest Griffin, and Ken Shamrock. On July 7, 2012, Ortiz became the ninth inductee into the UFC Hall of Fame.

On November 5, 2020, Ortiz was announced as one of the winners of the Huntington Beach City Council election, becoming Mayor pro tempore. Sworn into office on December 7, 2020, he resigned from the city council less than six months later on June 1, 2021.

Ortiz made his professional boxing debut on September 11, 2021, in a round one loss to fellow former UFC champion Anderson Silva.

== Early life and education ==
Ortiz is of Mexican descent. At the age of nineteen, Ortiz met Paul Herrera, an assistant wrestling coach at Golden West College. Herrera encouraged Ortiz to attend Golden West, where he was a California junior college state champion and All-American for two consecutive years. He finished with a 58-1 record with his only loss being to top ranked Kevin Allan of Gavilan College before transferring to California State University, Bakersfield, where he continued wrestling but was never a full-time starter. Ortiz also trained with UFC fighter and fellow collegiate wrestler, Tank Abbott.

== Mixed martial arts ==
=== Ultimate Fighting Championship ===
Ortiz's mixed martial arts debut was at UFC 13 in 1997. Still in college, Ortiz competed as an amateur for no prize money or contracts. He beat Wes Albritton in an alternate bout by referee stoppage at 0:31 of the first round. He was selected to face Guy Mezger in the Light Heavyweight final after Enson Inoue could not continue due to injury. Despite dominating Mezger at first, Ortiz lost the fight at 2:00 in the first round by a guillotine choke submission. After returning with a TKO victory over Jeremy Screeton at West Coast NHB Championships 1, Ortiz fought top ranked fighter and UFC 12 Light Heavyweight Tournament Champion Jerry Bohlander at UFC 18. Ortiz dominated the fight and won via TKO due to cut stoppage. Ortiz then avenged his loss to Mezger at UFC 19 by TKO. Ortiz's post fight antics towards Mezger and the Lion's Den led to his long-running rivalry with the team's leader Ken Shamrock.

Ortiz has credited UFC Heavyweight Champion Bas Rutten for inspiration during his early days. Ortiz said; "I looked up to Bas Rutten. Bas was my idol. People were just so scared of fighting him, he was like the man. I thought that was what I need to do now. If I train as hard as he does then one day I'll be as good as him and two years later look where I am, I'm on top of the world. I've got to say thanks to him, (Bas) for helping me out by making me believe in dreams."

In 1999, Ortiz fought Frank Shamrock for what is now known as the UFC Light Heavyweight Championship at UFC 22. Despite controlling Shamrock for the majority of the fight, Ortiz ended up losing via submission due to strikes. Following the victory, Shamrock retired and vacated the championship. The Middleweight division was then officially renamed the Light Heavyweight (205 lb) division and Ortiz was chosen, along with Wanderlei Silva, as a top contender. Ortiz defeated Silva for the vacant Light Heavyweight Championship at UFC 25 via unanimous decision. He went on to defend the Light Heavyweight Championship a then-record five times in the following three years, defeating Yuki Kondo, Evan Tanner, Elvis Sinosic, Vladimir Matyushenko and Lion's Den head Ken Shamrock.

At UFC 44, after a near year-long layoff from the sport, Ortiz fought the new Interim Light Heavyweight Champion Randy Couture, who had defeated Chuck Liddell for the interim title at UFC 43 in September 2003. Couture defeated Ortiz via unanimous decision. The loss ended Ortiz's near three-and-a-half-year title reign, which was the longest Light Heavyweight Championship reign until Jon Jones successfully defended the Light Heavyweight Championship for the sixth time on September 21, 2013. Following his loss to Couture, Ortiz faced Chuck Liddell at UFC 47, losing by TKO in the second round. After six months off, Ortiz returned and took a unanimous decision victory over newcomer Patrick Côté at UFC 50 and a split decision over Vitor Belfort at UFC 51.

In February 2005, Ortiz took time away from the UFC and was offered deals with several promotions, including PRIDE Fighting Championships and the Don King-backed World Fighting Alliance. Ortiz and fellow fighter Fabiano Iha even hired investment banker Stan Medley to take a new league, The Xtreme Fighting Championship, public. But none of these endeavors came to fruition. Ortiz opted to try his hand at professional wrestling, signing with Total Nonstop Action Wrestling as a guest referee.

In November 2005, UFC president Dana White announced Ortiz and Ken Shamrock would coach The Ultimate Fighter 3 reality TV series on Spike TV, which premiered in April 2006. Ortiz's first fight in his return occurred at UFC 59 on April 15, 2006, against previous The Ultimate Fighter 1 winner Forrest Griffin. Ortiz won via split decision (30–27, 28–29, and 29–27). This fight earned him his first Fight of the Night award.

His next fight was against UFC Hall of Famer Ken Shamrock at UFC 61 on July 8, 2006, a match which was to conclude a main rivalry on The Ultimate Fighter 3. Shamrock lost in the first round by TKO due to strikes (elbows) by Ortiz.This fight earned him another Fight of the Night award.

On August 25, 2006, at the UFC 62 weigh-ins, Dana White announced a rematch between Ortiz and Shamrock for October 10, 2006, on Spike TV, as the main event of Ortiz vs. Shamrock 3: The Final Chapter. Ortiz beat Shamrock for the third time in this fight, which was stopped in the first round due to strikes. On December 30, 2006, at UFC 66, Ortiz's rematch with Chuck Liddell (for the UFC Light Heavyweight championship) ended in defeat via referee stoppage in the third round. This fight earned him a Knockout of the Night award.

He then fought against undefeated The Ultimate Fighter 2 winner Rashad Evans on July 7, 2007, at UFC 73. Ortiz took charge of the fight from the outset, taking Evans down and controlling him. In the second round Ortiz once again took control and nearly submitted Evans before the culmination of the round. The fight ended in a draw after Ortiz was penalized for grabbing the fence. Ortiz's last fight on his contract with the UFC was a unanimous decision loss to the then undefeated Lyoto Machida at UFC 84 on May 24, 2008. All three judges scored the fight 30–27 to Machida. Ortiz came close to submitting Machida in the third round with a triangle choke before transitioning to an armbar. However, Machida managed to escape and survived the round, winning a unanimous judges' decision. The fight concluded Ortiz's stay with the promotion as he chose not to re-sign, citing his frustration with UFC president Dana White as a major factor in the decision.

=== Outside the UFC ===
After leaving the UFC, Ortiz was approached by multiple promotions, including the now defunct Elite Xtreme Combat, Affliction and the American Fight League. However, a clause in his old UFC contract forbade him from signing with or fighting for any other organization until approximately April–June 2009. Until his return to the UFC, Ortiz was considered the biggest free agent on the market.

On October 6, 2008, Ortiz underwent back surgery in Las Vegas, Nevada. According to his website, he had been experiencing back pain since his fight with Randy Couture.

On Wednesday, December 17, 2008, Affliction Entertainment announced that Ortiz would be part of the broadcast team for the Affliction: Day of Reckoning. Ortiz had said he would fight again in August 2009, but this did not occur.

=== Return to the UFC ===
As part of his comeback to the UFC, Ortiz began training with his original Brazilian jiu-jitsu and Judo instructor Cleber Luciano (a student of Royler Gracie). Ortiz originally briefly trained with Luciano back in 1997, when he was still a student at Golden West College.

On July 17, 2009, both Ortiz and Dana White stated that the pair had made amends. One week later, White announced that he re-signed Tito. Ortiz stated he is returning for a six-fight deal he and White have worked out. White officially announced Ortiz's return in a conference call on July 31, 2009. White mentioned that "everyone wants to see Tito fight" and "Tito will retire in the UFC." Mark Coleman was named as Ortiz's opponent for his return to the octagon at UFC 106. However, Coleman pulled out of this bout due to a second-degree tear of his MCL, and was replaced by Forrest Griffin.

Due to an illness to UFC Heavyweight Champion Brock Lesnar, Ortiz's fight with Griffin was promoted to the headliner of UFC 106. Griffin won the fight via split decision, showing superior striking ability. Whilst Ortiz was able to secure takedowns in the first and second rounds, Griffin showed considerable improvement since their first fight and kept the fight standing throughout the third, leading to the split decision victory.

On December 5, it was announced Ortiz would coach the 11th season of The Ultimate Fighter, with the opposing coach being Chuck Liddell. He was scheduled to fight Liddell again for the third time at the end of the season and later pulled out of the bout. On April 7, 2010, UFC president Dana White said Liddell vs. Ortiz 3 was scheduled to be the main event for UFC 115. However, on April 12, 2010, the UFC confirmed the main event for the card was Liddell vs. Rich Franklin.

Ortiz fought Matt Hamill on October 23, 2010, at UFC 121. Hamill was Ortiz's first overall pick during Season 3 of the Ultimate Fighter. Ortiz lost the fight via unanimous decision.

UFC President Dana White hinted at Tito Ortiz's possible release from the UFC in a post-fight interview after UFC 121 stating that 'We all know what happens when guys lose four fights in the UFC'. There had been no official statement to confirm this, however. On November 7, in a response to a fan via his Twitter, Ortiz stated that he would again fight in the UFC.

Ortiz was expected to face Antônio Rogério Nogueira on March 26, 2011, at UFC Fight Night 24. UFC president Dana White said that he had expected to cut Ortiz loose from the UFC after his loss to Hamill, but decided to give him one last chance against Nogueira. Ortiz received a cut above his eye and a concussion while training for his fight with Nogueira and was forced to withdraw. He was replaced by Phil Davis.

Ortiz took on Ryan Bader on July 2, 2011, at UFC 132. Coming in as a heavy underdog, with his UFC career on the line (despite stating that in his previous 5 fights, he'd been plagued by injury), Ortiz dropped Bader with strikes and submitted him using a guillotine choke at 1:56 of the first round, thus securing his first victory since 2006 and saving his UFC career. The victory earned him a $75,000 "Submission of the Night" bonus award.

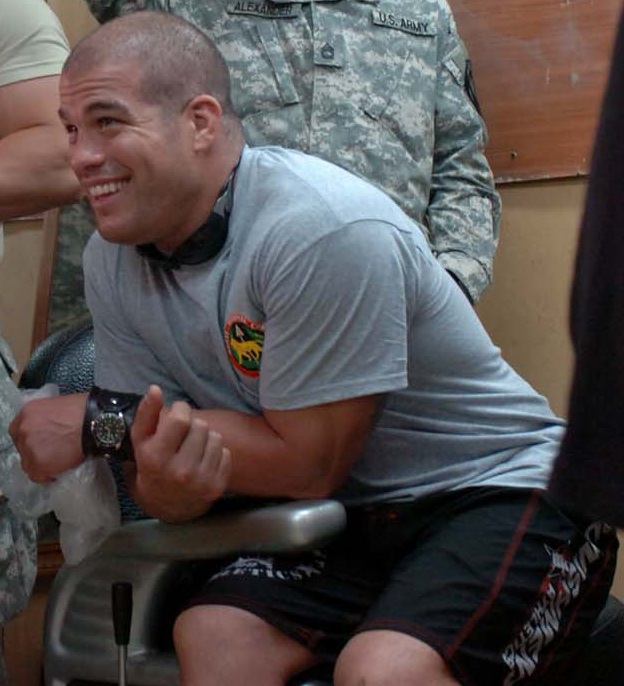
Ortiz in June 2008

In a rematch against Rashad Evans on August 6, 2011, at UFC 133, in which he replaced an injured Phil Davis on two weeks' notice, Ortiz lost in the second round by TKO via strikes, despite nearly finishing Evans in round one with a guillotine. Despite the loss, this fight earned him a $70,000 Fight of the Night award.

Ortiz faced Antônio Rogério Nogueira on December 10, 2011, at UFC 140. He lost the fight via TKO in the first round. He would state after the fight that he had suffered a neck injury before the fight, but decided to fight anyway in the hope of bringing the fans a victory.

Ortiz then stated he would retire after his next fight, the last of his contract, against Forrest Griffin at UFC 148.

Ortiz faced Forrest Griffin for a third time on July 7, 2012, at UFC 148. Ortiz was inducted into the UFC Hall of Fame prior to his final bout. He lost in a $75,000 Fight of the Night winning performance (despite landing 2 knockdowns and 2 takedowns to Griffin's zero).

=== Brief retirement ===
Following his loss to Griffin, Ortiz retired from MMA and started up a management company, Primetime 360 Entertainment & Sports Management Inc. The management team would pick up Cristiane "Cyborg" Justino as its first high-profile client. He came out of retirement to fight in Bellator MMA.

On February 14, 2014, Tito Ortiz stepped down as manager for Cristiane "Cyborg" Justino.

=== Bellator MMA ===
On July 31, 2013, it was announced that Ortiz would come out of retirement to face former training partner and fellow former UFC Light heavyweight Champion Quinton Jackson on November 2, 2013, at Bellator 106. However, on October 25, it was announced that Ortiz suffered a neck injury and had to pull out of his fight with Jackson. Despite having to deal with another injury, Ortiz said that he would still focus on a return to the cage and then Bellator President Bjorn Rebney said that they still wanted to see Ortiz compete in their organization.

Ortiz faced Bellator Middleweight champion Alexander Shlemenko, in a match up at Light Heavyweight, in his Bellator debut on May 17, 2014, at Bellator 120. He won via first round arm-triangle choke submission. In his victory speech, he was dismissive of the UFC for the company's attempts to remove him from their history, calling it "bullshit" and stated that he will "live in the MMA memory forever".

Ortiz faced fellow UFC Hall of Famer Stephan Bonnar on November 15, 2014, at Bellator 131. He won via split decision.

On June 19, 2015, it was announced that Ortiz would face Liam McGeary for the Bellator Light Heavyweight Championship. The match eventually took place on September 19, 2015, at Bellator 142: Dynamite 1. Ortiz lost the fight via inverted triangle choke in the first round.

In his fourth fight for the promotion, Ortiz faced fellow UFC veteran Chael Sonnen on January 21, 2017, in the main event at Bellator 170. Before the fight Ortiz announced this would be his last mixed martial arts fight. He won via rear-naked choke in first round.

=== Third bout against Chuck Liddell ===
In August 2018, it was announced by Golden Boy Promotions that Ortiz would be coming out of retirement to face his rival Chuck Liddell in a third fight. The fight took place on November 24, 2018, at The Forum in Inglewood, California. Ortiz won the fight by knockout in the first round.

=== Combate Americas ===
In April 2019, it was announced the Ortiz had signed a multi-fight agreement with the Combate Americas promotion. Later, Ortiz revealed that the contract covers three fights and two years. The time of his promotional debut was set for the fall of 2019. On July 9, 2019, it was announced that Ortiz's debut opponent would be former WWE Champion and Combate Americas President Alberto El Patrón in a 210-pound Catchweight bout at Combate Americas event in Hidalgo, Texas on December 7, 2019. Ortiz won the fight via rear-naked choke submission in the first round. On February 26, 2020, it was announced that the result had been temporarily overturned to a no decision by the Texas State Athletic Commission for reasons that have not yet been disclosed. However, on February 28, it was announced that Ortiz consumed muscle relaxers, so the issue had been resolved and the result was turned back to a win for Ortiz.

== Professional wrestling ==
=== Total Nonstop Action Wrestling ===
==== Sporadic appearances (2005) ====
In May 2005, Ortiz made an appearance for the professional wrestling promotion Total Nonstop Action Wrestling (TNA). On May 15, 2005, at Hard Justice Ortiz served as special guest referee in the NWA World Heavyweight Championship title match between champion Jeff Jarrett and challenger A.J. Styles at the behest of Director of Authority Dusty Rhodes. The conclusion of the match saw Ortiz knock out Jarrett with a right hook after Jarrett shoved him, which allowed Styles to hit his "Spiral Tap" for the pinfall victory and claim the NWA World Heavyweight Championship. Ortiz returned to TNA on the edition of October 1 of TNA Impact! and the following week he was revealed as the special guest referee for the NWA World Heavyweight Championship match between Jeff Jarrett and Kevin Nash at the Bound for Glory pay-per-view, in a segment, where he grabbed the number one contender Nash in a rear naked choke in order to prevent him from brawling with Jarrett. On October 23 at Bound for Glory Ortiz refereed the match for the title between Jarrett and Rhino, a last minute replacement for Nash. The matched ended with Ortiz knocking out America's Most Wanted (Chris Harris and James Storm), two of Jarrett's associates who attempted to interfere in the match, and then counted the pinfall for Rhino to crown him the new NWA World Heavyweight Champion.

==== Return and Aces & Eights (2013) ====
My time at TNA was great. They treated me really well. Dixie Carter was really, really good to me. During the time I was there, I got a chance to meet Hulk Hogan. I was really happy with that, but I mean, right now my main career is fighting. I mean, I love to fight, and that's what I wanna do. That's with Bellator.

— Tito Ortiz, in his September 2014 interview with Submission Radio.

Ortiz returned to TNA on August 1, 2013, revealing himself as the man behind the cryptic #August1Warning tweets and YouTube videos and staring down the Aces & Eights and The Main Event Mafia, which included his Bellator 106 opponent Quinton Jackson. The following week, Ortiz returned to explain his reason for being in TNA, but he was interrupted by Kurt Angle who declared his respect for Ortiz, and later Bully Ray who declared his disrespect for both men. On August 15 at Impact Wrestling: Hardcore Justice, Ortiz was picked by Jackson to sub for Angle in the Main Event Mafia to take on Aces & Eights, which Ortiz left up in the air before he was again interrupted and insulted by Bully Ray. During the main event of the evening, Ortiz turned on Jackson by hitting him with a hammer and allowed Ray to win the TNA World Heavyweight Championship from Chris Sabin. The following week, Ortiz officially joined Aces & Eights. However, on Impact Wrestling: No Surrender, it was announced that Bellator MMA had pulled Ortiz from TNA programming due to his upcoming PPV fight with Rampage Jackson, thus removing him from Aces & Eights. Ortiz has since parted ways with TNA.

== Boxing ==
Ortiz made his professional boxing debut against former UFC Middleweight Champion Anderson Silva on September 11, 2021. He lost via knockout in the first round.

== Acting ==
Ortiz made a cameo in the 2008 comedy Zombie Strippers as the bouncer of the Rhino. In addition, he has a cameo in Jet Li's Cradle 2 the Grave, as well as co-starring in The Crow: Wicked Prayer. Ortiz was a playable character in the 2000 video game Razor Freestyle Scooter. Tito also played a minor role in Turkish film Valley of the Wolves: Iraq, and briefly appeared in Korn's music video "Got the Life", as well as portraying American symbol Uncle Sam in the band Seether's music video for the song "Truth." He portrayed Det. Pierce in Trauma Center.

He also appeared on Hell's Kitchen where he sat at the chef's table. He also appeared on MADtv. Tito played an MMA fighter named Derek Petrov on an episode of CSI: NY titled "Clean Sweep", which aired on January 6, 2012, on CBS. In 2017, Ortiz co-starred in the film Boo 2! A Madea Halloween.

== Huntington Beach City Council (2020–2021) ==
=== Election ===
In 2020, Ortiz ran for a city council seat in his hometown of Huntington Beach, with the intention of eventually becoming the mayor. (Huntington Beach does not elect mayors directly, but the mayor is chosen from among city councilmembers.) On November 5, 2020, Ortiz was elected as one of the winners of the open seats. On December 7, 2020, Ortiz was sworn in as Mayor Pro Tempore of Huntington Beach.

=== Tenure ===
On November 30, 2020, Ortiz led a "curfew breaker" protest against COVID-19 regulations on the Huntington Beach pier.

In January 2021, Ortiz recognized Andrew Diaz for contributions to his personal life.

In May 2021, it surfaced that Ortiz had filed for unemployment in February 2021 despite not being unemployed or underemployed.

Ortiz resigned from the city council on June 1, 2021 after less than six months in office.

=== Political positions ===
Ortiz is a longtime supporter of President Donald Trump. As a tribute to Trump's slogan "Make America Great Again", Ortiz chose "Make Huntington Beach Safe Again" as his campaign slogan for the 2020 election. Ortiz has stated his skepticism to COVID-19, calling it "the flu," and a form of "population control." He has also declared his support for law enforcement, legal immigration and the second amendment.

In January 2021, Ortiz was refused service at a TK Burgers restaurant for not wearing a mask, and posted his experience on Instagram. Ortiz has since apologized, saying "I understand this is a small business and I would never want to ruin that business."

== Personal life ==
=== Relationships and children ===
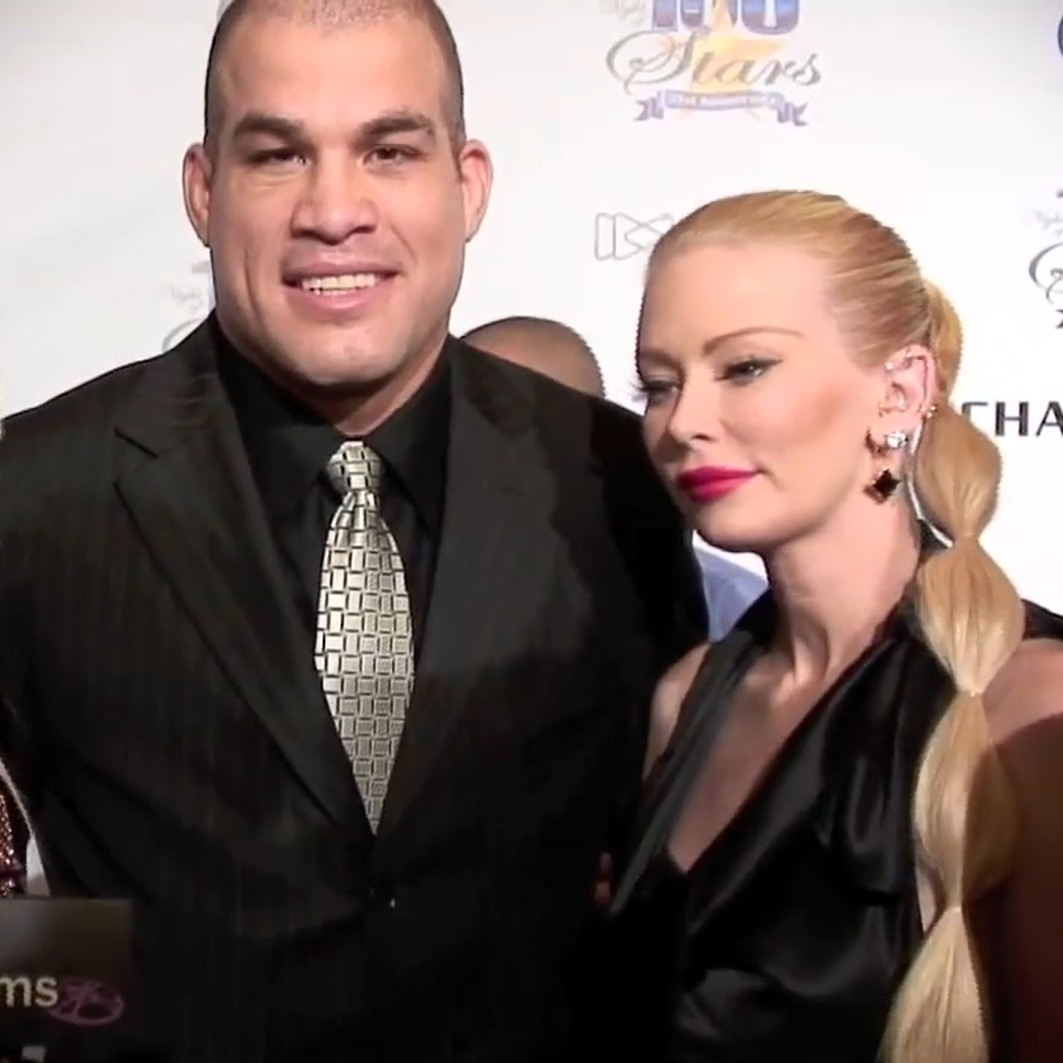
Ortiz with Jenna Jameson in 2011

Ortiz was married to his first wife, Kristin, for five years, and they divorced in 2005. They have a son. In 2006, he began dating former adult film star Jenna Jameson. On March 16, 2009, Jameson gave birth to their twin boys.

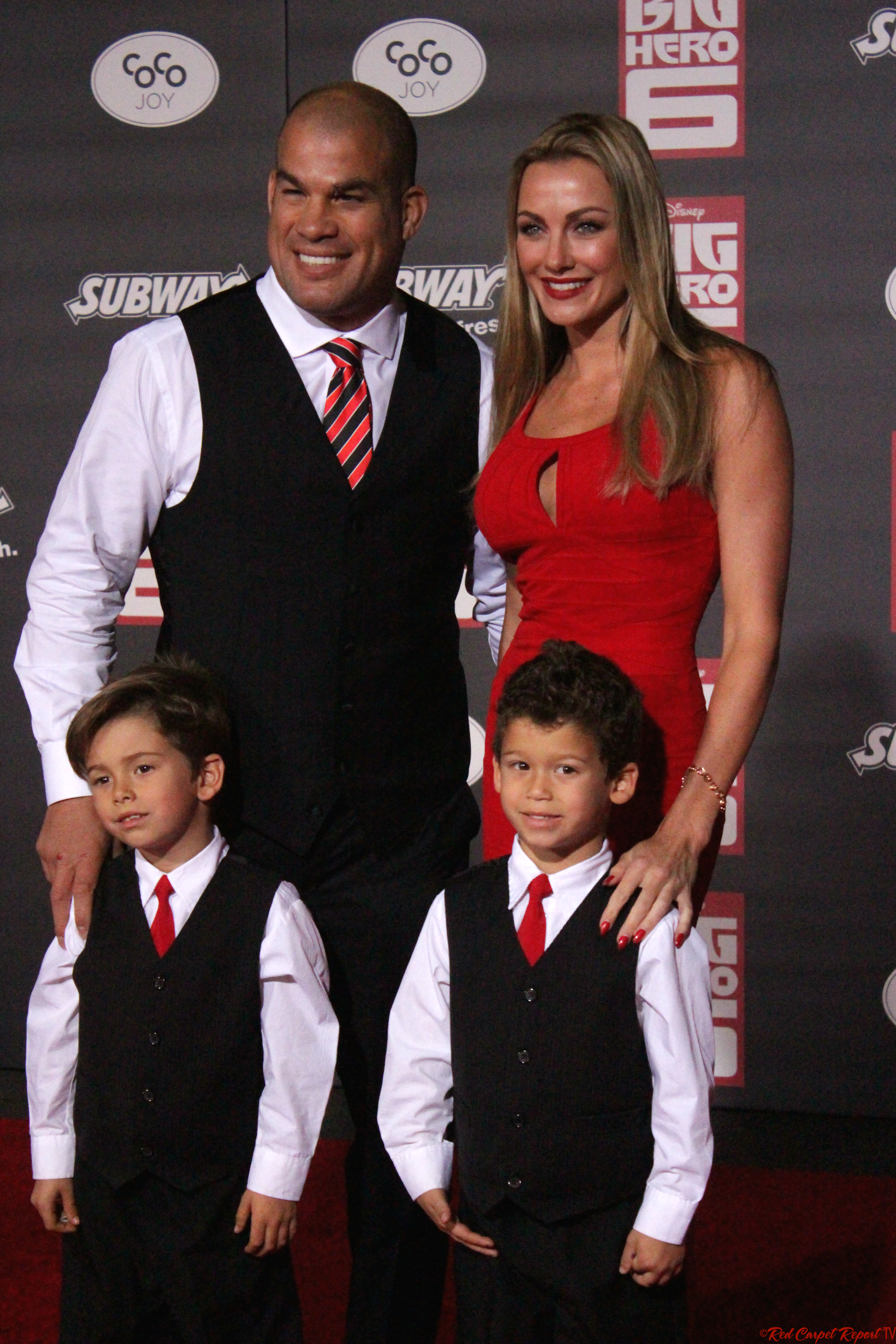
Ortiz with girlfriend Amber Nichole Miller and two of his sons in November 2014

In 2014, Ortiz began dating model Amber Nichole Miller. The two had worked together in the UFC as a fighter and Octagon Girl respectively. The pair married on November 11, 2022.

=== Legal issues ===
Ortiz was arrested on DUI charges in Los Angeles on January 6, 2014. He was sentenced to three years probation, an undisclosed fine, and an obligation to enroll in an alcohol education program.

=== Poker ===
Ortiz describes his poker playing as a hobby, and in March 2017, he placed 22nd in the $5,300 No Limit Hold'em PokerStars Championship Main Event in Panama. Additionally, he has appeared on Shark Cage, Live at the Bike, and a number of private tournaments.

=== Business ventures ===
In late summer 2023, Ortiz opened Tito's Cantina Tequila Bar & Grille in Cape Coral, Florida.

Ortiz is the CEO of Punishment Athletics MMA equipment and clothing line, which is located in his hometown of Huntington Beach, California.

== Championships and accomplishments ==
- Huntington Beach Sports Hall of Fame – Class of 2026

=== Mixed martial arts ===
- Martial Arts History Museum Hall of Fame – Class of 2020
- Ultimate Fighting Championship
  - UFC Hall of Fame (Pioneer Wing, Class of 2012)
  - UFC Light Heavyweight Championship (One time)
    - Five successful title defenses
    - Second most championship fights in the Light Heavyweight division (9)
    - Second most championship rounds fought in the Light Heavyweight division (28)
    - Second most successful Light Heavyweight title defenses in UFC history (5)
    - Second most consecutive successful Light Heavyweight title defenses in UFC history (5)
    - Second most wins in UFC Light Heavyweight division championship fights (6)
  - UFC 13 Light Heavyweight Tournament Runner-Up
  - Fight of the Night (Four times) vs. Forrest Griffin 1, Chuck Liddell 2, Rashad Evans 2 and Forrest Griffin 3
  - Knockout of the Night (One time) vs. Ken Shamrock 3
  - Submission of the Night (One time) vs. Ryan Bader
  - UFC Encyclopedia Awards
    - Fight of the Night (Eight times) vs. Guy Mezger 1, Frank Shamrock, Wanderlei Silva, Yuki Kondo, Ken Shamrock 1, Randy Couture, Chuck Liddell 1 and Vitor Belfort
      - Tied (Randy Couture) for most Encyclopedia Fight of the Night Awards (8)
      - Most combined Encyclopedia/Official Fight of the Night Awards in UFC history (12)
    - Knockout of the Night (Two times) vs. Guy Mezger 2 and Evan Tanner
      - Tied (Chuck Liddell) for most Encyclopedia Post-Fight Awards (10)
  - Tied (Ryan Bader) for third most wins in UFC Light Heavyweight division history (15) (including pre-modern era)
  - Most control time in UFC Light Heavyweight division history (1:22:51)
  - Second most top control time in UFC Light Heavyweight division history (1:05:02)
  - Fifth most significant strikes landed in UFC Light Heavyweight division history (1241)
  - UFC.com Awards
    - 2005: Ranked #3 Fight of the Year vs. Vitor Belfort
    - 2006: Ranked #5 Fight of the Year vs. Forrest Griffin 1
    - 2011: Upset of the Year vs. Ryan Bader & Ranked #8 Submission of the Year vs. Ryan Bader
- Wrestling Observer Newsletter
  - 1999 Fight of the Year vs. Frank Shamrock on September 24
- Sherdog
  - Mixed Martial Arts Hall of Fame
- Fighting Spirit Magazine
  - 2006 Fight of the Year vs. Forrest Griffin on April 15
- Fight Matrix
  - 2014 Comeback Fighter Of The Year

=== Professional wrestling ===
- Wrestling Observer Newsletter
  - Worst Gimmick (2013) Aces & Eights

=== Submission grappling ===
- Abu Dhabi Combat Club
  - 2000 ADCC Submission Wrestling World Championships −99 kg bronze medalist

=== Amateur wrestling ===
- California Community College Athletic Association
  - CCCAA State Champion (1995, 1996)
  - CCCAA All-American (1995, 1996)
  - CCCAA All-State Selection (1995, 1996)
- California Interscholastic Federation
  - CIF All-State Selection (1993)

== Mixed martial arts record ==
Professional record breakdown
34 matches	21 wins	12 losses
By knockout	10	5
By submission	5	2
By decision	6	5
Draws	1	

Res.	Record	Opponent	Method	Event	Date	Round	Time	Location	Notes
Win	21–12–1	Alberto El Patrón	Submission (rear-naked choke)	Combate Americas 51: Tito vs. Alberto	December 7, 2019	1	3:10	McAllen, Texas, United States	Catchweight (210 lbs) bout.
Win	20–12–1	Chuck Liddell	KO (punches)	Golden Boy Promotions: Liddell vs. Ortiz 3	November 24, 2018	1	4:24	Inglewood, California, United States	Heavyweight bout.
Win	19–12–1	Chael Sonnen	Submission (rear-naked choke)	Bellator 170	January 21, 2017	1	2:03	Inglewood, California, United States	
Loss	18–12–1	Liam McGeary	Submission (inverted triangle choke)	Bellator 142: Dynamite 1	September 19, 2015	1	4:41	San Jose, California, United States	For the Bellator Light Heavyweight World Championship.
Win	18–11–1	Stephan Bonnar	Decision (split)	Bellator 131	November 15, 2014	3	5:00	San Diego, California, United States	
Win	17–11–1	Alexander Shlemenko	Technical Submission (arm-triangle choke)	Bellator 120	May 17, 2014	1	2:27	Southaven, Mississippi, United States	
Loss	16–11–1	Forrest Griffin	Decision (unanimous)	UFC 148	July 7, 2012	3	5:00	Paradise, Nevada, United States	Fight of the Night.
Loss	16–10–1	Antônio Rogério Nogueira	TKO (punches and elbows to the body)	UFC 140	December 10, 2011	1	3:15	Toronto, Ontario, Canada	
Loss	16–9–1	Rashad Evans	TKO (knee to the body and punches)	UFC 133	August 6, 2011	2	4:48	Philadelphia, Pennsylvania, United States	Fight of the Night.
Win	16–8–1	Ryan Bader	Submission (guillotine choke)	UFC 132	July 2, 2011	1	1:56	Paradise, Nevada, United States	Submission of the Night.
Loss	15–8–1	Matt Hamill	Decision (unanimous)	UFC 121	October 23, 2010	3	5:00	Anaheim, California, United States	
Loss	15–7–1	Forrest Griffin	Decision (split)	UFC 106	November 21, 2009	3	5:00	Paradise, Nevada, United States	
Loss	15–6–1	Lyoto Machida	Decision (unanimous)	UFC 84	May 24, 2008	3	5:00	Paradise, Nevada, United States	
Draw	15–5–1	Rashad Evans	Draw (unanimous)	UFC 73	July 7, 2007	3	5:00	Sacramento, California, United States	Ortiz was deducted one point in round 2 for grabbing the fence.
Loss	15–5	Chuck Liddell	TKO (punches)	UFC 66	December 30, 2006	3	3:59	Paradise, Nevada, United States	For the UFC Light Heavyweight Championship. Fight of the Night.
Win	15–4	Ken Shamrock	TKO (punches)	Ortiz vs. Shamrock 3: The Final Chapter	October 10, 2006	1	2:23	Hollywood, Florida, United States	Knockout of the Night.
Win	14–4	Ken Shamrock	TKO (elbows)	UFC 61	July 8, 2006	1	1:18	Paradise, Nevada, United States	
Win	13–4	Forrest Griffin	Decision (split)	UFC 59	April 15, 2006	3	5:00	Anaheim, California, United States	Fight of the Night.
Win	12–4	Vitor Belfort	Decision (split)	UFC 51	February 5, 2005	3	5:00	Paradise, Nevada, United States	
Win	11–4	Patrick Côté	Decision (unanimous)	UFC 50	October 22, 2004	3	5:00	Atlantic City, New Jersey, United States	
Loss	10–4	Chuck Liddell	KO (punches)	UFC 47	April 2, 2004	2	0:38	Paradise, Nevada, United States	
Loss	10–3	Randy Couture	Decision (unanimous)	UFC 44	September 26, 2003	5	5:00	Paradise, Nevada, United States	Lost the UFC Light Heavyweight Championship.
Win	10–2	Ken Shamrock	TKO (corner stoppage)	UFC 40	November 22, 2002	3	5:00	Paradise, Nevada, United States	Defended the UFC Light Heavyweight Championship.
Win	9–2	Vladimir Matyushenko	Decision (unanimous)	UFC 33	September 28, 2001	5	5:00	Paradise, Nevada, United States	Defended the UFC Light Heavyweight Championship.
Win	8–2	Elvis Sinosic	TKO (punches and elbows)	UFC 32	June 29, 2001	1	3:32	East Rutherford, New Jersey, United States	Defended the UFC Light Heavyweight Championship.
Win	7–2	Evan Tanner	KO (slam)	UFC 30	February 23, 2001	1	0:30	Atlantic City, New Jersey, United States	Defended the UFC Light Heavyweight Championship.
Win	6–2	Yuki Kondo	Submission (neck crank)	UFC 29	December 16, 2000	1	1:52	Tokyo, Japan	Defended the UFC Light Heavyweight Championship.
Win	5–2	Wanderlei Silva	Decision (unanimous)	UFC 25	April 14, 2000	5	5:00	Tokyo, Japan	Won the vacant UFC Light Heavyweight Championship.
Loss	4–2	Frank Shamrock	TKO (submission to punches)	UFC 22	September 24, 1999	4	4:42	Lake Charles, Louisiana, U.S.	For the UFC Light Heavyweight Championship.
Win	4–1	Guy Mezger	TKO (punches)	UFC 19	March 5, 1999	1	9:56	Bay St. Louis, Mississippi, United States	
Win	3–1	Jerry Bohlander	TKO (cut)	UFC 18	January 8, 1999	1	14:31	New Orleans, Louisiana, United States	
Win	2–1	Jeremy Screeton	TKO (submission to knees)	West Coast NHB Championships 1	December 8, 1998	1	0:16	Los Angeles, California, United States	
Loss	1–1	Guy Mezger	Submission (guillotine choke)	UFC 13	May 30, 1997	1	3:00	Augusta, Georgia, United States	UFC 13 Lightweight Tournament final. Ortiz replaced an injured Enson Inoue.
Win	1–0	Wes Albritton	TKO (punches)	UFC 13	May 30, 1997	1	0:31	Augusta, Georgia, United States	UFC Lightweight Tournament alternate bout.

== Pay-per-view bouts ==
No.	Event	Fight	Date	Attendance	PPV Buys
1.	UFC 33	Victory in Vegas	September 28, 2001	9,500	75,000
2.	UFC 40	Vendetta	November 22, 2002	13,265	100,000
3.	UFC 44	Undisputed	September 26, 2003	10,400	94,000
4.	UFC 47	It's On	April 2, 2004	11,437	106,000
5.	UFC 50	The War of '04	October 22, 2004	9,000	40,000
6.	UFC 51	Super Saturday	February 5, 2005	11,072	105,000
7.	UFC 66	Liddell vs. Ortiz	December 30, 2006	13,761	929,000
8.	UFC 106	Ortiz vs. Griffin 2	November 21, 2009	10,529	375,000
9.	UFC 133	Evans vs. Ortiz	August 6, 2011	11,583	310,000
10.	Golden Boy Promotions: Liddell vs. Ortiz 3	Liddell vs. Ortiz 3	November 24, 2018	7,839	40,000
Total PPV Buys:					2,174,000

== Submission grappling record ==
7 Matches, 5 Wins (3 Submission), 2 Loss
Result	Rec.	Opponent	Method	Event	Division	Date	Location
Lose	5–2	(United States) Sean Alvarez	Points (2x0)	ADCC 2000	Absolute	2000	(United Arab Emirates) Abu Dhabi
Win	5–1	(Brazil) Rodrigo Medeiros	Points (2x0)	ADCC 2000	Absolute	2000	(United Arab Emirates) Abu Dhabi
Win	4–1	(Japan) Rumina Sato	Submission (North–south choke)	ADCC 2000	Absolute	2000	(United Arab Emirates) Abu Dhabi
Win	3–1	(United States) Matt Hughes*	Points (2x0)	ADCC 2000	–99 kg	2000	(United Arab Emirates) Abu Dhabi
Lose	2–1	(Brazil) Ricardo Arona	Points (2x0)	ADCC 2000	–99 kg	2000	(United Arab Emirates) Abu Dhabi
Win	2–0	(United States) Mike Van Arsdale	Submission (Heel hook)	ADCC 2000	–99 kg	2000	(United Arab Emirates) Abu Dhabi
Win	1–0	(Ukraine) Rostylav Borysenko	Submission (Arm triangle choke)	ADCC 2000	–99 kg	2000	(United Arab Emirates) Abu Dhabi

- For the bronze medal (3rd place).

== Professional boxing record ==
1 fight	0 wins	1 loss
By knockout	0	1

No.	Result	Record	Opponent	Type	Round, time	Date	Age	Location	Note
1	Loss	0–1	Anderson Silva	KO	1 (8), 1:22	Sep 11, 2021		Seminole Hard Rock Hotel & Casino, Hollywood, Florida, U.S.	

== Bibliography ==
- (2008) This is Gonna Hurt: The Life of a Mixed Martial Arts Champion.

== Filmography ==
=== Film ===
Year	Title	Role	Notes
2003	Cradle 2 the Grave	Cage Fighter	Cameo appearance
2005	The Crow: Wicked Prayer	Famine	Co-Starring
2006	Valley of the Wolves: Iraq	Major U.S. Official	Minor role
2008	Zombie Strippers	Bouncer of the Rhino	Cameo appearance
2017	Boo 2! A Madea Halloween	Victor	Co-Starring
2019	Above the Shadows	Attila	
2019	Trauma Center	Det. Pierce	
2023	Operation Black Ops	Noah	Starring

=== Music videos ===
Year	Title	Role	Artist
1999	Got the Life		Korn
2005	Truth	Uncle Sam	Seether

=== Television ===
Year	Title	Role	Notes
2007	MADtv	Himself	1 episode
2008	The Celebrity Apprentice	Contestant	Eliminated as Empresario project manager in ninth episode
2012	Hell's Kitchen	Himself / Restaurant Patron & Former MMA Champion	Episode: "12 Chefs Compete"
2012	CSI: NY	Derek Petrov	Episode: "Clean Sweep"

=== Video games ===
Year	Title	Role	Notes
2000	Razor Freestyle Scooter	Himself	Playable character
2000	Ultimate Fighting Championship	Himself	Playable character, cover athlete
2002	UFC: Tapout	Himself	Playable character, cover athlete
2002	UFC: Throwdown	Himself	Playable character, cover athlete
2003	UFC: Tapout 2	Himself	Playable character, cover athlete
2004	UFC: Sudden Impact	Himself	Playable character
2009	UFC 2009 Undisputed	Himself	Playable character
2010	UFC 2010 Undisputed	Himself	Playable character
2012	UFC Undisputed 3	Himself	Playable character
2018	EA Sports UFC 3	Himself	Playable character
2020	EA Sports UFC 4	Himself	Playable character
2023	EA Sports UFC 5	Himself	Playable character

== See also ==
- List of Bellator MMA alumni

Vacant Title last held by Frank Shamrock	2nd UFC Light Heavyweight Champion; April 14, 2000 – September 26, 2003	Succeeded by Randy Couture
