= Space Master =

Tabletop science fiction role-playing game

- Cover
- Designers: Kevin Barrett and Terry K. Amthor
- Publishers: Iron Crown Enterprises
- Publication: 1985
- Genres: Science fiction
- Systems: Rolemaster Fantasy Roleplaying system

Space Master is a science fiction role-playing game produced by Iron Crown Enterprises (ICE) in 1985.

== Contents ==
Space Master is a science-fiction space-adventure system, fairly complex, and compatible with Cyberspace, Rolemaster, and to a lesser extent Middle-earth Role Playing.

The first and second editions included the "Future Law" and "Tech Law" book, a booklet of spaceship plans, plus maps and counters for spaceship combat.

The third edition (which the publisher calls the second edition) is revised and expanded, with three new booklets. The "Player Book" (128 pages) covers: character creation (a detailed class-and-level system); a complex and comprehensive combat system; skills and activity resolution; and extensive psionic powers rules. The "GM Book" (80 pages) covers: star system and planet creation; 40 pages of background data on the Empire, a far-future interstellar realm; guidelines for alternate milieus; how to run adventures and create encounters; and information on alien races. The "Tech Book" (96 pages) covers all sorts of futuristic equipment, including weapons, tools, armor, computers, robots, clones and cyborgs, vehicles, and spaceships (including deck plans for nine examples); also includes malfunction and repair rules and detailed charts of weapon effects. The third edition boxed set also includes a two-piece color star map of the Empire.

ICE published several expansions, including Space Master Companion I, Space Master Companion II and Aliens & Artifacts, as well as numerous adventure modules and setting sourcebooks. A cyberpunk adaptation of the system, called Cyberspace was also published, along with a smaller number of supplements.

=== Spacemaster 2 ===
The Space Master System is usable in a variety of SF environments, from a dystopian near-future post-apocalyptic Earth, to a culture of high-tech exploration, to a distant time where civilization has fallen to superstitious ruin. Spacemaster has 17 professions, dozens of sub-professions, over 120 skills and a selection of background options.

Spacemaster Trilogy:

1. Space Master: The Role Playing Game is completely compatible with all Space Master Modules, and is the first part of a Science Fiction Gaming Trilogy.
2. Space Master: Star Strike (Fall 1988), a fast-paced game of interplanetary ship combat, puts you in the gunner’s chair as you face enemy starships.
3. Space Master: Armored Assault (1989), moves the combat planetside, where Hovertanks, Powered Armor, and Aircraft vie for supremacy.

The default setting for Spacemaster 2 is the classic Imperium setting, where a human empire spans the galaxy in a future thousands of years hence.

== Publication history ==
Space Master was designed by Kevin Barrett and Terry K. Amthor, with a cover by Gail McIntosh and illustrations by Jason Waltrip and Dan Carroll, and was published by ICE in 1985 as a boxed set with two books (one 96 pages, one 88 pages), a 16-page pamphlet, three color maps, and a counter sheet.

The second edition was published in 1986. A third edition with a cover by Walter Velez was published in 1988 as a boxed set which included three booklets and two color maps. There was also a second edition reprint in 1992 in a combined softcover book (ISBN 1-55806-172-X ICE2600 #9050).

ICE published their new Spacemaster: Privateers RPG (2000) even while they were in chapter 11. ICE's last remaining role-playing lines - Rolemaster, Spacemaster and Shadow World – and the ICE brand itself were all that was left of the original company by 2001, and John R. Seal of London purchased all of that for $78,000; these rights were placed into the holding company Aurigas Aldebaron LLC, which only held the properties and did not take on any debt. Soon after purchasing the ICE property rights, Aurigas licensed them to Phoenix LLC, a company who wanted to continue production and soon after became Mjolnir LLC and then started doing business using the "ICE" intellectual properties and brand. Mjolnir restarted the Spacemaster: Privateers line, which updated the game mechanics in Spacemaster to be more similar to the mechanics in the Rolemaster Standard System. As problems developed with the ICE brand, Aurigas Aldebaron pulled the ICE-related IP rights from Mjolnir and licensed the High Adventure Role Playing, Rolemaster and Spacemaster rights to Guild Companion Publications.

== Game supplements and adventures ==
- Future Law (1985)
- Tech Law (1985)
- Action on Akaisha Outstation (1985)
- Imperial Crisis: House Devon in Turmoil (1986)
- Lost Telepaths: The Secret of House Kashmere (1986)
- Beyond the Core: The Worlds of Frontier Zone Five (1987)
- The Cygnus Conspiracy (1987)
- Space Master Companion (1987)
- League of Merchants (1988)
- Space Master Combat Screen (1988)
- Tales from Deep Space: Perils on the Imperial Frontier (1988)
- War on a Distant Moon: The Tayan Revolution (1988)
- The Durandrium Find: Salvation for House Augustus-Hayes (1989)
- Raiders from the Frontier: House Jade-London Besieged (1989)
- Star Strike (1989)
- Vessel Compendium #1: Adventurer Class (1989)
- Vessel Compendium #2: Pursuit Class (1989)

== Reception ==
Dave Nalle, writing in Abyss, called this "a rather nicely produced package ... The print is clear and readable, the charts are well-organized and there are some excellent technical illos [illustrations]." Nalle did not like the art, finding that it ranged "from adequate to awful." Regarding the actual contents, Nalle thought the process of setting up a character background was "sketchy ... it doesn't really provide enough detail or guidelines." Nalle liked the weapon rules, calling them "probably the best and most original material in the game", but found the combat rules "overcomplicated ... Combat is certainly realistic, but it passes the line where it is an aid to play and seriously hinders the flow of the game." Nalle concluded, "On the whole, Space Master is a good effort ... The combat system is cumbersome in the I.C.E. tradition, but the rest of the game works fairly well."

The Games Machine reviewed Space Master - The Roleplaying Game and stated that "Not everyone will like Space Master. The rules make few concessions to ease of learning, and players without experience of other roles will have a really tough time. But as a detailed, flexible, science-fiction system it has a lot to commend it."

In his 1990 book The Complete Guide to Role-Playing Games, game critic Rick Swan noted "With page after page of tables, charts, and numbers, Space Master is the most demanding outer space RPG ever published ... The character creation and combat systems alone take up most of the 128-page Player Book." In a more positive light, Swan found "excellent, detailed systems for planet creation, robots, psionics, and the most comprehensive equipment catalog for science-fiction gaming I've ever seen." Swan concluded by giving the game a rating of 2.5 out of 4, saying, "Be warned, however, that there's no such thing as a casual player of Space Master — this is science fiction for accountants."

== Other reviews ==
- Casus Belli #48
