= Dark arts =

Dark arts or dark art may refer to:

- Magic (supernatural), beliefs and actions employed to influence supernatural beings and forces
  - "Arcane magic" (or "esoteric magic"), magic kept in the dark, secret magic, magic hidden from the public eye
  - Black magic (or "dark magic"), the use of supernatural powers for evil and selfish purposes
- Dark Arts (album), a 2016 album by The Killers bassist Mark Stoermer
- Dark Arts (Harry Potter), practiced in J. K. Rowling's Harry Potter novels
- "Dark Art", a song by Zach Hill from his 2008 album Astrological Straits
- "Dark Art", a song by Greek band Septicflesh from the 2017 album Codex Omega

== See also ==
- Black art (disambiguation)
- Dark magic (disambiguation)
