= Campaign Law =

Tabletop role-playing game supplement

Campaign Law is a 1984 role-playing game supplement published by Iron Crown Enterprises for Rolemaster.

== Contents ==
Campaign Law is a supplement presenting the original campaign guidelines for Rolemaster, with information on how to prepare and run a role-playing campaign and contains the adventure scenario "World of Vog Mur".

== Publication history ==
Campaign Law was written by Peter C. Fenlon and John David Ruemmler, with a cover by Dean Morrisey, and was published by Iron Crown Enterprises in 1984 as a 56-page book.

According to Shannon Appelcline, ICE decided to give Rolemaster a setting again with the publication of the fifth core book, Campaign Law (1984), which "described how to run an entire campaign — making it one of the earliest GM guidebooks on the markets. Campaign Law got Rolemaster its setting back by reintroducing the setting of Loremaster through three new islands collectively called 'The World of Vog Mur.'"

== Reviews ==
- Dragon #88 (Aug., 1984)
