= Black Magic (disambiguation) =

Black magic refers to evil supernatural magic.

Black magic may also refer to:

== Film and television ==
- Black Magic (1929 film), directed by George B. Seitz
- Black Magic (1944 film), a Charlie Chan film
- Black Magic (1949 film) (aka Cagliostro), directed by Gregory Ratoff and starring Orson Welles
- Black Magic (1975 film), a Hong Kong film
- Black Magic (1987 film), a Filipino comedy film starring Dolphy
- Black Magic (1992 film), starring Rachel Ward and Judge Reinhold
- Black Magic (2019 film), starring Kelly Brook
- "Black Magic" (Rising Damp), a 1974 television episode

== Comics and games ==
- Black Magic (comics), a horror anthology begun in 1950
- Black Magic (video game), a 1987 computer game by Datasoft
- Black Magic (manga), a 1983 manga series written by Masamune Shirow, with an OVA made in 1987

== Books ==
- Black Magic (book), a 1928 travel book by Paul Morand
- The Black Magician (novel series), by Trudi Canavan

== Products ==
- Black Magic (chocolates), a packaged chocolate assortment manufactured by Nestlé
- Blackmagic Design, a manufacturer of professional video equipment
- Black magic (programming), computer science jargon for arcane programming techniques

== Transport ==
- Black Magic (yacht), NZL 32, the winning yacht in the 1995 America's Cup regatta, sailing for New Zealand
- Black Magic, a de Havilland DH.88 Comet aircraft

== Music ==
=== Albums ===
- Black Magic (Magic Sam album), 1968
- Black Magic (Martha Reeves and the Vandellas album), 1972
- Black Magic (Jimmy Cliff album), 2004
- Black Magic (Royale Lynn album), 2025
- Black Magic (Swollen Members album), or the title track, 2006
- Black Magic (Yemi Alade album), 2017

=== Songs ===
- "Black Magic" (Little Mix song), 2015
- "Black Magic" (Baker Boy song), 2018
- "Black Magic" (Eminem song), 2020
- "Black Magic" (Jonasu song), 2020
- "Black Magic", by Beach House, from the EP Become
- "Black Magic", by Slayer from Show No Mercy
- "Black Magic", by Dan the Banjo Man, 1974
- "Black Magic", by Magic Wands, 2008
- "Black Magic", short name of "That Old Black Magic", a 1942 popular song

=== Artists ===
- Blackmagic (musician), a Nigerian rapper, singer, and songwriter

== See also ==
- Blacke's Magic, a 1986 American crime drama
- "Black Magic Woman", a 1968 song by Peter Green
- Dark magic (disambiguation)
- Black art (disambiguation)
- White magic (disambiguation)
