= Vessel Compendium 1: Adventurer Class =

Vessel Compendium 1: Adventurer Class is a 1989 role-playing game supplement for Space Master published by Iron Crown Enterprises.

== Contents ==
Vessel Compendium 1: Adventurer Class is a supplement in which a wide variety of civilian craft are detailed.

== Publication history ==
Vessel Compendium 1: Adventurer Class was written by Tony Van Liew, with a cover by Walter Velez, and illustrations by Jason Waltrip, and was published by Iron Crown Enterprises in 1989 as a 64-page book with a sheet of cardboard counters.

== Reception ==
Steve G Jones reviewed Vessel Compendium 1: Adventurer Class for Games International magazine, and gave it 3 stars out of 5, and stated that "For SpaceMaster, Adventurer Class is more useful with its ship designs, while Pursuit Class has better scenarios."
