= Arcane Companion =

Role-playing game supplement

Arcane Companion is a fantasy role-playing game supplement published by Iron Crown Enterprises (ICE) in 1995 for the Rolemaster system.

== Publication history ==
In 1995, ICE released an update to Rolemaster called Rolemaster Standard System. As ICE had done with previous editions, they also published several supplementary rulebooks, Arcane Companion being one of them. The 128-page softcover book was designed by Todd McGovern and John Curtis, with cover illustration by Angus McBride, and was released in 1995.

== Contents ==
Arcane Companion sets out extended rules for magic in the Rolemaster universe. Spellcasters must specialize in magic from one of three categories: Essence, Channeling, and Mentalism. The book details

- new spellcaster classes: Arcanist, Wizard, Chaotic, and Magehunter
- the various energy systems that gamemasters can choose for their campaign, be it Ley Lines, Essence Flows or Earthnodes.
- how players can use temporary Bladerunes to enhance weapons
- how spellcasters can create artificial life
- some of the issues for spellcasters who abuse the powers of magic
- almost a thousand spell descriptions

== Reception ==
In the July 1996 edition of Dragon (Issue 231), Rick Swan warned that the Rolemaster system was a mathematician's delight: "Saturated with charts and numbers, it's for players who buy pocket calculators by the crate... If you're the kind of guy who needs his fingers to do arithmetic, this ain't your kind of game." Despite this, Swan found Arcane Companion to be "not only comprehensible, but entertaining, thanks to the designers’ efforts to infuse the facts and figures with vivid imagery." Swan concluded that because this supplement was so solidly linked to the Rolemaster system, it could not be ported to another game system, but "experienced players should welcome this ambitious expansion with open arms. And if you’re among those who’ve dismissed Rolemaster as not worth the effort, sneak a peek at Arcane Companion; it might tempt you to reconsider."
