= Supplementary =

The term supplementary can refer to:

- Supplementary angles
- Supplementary Benefit, a former benefit payable in the United Kingdom
- Supplementary question, a type of question asked during a questioning time for prime minister

== See also ==
- Supplement (disambiguation)
