= Robin Hood the Role Playing Campaign =

Role-playing game supplement

Cover art by Angus McBride

Robin Hood the Role Playing Campaign is a supplement published by Iron Crown Enterprises (I.C.E.) in 1987 that can be used with either the role-playing game systems Rolemaster or Hero System.

== Description ==
Robin Hood the Role Playing Campaign provides the necessary background for role-playing in the Nottinghamshire area in medieval England, and allows the players to take on the roles of Robin Hood and his Merry Men. The background material includes some English history from the time of The Conquest, life in Norman England, religion, magic and folklore, geography, towns, villages and castles, and notable personalities.

The book also contains five short adventures:

1. Deliver De Lacy
2. Corvain's Plea
3. The Lance of Light
4. Perchance to Dream
5. The Boar

Game statistics are included for both the Hero System and Rolemaster.

== Publication history ==
In the mid-1980s, I.C.E. had developed its own Rolemaster role-playing system, but after largely taking over the operations of Hero Games, also found itself publishing material for the Hero System. The Campaign Classics series contained statistics for both systems. In the 2014 book Designers & Dragson: The '80s, game historian hannon Appelcline noted that "ICE's fourth new product lines had ties to both Hero and Rolemaster. Their "Campaign Classics" books detailed historic and mythic backgrounds in excellent one-off sourcebooks that were dual-statted for both systems. There were five in all: Robin Hood (1987), Mythic Greece (1988), Vikings (1989), Pirates (1989), and Mythic Egypt (1990)."

This did cause some issues both within and outside of I.C.E. As Appelcline explained, "Though well-regarded and generally lauded, the Campaign Classics line also highlighted how poor the Hero/ICE fit was. Fans, freelance authors, and even in-house authors for ICE wanted little to do with Hero, and vice-versa. Monte Cook, for a time the editor in charge of both lines, would later recount having to deal with complaints from fans — who all felt like space was being wasted in their books with stats they'd never used — on a daily basis."

Robin Hood the Role Playing Campaign was part of this dual-statted line, a 160-page softcover book written by Graham Staplehurst, with illustrations by Denis Loubet, cartography by Ellisa Martin-Schob and David Martin, and cover art by Angus McBride.

== Reception ==
Ken Rolston reviewed Robin Hood the Role Playing Campaign for White Dwarf #92, and stated that "it does have some excellent, well-developed campaign ideas and adventures. It's [sic] greatest value would be as a sourcebook for Pendragon campaigns."

Rolston also authored a review in the October 1987 edition of Dragon (Issue # 126), noting that although "the medieval part is all right [...] it's not particularly exciting to those used to fantasy adventuring with lots of magic and monsters and evil sorcerers and stuff." He concluded "Game masters running fantasy or historical campaigns with a strong, medieval English flavor should find this a useful sourcebook, but Robin Hood doesn't present a very convincing setting for a role-playing campaign."

== Other reviews ==
- Alarums & Excursions, Issue 142 (June 1987, p. 88)
- Abyss, Issue 41 (Winter 1987, p. 4)
- Games Review Vol. 1, Issue 4 (January 1989, p. 20)
