= Operation Black Ops =

- Directed by: Jamaal Burden
- Written by: Jamaal Burden
- Starring: Tito Ortiz; Chris Cyborg; Rafael Cansino
- Release date: 2023
- Country: United States

Operation Black Ops is a 2023 American film written and directed by Jamaal Burden, starring Tito Ortiz, Chris Cyborg, and Rafael Cansino. The script involves the recruitment of mercenaries by the government to infiltrate a German-speaking Neo-Nazi stronghold in Texas, only to discover they're holding nuclear codes to launch World War Three.

== Reception ==
Reviews of Operation Black Ops were mixed. Jim Morazzini of Nerdly gave the film 1.5 out of 5, criticizing its plot, effects, action sequences and ending. Bulletproof Action was also critical of the film, particularly its effects, sound and action scenes. Lee B. Golden III of Film Combat Syndicate similarly criticized the film's story, action and visual effects. In contrast, Loron Hays of ReelReviews gave the film 3 out of 5 stars, finding it entertaining while noting shortcomings in its character development.
