= Black Ops (Rolemaster) =

Black Ops is a 1997 role-playing game supplement published by Iron Crown Enterprises for Rolemaster.

== Contents ==
Black Ops is a supplement in which a modern espionage setting explores a gritty world of covert operations filled with political intrigue, subterfuge, and lethal consequences. It offers detailed rules changes for espionage gameplay, including new character professions, skills, and training packages. It delivers new weapon tables—flamethrowers, grenades, rocket launchers, and demolition charges—alongside an extensive gear list ranging from specialized ammo to spy gadgets and pharmaceuticals. It features meticulous research on global intelligence services and terrorist organizations.

== Publication history ==
Shannon Appelcline noted that after they released the Rolemaster Standard Rules in 1995, "ICE tried to duplicate their old formula for success. Named companions collected coherent sets of rules, from the Arcane Companion (1995) to the Mentalism Companion (1998). New RMSS genre books expanded the system to totally new settings, including Black Ops (1997) and Pulp Adventures (1997)."

== Reception ==
Gary O'Connell reviewed Black Ops for Arcane magazine, rating it a 5 out of 10 overall, and stated that "Where the book excels is on its exhaustive analysis of the world’s security agencies from MI5 to Mossad and the terrorist organisations from ETA to the IRA that take up so much of their time since the Cold War ended. It is a shame Black Ops content and few uninspiring scenarios fail to express the excitement and drama of playing a Spy."
