= Rolemaster =

Tabletop role-playing game

Rolemaster.
- The current logo for the Rolemaster game system, used since 2003.
- Designers: Coleman Charlton, John Curtis, Pete Fenlon, Steve Marvin
- Publishers: Iron Crown Enterprises
- Publication: 1980 (1st edition); 1984 (2nd edition); 1995 (3rd edition); 1999 (4th edition); 2022 (5th edition)
- Genres: Fantasy
- Systems: Rolemaster Standard System

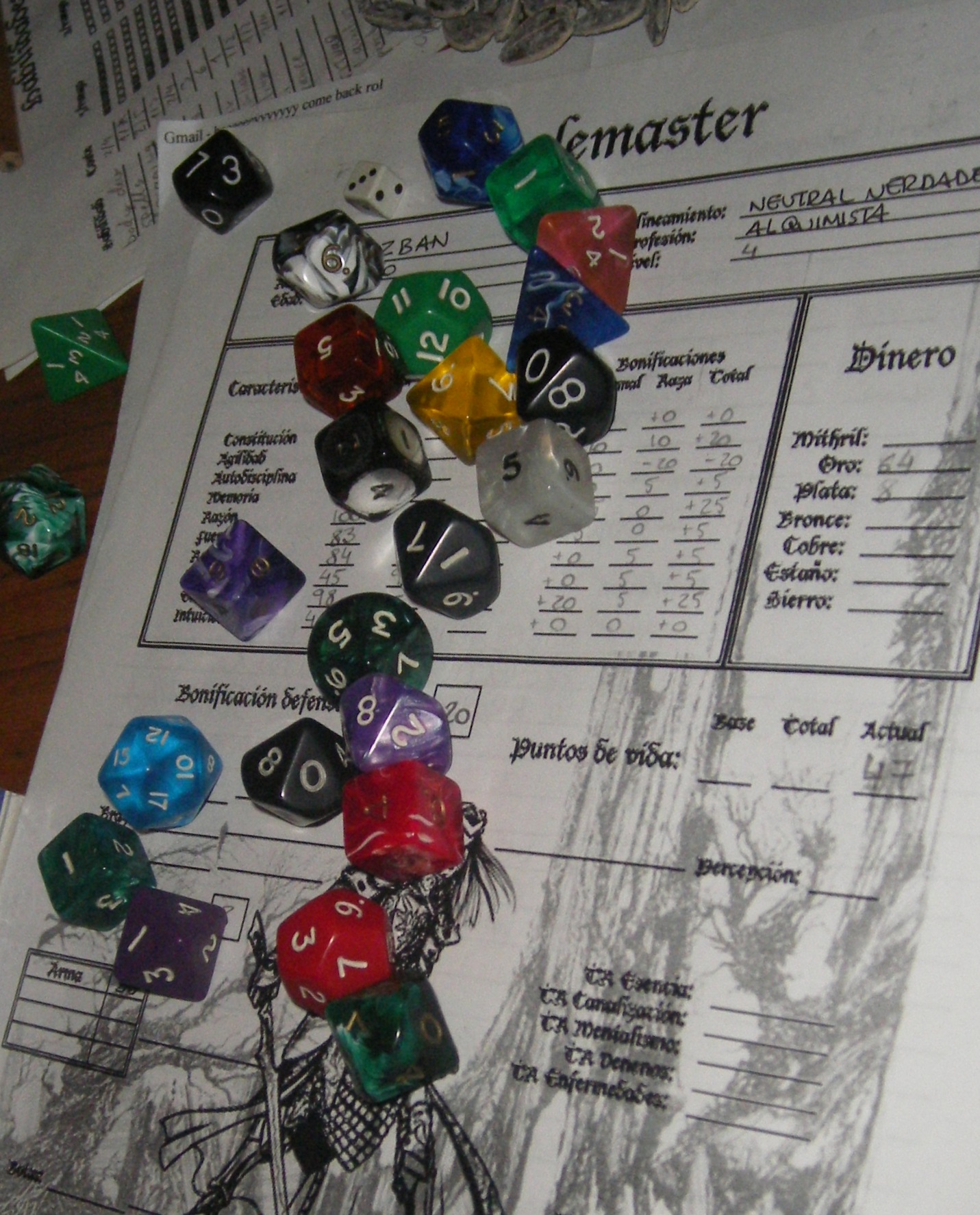
Rolemaster role-playing game character sheet and dice

Rolemaster (originally Role Master) is a fantasy tabletop role-playing game published by Iron Crown Enterprises in 1980. The game system has undergone several revisions and editions since then.

== Description ==
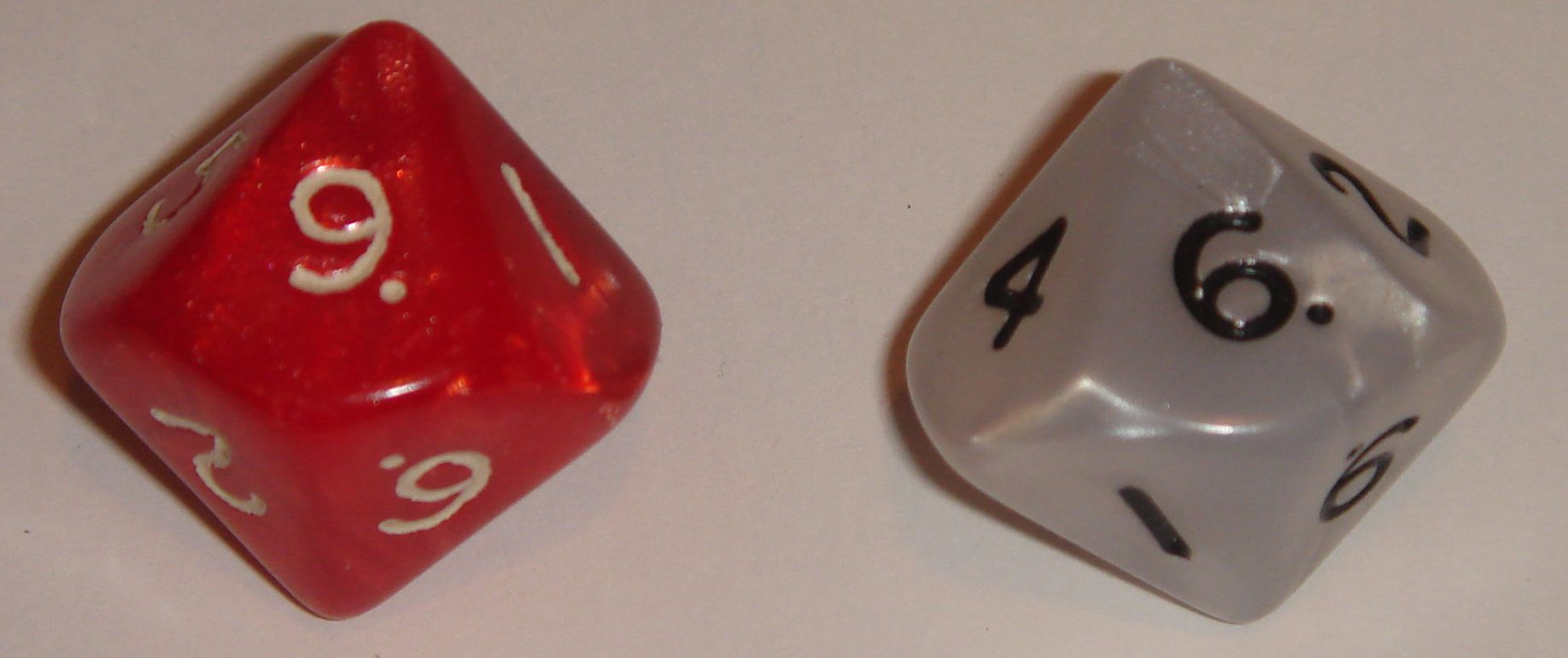
Rolemaster uses two ten-sided dice

Rolemaster is a fantasy role-playing game system that has been characterized as highly complex, with a large number of charts and tables to be consulted for every action.

=== Character creation and development ===
Rolemaster characters have ten attributes such as physical strength, memory, self-discipline, and agility with scores between 1 and 100. These scores can be determined either through a point-buy system or randomly. Each attribute is then used to derive relevant skill bonuses.

Skills are purchased in Ranks; the more ranks a character has in a skill, the more able they are at actions covered by that skill.

=== Task resolution ===
When a player wishes to attempt an action, the player rolls percentile dice, applies relevant modifiers, and looks the result up on the appropriate chart to determine the result.

=== Combat ===
An attacking combatant rolls percentile dice, adds their Offensive Bonus to the total, adds modifiers, and subtracts the defender's Defensive Bonus. The total is then applied to a table for the attacker's weapon. The attack total is cross-indexed with the type of armor (if any) worn by the defender and the result will be a number of concussion hits dealt, which are then subtracted from the defender's running total. If sufficient hits are dealt, the defender may become unconscious.

In addition to concussion hits, some dice rolls will result in a critical hit, which can vary in type and severity. The system of tables details what part of the body has been damaged, describing, as one reviewer noted, "various horrific wounds in graphic detail."

== Publication history ==
Rolemaster has had several editions, with three lines currently maintained in parallel.

=== First edition (RM1): 1980–1982 ===
The original Rolemaster grew out of house rules developed by Pete Fenlon, S. Coleman Charlton, and Kurt Fischer during a Middle-earth-set Dungeons & Dragons campaign at the University of Virginia in the late 1970s. After graduating in 1980, the group founded Iron Crown Enterprises to publish the rules. The first edition consists of five books: Arms Law (1980), Spell Law (1981), Claw Law (1982), Character Law (1982), and Campaign Law (1984), initially marketed as modular add-ons for Advanced Dungeons & Dragons before being bundled as a standalone system.

=== Second edition (RM2): 1984–1994 ===
In 1984, an initial boxed set was issued containing both expanded and revised rules. The box included Spell Law, a combined Arms Law & Claw Law, a combined Character Law and Campaign Law, and the Vog Mur campaign module for the Loremaster setting.

Shortly after the first box, a new boxed set was released, containing all of the previous contents as well as The Cloudlords of Tanara, a setting and adventure supplement. The supplement introduced ICE's original Loremaster setting, which later developed into Shadow World.

Several additional supplementary books were published individually for the second edition, including three Creatures & Treasures books, and a series of companion books that expanded the core rules.

=== Rolemaster Standard System: 1995 ===
In 1995 the game was revised and re-released as Rolemaster Standard System (RMSS). The most significant changes were to character generation, particularly the number of skills available and the method for calculating skill bonuses. Many supplementary rulebooks and accessories were subsequently published.

=== Rolemaster Fantasy Role Playing: 1999 ===
In 1999 the game underwent a restructuring when Rolemaster Fantasy Role Playing (RMFRP) was released; the revision was largely a rearrangement of material, with few changes to the underlying rules. The previously single-volume Spell Law was divided into three books — Of Essence, Of Channelling, and Of Mentalism — each of which expanded that realm of power with additional professions and spell lists.

=== Rolemaster Unified: 2022 ===
Rolemaster Unified (RMU) was released in December 2022 following an extended public beta. The edition draws on elements of the previous RMC, RMSS, and RMFRP rulesets and was issued in a multi-volume format consisting of Core Law, Spell Law, Creature Law, and Treasure Law.

=== Variant systems ===
Iron Crown Enterprises went out of business in 2000, and in 2001 the intellectual rights to Rolemaster were sold to the London-based company Aurigas Aldebaron, while the ICE brand name was licensed to a U.S.-based company named Mjolnir LLC. In 2016, the license was transferred to Guild Companion Publications, with whom Aurigas Aldebaron merged. From 2017, the merged company changed its name to Iron Crown Enterprises, returning to the original publisher name.

After the original books went out of print, the new owners issued several reprints, resulting in three variants of the original Rolemaster game system that remain in distribution.

In 1995, the boxed set Rolemaster: The Basics was issued as a simplified version of the Rolemaster Standard System. The box contains rulebooks with all rules necessary for playing this simplified variant of the game.

In 2007, the second edition (RM2) rules were revitalized and issued as Rolemaster Classic (RMC). The reissue was published by Guild Companion Publications and included new versions of the core rulebooks Arms Law, Spell Law, Character Law, and Creatures and Treasures, along with an updated Rolemaster Companion and a new Combat Companion in 2008.

Also in 2007, Rolemaster Express (RMX) was issued by Guild Companion Publications as a simplified single-volume version of the Rolemaster Classic rules.

== Reception ==
Ronald Pehr reviewed Rolemaster for Fantasy Gamer magazine and stated that "As an experienced gamer, I admire Rolemaster, appreciate the work that went into it, and could learn to enjoy playing it more often. If you've got a campaign world and want a fascinating set of rules to bring that world to life, Rolemaster is going to appeal to you. If you're not currently involved in fantasy role-playing — and don't have a lot of money to spend on it — Rolemaster is not for you."

In Issue 18 of the Australian wargaming magazine Queensland Wargamer, Kevin Flynn commented, "For those looking for something different, this is an ideal investment ... Rolemaster has adopted probably the best elements of all the existing [fantasy role-playing games] into a single system." However, Flynn noted "This is not worth buying unless you're going to buy the whole system." Flynn also pointed out that the system was "Tedious at times much too many tables and modifiers to look at or think about." But he did think that it was "a very stimulating package for the veteran player." Flynn concluded, "On the whole, the game system is excellent. It is NOT easily adopted into other game systems ... If you can buy it then buy the lot and go from there."

In the August 1984 edition of Dragon (Issue #88), Arlen Walker queried whether the hefty $48 price tag for the second edition boxed set was worth the money, and provided a long and in-depth examination of the box's contents. Walker had quibbles over the combat system, which seemed to generalize rather than individualize weapons; and he felt the book on animal encounters had very little information about the actual animals. Walker concluded, "Is the Rolemaster system worth the $48, then? The answer is a resounding 'maybe.' If you want a freer, more open game than you are currently playing, I'd say it is probably worth it. Even with the inconsistencies noted it still allows more freedom of choice than almost any other game. Although the physical size of the game is rather imposing, the actual mechanics run rather smoothly and simply."

Walker also reviewed the separately published books Character Law, Campaign Law, Spell Law, Claw Law and Arms Law.

- Character Law Although Walker liked the ability to move randomly generated ability scores around to produce the most beneficial results for the character class sought, he disagreed with the system of rolling dice ten times in order to generate character abilities, and then raising two of those abilities up to 90, if they were not already 90 or better. Walker felt this created a monochrome cast of characters and non-player characters. Walker liked the different ways that characters could gain experience points, such as travel, having religious experiences such as visions, and for coming up with a brilliant idea — although he thought this one would probably lead to arguments over which player had originally voiced the germ of the idea. But he didn't like the idea that characters get experience points for dying.
- Spell Law Walker was impressed with the variety of spells detailed in Spell Law, numbering over two thousand. He found that the "spell-casting system is somewhat more complicated than in other games, but not unplayably so."
- Arms Law He had quibbles about Arms Law — combat was very fast and lethal due to the high amount of damage inflicted by a single blow, and he believed that new players used to other role-playing systems should be made aware of this. Walker also questioned why a character could not parry with a two-handed weapon, although he realized it was probably "a concession to speed of play."
- Claw Law Walker criticized the lack of descriptions of the animals covered in Claw Law, saying, "The animal descriptions have little if anything to do with animals. Calling them descriptions, in fact, is probably overstating the case dramatically... We are told nothing else about the animal, including what it looks like, where it can be found, and how it will behave if found." Walker went on to question why "Historical Weapons" were found in this book, which was supposed to be about damage from animals and monsters, rather than in Arms Law. He also criticized the lack of variety these weapons represented, since to calculate damage and other combat-related numbers for these exotic weapons, referees were simply referred to equivalent weapons in Arms Law. "For example, if you wish to have your character use a Katana, you use the same chart as if he were using a broadsword. The cover blurbs (for Arms Law) say, 'Because a mace is not an arrow or a scimitar...' yet this section says a broadsword is both a long sword and a sabre (as well as a Katana) and a dart is a dagger, because they use the same tables."
- Campaign Law Unlike the first four books, Walker had high praise for Campaign Law, saying, "Whether you're looking for a new system to run or not, Campaign Law is definitely worth the $10 price of admission. The information and guidelines this book will give you on fleshing out and filling in a consistent campaign world are almost invaluable. All I can say is that if this book had been available when I first began running campaigns, it would have saved me at least a year of development time."

In Issue 29 of Abyss, Eric Olson recommended the Rolemaster line of products, but cautioned that they might be hard to adapt to an existing campaign since their approach was so different to most game systems. Olson concluded, "It might not be the ideal system for you, but it is an interesting change. ICE is on the rise, and has built a solid base, and I am more and more impressed with them with each new product."

Troy Christensen reviewed Rolemaster for Different Worlds magazine and stated that "I found ICE's game lacking the special magic which distinguishes a good game from the bad. I found it just to be another high-priced game with tiring, overused rules. I cannot recommend this game to any serious role-player, I can suggest that it might be worth your while to purchase 'Spell Law' if you are interested in gaining new spells for your present role-playing game."

Rick Swan reviewed various editions of the game system:

- In his 1990 book The Complete Guide to Role-Playing Games, Swan thought that the second edition game system "reads more like a collection of supplements than an integrated system ... it's still extraordinarily complicated and by no means for beginners." Swan concluded by giving the game a rating of 2.5 out of 4, saying, "Rolemaster lacks the flavor of classic fantasy RPGs such as Advanced Dungeons & Dragons and RuneQuest, coming off as a dull collection of numbers and tables."
- In the September 1995 edition of Dragon (Issue 221), Swan reviewed the updated 144-page Arms Law book that had been released in conjunction with the revised Rolemaster Standard System edition. Swan still found the complexity of the Rolemaster system astounding, saying, "With its tidal wave of numbers, formulas, and tables, the Rolemaster game always struck me as the kind of fantasy RPG that calculus professors play on their day off." Swan found Arms Law to be "mainly a book of tables — more than 100 pages worth." He gave the book an average rating of 4 out of 6, and recommended it only for the mathematically inclined: "If you read computer manuals for fun, if you get misty-eyed thinking about your high school algebra class, if you wonder why your friends complain about something as trivial as filling out tax forms, then Rolemaster ought to be right up your alley. Arms Law is as good a place as any to begin your investigation."
- In the July 1996 edition of Dragon (Issue 231), Swan reviewed the new supplement Arcane Companion that had been published in conjunction with the revision of the magic system in the Rolemaster Standard System edition. Swan reiterated that the Rolemaster system was a mathematician's delight: "Saturated with charts and numbers, it's for players who buy pocket calculators by the crate... If you're the kind of guy who needs his fingers to do arithmetic, this ain't your kind of game." Despite this, Swan found Arcane Companion to be "not only comprehensible, but entertaining, thanks to the designers' efforts to infuse the facts and figures with vivid imagery." Swan concluded that because this supplement was so solidly linked to the Rolemaster system, it could not be ported to another game system, but "experienced players should welcome this ambitious expansion with open arms. And if you're among those who've dismissed Rolemaster as not worth the effort, sneak a peek at Arcane Companion; it might tempt you to reconsider."

In a 1996 reader poll conducted by UK games magazine Arcane to determine the 50 best roleplaying systems, Rolemaster was ranked 15th. Arcane editor Paul Pettengale commented: "Often used as an archetypal example of a complex roleplaying system, Rolemaster is a fairly numbers-heavy game that also relies on the use of a lot of tables. Most notable are its notorious 'critical hit' charts, which are subdivided by damage type and describe various horrific wounds in graphic detail. If you're looking for a highly detailed and fairly complex system, Rolemaster has a great deal to recommend it. The rules are fairly well organised and very flexible, easily adaptable to a wide variety of situations. On the other hand, if you're not one for tables and calculations, it's probably not going to ring your bell."

Scott Taylor for Black Gate in 2013 rated Rolemaster as #6 in the top ten role-playing games of all time, saying "Also attributed to the frame of the Middle-Earth Role-Playing Game, which was the 2nd most popular fantasy RPG of the 1980s, I.C.E.'s Rolemaster must certainly make a showing as something of a heavyweight in the industry, even if it no longer exists as an entity".

== Other reviews and commentary ==
- Dosdediez (Número 2 - Ene/Feb 1994)
- Jeux & Stratégie nouvelle formule #5

== Publications ==
These are some of the many publications connected with the five editions of the Rolemaster game.

Rolemaster first edition

- Arms Law (1980)
- Character Law (1982)
- Claw Law (1982)
- Spell Law (1982)
- Arms Law / Claw Law - boxed set (1982)

Loremaster

- The Iron Wind (1980)

Rolemaster second edition

- Arms Law & Claw Law (1984, 1989)
- Spell Law (1984, 1989)
- Campaign Law (1984)
- Character Law & Campaign Law (1985, 1989)
- Creatures & Treasures (1985)
- Rolemaster Companion (1986)
- Rolemaster Combat Screen (1986)
- Rolemaster Companion II (1987)
- Rolemaster Companion III (1988)
- Elemental Companion (1989)
- Creatures & Treasures II (1989)
- Rolemaster Companion IV (1990)
- Rolemaster Character Records (1990)
- Rolemaster Heroes and Rogues (1991)
- Rolemaster Companion V (1991)
- Spell User's Companion (1991)
- War Law - boxed set (1992)
- Alchemy Companion (1992)
- Rolemaster Companion VI (1992)
- Arms Companion (1993)
- Rolemaster Companion VII (1993)
- Creatures & Treasures III (1993)
- Sea Law (1994)

Shadow World

- The Cloudlords of Tanara (1984)
- The Shade of the Sinking Plain (1984)
- The World of Vog Mur (1984)
- Cyclops Vale (1989)
- Demons of the Burning Night (1989)
- Islands of the Oracle (1989)
- Jaiman, Land of Twilight (1989)
- Journey to the Magic Isle (1989)
- Kingdom of the Desert Jewel (1989)
- The Ogrillion Horror (1989)
- Quellbourne: Land of the Silver Mist (1989)
- Shadow World Master Atlas (1989)
- Star Crown Empire and the Sea of Fates (1989)
- Tales of the Loremasters (1989)
- Tales of the Loremasters II (1989)
- Emer and Master Atlas Addendum (1990)
- Nomads of the Nine Nations (1990)
- Norek: Intrigue in a City-State of Jaiman (1990)
- Sky Giants of the Brass Stair (1990)

Genre Supplements

- Robin Hood: A Giant Outlaw Campaign (1987)
- Mythic Greece: The Age of Heroes (1988)
- Vikings (1989)
- Pirates (1990)
- Mythic Egypt (1990)
- Dark Space (1990)
- Outlaw (1991)
- Time Riders (1992)
- Oriental Companion (1992)
- At Rapier's Point (1993)
- Arabian Nights (1994)

Rolemaster Standard System

- Arms Law (1994)
- Spell Law (1995)
- Creatures & Monsters (1995)
- Gamemaster Law (1995)
- Rolemaster Standard Rules (1995)
- Player Guide (1995)
- Arcane Companion (1996)
- Treasure Companion (1996)
- Races & Cultures: Underground Races (1996)
- Castles & Ruins (1996)
- Talent Law (1996)
- Weapon Law - Firearms (1996)
- Martial Arts Companion (1997)
- Essence Companion (1997)
- Channeling Companion (1998)
- Mentalism Companion (1998)
- ...and a 10-Foot Pole (1999)
- 10 Million Ways To Die (1999)

Shadow World

- Curse of Kabis (1995)

Generic

- Black Ops (1997)
- Shades of Darkness (1997)
- Pulp Adventures (1997)
- Run Out the Guns! Adventure Kit (1998)
- Nightmares of Mine (1999)

Rolemaster Fantasy Role Playing

- Arms Law (1999)
- Character Law (1999)
- Spell Law: Of Essence (1999)
- Spell Law: Of Channeling (1999)
- Spell Law: Of Mentalism (1999)
- Gamemaster Law (1999)
- Creatures & Monsters (1999)
- Rolemaster Fantasy Role Playing (1999)
- Treasure Companion (2000)
- School of Hard Knocks - The Skill Companion (2000)
- Channeling Companion (2000)
- Fire & Ice: The Elemental Companion (2002)
- The Armory (2002)
- Mentalism Companion (2003)
- Construct Companion (2003)
- Races and Cultures (2004)

Shadow World

- Shadow World Master Atlas (2001)

Aernth

- City of Archendurn (2002)
- Dún Crú (2009)

The Echoes of Heaven

- The Echoes of Heaven Campaign Setting (2006)
- The Last Free City (2006)
- On Corrupted Ground (2007)
- Bestiary (2007)
- In His Name (2014)
- The Day Before Apocalypse (2014)

Rolemaster Unified

- Core Law (2022)
- Spell Law (2022)
- Creature Law I (2022)
- Treasure Law (2022)

=== Supplementary publications ===
Several publications and magazines with supplementary game material have been issued under the ICE brand over the years.

For the Rolemaster Standard System, Rolemaster Annual 1996 and Rolemaster Annual 1997 included additional rules for that game system, including new professions, races, spell lists, and errata.

For the Rolemaster Fantasy Role Playing system, Guild Companion Publications (GCP) issued Rolemaster Quarterly from April 2006 to August 2007. The magazine was dedicated to presenting optional rules and play material, and a total of seven magazines were published.

Several Electronic Roleplaying Assistants (ERAs) have been issued for use with the RMC, RMSS and RMFRP systems since 2005. They are computer applications, developed for use with Windows, Mac OSX and Linux, helping players and game masters running the game digitally, including character creation and management.

== See also ==
- Shadow World (role playing game)
- High Adventure Role Playing (HARP)
- Space Master
- Middle-earth Role Playing
- Lord of the Rings Adventure Game
