= Claw Law =

Supplementary publication for fantasy RPG Rolemaster

Claw Law is a supplement published by Iron Crown Enterprises in 1982 for the fantasy role-playing game Rolemaster.

== Contents ==
Claw Law is a supplement to Arms Law with 12 new tables for attack forms including bite, talon, and sting.

Shannon Appelcline explains that "Claw Law (1982) extended Rolemaster's combat rules to beasts."

== Reception ==
In the October 1982 edition of The Space Gamer (No. 56), Richard Wolfe, Jr. was ambivalent about the book, saying, "If you own Arms Law and like it, this is for you. If you are pleased with the combat system you use now, or you don't like the idea of killer rabbits, you can live without it."

Ronald Pehr reviewed Claw Law for Fantasy Gamer magazine and stated that "Claw Law is a vital part of the system, since it includes the only data in Rolemaster on animals and monsters. Its heritage, as a game supplement rather than part of a game, shows up here. Players are presumed to be familiar with, say, what sort of Undead would correspond to 'Class I.' That's nice, if you're playing another game which Claw Law supplements — not so nice if you're playing Rolemaster alone."

In the August 1984 edition of Dragon (Issue #88), Arlen Walker criticized the lack of descriptions of the animals covered in Claw Law, saying, "The animal descriptions have little if anything to do with animals. Calling them descriptions, in fact, is probably overstating the case dramatically... We are told nothing else about the animal, including what it looks like, where it can be found, and how it will behave if found."
