= Supplement =

Supplement or Supplemental may refer to:

== Health and medicine ==
- Bodybuilding supplement
- Dietary supplement
- Herbal supplement

== Media ==
- Supplement (publishing), a publication that has a role secondary to that of another preceding or concurrent publication
- Supplement (album), by Ai Nonaka
- The Supplement, a 2002 Polish film
- In literary theory, an idea of Jacques Derrida from Of Grammatology
- Supplement, a role-playing or tabletop game expansion pack

== Other uses ==
- Supplement, one of a pair of supplementary angles, considered relative to the other

== See also ==
- Supplementary (disambiguation)
- Supply (disambiguation)
