= Arms Law =

Role-playing game supplement

Arms Law is a supplement published by Iron Crown Enterprises in 1980 for the fantasy role-playing game Rolemaster.

== Contents ==
Arms Law is a combat system initially designed for melee combat in fantasy role-playing games, utilizing only percentile dice.

In summary, each character has an Offensive Bonus (OB), which takes into account one's natural physical adeptness, weapon skill, and other factors, and a Defensive Bonus (DB), which takes into account natural agility, the use of shields and "Adrenal Defense", the ability of martial artists to avoid blows seemingly without effort. In addition various modifiers for position, wounds, and other factors are present. An attacking combatant rolls percentile dice, adds his or her OB to the total, adds modifiers, and subtracts the defender's DB. The total is then applied to a table for the attacker's weapon. The attack total is cross-indexed with the type of armor (if any) worn by the defender and the result will be a number of concussion hits dealt, which are then subtracted from the defender's running total. If sufficient hits are dealt, the defender may go unconscious, but death seldom results purely from concussion hit damage.

In addition to concussion hits, however, a critical hit can be dealt by the result on the weapon table. These are described by type (slash, crush, puncture, etc.) and by severity (generally A through E, with E being the most severe). Critical Hits (or simply "crits"), can inflict additional concussion hits, bleeding (subtracted from concussion hits at the start of each new round), broken bones, loss of limbs or extremities, internal organ damage and outright death. If a crit is inflicted, a second roll is made on the appropriate critical table.

== Publication history ==
- 1st edition (1980)
- 2nd edition, as part of Rolemaster boxed set (1984)
- As part of revised Rolemaster Standard System (1995)
- As part of revised Rolemaster Fantasy Roleplaying (1999)

== Reception ==
In the November 1980 edition of The Space Gamer (Issue No. 33), Jerry Epperson liked Arms Law, saying, "I recommend this book to anyone who likes to tinker with game systems."

Eric Goldberg reviewed Arms Law in Ares Magazine #11 and commented that "Arms Law claims to be a step forward in the field of realistic medieval combat. It documents the differences of specific weapons versus specific types of armor, but there are enough minor errors to keep it well shy of perfection."

Ronald Pehr reviewed Arms Law for Fantasy Gamer magazine and stated that "Arms Law works, and provides intriguing combats, if you are willing to flip through charts, if you can easily read small print, and — most importantly — if you can fill in the holes. These holes are the gamemaster's option in choosing new modifiers to the die rolls. This can be nice if you're adding Arms Law to an existing game, but not so nice if you're using Rolemaster as an independent system."

In the August 1984 edition of Dragon (Issue #88), Arlen Walker had quibbles about Arms Law — combat was very fast and lethal due to the high amount of damage inflicted by a single blow, and he believed that new players used to other role-playing systems should be made aware of this. Walker also questioned why a character could not parry with a two-handed weapon, although he realized it was probably "a concession to speed of play."

Eleven years later, in the September 1995 edition of Dragon (Issue 221), Rick Swan reviewed the updated 144-page Arms Law book that had been released in conjunction with the revised Rolemaster Standard System edition. Swan found the complexity of the Rolemaster system astounding, saying, "With its tidal wave of numbers, formulas, and tables, the Rolemaster game always struck me as the kind of fantasy RPG that calculus professors play on their day off." Swan found Arms Law to be "mainly a book of tables — more than 100 pages worth." He gave the book an average rating of 4 out of 6, and recommended it only for the mathematically inclined: "If you read computer manuals for fun, if you get misty-eyed thinking about your high school algebra class, if you wonder why your friends complain about something as trivial as filling out tax forms, then Rolemaster ought to be right up your alley. Arms Law is as good a place as any to begin your investigation."

== Reviews ==
- Australian Realms #21
