= Mike Pondsmith =

American game designer

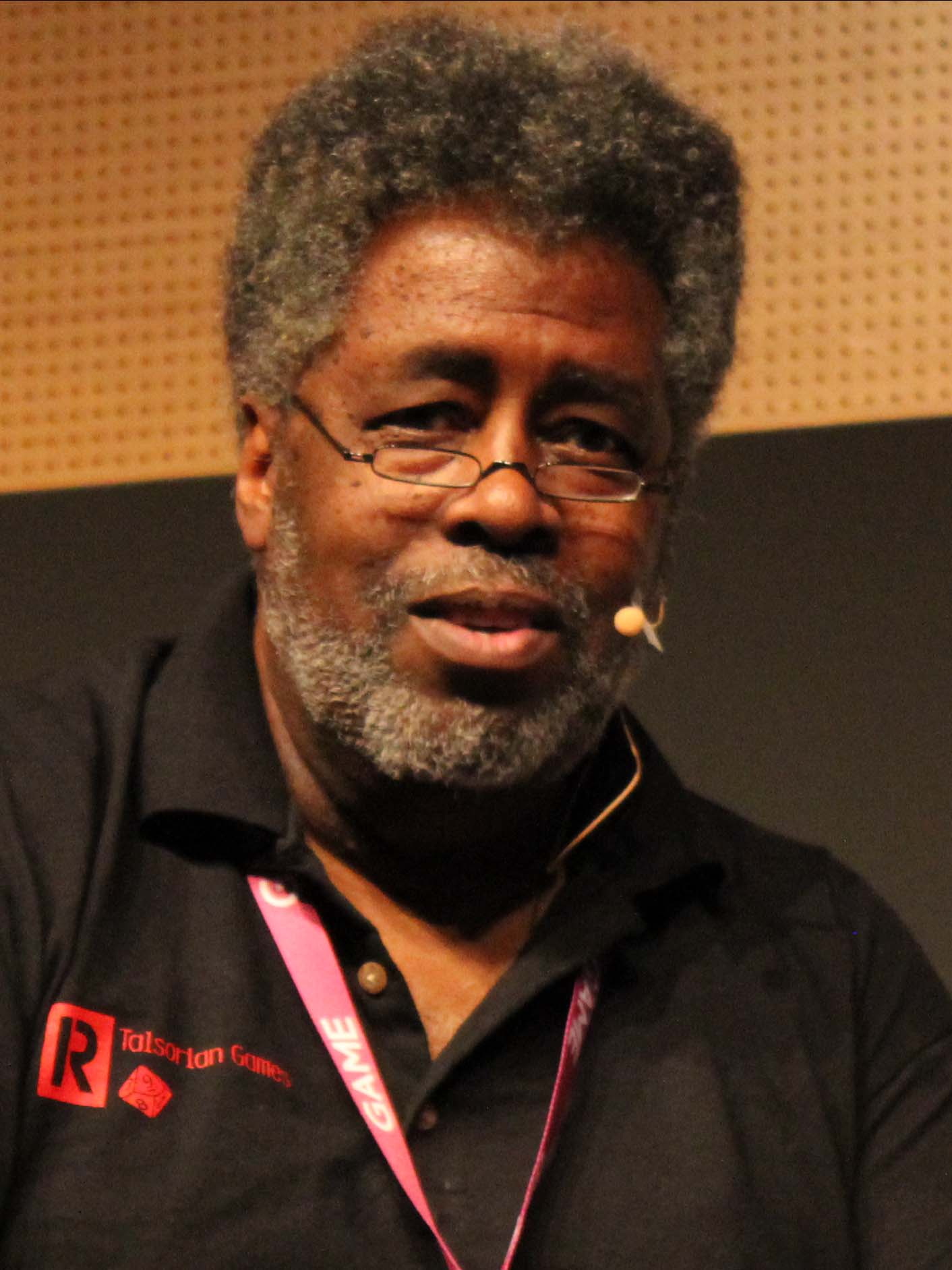
- Pondsmith in 2017
- Born: Michael Alyn Pondsmith; Santa Cruz, California, U.S.
- Education: University of California, Davis (BA, BS)
- Occupations: Entrepreneur, game designer, graphic designer, writer, teacher
- Notable work: Mekton, Teenagers from Outer Space, Cyberpunk, Castle Falkenstein
- Spouse: Lisa Pondsmith
- Children: 2
- Awards: 2006 Origins Awards Hall of Fame; 1994 Origins Awards Best Roleplaying Rules for Castle Falkenstein

Michael Alyn Pondsmith is an American roleplaying, board, and video game designer. He founded the publisher R. Talsorian Games in 1982, where he developed a majority of the company's role-playing game lines. Pondsmith is the author of several RPG lines, including Mekton (1984), Cyberpunk (1988) and Castle Falkenstein (1994). He also contributed to the Forgotten Realms and Oriental Adventures lines of the Dungeons & Dragons role-playing game, worked in various capacities on video games, and authored or co-created several board games. Pondsmith also worked as an instructor at the DigiPen Institute of Technology.

== Early life and education ==
Born into a military family, Mike Pondsmith was the son of a psychologist and an Air Force officer, who traveled around the world with the United States Air Force for the first 18 years of his life. He graduated from the University of California, Davis with a Bachelor of Arts major in graphic design and a Bachelor of Science major in behavioral psychology.

Pondsmith recalls that he had been designing games even as a child, but it was not until college that he was introduced to the idea of pen and paper roleplaying games when a friend got a copy of the original Dungeons & Dragons (D&D). He has said that originally he had wanted to be a special effects designer and stumbled into table top games "by dumb luck." Pondsmith has said that his first introduction to Dungeons and Dragons was via its predecessor, Chainmail.

Having a lot of naval wargaming experience, Pondsmith became interested in the gameplay mechanics used by D&D but not in the fantasy setting it presented. His interest spiked, however, when he acquired a copy of Traveller, a science fiction role-playing game published in 1977 by Game Designers' Workshop. Dissatisfied with its mechanics, Pondsmith rewrote the game for his personal use under the name Imperial Star. Pondsmith later called Traveller the best roleplaying game he had encountered in the Green Ronin's award-winning Hobby Games: The 100 Best.

== Career ==
=== Early career: graphic design work and Mekton ===
Before he became a pen and paper game designer, Pondsmith worked in the video game industry as a graphic designer. His first job after college involved designing packaging and advertising materials for the now-defunct California Pacific Computer Company (CPCC). Repackaging Japanese games for the Western world market was the main focus of CPCC in its early days. He later moved on to create designs for the original titles produced by Bill Budge and for the early Ultima games designed by Richard Garriott, all of which were published by CPCC. Pondsmith's job at CPCC ended because of problems the owner encountered, and he started managing a typesetting house at the University of California, Santa Cruz. Pondsmith got his start in amateur game design in the early 1980s, designing a game for himself called Imperial Star as a result of trying to improve the combat system of Traveller.

According to Pondsmith, there was not much to do in the area of video game design in the early 1980s due largely to the constraints of available technology. Most of the games released by CPCC were for Apple II machines. However, he was familiar with pen and paper games, which he played at the time, and became interested in paper game design. Thanks to his side-job in typesetting, he had access to very modern (for the time) computers with advanced software used in book and magazine layout. Taking advantage of this access, he wrote a game called Mekton, a mecha game based on Japanese manga books he had stumbled upon in the past. Pondsmith admitted that he was mostly basing his work on the Mobile Suit Gundam manga written in Japanese, which he had acquired. Not understanding the text, he inaccurately recreated the world dynamics purely from the imagery of the comic books. The game's first public testing occurred at a local convention. The initial public release of Mekton focused on its battle mechanics with no roleplaying elements at all; this made it a pure tactical war-game.

Due to the interest his work on paper games generated, game design consumed his graphic design career (although he continued designing and laying out most of the R. Talsorian Games' books).

=== Late 1980s: founding of R. Talsorian Games ===
The success of Mekton proved to Pondsmith that he could make a living out of game design, and he founded the roleplaying game publishing company R. Talsorian Games (RTG) in California in 1985. It was one of the first RPG publishers to embrace desktop publishing. Lisa Pondsmith, Mike Pondsmith's wife, serves as a general manager of the company, with Mike Pondsmith remaining the owner, CEO and lead designer. Regarding the source of the name of the company, Pondsmith has stated that "R. Talsorian is a real person who never plays RPGs", one of the company's investors, a "raisin farmer in Fresno." A fellow game designer, Warren Spector, advised him to avoid naming his company after himself; Pondsmith and his associates heeded that advice by naming their company after "the one person who would never show up at a convention ever," Talsorian.

In 1986, Mekton was re-released as a proper roleplaying game with Pondsmith and Mike Jones credited as authors. In 1987, RTG released another of Pondsmith's games inspired by Japanese manga, Teenagers from Outer Space, (RPGA Gamer's Choice Award). In 1987, Pondsmith released Mekton II, a new edition of the system, featuring mechanics based on the Interlock System, later used with slight modifications in the Cyberpunk line. Teenagers from Outer Space was re-released with significant changes to the mechanics in 1989. Games such as Cyberpunk (later Cyberpunk 2020) and Cyberpunk V3 were translated into 9 languages. Castle Falkenstein (Best Game of 1994), Cybergeneration, and Dream Park soon followed. He also collaborated with the Hero Games designers on the Fuzion system.

R. Talsorian Games released Pondsmith's board game GoDice! in 2006. The initial release of Mekton is also considered to be a board game.

==== Work for TSR games ====
Pondsmith was briefly associated with TSR, Inc., where he worked on Buck Rogers XXVC, a science-fiction RPG, and two sourcebooks for the Dungeons & Dragons: Kara-Tur: The Eastern Realms for Oriental Adventures in 1988 and Hall of Heroes for Forgotten Realms in 1989. He also made minor, uncredited contributions to the original Star Wars: The Roleplaying Game released in 1987 by West End Games. In 1990, during his time with TSR, Pondsmith co-designed three, two-player board games for the publisher.

- Attack in the Asteroids with Paul Lidberg and Kim Mohan
- Battle for the Sprawls with Paul Lidberg
- Craters of Tharsis with Paul Lidberg

Pondsmith has also been president of the Game Manufacturers Association (GAMA), and in his role of GAMA President in 1993, he arbitrated an out-of-court settlement between Palladium Books and Wizards of the Coast over Wizards' use of Palladium system integration notes in The Primal Order.

=== 1988-1998: first Cyberpunk game and Castle Falkenstein ===
==== Cyberpunk roleplaying game ====
In 1988 R.Talsorian Games released Mike Pondsmith's Cyberpunk: The Roleplaying Game of the Dark Future. Set in the year 2013 (and often referred to as Cyberpunk 2013), the game was a boxed product consisting of three separate books penned by Pondsmith, with Mike Blum, Colin Fisk, Dave Friedland, Will Moss and Scott Ruggels as co-authors. Several expansions by Pondsmith and other authors followed and Pondsmith released Cyberpunk 2020, a handbook with an updated story arc and mechanics, (although existing expansions remained compatible with the new game) in 1990.

Pondsmith designed Cyberpunk 2013 as the second game to use the Interlock system. Pondsmith attributes creation of Cyberpunk to his interest in the genre sparked primarily by Ridley Scott's Blade Runner released in 1982. The motivation behind the Cyberpunk roleplaying game was his desire to recreate the technology and dark, film noir style of the movie. Cyberpunk is the most expansive line of products in the RTG library with forty-four sourcebooks containing over 4,700 pages. The game has had an estimated 5 million players to date.

In 1989, West End Games released a Cyberpunk and Paranoia crossover. The game, called Alice Through the Mirrorshades, was designed by Edward Bolme and is compatible with both Cyberpunk and Paranoia games. At least two fan magazines were created around the time of Cyberpunk's peak popularity with Pondsmith's approval: Interface Magazine, which evolved from the unofficial Cyberpunk Update run by Chris Hockabout, and UK-published 'Punk '21.

In 1993, again under the RTG banner, Pondsmith released an alternate timeline for the Cyberpunk line. The sourcebook titled Cybergeneration was further enhanced by additional expansions and a second edition was released in 1995, that built further upon existing, explored themes. A license for the line was later acquired by Jonathan Lavallee, owner of Firestorm Ink, founded specifically to continue RTG's CyberGeneration product line in 2003.

In 1996, Wizards of the Coast licensed Cyberpunk for their collectible card game Netrunner. Designed by Richard Garfield, Netrunner featured locations, entities, and characters familiar to Cyberpunk 2020 players. The game was named one of The Millennium's Most Underrated Games in 1999 in Pyramid magazine published by the Steve Jackson Games. Mike Pondsmith is featured in the game's credits in the 'special thanks' section and makes a cameo appearance as "Omni Kismet, Ph.D." (character's name is an anagram of his). On May 10, 2012, Fantasy Flight Games announced that they would be releasing Android: Netrunner, a new card game based on Netrunner, under license from Wizards of the Coast. Another short-lived card game based on Pondsmith's IP was Cyberpunk CCG, designed by Peter Wacks, and published by Social Games in 2003.

===== Maximum Mike =====
Mike Pondsmith uses his alter-ego "Maximum Mike" across many of the Cyberpunk books. Unlike reoccurring characters like Morgan Blackhand, Johnny Silverhand or Nomad Santiago, Maximum Mike breaks the fourth wall and talks to the reader directly. Pondsmith's likeness and name, however, were used directly in the Cyberpunk world under a different name; he is featured as "Omni Kismet, Ph.D.", one of the characters in the Netrunner CCG (character's name is an anagram of "Mike Pondsmith").

==== Castle Falkenstein ====
In 1994, R. Talsorian Games released Pondsmith's steampunk-themed fantasy role-playing game titled Castle Falkenstein. The game's mechanics were based on playing cards, instead of dice, and geared towards live action role-playing. Castle Falkenstein remains Pondsmith's most critically acclaimed game to date with the 1994 Origins Award for Best Roleplaying Rules, and the 1995 Nigel D. Findley Memorial Award for Best Role-Playing Product recognitions. In 2000, Castle Falkenstein was adapted to the GURPS system by James Cambias and Phil Masters, and released by Steve Jackson Games.

=== 1998-present: video game design and further Cyberpunk work ===
After encountering challenges in the role-playing game industry, on February 15, 1998, Pondsmith announced that R. Talsorian would only operate part-time. Putting the major game lines on hiatus at this time meant doing the same with Hero Games products, and in September 1998, Hero Games announced their separation from R. Talsorian Games. Late in the year 2000, Pondsmith accepted a job offer at Microsoft to produce games for Xbox. As a design manager at Microsoft, he contributed to various games (mostly to the lineup of the original Xbox console's exclusive titles) released by the company's Microsoft Game Studios. In MechCommander 2, released in 2001, he played the role of Steel, a character featured in cut-scenes (he also voiced the character for the in-game chatter between characters). He was also credited in Stormfront Studios' Blood Wake released in the same year. The last Microsoft title he was credited with was Crimson Skies: High Road to Revenge (2003). In 2004 he left Microsoft to join Monolith Productions where he worked on The Matrix Online (2005). During his time at Microsoft, his wife Lisa Pondsmith kept R. Talsorian in business with limited publications.

The idea of a Matrix game was initially pitched internally at Microsoft by Pondsmith and one of his coworkers. Despite advanced talks with the Wachowskis, the film's producers, the project never came to fruition. Pitches to Shiny Entertainment did not succeed either and he later learned that a Matrix game was being worked on at Monolith. Given the opportunity to join the live team (responsible for maintaining the game and producing content post-launch) he decided to join Monolith. Pondsmith ended up doing mission design for the game under Online Creative Director and Lead Game Designer Toby Ragaini.

==== Cyberpunk v3.0 ====
In 2000 Pondsmith announced that he was working on the third edition of Cyberpunk. The work itself started even earlier, right after the release of the Dragon Ball Z Adventure Game in 1999; and the third edition of Cyberpunk was expected to ship soon afterwards. Initially called Cyberpunk 203X, the game was scheduled for a release in the spring of 2001. The first two-page preview of the game was released on August 20, 2001, marking the first pushback of the game's release date. During the prolonged development of the game, Pondsmith released another preview of the third edition of Cyberpunk on December 31, 2004. The game's early manuscript was previewed, and the first public playtesting took place during I-Con in Ronkonkoma, New York between April 8 and 10, 2005. The game was written by Pondsmith, Mike Blum, Colin Fisk, Dave Friedland, Will Moss, and Scott Ruggels and was finally released on December 13, 2005, to mixed reviews.

Illustrations in the game were criticized, for being photographs of slightly modified action figures of which Pondsmith was a collector at the time. The game was successful enough, however, to justify several accessories and supplements which were announced immediately after the core book's release. This included DataPack (initially called Dossier Pak), FlashPak, Gangbook and AltCult Insider. Cyberpunk v3.0, much like its predecessors, was influenced by the classic cyberpunk books written by Neal Stephenson and William Gibson, but also incorporated ideas from new literary sources, Japanese animation, and movies. According to Pondsmith, it was designed to become a commentary on the 21st century, corporate influences on everyday life, ideologies of groups, the place of government, warfare and advancements in biotechnology.

===== Interlock and Fuzion system =====
In addition to working at RTG, Pondsmith contributed to the Hero Games' Champions line. Working mostly as an editorial assistant on books such as Alliances for the Champions: New Millennium, he was introduced to the Hero Games' mechanics (Hero System) which he later decided to merge with the Interlock System used by most of the RTG's games up to that point. The end result of this process was the Fuzion system used by the later RTG titles, most notably the third edition of the Cyberpunk game. In the foreword to the third edition of Cyberpunk, Pondsmith justified these changes as necessary for streamlining the game, and attracting new players. But like the game itself these were met with mixed reviews. Pondsmith holds the rights to Fuzion jointly with Steve Peterson and Ray Greer of Hero Games.

==== Cyberpunk 2077 ====
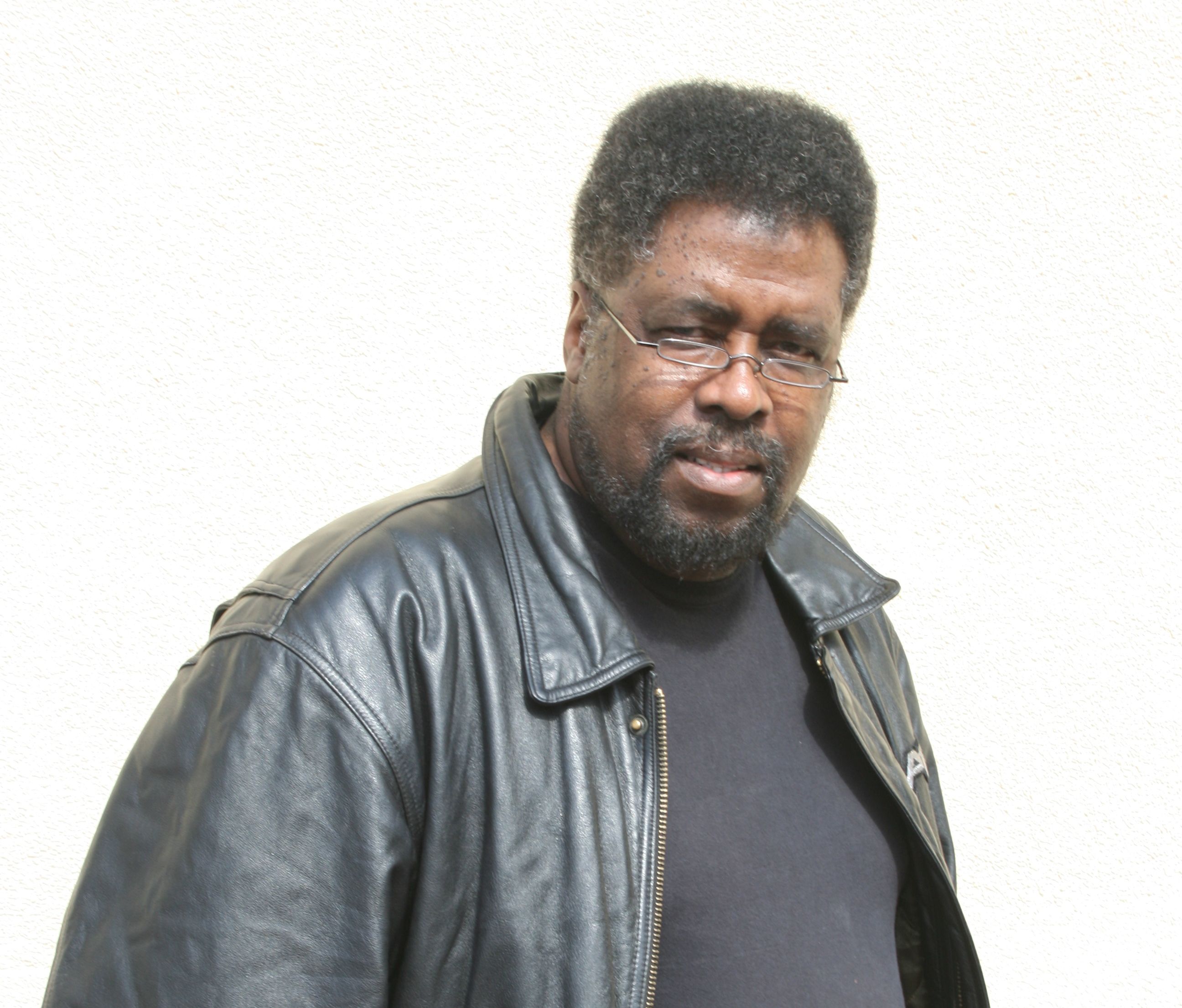
Pondsmith in 2012

On May 30, 2012, it was confirmed that Pondsmith was working with CD Projekt Red on a video game set in the Cyberpunk universe. On October 18, 2012, the game's name and settings were revealed to be Cyberpunk 2077. Immediately afterwards, Brian Crecente was able to confirm with the game's creators that Pondsmith was also working on a new edition of Cyberpunk pen and paper RPG game that would evolve the genre.

In an interview for GameSpot, CD Projekt's Marcin Iwiński divulged that Pondsmith's involvement in the video game development mostly focuses on the game world aspect and mechanics, and his input, though constant, does not happen on a daily basis due to the distance between the parties. Video game creators as well as Mike Pondsmith and other RTG designers will contribute on the newly formed cyberpunk.net blog.

Mike Pondsmith also voices two characters in Cyberpunk 2077, one of them being Maximum Mike the DJ of Morro Rock Radio, a continuation of his persona from the Cyberpunk sourcebooks.

== Personal life ==
Pondsmith has a wife, Lisa, son, Cody, and daughter, Dolan. Lisa and Cody both work at RTG, while Dolan is a graphic artist. He met Lisa "in a roleplaying group while wearing mirror shades, an army jacket and a nine-inch knife." Although Mike and Lisa had met earlier, their relationship began around 1977 while both were still in college. They were married in February 1982. Lisa serves as a general manager of RTG and has been credited in various titles, most notably as author alongside Jeff Grubb of The Memoirs of Auberon of Faerie sourcebook for the Castle Falkenstein system. Cody is credited as a member of the production staff in the Cyberpunk V3.0 supplement Flashpak, and was also involved in the promotion and community communications relating to Castle Falkenstein. Before designing games, Mike Pondsmith worked as an amateur paleontologist. In his spare time he collects plastic GI Joe action figures, prominently featured in the Cyberpunk v3.0 core rulebook, and enjoys outdoor activities, reading, as well as playing around with radio-controlled cars and planes.

=== Public appearances ===
Pondsmith has been very active in gaming communities and has appeared at many gaming conventions over the years. He was present at many of the Gen Cons which led to his memories of his experiences to be featured in Robin D. Laws' 40 Years of Gen Con published in August 2007 by Atlas Games. He attended I-CON, A-Kon, Norwescon, Origins, DexCon, DunDraCon and others. Pondsmith was a guest of honor at Ropecon 1999, Astronomicon 2001 and I-CON 25 (March 24–26, 2006). Both Mike and his son Cody run various games during different gaming conventions. Pondsmith also appeared on stage to talk about the Cyberpunk 2077 video game during two of CD Projekt Red's conferences.

=== Academic career ===
Between the years 2010 and 2011 Pondsmith worked in the Department of Game Software Design and Production at the DigiPen Institute of Technology in Redmond, where he taught game design classes. The two courses he taught were Game History (GAT 110) and Game Mechanics I (GAT 210).

== Awards and recognition ==
Various games designed or co-created by Mike Pondsmith received awards over the years.

- Teenagers from Outer Space received the RPGA Gamer's Choice Award.
- Castle Falkenstein received the Best Roleplaying Rules of 1994 Origins Award.
- Castle Falkenstein received the 1995 Nigel D. Findley Memorial Award for the Best Role-Playing Product.
- Six Guns and Sorcery for Castle Falkenstein written by Edward Bolme, James Cambias, Eric Floch, Angela Hyatt, Jim Parks, Derek Quintanar, Barrie Rosen, Mark Schumann, and Chris Williams received the Best Roleplaying Supplement of 1996 Origins Award.
- Teenagers from Outer Space received the Best Other Category Role-Playing Game of 1987 Origins Gamer's Choice Award.
- Cyberpunk received the Best Science-Fiction Role-Playing Game of 1989 Origins Gamer's Choice Award.
- Kara-Tur: The Eastern Realms written by Jay Batista, Deborah Christian, John Nephew, Mike Pondsmith, and Rick Swan received the Best Role-Playing Accessory of 1989 Origins Gamer's Choice Award.

On July 1, 2006, he was inducted into the Origins Awards Hall of fame, along with Jolly R. Blackburn, Rodger MacGowan, Dennis Mize (posthumously), Aaron Allston, and the game Star Fleet Battles.

On September 12, 2020, Pondsmith was presented with the Jerry Lawson Lifetime Achievement Award at the fourth annual Black in Gaming awards.

== Bibliography ==
Mike Pondsmith worked on or contributed to various R. Talsorian Games' and TSR's products over the years and wrote several articles in gaming magazines.

For R. Talsorian Games:

Title	Year	Co-creator	Description	ISBN
Mekton	1984		Boxed set, purely a board game	
Mekton: the Game of Japanese Robot Combat	1985	Mike Jones		
Roadstriker (Mekton)	1986	Clive Hendrik, Derek Quintanar		ISBN 0-937279-00-5
Advanced Combat System	1986			ISBN 0-937279-02-1
Mekton II	1987			ISBN 0-937279-04-8
Teenagers from Outer Space	1987			ISBN 0-937279-08-0
Cyberpunk: The Roleplaying Game of the Dark Future (also known as Cyberpunk 2013)	1988		Boxed set contains: View from the Edge, Friday Night Firefight and Welcome to Night City	
Solo of Fortune (Cyberpunk 2013)	1989	Colin Fisk, David Friedland, Will Moss, Derek Quintanar, and Scott Ruggels		ISBN 0-937279-06-4
Rockerboy (Cyberpunk 2013)	1989	David Ackerman, Colin Fisk, Will Moss, Scott Ruggels, Sam Shirley, and Glenn Wildermuth		ISBN 0-937279-10-2
Near Orbit (Cyberpunk 2013)	1989	Dave Ackerman, Glenn Wildermuth		ISBN 0-937279-08-0
Teenagers from Outer Space: 2nd Edition	1989			ISBN 0-937279-08-0
Roadstriker II (Mekton II)	1990	Clive Hendrik, Derek Quintanar		ISBN 0-937279-14-5
Cyberpunk 2020	1990	Mike Blum, Colin Fisk, Dave Friedland, Will Moss, Scott Ruggels		ISBN 0-937279-13-7
Night City (Cyberpunk)	1991	Edward Bolme, Colin Fisk, Mike MacDonald, Will Moss, Lisa Pondsmith, Sam Shirley, John Smith, and Anders Swensen		ISBN 0-937279-11-0
Chromebook (Cyberpunk)	1991	Colin Fisk, Dave Harmer, Mike Masarati, Derek Quintanar, Mike Rotor, John Smith, Kevin Stein, William Tracy, Karl Wu, Andrew Strassmann, Ben Wright, Jeff Hexter, Glenn Goddard, and Marcus Pregent		ISBN 0-937279-17-X
Home of the Brave (Cyberpunk)	1992	credited as contributor with main authors being Edward Bolme, Michael MacDonald, Craig Sheeley, and Ross "Spyke" Winn		ISBN 0-937279-36-6
Chromebook 2 (Cyberpunk)	1992	Ben Wright, Mike Roler, Jeff Hexter, Marcus Pregent, Craig Sheeley, Mike MacDonald, Ross Winn, Colin Tipton, and Michael Todd		ISBN 0-937279-29-3
Dream Park Role Playing Game	1992			ISBN 0-937279-27-7
Operation: Rimfire (Mekton II)	1993	additional material with main author being Michael MacDonald		ISBN 0-937279-37-4
CyberGeneration	1993	David Ackerman, Edward Bolme, Karl Wu		ISBN 0-937294-04-7
Bastille Day (CyberGeneration)	1993	David Ackerman, Edward Bolme		ISBN 0-937279-41-2
Star Riders (TFOS2)	1993	with Hans Guévin		ISBN 2-921573-10-5
MediaFront (Cyberpunk)	1994	credited for design with authors being David Ackerman, Edward Bolme, Eric Heisserer, Will Moss, and Justin Schmid		ISBN 0-937279-52-8
Listen Up, You Primitive Screwheads!!!! (Cyberpunk)	1994	Eric Heisserer, Craig Neeley, Mike Roter, Ross Winn, Charlie Wong, and Benjamin Wright		ISBN 0-937279-45-5
Eco Front (CyberGeneration)	1994	credited for design with authors being David Ackerman and Edward Bolme		ISBN 0-937279-50-1
Castle Falkenstein	1994			ISBN 0-937279-44-7
Neo Tribes (Cyberpunk)	1995	credited for guidance with authors being Eric Oppen and Ross Winn		ISBN 0-937279-72-2
CyberGeneration Evolve or Die Revolution 2	1995	David Ackerman, Edward Bolme, and Karl Wu		ISBN 0-937279-74-9
Mekton Z	1995	Mike MacDonald		ISBN 0-937279-54-4
Mekton Z Plus	1995	contributor with main authors being Michael MacDonald and Benjamin Wright		ISBN 0-937279-60-9
The Lost Notebooks of Leonardo da Vinci (Castle Falkenstein)	1995	Edward Bolme and Mark Schumann		ISBN 0-937279-68-4
Comme Il Faut (Castle Falkenstein)	1995	Hilary Ayers, Gilbert Milner, Barrie Rosen and Ross "Spyke" Winn		ISBN 0-937279-55-2
The Book of Sigils (Castle Falkenstein)	1995	Edward Bolme, Michael MacDonald, and Mark Schumann		ISBN 0-937279-61-7
Steam Age (Castle Falkenstein)	1995	David Ackerman, Paul A. Lidberg, Derek Quintanar, Barrie Rosen, Mark Schumann, and Chris Williams		ISBN 0-937279-56-0
Starblade Battalion (Mekton)	1996	Michael MacDonald, Mark Schumann, and Benjamin Wright		ISBN 0-937279-78-1
Mekton Empire	1996	credited as source material author and interior artist with author being Guy W. McLimore Jr.		ISBN 0-9737271-5-2
Mecha Manual 2: Invasion Terra Files (Mekton)	1996	credited as editor with authors being Craig Sheely and Benjamin Wright		ISBN 0-937279-69-2
Rache Bartmoss' Brainware Blowout	1996	with David Ackerman-Gray, Edward Bolme, Craig Sheeley, Chris Williams and Benjamin Wright		ISBN 0-937279-84-6
Teenagers from Outer Space 3rd edition	1997			ISBN 0-932799-94-9
The Memoirs of Auberon of Faerie (Castle Falkenstein)	1997	credited for layout and design with authors being Lisa Pondsmith and Jeff Grubb		ISBN 0-937279-64-1
Champions, New Millennium: Alliances	1997			ISBN 0-937279-88-9
Bubblegum Crisis: Before and After	1997	credited for other writing contributions		ISBN 0-937279-92-7
The DragonBall Z Adventure Game	1999	Paul Sudlow		ISBN 1-891933-00-0
Mekton Zeta	2000	Mike MacDonald	Reprint from 1995 under ANimechaniX brand with new cover and no color interior	ISBN 0-937279-95-1
Dragonball Z Book 2: The Frieza Saga	2001			ISBN 1-891933-04-3
Cyberpunk v3.0	2005	Lisa Pondsmith and Will Moss		ISBN 1-891933-03-5
Cyberpunk Flashpak	2006			ISBN 1-891933-19-9
Beyond the Edge: Inside the Edgerunner Altcult	2008	Ken MacKriell		ISBN 978-1-891933-22-6
Cyberpunk Red	2020	with James Hutt, Cody Pondsmith, Jay Parker, J Gray, David Ackerman, Jay Kovach		ISBN 978-1-950911-06-6

For TSR

- Kara-Tur: The Eastern Realms (Oriental Adventures) (1988) with Jay Batista, Deborah Christian, John Nephew, Rick Swan (ISBN 0-88038-608-8)
- Hall of Heroes (Forgotten Realms) (1989) with Jeff Grubb, James Lowder, David Edward Martin, Bruce Nesmith, Kate Novak, Steve Perrin, R. A. Salvatore (ISBN 0-88038-711-4)
- Buck Rogers XXVc: The 25th Century Science Fiction Role Playing Game (1990)
  - Boxed set contains: Characters & Combat, The World Book, The Technology Book, maps, cards, counters
