= Comme il Faut =

Tabletop role-playing game supplement

Comme il Faut: All Things Right and Proper is a supplement published by R. Talsorian Games in 1995 for the fantasy steampunk role-playing game Castle Falkenstein.

== Contents ==
Comme il Faut, by Thomas E. Olam and Mike Pondsmith, was the second supplement that R. Talsorian Games published for the Castle Falkenstein roleplaying game. It has a wide variety of topics that a player or referee can use to enhance a Castle Falkenstein adventure. Contents include Victorian etiquette, a fashion guide for gentlemen, and a streamlined combat system.

== Reception ==
In the March 1996 edition of Dragon (Issue 227), Rick Swan did not think the book would be of interest to casual gamers, but "For the lords and ladies of New Europa, however, it’s as fun as a garage sale at Buckingham Palace."

== Reviews ==
- Shadis #24 (February 1996)
- Pyramid V1, #17 (January/February 1996)
- Rollespilsmagasinet Fønix (Danish) (Issue 12 - Mar/Apr 1996)
- Casus Belli #90
- Australian Realms #27
