= Cybergeneration =

Role-playing game

CyberGeneration
- Cover of CyberGeneration Revolution 2.0
- Designers: Mike Pondsmith
- Publishers: R. Talsorian Games; Firestorm Ink
- Publication: 1993 (1st edition); 1995 (2nd edition)
- Genres: Cyberpunk; Science fiction Superhero
- Systems: Interlock System

CyberGeneration is a follow-up to the R. Talsorian's Cyberpunk 2020 role-playing game. CyberGeneration was originally published as a supplement for Cyberpunk, but later re-released as a fully featured game in its own right under the title CyberGeneration Revolution 2.0. It is set in the year 2027, 7 years after the events in Cyberpunk 2020. The game's timeline doesn't correspond with that of the later third edition of Cyberpunk, which makes no mention of any of its contents or setting elements.

The game was licensed out in 2004 to Firestorm Ink under freelance writer Jonathan Lavallee though they are no longer the license holders.

== Overview ==
Cybergeneration (1993), published by R. Talsorian featured a new setting for Cyberpunk 2020 in an alternate version of the year 2027 with a world where the corporations are now the new governments, and where player characters are young adults that have more heroic motives in opposing the Machine.

In terms of tone, CyberGeneration differs from its predecessor somewhat, as the player characters take the part of nanotech-enhanced youngsters in an oppressive world ruled by adults who fear and seek to control them. The special powers of the CyberEvolved children give the game a definite superhero flavor. The players can be many different roles such as actors, inventors or motorbike races but they can be many more.

A second edition of Cybergeneration was published in 1995.

Firestorm Ink licensed the rights to Cybergeneration in 2004. They published several products including Generation Gap (2005) – which R. Talsorian produced a decade earlier but never published - and Researching Medicine (2005) - a MedTech update set in 2027, ending the line with the PDF-only Mile High Dragon (2009).

== Background ==
The back story revolves around the "Fox Run" incident of 2025, in which a transport of supposed scientific equipment crashed and accidentally released a weaponized nano-virus called the "Carbon Plague".

Adult humans infected by it died horribly after the virus rewrote the victims' genetic code and warped their bodies. However, the virus had a different effect on children and teenagers. Since they haven't fully matured, it altered their bodies. This granted them nanotech-enhanced powers, and made them immune carriers if they survived the illness. Society dramatically fears the capabilities of these "CyberEvolved" children, which drives them underground.

CyberEvolved, also called the "Changed", also belong to "yogangs" or youth gangs, subcultures that have distinct philosophies, styles, and special skills.

The oppressive mega-corporation Arasaka manages to dominate the US Government and gets its candidate David Whindam elected President of the new Incorporated States of America (ISA). Its laissez-faire government works with the corporations directly, becoming their puppet. The "Bureau of Relocation" (BuReloc) is a paramilitary force that runs prison camps for "unproductive" citizens and hunts down the Changed.

Multiple groups oppose, fear, and hunt the Changed, but one group stands out as protectors: the Edgerunners of old. The sourcebook describes them as wiser, more experienced and, ultimately rebels-with-a-cause (CyberGeneration offers the rules to convert old Cyberpunk 2020 characters into adults for the CyberGeneration setting).

To oppose this oppressive dictatorship, several major "Edgerunner" non-player characters from Cyberpunk 2020 run the Eden Cabal, a revolutionary movement that seeks to overthrow the ISA and BuReloc.

=== The CyberEvolved ===
So-called "CyberEvolved" children have special powers and abilities. They fit in one of several archetypes:

Original CyberEvolved
Alchemist (Manipulation) - Uses nanites to reshape matter at the molecular level.
Bolter (Bolt Throwing) - Project taser-like charged hexite metal cables or chains at a target.
Scanner (Interpretation) - Sense the brainwave patterns of others, allowing for telepathic-like abilities.
Tinman (Shaping) - Liquid metal skin formed from hexite. Limbs shape into tentacles or solid weapons and can extend; flesh provides "natural" body armor
Wizard (Arcane) - Augmented computer-hacking powers, particularly with the Virtuality augmented reality technology that has largely supplanted the Virtual Net.

Later Additions
Jammer (Holler) - Can jam media transmissions by generating electromagnetic force-fields. [MediaFront]
Medic (Sympathetic Healing) - Heals others through biokinesis. [Researching Medicine]
Scout (Probe Ops) - Creates hexite remote probes for reconnaissance. [EcoFront]

=== YoGangs ===
Members of a YoGang have unique Special Abilities, like Roles in Cyberpunk 2020.

Role	Sourcebook	Description	Special Ability
ArcoRunners	Cybergeneration	Arcology Kids	Tunneling
BeastieBoys	EcoFront	Animal handlers and trainers with a sideline in gene-splicing BioTech.	Daktari
BeaverBrats	Cybergeneration	Suburban Kids	Suburban Ninja
BoardPunk	Cybergeneration	Skateboarders.	Thrash
Buskers	Mile High Dragon	Street musicians.	?
Eco-Raiders	Cybergeneration	Eco-Warrior saboteurs.	Hayduking
Facers	Cybergeneration	Masters of disguise and impersonation	FaceDance
GlitterKids	Cybergeneration	Famous kids.	Celebrity
GoGangers	Cybergeneration	Nomad kids	Hotbiking
GoldenKids	Cybergeneration	Corporate kids	Contacts
Goths	Cybergeneration	Goth Kids	Deathwalk
Guardians	Cybergeneration	Cop Kids.	Good Guy
Lookers	MediaFront	Fashion Kids	The Look
MASHers	Researching Medicine	Med-Tech Kids	Meatball Surgery
MallBrats	Cybergeneration	Fixer kids	Boost
MegaViolents	Cybergeneration	Psycho Kids	Berserk
Moshers	Bastille Day	Punk kids	Mosh
Neo-Pioneers	EcoFront	Foresters and farmers.	Frontier Guerilla
Networkers	VirtualFront	Old-school Virtual Net hackers	Datahound
Rads	Cybergeneration	Activists and Radical Leaders	Organize
StreetFighters	Cybergeneration	Solo kids.	Kata
Squats	Cybergeneration	Street kids	Scrounge
Taggers	MediaFront	Graffiti artists	Messenger
TinkerTots	Cybergeneration	Techie kids	Kitbash
Tribals	Cybergeneration	Hippie Neo-Primitive kids	Warrior
Trogs	Bastille Day	Tunnel kids.	Spelunking
V-Punks	VirtualFront	Virtuality hackers	Private Idaho
Vidiots	Cybergeneration	Communications hackers.	Commo

== Rules ==
Cybergeneration uses R. Talsorian's Interlock System. They are similar to Cyberpunk 2020 except the skills are fewer, broader and less specialized. This was due to the characters being younger and less experienced than their elders. A group of CP2020 skills would be equivalent to one CG2027 skill. This unfortunately made experienced Cybergeneration characters (especially the CyberEvolved) potentially more versatile and powerful than Cyberpunk characters.

=== Character Generation ===
The Attributes are the same as in Cyberpunk: Intelligence, Reflexes, Cool, Technical Ability, Luck, Attractiveness, Movement, Empathy, and Body. The player must divide 50 points between them and levels range from a minimum of 2 to a starting maximum of 8. Skill levels range from 0 (no experience at all) to 10 (top of their field). The player must divide 40 points between them.

The character's age ranges between 8 and 18 years old and is either chosen by the player or can be randomized (2d6 + 6 for children or 1d6 + 12 for teens).

== Supplements ==
R. Talsorian supported CyberGeneration Revolution 2.0 with a quartet of supplements. Each supplement expanded on the world of 2027 as well as new Yogangs and CyberEvolved. Later, licensee Firestorm Ink would release another pair of supplements in support of the game.

The Documents of the Revolution Supplements (published by R. Talsorian)

- EcoFront, impact of corporate America on the environment.
- MediaFront, state of news agencies, Braindance, and Virtuality.
- VirtualFront, state of the Net post-ISA occupation.

Scenario supplements (published by R. Talsorian)

- Bastille Day, the characters are recruited by Rache Bartmoss to find and rescue Spider Murphy.

Other supplements (published by Firestorm Ink)

- Generation Gap (2004) - running and playing CyberGeneration. This was a polished and edited version of R. Talsorian's rough draft.
- Researching Medicine (2005) - the state of medicine and MedTechies in 2027.
- Mile High Dragon (2009) - a city sourcebook about Denver, Colorado.

== Reception ==
Derek Pearcy reviewed Cybergeneration for Pyramid #4 (Nov./Dec., 1993) and stated that "The whole thing was written to be seriously non-linear, but a cleaner design might have helped organize things better for players who don't want to memorize the contents of the book - the type of players who will love Cybergeneration."

Andy Butcher reviewed Cybergeneration for Arcane magazine, rating it a 9 out of 10 overall. Butcher comments that "A lot of people talk about systems that encourage roleplaying over 'roll playing', Cybergeneration is one of the few games I've encountered that actually manages to do so, not by using a heavy-handed or pretentious approach, but by the very nature of the game environment."

== Reviews ==
- Challenge #76 (1995)
- Shadis #25 (March, 1996)
- Casus Belli #78
- Australian Realms #14
- Australian Realms #30
