= The Lost Notebooks of Leonardo da Vinci =

1995 RPG supplement

The Lost Notebooks of Leonardo da Vinci is a supplement published by R. Talsorian Games (RTG) in 1995 for the steampunk role-playing game Castle Falkenstein. Critics were disappointed by the book, saying that its contents were interesting but not particularly useful.

== Contents ==
The Lost Notebooks of Leonardo da Vinci is a sourcebook for the role-playing game Castle Falkenstein that describes a parchment grimoire in the castle's library supposedly written by Leonardo da Vinci. The notebook describes the magickal engines he invented, such as a Draining Engine, Auditorial Illusion Engine, Inferno Engine, Glacial Engine, Invisibility Engines, and Dimensional Engine. A section of the notebook deals with "Star Iron", which comes from meteorites, and another section describes how an adventurer could build one of these machines. The book also includes Leonardo's commentaries of his wisdom and philosophy, his life in Florence, and criticism of city's society and the ruling House of Borgia.

== Publication history ==
In 1994, Michael Pondsmith designed the steampunk role-playing game Castle Falkenstein, which was published by RTG. It proved popular and RTG released several supplements and sourcebooks for it, including The Lost Notebooks of Leonardo da Vinci, a 128-page softcover book designed by Edward Bolme with contributions from Mark Schumann and Michael Pondsmith, and illustrations by James Allen Higgins.

== Reception ==
In Issue 26 of Shadis, Kevin Jones noted the research that had gone into the ambiance of the book, writing, "All of the politics that were affecting da Vinci's writing during the Renaissance are present in The Lost Notebooks, reflected by da Vinci's careful comments to make certain the reader would not construe his experiments with black magic." Jones concluded, "When you read this one, you have to keep reminding yourself that it's a sourcebook for a role-playing game. But then again, just about all of the Falkenstein books are written that way. It makes [Castle Falkenstein] one of the most intriguing RPGs a player could hope for."

In Issue 30 of the Australian game magazine Australian Realms, Lee Sheppard wrote, "I never thought I'd say this about a Castle Falkenstein product, but I was disappointed with Lost Notebooks. It is the events of his time that cause [Leonardo] to design most of these inventions, and in that sense, this aspect of the book at least ties this all together logically. However, the specific events depicted really serve no other purpose. These are events 300 years removed from the [19th century] timeline. It’s hard enough to get yourself comfortably around 1870s European history, let alone being sidetracked by the machinations of the Borgias." Sheppard also didn't like the impossibility of making one of Leonardo's machines, pointing out, "don't even think about trying to create one of these devices. While a campaign involving a journey to some distant crater to get enough Star Iron to make your engine has great gaming potential, those unable to do so are left with theft as the only option. Bad news if you want to stay on the right side of the law." Sheppard concluded, "this book really didn’t inspire me to strap on my sword, load up my reciprocator and take on impossible odds. Instead, I found Lost Notebooks a lot of space for one plot device. For completists only."

In Dragon #234, Rick Swan questioned the usefulness of this book, writing, "thumbs down to Lost Notebooks, a collection of bizarre inventions (healing devices, weather controllers) that's beautiful to behold but not particularly useful. Nor is it much fun to read, thanks to authentic-sounding but stilted writing." Swan concluded with a recommendation to avoid this book, writing "Let Leonardo rest in peace."

In Issue 92 of the French games magazine Casus Belli, Fabrice Colin questioned the timing of this supplement, saying, "All of this is really very interesting, but was it really essential at the moment? Why not first release a supplement on Europe or a large-scale campaign? It seems the superfluous has been given to us before the essentials."

In Issue 4 of the French RPG magazine EasteNWest, Cédric Chaillou and Gwénolé Bigot found that "The supplement is well done and interesting to read, and the 'lost notebooks' occupy an important place in the world of Castle Falkenstein. However, it is difficult to integrate these elements into a campaign or scenario, because the machines are intended to constitute a state secret and therefore are extremely rare. These may lead to intrigue or interesting spy stories, but for the main part, the book remains largely academic, and extremely limited in terms of play."

When Casus Belli was rebooted in the 21st century, Sylvestre Picard did a retrospective review of Castle Falkenstein and all of its supplements, and damned The Lost Notebooks with faint praise, writing that it was "amusing but minor ... Nothing earth-shattering."

== Other reviews and commentary ==
- Rollespilsmagasinet Fønix (Danish) (Issue 12 - Mar/Apr 1996)
