= Armored Trooper VOTOMS: The Roleplaying Game =

Tabletop role-playing game

Armored Trooper VOTOMS: The Roleplaying Game is a science fiction mecha role-playing game published by R. Talsorian Games (RTG) in 1997 that is based on the anime series Armored Trooper VOTOMS.

== Description ==
AT VOTOMS (Armored Trooper Vertical One-Man Tank for Offense and Maneuvers) is a science-fiction role-playing game in which players take on the role of heroes who engage in combat using large robots. The game uses the Fuzion game system that was previously used by RTG in Mekton Z. The role-playing game is closely wedded to the storyline of the AT VOTOMS anime series, which features warfare, subversion, treachery and escape.

== Publication history ==
Michael Pondsmith, inspired by Japanese mecha anime, founded RTG in 1985 to publish mecha-focused games. One of these was Armored Trooper VOTOMS: The Roleplaying Game, published in 1997 as a 175-page softcover book with cover art by Alex Okita and Ted Talsorian. Based on the 52-episode Japanese anime series Armored Trooper VOTOMS (装甲騎兵ボトムズ, Sōkō Kihei Botomuzu) produced in 1983 by Nippon Sunrise, the game was created by Tim Eldred, with contributions by Paul Sudlow, Mike Pondsmith and Benjamin Wright. RTG also produced a board game, Armored Trooper VOTOMS: Conflict on Kummen.

The RTG game is not related to a Japanese-language role-playing game titled Armored Trooper Votoms TRPG created by Tsuneo Tateno and published in Japan.

== Reception ==
In Issue 113 of the French games magazine Casus Belli, Cédric Littardi called this game "more of a sourcebook for the anime series than a full-fledged game." Despite this, Littardi wrote that it was "nevertheless a gripping series, full of twists and turns, which involves intergalactic conspiracies of various degrees in a universe at permanent war." Because of this, Littardi suggested that, in the hands of a capable referee, "it offers great role-playing opportunities ... characterized by a dark atmosphere, combat in war machines, and the manipulation of characters by forces beyond their control, but to which their destinies are inexorably linked."

In Issue 208 of Dragon, Allen Varney noted that with the publication of this book, "Talsorian has tapped into a large non-gaming market of anime fans, and the response has been enthusiastic. As a staffer said at Origins, 'These fans aren't used to seeing these books in English.'"
