= Firestorm: Stormfront =

- Genre: Adventure
- Publisher: R. Talsorian Games

Firestorm: Stormfront is a 1997 role-playing game adventure published by R. Talsorian Games for Cyberpunk.

== Plot summary ==
Firestorm: Stormfront is an adventure in which the explosive onset of the Fourth Corporate War is chronicled. Set in a world where corporate rivalries escalate from boardroom maneuvers to armed conflict, the supplement begins with a financial collapse—German ocean engineering firm IHAG goes bankrupt, triggering a power struggle between American OTEC and French CINO. When each side recruits military megacorps—Militech and Arasaka—the skirmish evolves into a full-scale war. The book divides the conflict into two phases: the Ocean War, fought across global seas and involving submarines, cybernetic marine life, and underwater gear; and the Covert War, a shadowy battle of espionage, sabotage, and stealth tech. Each phase includes background lore, technical details, and mission folios—five scenarios per theater, plus a sixth finale mission that sets the stage for the sequel, Shockwave. Players can influence the war's outcome using the "Not Blood, But Money" system, where successful missions affect stock prices and corporate fortunes. The supplement also introduces new character roles, gear, and training options, and provides ready-made NPC teams.

== Publication history ==
Firestorm: Stormfront is the first volume in R. Talsorian's Firestorm series for Cyberpunk 2020.

Shannon Appelcline noted that by the late 1990s as rumors began for a Fuzion-based Cyberpunk third edition, "R. Talsorian showed that they were serious by kicking off a trilogy that would change the world of Cyberpunk in advance of the new edition. Firestorm: Stormfront (1997) and Firestorm: Shockwave (1997) showed the beginning of a story of a corporate takeover that turned into a global conflict."

== Reception ==
Jim Swallow reviewed Firestorm: Stormfront for Arcane magazine, rating it an 8 out of 10 overall, and stated that "Long awaited and worth it, the first of the Firestorm duo promises much and provides it all. Stormfront is an excellent combination of new rules utility, background source material and adventures – it's a must-have for all Cyberpunk referees."

== Reviews ==
- Shadis #37 (1997)
- Backstab #4
- Casus Belli #114
