= Firestorm: Shockwave =

- Publisher: R. Talsorian Games
- Publication date: 1997

Firestorm: Shockwave is a 1997 role-playing game adventure published by R. Talsorian Games for Cyberpunk.

== Plot summary ==
Firestorm: Shockwave is an adventure in which Arasaka and Militech have escalated into an all-out global corporate war, reducing cities to rubble and dragging Edgerunners into open, high-tech battles of mass destruction.

== Reviews ==
- Casus Belli #118
- Backstab #7
- Science Fiction Age
