= Live & Direct: Multimedia in the Cyberpunk Age =

Live & Direct: Multimedia in the Cyberpunk Age is a 1996 role-playing game supplement published by R. Talsorian Games for Cyberpunk.

== Contents ==
Live & Direct: Multimedia in the Cyberpunk Age is a supplement in which the media landscape is explored, spotlighting one of the often-overlooked character types: the Media. From the influence of Network 54 and DMS to the world of news helicopters and corporate propaganda, the supplement expands the role and potential of media operatives in dystopian campaigns. It begins with a concise history of mass media, charting its evolution from 20th-century decline to its reconstitution as a tool of corporate dominance in the 21st century. Key media technologies like the screamsheet and braindance are introduced. Players gain access to several new character archetypes derived from the original Media class—including war correspondents and moral crusaders—each supported by rules for reporting, publishing, and leveraging influence. For GMs, the book offers detailed background on global media conglomerates and advice on integrating the Media into campaigns as allies or adversaries.

== Reception ==
Alex Bund reviewed Live & Direct: Multimedia in the Cyberpunk Age for Arcane magazine, rating it a 7 out of 10 overall, and stated that "An excellent sourcebook, though in general the internal artwork does let it down somewhat. However, for all those who want to try out a different angle in the Cyberpunk world, this supplement is something of а must."

== Reviews ==
- Shadis #34
