= Generic role-playing game system =

Role-playing game system designed to be independent of setting and genre

A generic or universal role-playing game system is a role-playing game system designed to be independent of campaign setting and genre. Its rules should, in theory, work the same way for any setting, world, environment or genre.

== History ==
The term "generic" has been used since the earliest days of gaming to describe a system that can be used for any type or style of game. There is some dispute among role-playing enthusiasts on when the concept of a generic system originated and which was the first one published.

According to Shannon Appelcline, Chaosium's Basic Role-Playing (BRP, 1980), was the first generic role-playing system. BRP was a "cut-down" version of Chaosium's RuneQuest role-playing game and formed the foundation for the Stormbringer RPG, and was also adopted for Call of Cthulhu, the first horror role-playing game. The publication of GURPS (Generic Universal Role-Playing System, 1986) as a completely setting-independent game and its commercial and creative success added credence to the movement. The development of the Hero System (1989) from the superhero role-playing game Champions also had a profound influence in popularizing the concept.

It truly became a dominant subject in RPG design with the release of the Third Edition of Dungeons & Dragons (2000) and the d20 System along with the creation of the Open Gaming License (OGL).

== Definition ==
The Fuzion 5.02 rules uses the term "generic" to describe its basic ruleset as separate from its Champions and Interlock forerunners. In the second paragraph of the introduction to GURPS 3rd Edition the authors define "generic" as a means to satisfy players and game masters of many styles of play and feel for rules. This is repeated in the updated 4th edition rules along with acknowledgments to Champions as the first truly flexible character creation system.

Some d20 derivative, such as Green Ronin Publishing's Mutants & Masterminds and True20 Adventure Roleplaying, are presented as fully generic systems.

== Other influential generic systems ==
- Blacksburg Tactical Research Center's EABA
- Eden Studios' Unisystem
- Evil Hat Productions' FATE rpg
- Grey Ghost Press' FUDGE
- Guardians of Order's Tri-Stat System
- Pinnacle Entertainment Group's Savage Worlds
- R. Talsorian Games's Fuzion and Interlock System
- West End Games's D6 and Masterbook systems
