= Rockerboy =

Role-playing game supplement

Cover art by Doug Andersen, 1989

Rockerboy is a supplement published by R. Talsorian Games in 1989 for the dystopian near-future role-playing game Cyberpunk.

== Contents ==
Rockerboy is a supplement that takes the form of a fictional lifestyle magazine. The contents include rules for backgrounds that can be used for Rockerboy characters, and appropriate equipment. Several short scenarios are also included.

== Publication history ==
Rockerboy was written by Colin Fisk, Will Moss, Scott Ruggels, David Ackerman, Glenn Wildermuth, Sam Shirley, and Mike Pondsmith, with interior art by Colin Fisk, Harrison Fong, Chris Hockabout, Mike Pondsmith, and Scott Ruggels, and cover by Doug Andersen, and was published by R. Talsorian Games in 1989 as an 80-page book.

== Reception ==
In the June 1990 edition of Games International, the reviewer thought the presentation "lacks the slick colour production of FASA's Shadowrun supplements" but admired this product for its "accurately appalling Rolling Stone style interviews, reviews and adverts."

Stephan Wieck reviewed the product in the June–July 1990 issue of White Wolf. His review was generally negative, with a summary that it had "little useful information" while pointing to a few articles as relatively good. He rated it overall at 2 of 5 points.

== Other reviews ==
- Windgeflüster Issue 27 (Oct 1994, p.31, in German)
- GamesMaster International Issue 5 (Dec 1990, p.10)
- Games Review Vol.2 Issue 7 (August 1990, p.28)
