= The Book of Sigils =

Tabletop role-playing game supplement

The cover of The Book of Sigils

The Book of Sigils is a supplement published by R. Talsorian Games in 1995 for the Victorian steampunk role-playing game Castle Falkenstein.

== Contents ==
The Book of Sigils, written by Anthony Savile, presents new wizard character options with more detail about magic in the world of Castle Falkenstein, as well as details about The Sorcerous Orders of New Europa.

== Reception ==
In the May 1996 edition of Arcane (Issue 6), David S Comford thought highly of this book, calling it "an essential purchase for any Castle Falkenstein referee, since it contains fundamental expansions to the game and is also a useful guide to what to expect if the characters decide to roam outside of New Europa." Comford concluded by giving the book an above average rating of 8 out of 10.

In the October 1996 edition of Dragon (Issue #234), Rick Swan was enthusiastic about the detail provided, saying "Players interested in Victorian wizardry should have a ball."

== Reviews ==
- Shadis #26 (April, 1996)
- Valkyrie #14 (1997)
- Casus Belli #95
- Australian Realms #30
