= Starblade Battalion =

1996 Mekton role-playing game supplement

- Publisher: R. Talsorian Games
- Publication date: 1996

Starblade Battalion is a 1996 role-playing game supplement published by R. Talsorian Games for Mekton.

== Contents ==
Starblade Battalion is a supplement in which a campaign setting integrates themes from the Cyberpunk universe. Set in the year 2180, the world is gripped by escalating tensions between the Earth-based United Stellar States Alliance—an eco-militant regime—and the expansionist Pleiades Confederation, dominated by the Solingen Corporation. When diplomacy fails and war looms, the player characters join the Starblade Battalion, a rebellious third force composed of outcasts and defectors tasked with unraveling hidden agendas and averting catastrophe. It uses log entries, NPC data, and campaign seeds, and introduces flexible character archetypes, new gear, and three short adventure scenarios.

== Publication history ==
Shannon Appelcline noted that the world of Algol setting went largely unused in the Mekton Zeta edition, which now had several possible settings, and "Starbale Battalion Mekton (1996) revealed another new setting, one that was sort of a crossover; it was a possible future for the world of Cyberpunk. It would also be the final supplement for Mekton."

== Reception ==
Jim Swallow reviewed Starblade Battalion for Arcane magazine, rating it an 8 out of 10 overall, and stated that "Previous Mekton world books, such as Operation Rimfire and Invasion Terra, have relied on the use of pre-generated characters to move the storyline along, but Starblade Battalion eschews this approach to provide outline PC 'classes' and a few pointers. Along with three short scenarios, the book gives good value for money and is the best background yet for the game - and it's still ripe for expansion via more sourcebooks."

== Reviews ==
- Casus Belli #104
- Valkyrie #15 (1997)
