= Fieldtrip (Teenagers from Outer Space) =

Cover art by Scott Ruggles, 1987

Fieldtrip is an adventure published by R. Talsorian Games in 1987 for the light-hearted science-fiction role-playing game Teenagers from Outer Space.

== Plot summary ==
In Fieldtrip, the students of Valleyview High School go on a field trip accompanied by their Alien Control Officer, where they are confronted by killer schoolbuses, demon bikers, and pirates. The scenario comes with a mini-boardgame titled "Save the Earth."

== Publication history ==
Fieldtrip was written by Dave Friedland, with art by Scott Ruggles, and was published by R. Talsorian Games in 1987 as a 36-page book.

== Reviews ==
In the April 1988 edition of Dragon (Issue #132), Jim Bambra liked Fieldtrip, saying the wacky plot came "complete with excellent staging tips and enough plot shifts to keep the most avid roller-coaster fan happy. Fieldtrip maintains a rapid breakneck pace throughout." Bamra concluded, "This supplement is perfect for launching an extended Teenagers from Outer Space game campaign."
