= Champions: New Millennium =

Champions: New Millennium is a 1997 role-playing game supplement published by Hero Games and R. Talsorian Games for Champions.

== Contents ==
Champions: New Millennium was a new edition of Champions using the Fuzion system.

== Publication history ==
Shannon Appelcline explained that "Hero did embrace Fuzion, at least temporarily. They quickly released Champions: The New Millennium (1997), the fifth edition of their core Champions rulebook. However, it was so totally revamped that not only was there a fan revolt, but today New Millennium is largely ignored when counting Champions game editions." Appelcline continued by saying that "Hero Games got just a single book out during their Cybergames year: a new second edition of Champions: New Millennium (2000), now dual-statted for Fuzion and the Hero System — which had been Hero's plans for all their new products, following their departure from R. Talsorian."

== Reception ==
Phil Masters reviewed Champions: New Millennium for Arcane magazine, rating it a 6 out of 10 overall, and stated that "Champions: The New Millennium offers colourful superhero gaming that lets you mix in stuff from old Champions books, Bubblegum Crisis, Cyberpunk, and Mekton Zeta. On the down-side, though, the writing is not always the best, there's no index, the rules seem rushed, and the whole book suffers from confused design. The new gameworld is internally consistent, but nothing too special. Existing players used to the detail of old-style Champions probably won't convert, while new players may get confused by all the optional stuff. But Champions is back. Some good support material could make it a winner yet."

The reviewer from Pyramid #28 (Nov./Dec., 1997) stated that "I think it's very reassuring that when the original creators of the classic Champions superhero roleplaying game decided to put out a new edition, they went the full nine. Champions: New Millennium is unlike any previous edition of Champions, with a radically changed gaming universe and brand new system."

== Reviews ==
- Alarums & Excursions (Issue 262 - Jun 1997)
- Backstab #8
- Casus Belli #106
