= Chromebook (Cyberpunk 2020) =

1991 RPG sourcebook

Chromebook is a 1991 role-playing game supplement published by R. Talsorian Games for Cyberpunk.

== Contents ==
Chromebook is a sourcebook featuring various cyberpunk weapons, armor, cyberware, fashion, vehicles and chipware.

== Reviews ==
- Casus Belli #64
- Casus Belli No. 69 (May 1992)
- Challenge No. 53 (Oct., 1991)
- Magia i Miecz No. 25 (January 1996) (Polish)
- Windgeflüster (Issue 27 - Oct 1994)
- C64 Fun
