= Interface (magazine) =

Gaming magazine

Cover of the first issue

Interface is a game magazine published by Prometheus Press between 1990 and 1992 that was licensed to publish articles about R. Talsorian Games's dystopian near-future role-playing game Cyberpunk.

== Publication history ==
In 1990, three dedicated fans of Cyberpunk who lived in Alameda, California — Kevin DeAntonio, Chris Hockabout, and Thaddeus Howze — approached R. Talsorian Games about producing an independent magazine about the game. R. Talsorian agreed to license them, and the three formed Prometheus Press to publish their fanzine Interface. Each issue featured a full-color cover and black & white interior.

Six issues of the magazine were published between 1990 and 1992.

== Index of articles ==
=== Volume 1, #1: Keeping the Peace ===
(44 pages.)

- NuCyber, NuTech, NuMed: New cybernetic implants, new gear, new medicine.
- Walking the Beat in Night City
- LawTech Unlimited: New law enforcement armor, weapons, and gear.
- Design and augmentation rules for Robohounds (mechatronic K9 units).
- Police Profile: The Givers of Pain
- Inmate Penal Corps
- Corporate Review: Ocean Technology & Energy Corp (OTEC)
- Altered States 1: New Drugs
- Cyber-Reviews: Street Lethal by Steven Barnes; Vacuum Flowers by Michael Swanwick.

=== Volume 1, #2 (1991) ===
(48 pages. Cover art by Chris Hockabout.)

  - NuCyber, NuTech: New cybernetic hand and leg implants; new gear
  - New Skills: Skating / Skateboarding, Electronic Counter-Measures, Cadre Tactics
  - "Getting Along": Roleplaying COOL and EMPATHY attributes in Cyberpunk (Peter Christian)
  - "Your Money or Your Life": Wages in Cyberpunk (Justin Schmid)
  - Police Profiles: Ripperdocs
  - Hardware Closeup: The OTEC SEV-1 stealth hovercraft.
  - Subordinate/Alternate Character Classes 1
  - Cyber-Reviews: Batman: Digital Justice by Pepe Moreno; Hardware, RoboCop 2, Total Recall (1990).

=== Volume 1, #3 (1991) ===
(56 pages. Cover art by Mike Ebert.)

- NuCyber, NuWare: New cybernetics; New Cyberdeck programs
- Government Profile: New Antarctican Collective
- Corporate Review: Revolution Genetics Inc
- New Service Organization: Troubleshooter Cabs.
- Artificial Intelligence 1: AIs in Cyberpunk RPGs
- Altered States: New drugs
- NuScience: Skinmask pollution filter, Vend-a-Mod chip vending machine
- Fashion: NewLook faux cybernetics.
- "Interview With a Predator": Q&A with Colonel "Butch" Schaffer IPC, commander of the "Predators" Centron
- "What's that up ahead?": Random driving encounters in Cyberpunk 2020.
- Subordinate/Alternate Character Classes 2:
  - Solo subtypes (Military Op, Corporate Op, Cyber-Soldier, Bodyguard, Bounty Hunter, Street Samurai).
  - Netrunner subtype (Rogue AI Hunter).
- Cyber-Reviews: ME: A Novel of Self-Discovery by Thomas T. Thomas; Akira, Trancers.

=== Volume 1, #4 (1991) ===
(56 pages.)

- "Nomad Chronicles": Nomad characters; types of Nomad Packs.
- Corporate Review: Consolidated Agriculture
- Artificial Intelligence 2: "Dragons and Dragonslayers" Rogue AIs and Rogue Hunter NPCs.
- "Night City Blues" Fiction by Chris Hockabout
- "To Bear Arms" How to Manage Weapons and Armor in Cyberpunk 2020
- Subordinate/Alternate Character Classes 3
- Cyber-Reviews: Trancers 2, Class of 1999, Moon 44, Bladerunner: The Director's Cut (1991), Highlander II: The Quickening

=== Volume 2, #1 (1992) ===
(56 pages, cover art by Tom Shaw)

- OmniEye Interviewer's Camera
- Tenaka Sanyo Portable Editing Lab
- Exotech Remote Surveillance
- Live-Feed Cyberoptic Option
- Medusa 2000
- Just the Fax, Ma'am
- Electric Nightmares
- Reporter Profiles: Clarise DeWinter
- Reporter Profiles: Edward "Flash" Leudowski
- Reporter Profiles: Zaphial "Argus" Keyes
- Facing the Consequences
- Talk Hard!
- A job with ATTITUDE
- Aline3
- Mann and Machine
- The Lawnmower Man
- Night's Edge

=== Volume 2, #2 (1992) ===
(68 pages. Cover art by Tom Shaw)

- NuCyberware and Ectotechnology
- Cults - Hope and Horrors
- Call of Cthulhu–Cyberpunk Conversion Rules
- Cult Profiles
- Scenarios: "Transference" and "A Policy of Pain"
- Data Sampling

== Reception ==
In the September 1992 edition of Dragon (#185), Allen Varney reviewed the third issue of the magazine, and while he called one article "meaty", he noted that most of the magazine "falls distinctly below the median [...] Even the good articles could stand more pizazz, and the editorial style needs a lot more polish." Despite this, he concluded "this fan magazine offers remarkable value for the dedicated Cyberpunk referee."
