= Teenagers from Outer Space =

Teenagers from Outer Space may refer to:

- Teenagers from Outer Space (film), a 1959 science fiction film
- Teenagers from Outer Space (role-playing game), a 1987 tabletop game
