= Mekton Zeta Plus =

1995 tabletop game supplement

Mekton Zeta Plus is a 1995 role-playing game supplement published by R. Talsorian Games for Mekton.

== Contents ==
Mekton Zeta Plus is a supplement in which the Mekton Technical System allows players to build mecha and vehicles—alongside new rules, powers, and options to expand campaigns.

== Publication history ==
The supplement of advanced rules called Mekton Zeta Plus in 1995 followed the release of the Mekton Zeta rules.

== Reviews ==
- Australian Realms #27
- Backstab #5
- Shadis #25 (March, 1996)
- Comics Buyer's Guide
