= Solo of Fortune =

Tabletop role-playing game supplement

Solo of Fortune is a 1989 role-playing game supplement published by R. Talsorian Games for Cyberpunk.

== Contents ==
Solo of Fortune is the first in a series of Cyberpunk supplements, with each book focusing on a different character class.

== Reception ==
Solo of Fortune was reviewed in Space Gamer Vol. II No. 2. The reviewer commented that "If your campaign uses Solos or vehicles to any extent, it'll be worth your while."

== Reviews ==
- Casus Belli #53
- Casus Belli #64
