= Roadstriker =

1986 role-playing game supplement

Roadstriker is a 1986 role-playing game supplement for Mekton published by R. Talsorian Games.

== Contents ==
Roadstriker is a supplement which details additional mecha and expands the information on transforming from the original Mekton rules.

== Reception ==
Phil Frances reviewed Roadstriker for White Dwarf #87, and stated that "In all, a most worthwhile effort – not as slick as FASA's Mechwarrior or Battletech, but admirably simple and flexible."

David Jacobs reviewed Roadstriker in Space Gamer/Fantasy Gamer No. 79. Jacobs commented that "It's a collection of scenarios complete with NPC's for back up and background, and a great way to introduce roadstrikers to your Mekton gaming."

== Reviews ==
- Challenge #49 (March/April, 1991)
