= Dragon Ball Z: The Anime Adventure Game =

Tabletop role-playing game

Cover art by Akira Toriyama, 1999

Dragon Ball Z: The Anime Adventure Game is a role-playing game published by R. Talsorian Games in 1999 that is based on the Dragon Ball Z anime.

== Description ==
Dragon Ball Z: The Anime Adventure Game is a role-playing game that uses the Instant Fuzion game rules. The book includes:

- an introduction to Dragon Ball and Dragon Ball Z
- a summary of the storyline
- the major heroes and villains
- The Dragon Ball world

The rules of Instant Fuzion are explained, including combat and fighting mastery. The book also explains how to write a Dragon Ball Z adventure.

== Publication history ==
Dragon Ball Z, the sequel to the Dragon Ball anime series, was produced from 1988 to 1996. In 1999, R. Talsorian Games acquired the license to produce a role-playing game based on the series. The result was Dragon Ball Z: The Anime Adventure Game, a 144-page softcover book written by Michael A. Pondsmith, Cindy Fukunaga, and Paul Sudlow, with illustrations and cover art by Akira Toriyama, and published by R. Talsorian Games in 1999.

In the 2014 book Designers & Dragons: The '80s, Shannon Appelcline explained that "Besides maintaining reprints of old products — such as the new ANimechaniX-branded Mekton Zeta (2000) — R. Talsorian also produced one new product during their last years in Albany, California: The Dragonball Z Adventure Game (1999), a new Fuzion game licensed from the very popular anime. Though no one could have predicted it in 1999, it would be the entire basis of the company for the next several years, because an even bigger change was coming."

Appelcline described how "Core Fuzion (2002) made R. Talsorian's new generic system available in a generalized form, but it was just a blip in R. Talsorian’s production. R. Talsorian's biggest focus was instead on the Dragonball Z RPG, which was doing very well in anime markets, though it was scarcely noticed in the RPG community. R. Talsorian published two Dragonball Z supplements: Dragonball Z Book 2: The Frieza Saga (2001) and The Garlic Jr. • Trunks • Android Sagas (2002)." Appelcline noted that ultimately "After 2002, it looked like R. Talsorian was gone. Nothing but Dragonball Z had been published since 1997, and now even that line came to an end."

== Reception ==
Lynx Winters pointed out ambiguous and badly written rules in combat, as well as rules that allowed players to "break" the game, and concluded, "this game doesn't work. The rules fall apart from the word 'go'."

== Reviews ==
- Pyramid
