= Alliances (Champions) =

Role-playing game supplement by Hero Games

Alliances is a supplement published by Hero Games in 1997 for the superhero role-playing game Champions.

== Publication history ==
Hero Games published the Champions superhero role-playing game in 1981. They later supported the Fuzion rules system used in Champions with two supplements: Alliances (1997) and Bay City (1997). These two were the only books published for use with the Champions Fuzion system.

Alliances details five organizations, including a summary of their history, and the facilities owned by each. The organizations include:

- The Arcadian Academy (a superhero training school)
- the Guard (a paramilitary organization)
- Oddyssey Research Centre (specializing in the development of robots and time machines)

The book also includes a number of short adventure hooks.

== Reception ==
In the February 1998 edition Dragon (Issue #244), Rick Swan found the adventure hooks "intriguing", but warned that the book wasn't for everyone: "If you’re a light-‘n’-easy Legion of Super Heroes kinda guy, Alliances is right up your alley. But if you’re the grim-‘n’-gritty Image Comics type, this’ll seem about as interesting as a compendium of daycare centers."

== Reviews ==
- Backstab #8
