= Near Orbit =

Role-playing game supplement

Near Orbit is a 1989 role-playing game supplement published by R. Talsorian Games for Cyberpunk.

== Contents ==
Near Orbit is a supplement that introduces rules for adventuring in zero-gravity, in settings including geosynchronous orbit above the planet as well the furthest reach of humanity thus far on the surface of the Moon.

== Reception ==
Near Orbit was reviewed in Space Gamer/Fantasy Gamer No. 88. The reviewer commented that "Overall, the strengths of the supplement far outweigh the weaknesses. To my knowledge, this is the first hard science system set in outer space. It does not rely on aliens or 'the Force'; explosive decompression is exciting enough thank you. The technical background and ideas herein would be a worthy addition to any modern role-playing system, say James Bond or Top Secret."
