= Usagi Yojimbo Roleplaying Game =

Manga-based role-playing game by Greg Stolze

Usagi Yojimbo (1997)
Role Playing Game
- Designers: Greg Stolze
- Publishers: Gold Rush Games
- Publication: 1997
- Genres: Anthropomorphic fantasy, historical
- Systems: Fuzion

Usagi Yojimbo Roleplaying Game is a licensed tabletop role-playing game written by Greg Stolze and published by Gold Rush Games in 1997.

== Setting ==
It is based on the acclaimed comic book Usagi Yojimbo, created by Stan Sakai. Set in a fantastical version of feudal Japan populated by anthropomorphic animals, the game uses the Fuzion rules system and invites players to step into the roles of wandering ronin, samurai, and other warriors navigating a world of honor, adventure, and mystical threats.

== Publication history ==
Shannon Appelcline commented that, aside from Hero Games, "Old company friend Gold Rush Games was another early publisher of licensed Fuzion games, beginning with Usagi Yojimbo (1997), based on the comic book adventures of a samurai rabbit."

== Reception ==
The reviewer from Pyramid #30 (March/April, 1998) stated that "Although the characters appear cartoonish, many of the stories are quite serious, and the violence in the comic book is sometimes graphic. Players of the RPG can mix-and-match seriousness and humor in their games as desired; the game definitely supports both."

== Reviews ==
- Dragon #252 (October 1998)
