= The Legacy of Zorro =

- Designers: Mark Arsenault
- Publishers: Gold Rush Games
- Publication: 2001
- Genres: Swashbuckler, historical
- Systems: Instant Fuzion

The Legacy of Zorro is a licensed tabletop role-playing game written by Mark Arsenault and published by Gold Rush Games in 2001. It is based on the legendary swashbuckling hero Zorro, created by Johnston McCulley in 1919. Set in early 19th-century Spanish California, the game uses the Instant Fuzion rules system and invites players to take on the roles of heroes chosen and trained by Zorro himself to aid him in his fight against injustice and oppression.

== Gameplay ==
The Legacy of Zorro is a role-playing game that uses the Instant Fuzion game rules. The 32-page book includes:

- An introduction to role-playing games
- An overview of Zorro’s world in early 19th-century Spanish California
- A simplified rule system
- Four pre-generated heroes trained by Zorro
- A complete introductory adventure with a two-page map

The game also features cardboard miniatures, hex maps, and full character sheets.

== Reviews ==
- Pyramid
- Backstab
- Games Unplugged (Issue 8 - June 2001)
