= Paul Lidberg =

American game designer

- Occupation: Game designer

Paul Arden Lidberg was a game designer of board games and role-playing games.

== Career ==
Paul Lidberg worked for both Crunchy Frog Enterprises and Nightshift Games, and also spent approximately six months working at the Waterloo game store in Phoenix, Arizona that was founded by Scott Bizar of Fantasy Games Unlimited. Lidberg and Douglas Niles designed the board game A Line in the Sand (1991) about the Gulf War.

Lidberg inquired with FASA about the Battletech license, but Sam Lewis instead convinced Lidberg to license Renegade Legion from FASA; Lidberg found that retailers and distributors would not support Renegade Legion because FASA was not promoting it directly, so the rights to the game reverted back to FASA in 1996 when Crunchy Frog Enterprises did not promote the game heavily enough.

On October 12, 2012 Lidberg attempted to use the crowdfunding site Kickstarter to fund a new game called The SuperFogeys. On November 28, 2012 the campaign was successfully funded and he received the funding he requested in the campaign. After his successful funding for The SuperFogeys he started a second Kickstarter campaign on January 6, 2013 for a different game called Zombie Stomp The Game. On January 20, 2013 this campaign was also successfully funded and he received the funding he requested in the campaign.

Lidberg died from a stroke June 13, 2022.

== See also ==
- The Horror Beneath
