= Interlock System =

Role-playing game system by R. Talsorian Games

The Interlock System is R. Talsorian Games' proprietary tabletop role-playing system.

== History ==
Interlock was a game system by R. Talsorian Games based on a system of adding a bonus to a roll on a 10-sided die. Mekton II (1987), the third edition of R. Talsorian's mecha game, was the first game to use the full-fledged Interlock system, and featured point-based characters with a character background system adapted from the original Mekton, though in a more complex and comprehensive form called Lifepaths. Cyberpunk 2013 (1988) was the second design to feature R. Talsorian's Interlock system. Cyberpunk introduced a new combat system to Interlock called "Friday Night Firefight", while the second edition of the game, Cyberpunk 2020 (1990), made further improvements on the Interlock system resulting in what is now known as "Standard Interlock".

Interlock is one of the parents of the Fuzion system, the other being the Hero System. Characters are created by choosing skills rather than by choosing a character class, as in many other games.

The Interlock System is used in the Cyberpunk 2020 and Mekton role-playing games. A variant is used in Teenagers from Outer Space and the Japanese Gundam Senki RPG.

== System ==
Stats and skills are both rated on a scale of 0-10 with 0 representing no ability or training and 10 representing the maximum ability possible for a human. A skill roll will typically range from 12-20 for most tasks, so a skill 10 + stat 10 will succeed at virtually any task barring a critical mishap, while a skill 0 + stat 2 (minimum statistic level for a human character) will fail at any but the very simplest task, and even then will succeed only on a critical success. Interlock builds on the typical skill-based paradigm by offering "template" (Mekton) or "profession" (Cyberpunk) packages that give specialized abilities to characters that take these packages.

There are nine Attributes: Intelligence (INT), Reflexes (REF), Cool (COOL), Technical Ability (TECH), Luck (LUCK), Attractiveness (ATT), Movement (MOVE), Empathy (EMP), and Body (BOD). Characters must have a starting Attribute stat minimum of 2 and a system stat maximum of 10. Empathy is important in Cyberpunk and Cybergeneration in particular. Here, it not only controls interpersonal interactions but it also determines how much cyberware you can install. Every piece of cyberware has a Humanity Cost that reduces the character's base Empathy. A rating of "0" or less with a humanity score in the negative means the character has become psychotic and will be played by the game master, unless the character returns to a positive humanity value and can be returned to the player.

The Interlock System is best known for its Lifepath system, a storytelling device used to create character backgrounds without particular direct benefit or drawback to the character, avoiding min-maxing.

== See also ==
- Fuzion
- Mekton
