= Mekton =

Science fiction/mecha role-playing game

- Cover of the first edition
- Designers: Mike Pondsmith
- Publishers: R. Talsorian Games
- Publication: 1984 Mekton (board wargame); 1985 Mekton (role-playing game); 1987 Mekton II; 1994 Mekton Z
- Genres: mecha; space opera
- Systems: Custom (Mekton); Interlock System (Mekton II & Mekton Z)

Mekton is a mecha game franchise published by R. Talsorian Games starting with a board game in 1984, and then several editions of the first mecha role-playing game in North America, the most recent being Mekton Zeta (メクトン Z).

== Contents ==
=== Board wargame ===
The first edition of Mekton is a board wargame simulating combat between giant robots, drawing on Japanese animation for inspiration. "Mekton", the name of the giant robots, is a nod to "mecha".

=== Role-playing game ===
Mekton advanced from a wargame to a role-playing game by adding basic role-playing rules that cover character and robot construction and combat, plus historical background for the world of Algol and an introductory scenario. The rules for giant robot construction are detailed, while the rules of character creation for the pilots who control the robots are sparse.

Mekton II is a complete revision of the original Mekton rules, including expanded character generation and political info on Algol. This version is compatible with the cyberpunk role-playing game published by R. Talsorian, Cyberpunk 2020.

== Official settings ==
- Algol - The default setting for Mekton and Mekton II (as well as Operation: Rimfire and Landstriker), and remains in Mekton Z for legacy purposes. Algol is a long-lost human colony of the Bendar Galactic Empire, where the various factions are locked in a cold war and must deal with an impending ice age and the possible return of their ancient alien enemy, the fearsome Aggendi lizard warriors.
- Mekton Empire - A space opera setting taking hints from Captain Harlock, Gundam and Voltron, set in the distant Bendar Spiral Galaxy. It added rules for playing aliens (including non-humanoids), space combat, psionics and creating new alien creatures.
- Jovian Chronicles - A heavily Gundam-inspired licensed setting created by Dream Pod 9, set in the 23rd Century. This would later become a separate game using Dream Pod 9's Silhouette System.
- Invasion Terra - A Macross-like setting in the future of 2105.
- Imperial Star - Very similar to Mekton Empire but set in the Milky Way Galaxy.
- Starblade Battalion - A Gundam-like setting, set in 2180, the far future of the Cyberpunk 2020 world.

== Publication history ==
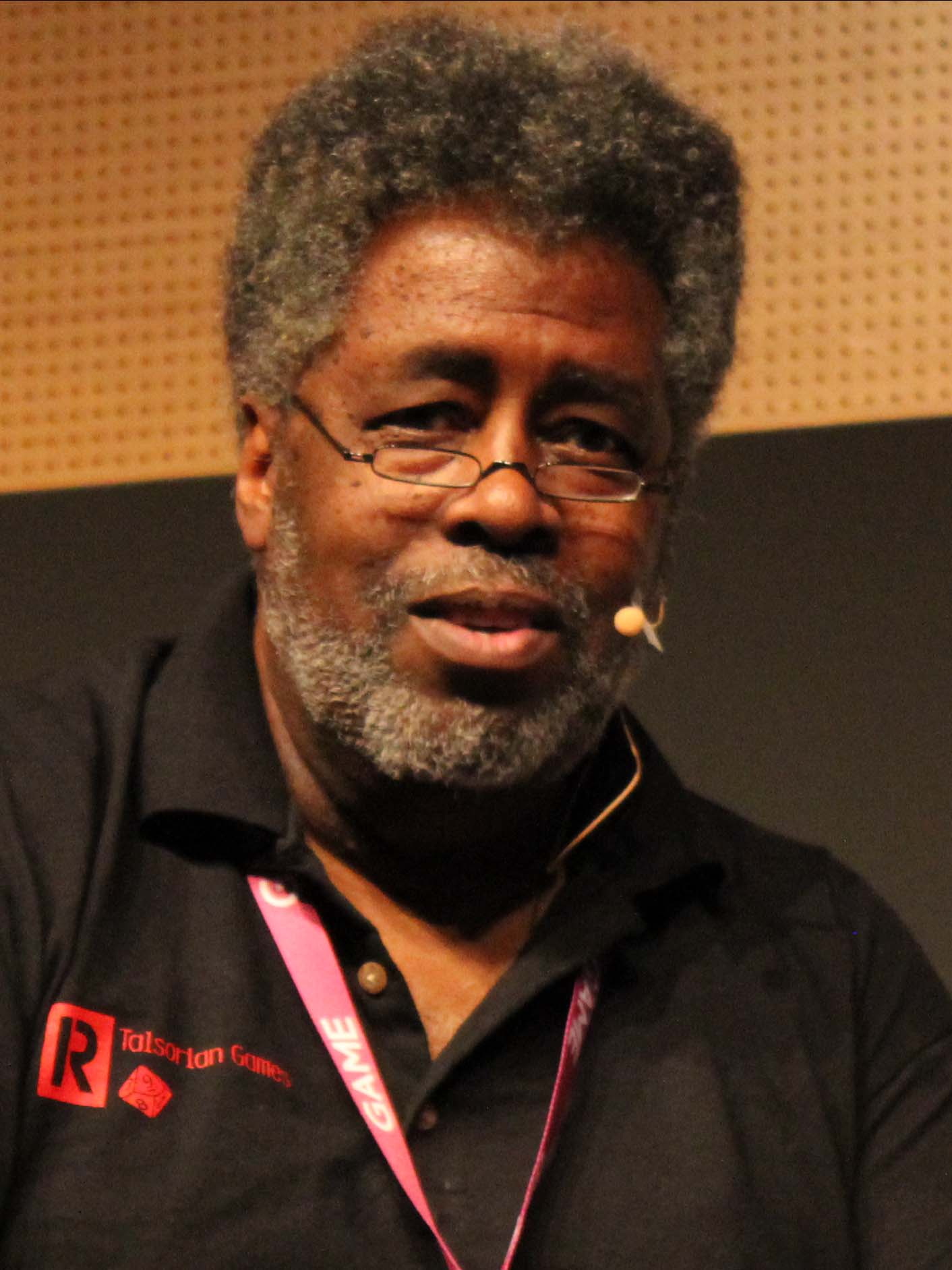
Mike Pondsmith designed Mekton.

Mike Pondsmith became interested in the Mobile Suit Gundam anime and decided to design a board wargame that would combine the mecha genre with the Imperial Star game system that he had designed for his own amusement. Pondsmith, with Mike Jones, designed the wargame Mekton, and self-published the "white box edition" in 1984;the boxed set included a 32-page book, a large color map, two cardstock counter sheets, and dice.

Mekton sold well, and the following year, Pondsmith founded R. Talsorian Games to publish further products. One of the first was a role-playing version of Mekton, released as a 100-page rulebookthat included counters and two maps.

Pondsmith revised and expanded the role-playing elements, and changed the combat and skill resolution system to R. Talsorian's newly created Interlock System; this second edition was released in 1987 as Mekton II,a 96-page book with art by Ben Dunn.

The third edition of the role-playing game, also using the Interlock System, was released as Mekton Zeta in 1994, with cover art by Yuji Maida. A supplement of advanced rules called Mekton Zeta Plus followed in 1995.R. Talsorian published a reprint of that game as the ANimechaniX-branded Mekton Zeta in 2000.

=== Video game ===
A prototype of a video game based on Mekton was developed by Silicon Graphics using Coryphaeus Software's Activation Engine for the IRIX operating system. It was presented at the 1995 SIGGRAPH and bundled on CD-ROMs with other IRIX tech demos.

== Reception ==
In Issue 42 of Abyss, Dave Nalle thought Mekton the role-playing game was "considerably more compact and practical as a game than many of the other entries, and it has a surprisingly high amount of emphasis on role-playing over tactics, despite the fact that the characters are robots, though there are some (very sparse) rules covering human controllers." Nalle noted that if the book ended with only the robot creation and combat rules, it would be a good game. But, "the remaining two-thirds of the book concentrate on the role-playing aspects of the setting and on the characters who pilot the Mekton warriors." Nalle did not like the random aspects of character creation, commenting that it was "a very negative factor in such a game, encouraging players not to think." Nalle concluded, "Mekton is not a perfect game [but it] captures much of the atmosphere and technology of its setting and provides the kind of easily learned, playable presentation of this genre which other better known games fall short of."

In Issue 72 of Space Gamer, Allen Varney commented that "its slick appearance and novel topic will sucker any Japanese-robot fan who can't wait for one of the other robot games due out soon. Pass the word."

Phil Frances reviewed Mekton for White Dwarf #87, and stated that "In all, a most worthwhile effort – not as slick as FASA's Mechwarrior or Battletech, but admirably simple and flexible."

In Issue 79 of Space Gamer/Fantasy Gamer, David Jacobs commented that "Even if you've seen all of the Japanese animation featuring giant robots, I strongly suggest that you at least give it a once-over, because these guys and gals at R. Talsorian Games know how to put together a good game. This reviewer strongly suggests that Mekton is a must for any game shelf."

David Kling reviewed Mekton: The Game of Japanese Robot Combat for Different Worlds magazine and stated that "Basically, Mekton is a decent game. It's got some flimsy rules, but they can be developed by any adept gamemaster."

In his 1990 book The Complete Guide to Role-Playing Games, game critic Rick Swan thought that this game "has more in common with tactical military simulations than RPGs." Swan liked designing the robots, calling the process "fun and simple, easily the most enjoyable part of the game." However, Swan found the character generation rules "the game's weakest feature, apparently included for the sole purpose of generating pilots for the robots ... [the pilots] are essentially irrelevant to the focus of the game." Swan concluded by giving the game a rating of 2.5 out of 4, saying, "It's possible to design a campaign setting from the information provided ... but I'm not sure it's worth the trouble, because it's merely a way to kill time until the next robotic showdown."

In Issue 25 of the Australian games magazine Australian Realms, Mike Bell reviewed Mekton Zeta, and thought that it "really captures the popular appeal of the Manga/Anime genre in both presentation and game play." Bell found the book well-organized, and thought "the overall presentation of the product is crisp and clean; a far cry from the second edition." Bell liked the updated combat system, as well as the compatibility with Cyberpunk 2020. Bell concluded, "Mekton Zeta is a vast improvement on previous editions, and is an essential buy for any roleplayer who enjoys space opare in the highly dramatic anime vein. 'Pilots to your Mektons!'"<rev name=arm />

In the inaugural issue of the game magazine Gateways, Gary Wolfe noted, "All the basic RPG rules you need are here, but there is not too much written on how to create original scenarios. There is a description of a planet and four major societies, but the referee, as in any system, is in for a lot of work."

== Reviews ==
- Comics Feature #36
- Comics Feature #46

== Mekton publications ==
- "White Box" Mekton (1984) - tactical wargame
- Mekton (1985) - softcover book using a custom percentile-based task resolution system. Notable for having misspelled its own name in the katakana.
  - Mekton Advanced Combat System (1986)
  - Roadstriker (1986) - rules for human-scale transformable vehicles and power suit mecha, more advanced transformable mecha design options, and a police drama adventure
- Mekton II (1987) - converted Mekton to run on the Interlock System, later used in Cyberpunk 2020. Cover art by Ben Dunn.
  - Roadstriker II (1990) - rules for human-scale transformable vehicles and power suit mecha, more advanced transformable mecha design options, and a police drama adventure converted to the Mekton II system.
  - Operation Rimfire (ca. 1990) - campaign book. A very Gundam-esque adventure in which representatives of both major political factions on Algol are sent on a long-range interplanetary mission to determine the nature of an anomaly at the edge of the star system. Written to be played as 'episodes' in a 'series'. (Reference was made in this book and the later Mekton Empire that the anomaly was in actuality a nonfunctional stargate such as is used in the Bendarian Empire.)
  - Mekton Techbook/Mekton Technical System (MTB/MTS) (1991) - a major conversion of the mecha-building system of Mekton
  - Mekton Empire - This expansion book reduced the Algol system to just one more star among hundreds in the Bendarian Galactic Empire.
- Mekton Zeta (メクトン Z) (1994) - general update and improvement of Mekton II
  - Mekton Zeta Plus (メクトン Z プラス) (1994) - general update and improvement of the Mekton Techbook
- Gundam Senki (2000) - A licensed Japanese language role-playing game using the Mekton Zeta system, published by T.O.Y International Inc/Aspect.
- Mekton Zero - a crowdfunded project scheduled to be released in 2014 that failed to reach its goals.
