= The Horror Beneath =

The Horror Beneath is a 2001 role-playing game adventure published by Nightshift Games.

== Plot summary ==
The Horror Beneath is an adventure in which 4–6 player characters (levels 3–5), in the World of Vallkan, must uncover a sinister mystery in Scarborough's caves.

== Reviews ==
- Pyramid
- Polyhedron #145
