= Teenagers from Outer Space (role-playing game) =

Tabletop comedy role-playing game

- Teenagers from Outer Space 2nd edition
- Designers: Michael A. Pondsmith
- Publishers: R. Talsorian Games
- Publication: 1987 (1st edition, 84 pages); 1989 (2nd edition, 96 pages); 1997 (3rd edition, 128 pages)
- Genres: Science fiction, comedy
- Systems: custom

Teenagers from Outer Space (often abbreviated TFOS) is a rules-light comedy role-playing game written by Michael A. Pondsmith and published by R. Talsorian Games. It was inspired by gag anime such as Urusei Yatsura and Ranma ½. The game was first released in 1987, when anime was still mostly an underground sensation. The game is currently in its third edition, published in 1997. This edition was retooled to play up the anime inspirations after anime had become more mainstream.

At least two modules were published for the original edition. The first was "Field Trip" written by Dave Friedland and published by R. Talsorian Games. The second was "TFOS does Winterfest", written by Douglas Garrett, Paul Lidberg and Michael MacDonald and published under license by Crunchy Frog Enterprises.

In 2001, A2 Press published a TFOS universe expansion book named "The Landing" which was written by Michael Cox. More expansions were supposed to follow.

In 2020, R. Talsorian Games published a supplement for the game titled "Anglers from Planet X" for April Fools' Day.

== Concept ==
The basic setting of Teenagers from Outer Space revolves around aliens making contact with Earth and becoming infatuated with Earth's "teen culture". So much, in fact, that many aliens move to Earth, and enroll their children in Earth schools. This set the stage for a variety of comedic situations.

The 1986 Chris Columbus created CBS Saturday morning cartoon Galaxy High embodied this concept, but in reverse, where humans attended high school on an asteroid.

== Characters ==
Players take on the role of either (somewhat) ordinary Earth teens (Humans) trying to cope with the "new neighbors", or Alien teens trying to fit in on Earth. There are eight stats, ranging from the relatively normal Bod (overall physical strength and agility) and Smarts (intelligence), to stats like Relationship With Parents (how well the character deals with their parents and other authority figures) and Driving. Skills, or "Knacks", are made up by players, with oddly descriptive names like "Drive Like a Maniac", "Fire Raygun", or "Avoid Being Harassed by Authority Figures" recommended.

A stat called Bonk measures damages, but keeping in the comedic nature of the game, characters only suffer temporary cartoon-style injuries and having Bonk reduced to zero only forces a character to sit out one turn. Bonk can also be lost by being the victim of an embarrassing faux pas or devastating put-down.

Aliens can come in a wide variety of shapes and sizes, but are classified into three basic types:

- Near Humans, who look almost human, except for a few small details (examples include Mr. Spock from Star Trek, or Lum from Urusei Yatsura)
- Not Very Near Humans, who are humanoid but with a lot of odd, obvious features (examples include the Teenage Mutant Ninja Turtles, or the Puma twins from Dominion)
- Real Weirdies, who may or may not be humanoid, and always stand out in a crowd (such as the Xenomorphs from the Alien series, or the aragami from Blue Seed)

This classification system can also be applied to non-human characters who are not necessarily aliens, such as robots and mythological creatures.

Alien Teens frequently have one or more bizarre powers such as flight, the ability to throw lightning bolts or breathe fire, shapeshifting, or psychic powers. Humans start with only one special ability, Fake Out (an uncanny knack for fast-talking greenhorn aliens into believing false information about Earth culture), but may start with advantages like increased running speed or durability, or outrageous wealth.

== Gameplay ==
The rules encourage a lot of improvisational and character-based humor. The "GM's tips" section of the rulebook includes a list of suggested gag situations ("routines") the players will have to deal with on a regular basis, from jealous girlfriends, to drill-sergeant gym teachers, to nosey siblings, to unlikely interruptions for make-out sessions.

== Influence ==
Despite the apparent simplicity of the design, TFOS has turned out to be influential in the development of role-playing games. As the first non-mecha anime-based game to achieve a degree of commercial success, it was pivotal in opening the development of that genre. That and the simplicity of the system were major influences on the development of Big Eyes, Small Mouth. It has been very popular on computer networks and is still frequently used in Internet games.

== Reception ==
In the June/July 1987 edition of Adventurer (Issue #11), James Wallis did not like the game, commenting that "the authors couldn't decide whether they wanted to produce a game like Ghostbusters or Toon, and ended up with the worst of both [...] a game which will, if left to its own devices, degenerate into endless goop-gun duels." He also derided the twenty scenario ideas, saying, "Maybe three of them are useable; the rest are too silly for words; and when I say 'silly' I mean 'stupid'."

Stewart Wieck reviewed Teenagers From Outer Space in White Wolf #9 (1988), rating it a 7 out of 10 and stated that "anyone who enjoyed high school the first time around (or if you think you will when you get there) or even those who didn't enjoy it but want to might consider checking this game out."

In Issue 12 of Gateways, Serge Clermont noted "Teenagers from Outer Space is a game on the lighter side of role-playing that is not specifically aimed at individuals who are already familiar with various role-playing systems." Clermont thought the rules were well-written and could be used to bridge a gap between regular gamers and those new to the hobby. Clermont concluded, "it encourages players to laugh and add a little summer fun into the wintertime. This quality is a breath of fresh air to the market of game systems, and even if you buy it and never play, at least you'll get a good kick out of its contents. Enjoy!"

In the November 1989 edition of the British magazine Games International (Issue 10), Paul Mason warned readers that "This is a stupid game [...] This game only works if the players turn into animals from start to finish and the referee throws all subtlety, intelligence and taste out the window." He concluded by giving the game an average rating of 3 out of 5, saying, "If you like Toon and Ghostbusters, and fancy playing that kind of game in an American high school setting, then Teenagers is great fun."

In his 1990 book The Complete Guide to Role-Playing Games, game critic Rick Swan called this "the nuttiest RPG this side of Toon, a minor classic." Swan concluded by giving this game a solid rating of 3 out of 4, saying it "is hands-down the all-time funniest RPG, but be forewarned it takes an experienced referee to realize its potential."

== Other reviews ==
- Isaac Asimov's Science Fiction Magazine v12 n3 (1988 03)
- InQuest Gamer #34
- Best Games of 1988 in Games #94
