= Castle Falkenstein (role-playing game) =

Tabletop role-playing game

High adventure in the steam age
- Designers: Mike Pondsmith
- Publishers: R. Talsorian Games
- Publication: 1994; 31 years ago
- Genres: Fantasy
- Systems: Custom

Castle Falkenstein is a fantasy role-playing game (RPG) designed by Mike Pondsmith and originally published by R. Talsorian Games in 1994. The game is named for a legendary unbuilt castle in the Bavarian Alps. Players play the roles of gallant adventurers who take on quests of intrigue and derring-do in the spirit of Victorian adventures such as The Prisoner of Zenda.

== Setting ==
The game is set on an alternate earth, in the steampunk era of Victorian "New Europa" circa 1870. In addition to humans, New Europa is populated by creatures from fantasy such as dragons and faeries. Fictional characters such as Van Helsing can also be encountered.

== Original edition ==
The game was designed by Mike Pondsmith and published in 1994 by R. Talsorian Games as a 224-page softcover book. Cover art was by William Eaken and Mark Schumann.

=== System ===
The game does not use statistics or dice to define a character. Instead, players must choose a general template of a hero (Heroic, Tragic, Flawed, Innocent, Clever, or Fallen). The player then chooses an archetypal career from a long list including Anarchist, Diplomat, Dashing Hussar, Mad Scientist, and Steam Engineer. Each archetype comes with a set of possessions and a few "Strong Suits" (aptitudes) and Skills. The player then starts a character diary to record the details of adventures, beginning with the character’s background and present situation.

Players can also choose to play non-human characters such as dragons, faeries and dwarves, but reviewer Rick Swan noted that "they come with so much baggage, they're barely worth the effort."

Skill resolution is done with an ordinary deck of playing cards rather than dice. At the start of the game, each participant, including the referee, is dealt four cards. When a player wants to test a skill, the referee rates the difficulty of the task from 2 to 12. If the character's skill level is higher than the difficulty, the character succeeds. Players can boost a skill level by playing cards from their hands, adding the value of any cards played to the skill level. Likewise, the referee can also increase the difficulty rating by playing their own cards.

Combat operates using the same system.

Spellcasters use a second deck of cards. When the spellcaster wishes to cast a spell, the player must draw cards from the deck, one card per two minutes of game time, until the sum of the cards equals or exceeds the power of the spell. Even then, success is not guaranteed, and a spell can backfire with disastrous consequences.

== Other editions ==
In 2000, Steve Jackson Games published GURPS Castle Falkenstein under license using the GURPS rule system.

In 2016, Fat Goblin Games signed a deal with R. Talsorian Games to produce new supplements for Castle Falkenstein using the original rules system. The first of these supplements, Curious Creatures, appeared in 2016, and additional supplements were subsequently published.

== Reception ==
In the December 1994 edition of Pyramid, Scott Haring admired the tenor of the game, saying, "This is not a game of sullen anti-heroes, angst and moral dilemmas; this is a grand game of world-spanning plots, pure heroes and diabolical villains. [Designer Mike] Pondsmith has done a great job of setting the stage for grand dramatic battles between good and evil without once letting it descend into melodrama or parody. This is a game that believes in itself and its premise 100%, but without drowning in pretentiousness or self-importance." Haring concluded, "Castle Falkenstein is a breath of fresh air in roleplaying, a game where real heroes matter and don’t have to apologize. The book is physically gorgeous, the game mechanics fit the tone of the game world like a glove, the writing is wonderful, and the game world is enchanting."

In the November–December 1994 edition of Shadis (Issue 16), Ken Cox called this "what has to be one of the most exciting games in the industry." Cox complimented the presentation, commenting, "With its incredible artwork and layout the book fairly transports you into the realms of the world, while not taking away from the exchange of information." He concluded with a strong recommendation, saying, "A sure-fire system with a fantastic world of adventure: isn't that just what we all have been looking for?"

Rich Warren reviewed Castle Falkenstein in White Wolf Inphobia #51 (Jan., 1995), rating it a 4 out of 5 and stated that "Perhaps it's personal preference, but this stereotyping is the only aspect of the game that I actively dislike. Admittedly, it's a problem that can be overcome. Given the game's several good point, I give it four stars."

In the February 1995 edition of Dragon (Issue 214), Rick Swan was enthusiastic about the game, calling it "an alternative reality that’s one part fact, ten parts fun house... a crazy quilt of steam-age technology and social anarchy." He recommended the game, saying, "This is about as good as it gets."

In a 1996 reader poll conducted by the British game magazine Arcane to determine the 50 most popular role-playing games of all time, Castle Falkenstein was ranked 45th. Editor Paul Pettengale commented: "Castle Falkenstein is one of those games that people tend to either love or hate. It has a unique atmosphere, combining alternate history, Celtic mythology, steampunk and a somewhat whimsical, fairy-tale feel. Likewise, the rulebook itself is quite different from many, being laid out as a novel, with important information pulled out in sidebars, and the rules coming later. This reflects the main thrust of the system, which is heavily geared towards roleplaying and storytelling over game mechanics and numbers, and drops dice in favour of a couple of packs of playing cards."

In his 2023 book Monsters, Aliens, and Holes in the Ground, RPG historian Stu Horvath noted, "Here be dragons, high adventure, and clear lines between good and evil. In [the 1990s,] a grim and gritty decade of moral dilemmas ... Falkenstein is a startling (and perhaps lone) splash of bright, uncomplicated color." Horvath concluded, "The relatively simple card-based system allows the game to focus on its world and its narrative themes, which ... wind up being some of the few bright and sunny patches in a gritty decade of overcast skies and steady drizzles."

== Awards ==
- Best Roleplaying Rules of 1994 Origins Award, Castle Falkenstein, R. Talsorian Games, Mike Pondsmith
- Best Role-Playing Product of 1995 Nigel D. Findley Memorial Award, Castle Falkenstein
