= Cyberpunk (role-playing game) =

Tabletop science fiction role-playing game

The Roleplaying Game of the Dark Future
- Cyberpunk 2020 version 2.00 cover
- Designers: Mike Pondsmith
- Publishers: R. Talsorian Games
- Publication: 1988 (Cyberpunk 2013, first edition); 1990 (Cyberpunk 2020); 2005 (Cyberpunk V3.0); 2020 (Cyberpunk Red)
- Genres: Science fiction role-playing game, cyberpunk
- Systems: Interlock System; Fuzion
- Website: rtalsoriangames.com

Cyberpunk is a tabletop role-playing game in the dystopian science fiction genre, written by Mike Pondsmith and first published by R. Talsorian Games in 1988. It is typically referred to by its second or fourth edition names, Cyberpunk 2020 and Cyberpunk Red, in order to distinguish it from the cyberpunk genre after which it is named.

In Cyberpunk, players take on the roles of edgerunners: mercenaries, hackers, criminals, and other individuals living on the fringes of society who undertake dangerous jobs on the streets of a dystopian future. Set in a world dominated by megacorporations and marked by urban violence, social inequality, and rapid technological advancement, the game follows these characters as they struggle for money, power, fame, and survival. The game gained wider mainstream recognition through its video game adaptation, Cyberpunk 2077, developed by CD Projekt Red and released in 2020.

== History ==
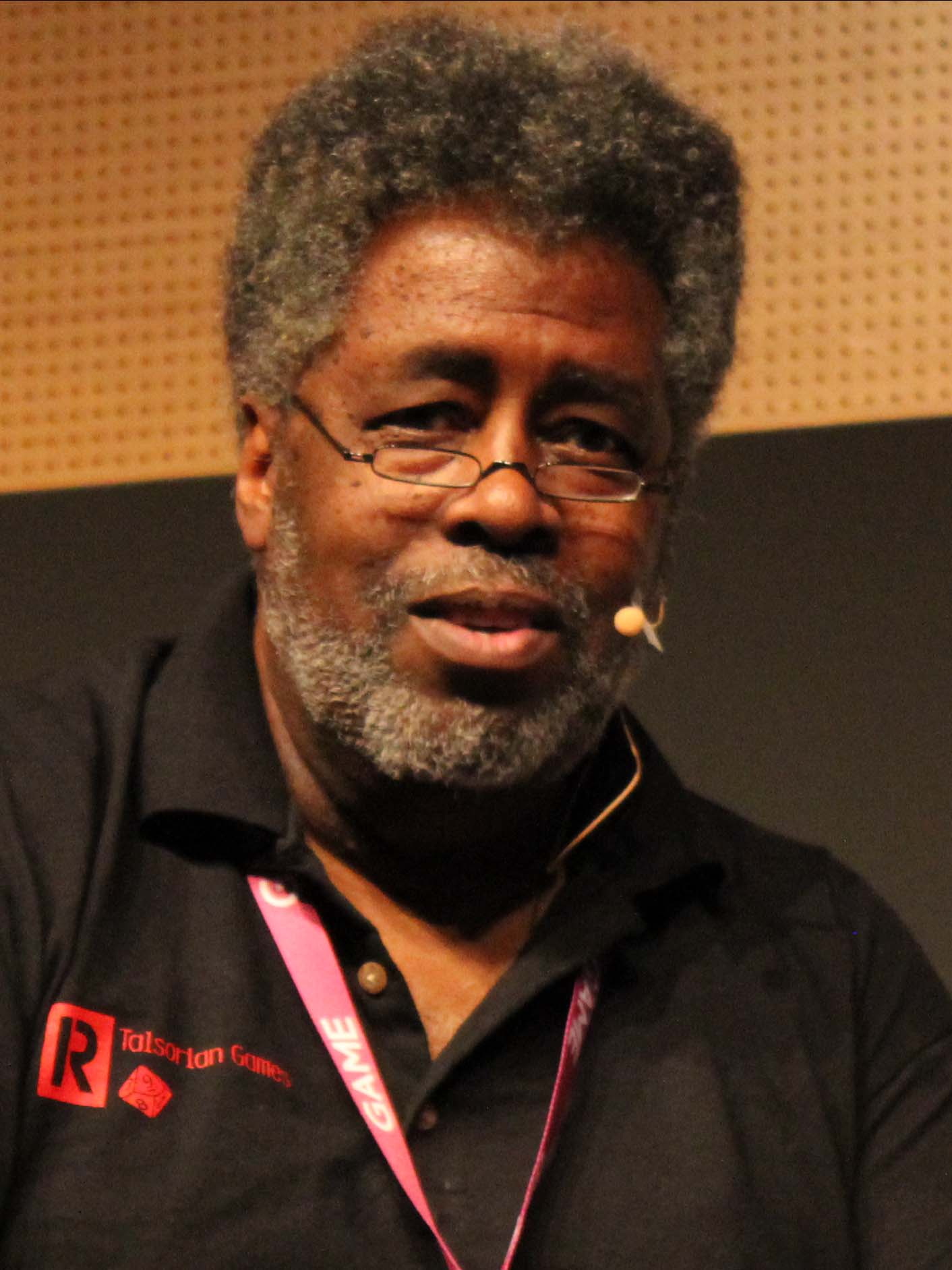
The game was designed by Mike Pondsmith (pictured in 2017).

Cyberpunk was designed by Mike Pondsmith as an attempt to replicate the gritty realism of 1980s cyberpunk science fiction. In particular, Walter Jon Williams' novel Hardwired was an inspiration, and Williams helped playtest the game. Another key influence was the film Blade Runner. Many also assume William Gibson's Neuromancer was an influence; however, Pondsmith did not read the novel until a later date. Other sources included the film Streets of Fire and the anime Bubblegum Crisis.

=== First edition ===
The original version of Cyberpunk was published in 1988 by R. Talsorian Games. The game components of the boxed set consist of a 44-page Handbook, a 38-page Sourcebook, a 20-page Combat Book, four pages of game aids and two ten-sided dice.

A number of rules supplements were subsequently published in 1989:

- Rockerboy (sourcebook for the Rockerboy character class)
- Solo of Fortune (sourcebook for the Solo character class)
- Hardwired
- Near Orbit: Space Supplement (with rules for space travel)

This edition of the game retroactively became known as Cyberpunk 2013.

=== Second edition: Cyberpunk 2020 ===
In 1990, R. Talsorian Games released the second edition of the game, titled Cyberpunk 2020, which featured updated rules for combat, Netrunning, and character generation. The game's timeline was also retconned to accommodate the German reunification in 1990. It was released as a boxed set that contained a 222-page softcover book, and a 24-page reference guide and adventure.

R. Talsorian Games released two revised versions: Cyberpunk 2020 version 2.00 (1992), and Cyberpunk 2020 version 2.01 (1993).

A total of 28 rules supplements and sourcebooks, and 6 adventures were also published by R. Talsorian Games between 1993 and 1996. In addition, Atlas Games published twelve adventures under license between 1991 and 1994.

Dream Pod 9 released Night's Edge in 1992, taking the Cyberpunk 2020 setting and adding a horror theme, including vampires and werewolves. Dream Pod 9 published ten other supplements and adventures in this setting between 1992 and 1995.

An alternate world sourcebook, Cybergeneration, was published in 1993; it centers around teenagers with unusual, superhuman skills gained from a nanotech virus epidemic. The first version of Cybergeneration required the Cyberpunk 2020 rulebook, but a second version became a standalone game.

Two Cyberpunk 2020 novels were published, in 1995 and 1996.

In 1997, the game was published by the Copernicus corporation in Polish.

=== Third edition: Cyberpunk V3.0 ===
Cyberpunk V3.0 is set in the 2030s and was published in 2005. It takes Cyberpunk into a transhumanist setting in the aftermath of a fourth Corporate War. The global NET has been corrupted and rendered unusable, as has much hardcopied data, throwing human history into doubt. Six new subcultures have emerged, known as Altcults; one such group are the Edgerunners, successors to the cyberpunks of previous editions.

The third edition uses the Fuzion game system, rather than Interlock. The artwork in the book used photographs of action figures and toys instead of hand-drawn art like in previous editions. Both the change of setting and the artwork within the book received negative criticism — resulting in Cyberpunk V3.0 not being canonical to the main series.

From 2007 to 2008, two sourcebooks were published to accompany this edition.

=== Fourth edition: Cyberpunk Red ===
The fourth edition of Cyberpunk, titled Cyberpunk Red, is set in 2045, following the events of Cyberpunk 2020 and serving as a prequel to the video game Cyberpunk 2077 by CD Projekt Red. The game is set after a fourth Corporate War; however, the events differ from Cyberpunk V3.0, which is considered to be a separate timeline.

The Cyberpunk Red core rulebook was released in November 2020. It was preceded by the release of a simplified boxed set, known as the Cyberpunk Red Jumpstart Kit, at Gen Con in August 2019. The core rulebook was delayed from a planned release alongside the Jumpstart Kit, initially to allow Cyberpunk Red game lore to be better aligned with Cyberpunk 2077, and later due to the COVID-19 pandemic.

In June 2024, R. Talsorian released Cyberpunk Edgerunners Mission Kit based on the Cyberpunk: Edgerunners anime series, itself based on the Cyberpunk 2077 video game. The missions use the existing Cyberpunk RED tabletop roleplaying game engine. The sourcebook began development in response to the popularity of game mods created for the video game. The new set takes place in the 2077 timeline, with R. Talsorian announcing plans to continue making content for the 2045 setting.

At Gen Con 2025, R. Talsorian announced the Single Player Mode expansion for Cyberpunk RED, as well as a Night City 2045 sourcebook. Single Player Mode was released in September 2025, providing an official way to run Cyberpunk RED as a solo role-playing game.

== Setting ==
Location of Morro Bay, the real life location of Night City, which is the main setting of the Cyberpunk series

Cyberpunk exists within its own fictional timeline, which splits from the real world in the 1980s. The timeline has been extended with each major edition of the game, from the first edition set in 2013 to Cyberpunk Red set in 2045.

The main location of Cyberpunk is the fictional Night City, situated on the West Coast of the United States, where the real life city of Morro Bay is located. With a population of five million, it presents a stratified society of gang warfare, corporate rivalries, and political machinations in which the players must survive.

The backstory for Cyberpunk begins with the United States becoming embroiled in a major conflict in Central America in the 1980s. This conflict ends in a military coup and causes a significant economic collapse. As a result, the Soviet Union is itself preserved from collapse, and the European Common Market and Japan emerge as global superpowers. In tandem with economic collapse, other disasters have wreaked havoc across the globe, including food blights and devastating famines, as well as the destruction of entire regions of land as a consequence of war. By the late 1990s, the Middle East has become a radioactive desert in the fallout of nuclear conflict.

With the lack of government and police enforcement due to the Central American wars and subsequent economic collapse, casual violence has become endemic in many parts of the world. At the same time, megacorporations have risen to power and fight amongst themselves for dominance, and orbital habitats have begun to develop and form into independent states, both causes and symptoms of the increasing fracturing of civilization. Bioengineering, against a backdrop of warfare, has resulted in the rapid development of cybernetic prosthetics and direct human-machine interfaces, and many now suffer from "technoshock", an inability to cope with a world of synthetic muscle tissue, organic circuits, and designer drugs.

== System ==
The rules of Cyberpunk are built on R. Talsorian's Interlock system. A core game mechanic is the concept of Difficulty Values, used to gauge whether a player succeeds or fails at any given task. A player takes the value of their most appropriate character attribute, adds the values of any relevant skills or modifiers, and then finally adds the value of a ten-sided die roll. In order to succeed, they must beat the Difficulty Value assigned to the task by the gamemaster. Cyberpunk was one of the first tabletop games to use this concept.

=== Character creation ===
As cyberpunks, the players embrace body modification, cybertech and bioengineering. They live by four tenets:

1. Style over substance.
2. Attitude is everything.
3. Always take it to the Edge.
4. (Break) the rules.

There are ten key roles, each with their own special abilities. These include charismatic musicians ('rockerboys'), bodyguards and assassins ('solos'), computer hackers ('netrunners'), road warriors ('nomads'), street experts ('fixers'), investigative journalists and reporters ('medias'), mechanics ('techs' or 'techies'), doctors ('medtechs'), corporate executives ('corpos'), and police officers ('lawmen').

A choice of rules are provided for character creation, either by assigning points to purchase skills or by rolling d10s for a more random outcome. A system called Lifepath is provided to develop each character further, by generating goals, motivations, and events from their past. Finally, they gain money, cyberware, weapons and other equipment, including fashion and lifestyle goods.

Further character development is skill-based rather than level-based; for successful play, players are awarded points to be spent on improving their characters' skill sets.

=== Combat ===
The combat system is called Friday Night Firefight (FNFF), and emphasizes lethality. Unlike role-playing systems where characters amass hit points as they progress, allowing them to survive higher amounts of combat damage, the amount of damage a character can sustain in Cyberpunk does not generally increase as the character develops.

Each round, characters are permitted to take one move action and one other action. There are rules governing the use of autofire, armor, and cover, including specific instructions for using people as shields. Alternative ammunition types for weapons are available, for example a shotgun can be fired with buckshot instead of slugs. Character skills can be used to improve both ranged and melee combat.

Additionally, there are rules covering other forms of damage such as drowning and asphyxiation, electrocution, and being set on fire.

=== Netrunning ===
There are also rules for cybernetic hacking, called Netrunning. When characters "jack in", they can interpret the NET in several different ways, including as a classic Dungeons & Dragons maze, or perhaps as a star-filled galaxy.

Netrunners engage in the virtual world with interface plugs, cyberdecks, and the Interface special ability. Cyberdecks include slots to contain Programs, selected ahead of time by Netrunners to assist in tasks such as evasion, decryption and detection. Combat and other actions in the NET are fast, taking place second-by-second, as opposed to three second combat rounds in the physical world.

The destruction of the global NET in later editions of Cyberpunk turns the attention of Netrunners to local private networks. The effect on gameplay is that Netrunning is no longer a remote activity; Netrunners are embedded within their team and, with equipment such as virtuality goggles, can alternate their actions between both physical and virtual space. Closer integration with other activities was a game design choice to ensure all characters have a part to play during a hacking scene.

=== Empathy and cyberpsychosis ===
The acquisition of cyberware—cyberweapons, cyberoptics and other implants—carries a Humanity Cost. Every ten points of Humanity Cost causes the loss of an Empathy point, the character attribute that measures how well they relate to other people. An Empathy level of zero represents a complete loss of humanity, a state known as cyberpsychosis; in the case of players, their character becomes a non-player character controlled by the gamemaster.

== Other media ==
=== Anime ===
Cyberpunk: Edgerunners is an ONA set in the Cyberpunk universe produced by CD Projekt Red and Studio Trigger for Netflix. A tie-in to CD Projekt Red's Cyberpunk 2077, it was released in September 2022.

A standalone sequel series, Cyberpunk: Edgerunners 2, was announced in July 2025 and premiered on Netflix on October 20, 2026. The second series consists of ten episodes and features a new cast of characters in a story set in Night City. It was directed by Kai Ikarashi, with Bartosz Sztybor serving as showrunner, writer, and producer.

=== Collectible card games ===
Three different, independent collectible card games have been licensed and produced based on the Cyberpunk setting. The first, called Netrunner, was designed by Richard Garfield and released by Wizards of the Coast in 1996 (the game was re-released as Android: Netrunner in 2012, but was no longer associated with the Cyberpunk universe). The second, Cyberpunk CCG, was designed by Peter Wacks and published by Social Games in 2003. The third, Cyberpunk Legends, was designed by James Portnow and is slated for publication by Night Crew Games in 2026. Cyberpunk Legends differs from its predecessors in that it is a cooperative game for 1–4 players.

=== Miniature game ===
Cyberpunk Red: Combat Zone is a tabletop miniature wargame by R. Talsorian Games and Monster Fight Club, released in 2023.

=== Video games ===
- In 2007, Mayhem Studio released the 2D platformer Cyberpunk: The Arasaka's Plot for the J2ME platform.
- In 2020, CD Projekt RED, the developer of The Witcher series, released the open world action role-playing game Cyberpunk 2077.
- Cyberpunk 2077 Chrome Rush. A motorcycle racing arcade cabinet set in the released in 2025.
- Cyberpunk 2077 Turf Wars. An arcade shooting gallery title released alongside Chrome Rush in 2025.
- Cyberpunk 2077 x Zero Latency VR. In 2026, Zero latency announced a Cyberpunk 2077 themed game to their location based VR arena’s.

=== Novel ===
- Kosik, Rafal (2023). Cyberpunk 2077: No Coincidence. New York, NY: Orbit. ISBN 978-0-7595-5595-2.

=== Comics ===
- Bunn, Cullen (March 30, 2021). Cyberpunk 2077: Trauma Team. Dark Horse Comics. ISBN 978-1-5067-1601-5.
- Sztybor, Bartosz (October 26, 2021). Cyberpunk 2077: Where's Johnny. Dark Horse Comics. ISBN 978-1-5067-2625-0.
- Motyka, Aleksandra; Blacha, Marcin (July 6, 2021). Cyberpunk 2077: Your Voice. Milwaukie, OR: Dark Horse Comics. ISBN 978-1-5067-2623-6.
- Sztybor, Bartosz (March 21, 2023). Cyberpunk 2077: You Have My Word. Dark Horse Comics. ISBN 978-1-5067-2566-6.
- Sztybor, Bartosz (February 8, 2022). Cyberpunk 2077: Big City Dreams. Milwaukie, OR: Dark Horse Comics. ISBN 978-1-5067-2686-1.
- Sztybor, Bartosz (January 31, 2023). Cyberpunk 2077: Blackout. Dark Horse Comics. ISBN 978-1-5067-2627-4.
- Sztybor, Bartosz (July 16, 2024). Cyberpunk 2077: XOXO. Dark Horse Comics. ISBN 978-1-5067-2711-0.
- Sztybor, Bartosz (December 13, 2024). Cyberpunk Edgerunners: Madness
- Ludkowski, Łukasz; Sutton, Alex; Sztybor, Bartosz (2023). Cyberpunk 2077: Ten of Swords. Dark Horse Comics.

== Reception ==
Reviews of Cyberpunk were mixed with Julia Martin for Issue 37 of Challenge, commenting "the game has style. While it is a game with some ragged edges, Cyberpunk recreates the atmosphere of the literature and movies from which it draws admirably." Martin had issues with the combat system, especially the organization of the rules, some ambiguous rules, and the lack of super-advanced weaponry. She also commented on the number of typos, noting, "Quite frankly, I don't think I've seen this many apparently careless, minor errors since Judges Guild went defunct some years ago." She also found the netrunning system far too general. Despite all these problems, she confessed, "I really like this game. It has lots of problems, [...] but it has a great many redeeming points also. [...] The characters and the world view are the heart of Cyberpunk, and they are the best of it." She concluded, "It is a marvelous creature which can be molded into a tremendous campaign by a referee with experience. It is definitely worth the money (and you might even like the combat system). Go check it out."

In Issue 11 of Gateways, Ian Harac commented, "This game seems to meet most of the requirements for a good role-playing game, and is an excellent interpretation of the Cyberpunk genre." Harac concluded, "if you like gritty role-playing that mixes hyperrealism with flights of pure fantasy, this game might be for you. It is well produced, clearly written, and a lot of fun."

Stewart Wieck reviewed Cyberpunk for White Wolf #14, rating it 3 overall, and stated that "Cyberpunk is a fine game set in an environment which is very conducive to role-playing."

In the May 1989 edition of Games International (Issue 5), Paul Mason found the rules disorganized and lacked an index. He also found lots of typos, "the sign of a rushed production." Although Mason found the concept behind the game "quite appealing," he thought that the combat system, which was supposed to be an improvement on the usual non-descriptive hit point system, was too constricted by data tables to be very descriptive. He concluded by giving this game an average rating of 3 out of 5, saying, "All in all, Cyberpunk does the job. If you want to run a game in this genre and you want a single source of rules and background, then this game will be adequate to the task [...] It doesn't contain any ideas radically new to rolegaming, however, and so won't be much use to anyone else except inveterate collectors."

In the September 1989 edition of Dragon (Issue 149), Jim Bambra liked the production values of the original edition, but found many typos in the various books as well as a missing encounter table. Bambra found the setting "does a superb job of capturing the flavor and atmosphere of a disturbingly plausible and realistic future. The development and presentation of the Net is stunning and can be used as a basis for countless numbers of adventures. No other game has succeeded in portraying computer hacking in such a vibrant and absorbing way." He concluded that this was not for everyone: "Gamers brought up on heroic-fantasy or shiny science-fiction games may find the gritty realism of the Cyberpunk game not to their liking... To decide if this is the game for you, read a few of the Cyberpunk style novels. If you like them, don't waste any time — rush out and buy the Cyberpunk game. Welcome to life on the edge."

In his 1990 book The Complete Guide to Role-Playing Games, game critic Rick Swan commented that this game "remains the purist's choice, the RPG most successfully capturing the genre's grim atmosphere." He found that "Combat is chart-heavy but playable, and extremely dangerous for player characters; one well-placed shot is all that it takes to wipe out a careless Nomad." Swan concluded by giving the game a rating of 3 out of 4, saying, "Cyberpunk's gritty realism may not be everyone's idea of a good time; characters tends to lead short, intense lives, flashy heroics are in short supply, and cynicism abounds. A terrific game for pessimists."

Stewart Wieck reviewed the second edition of Cyberpunk 2020 in White Wolf #24 (Dec./Jan. 1990), rating it a 4 out of 5 and stated that "A definite improvement over the first edition, Cyberpunk 2020 revamps the first cyberpunk genre game and deserves the attention of all cyberpunk genre gamers."

In the September 1992 edition of Dragon (Issue 185), Allen Varney found Cyberpunk 2020 just as stylish as its first-edition predecessor, but he found even more typos in this edition than in the first edition. Varney liked the new streamlined combat system, but criticized the duality of modern combat, where "unarmored characters become pools of blood in 10 seconds of combat, but those in flak armor can shrug off submachine-gun fire." Varney also felt that the Netrunning system was much improved, calling the rules system "elegant and original." Varney thought the second edition's biggest flaw was lack of an index, but he also criticized the dichotomy of a system where "you can break into Eurobank and embezzle five million bucks, but you better pay your phone bill on time or you're in big trouble." He accused the game of being "in the curious position of advocating rebellion, but only in socially acceptable ways." Nonetheless, Varney concluded that "The Cyberpunk game's second edition surpasses its first edition on every count. With its smooth action, 'pure' cyberpunk atmosphere, easily accessible setting, and medium-low complexity, this game tops my list as the field's best route to dark near-future adventure."

In a 1996 reader poll undertaken by Arcane magazine to determine the 50 most popular roleplaying games of all time, Cyberpunk was ranked 10th. Editor Paul Pettengale commented: "Cyberpunk was the first of the 'straight' cyberpunk RPGs, and is still the best. The difference between cyberpunk and other sci-fi is a matter of style and attitude. Everything about the Cyberpunk game, from the background to the rules system, is designed to create this vital atmosphere. Cyberpunk is set in an unforgiving world where betrayal and double-crosses are common, trust is hard to find and paranoia is a useful survival trait."

In November 2020, Forbes found Cyberpunk Red to be a consistent continuation of the themes from Cyberpunk 2020. Contributor Rob Wieland praised the system for character generation, stating, "One of the signature elements of the game, lifepaths, went through a great refinement. Lifepath is a chart where players roll to determine elements of their character's history. It creates lovers, friends, rivals and more for GMs to hang plot hooks on. Cyberpunk thrives on the personal connections between characters. Lifepath makes player buy-in easier; players are going to be much more interested in a job given to them by an old flame than a random NPC."

In his 2023 book Monsters, Aliens, and Holes in the Ground, RPG historian Stu Horvath noted this game's influence on the genre, saying, "The moral ambiguity introduced here eventually becomes a significant part of the language of urban science fiction and fantasy, paving the way for games like Shadowrun, Nightlife, Vampire: The Masquerade, Unknown Armies, and more in the edgy '90s."

Other reviews:

- Świat Gier Komputerowych #54

== See also ==
- List of Cyberpunk 2020 books
- Cyberspace – 1989 Dystopian near-future role-playing game
- GURPS Cyberpunk – 1990 supplement for the GURPS role-playing game
- Starblade Battalion – 1996 Mekton role-playing game supplement

== Sources ==
- Pondsmith, Michael (1993). Cyberpunk, the Roleplaying Game of the Dark Future. R Talsorian Games. ISBN 0-937279-13-7.
- Moss, Will; Pondsmith, Mike; Pondsmith, Lisa (2005). Cyberpunk v3.0. R. Talsorian. ISBN 1-891933-03-5.
