= R. Talsorian Games =

Role-playing game book and accessory publisher

- Industry: Role-playing games
- Founded: 1985; 40 years ago
- Founder: Mike Pondsmith
- Headquarters: Kirkland, Washington, United States
- Website: rtalsoriangames.com

R. Talsorian Games (RTG) is a designer and publisher of role-playing game books and accessories. Originally based in Berkeley, California, the company was moved to Renton, Washington, in 1997. Their titles include the Cyberpunk series and several anime-related RPG titles. Their major product line today is the Fuzion system.

The company's chairman is Mike Pondsmith, usually known as "Maximum Mike" by players, R. Talsorian Games, and members of their online bulletin board.

Products include Cyberpunk 2020, Mekton Zeta (an anime RPG), Castle Falkenstein (a Sorcery and steampunk RPG), The Witcher: Role-Playing Game (based on a fantasy series based on novels by Andrzej Sapkowski and video games by CD Projekt Red), Teenagers from Outer Space (an anime universal setting, the first generic anime RPG until the creation of Big Eyes, Small Mouth using the Tri-Stat system) and several RPGS based on anime such as Bubblegum Crisis, Armored Trooper Votoms and Dragonball Z. They also produced the short-lived Dream Park RPG based on the setting of the Dream Park novels.

== History ==
The success of his small-press published game Mekton convinced Mike Pondsmith that he would be able to make a business by designing games, so he founded R. Talsorian Games in 1985, and using this new company he published a second edition of Mekton (1986). The company's second game was Teenagers from Outer Space (1987). The third published edition of Mekton was called Mekton II (1987) and was the company's first game to use their full-fledged Interlock System. Pondsmith's next game, Cyberpunk 2013 (1988), was R. Talsorian's second design to use the Interlock game system.

R. Talsorian was one of the first RPG publishers to embrace desktop publishing. Its first desktop published books were Mekton II in 1987, which looked much different from products that R. Talsorian would be putting out just a few years later (such as Cyberpunk 2020 (1989)). Cyberpunk became wildly popular and received most of the company's attention for much of the rest of its lifespan.

After an eight-year hiatus that began with its withdrawal from GenCon in 1998 over a conflict regarding floor space and dealer space, the company began a semi-regular publishing schedule again in 2006. Despite its "major" lines being on hiatus during that period, RTG still supported three licensed anime RPG lines (Bubblegum Crisis, Armored Trooper VOTOMS and Dragonball Z) through its ANimechaniX label and occasionally issued reprints for Mekton Z and Cyberpunk 2020.

On January 4, 2006, R. Talsorian Games founded their first demo team, The Chrome Berets. The Chrome Berets were founded and are supervised by David "Knighthawk" Simpson, creator of Knighthawk’s Cyberpunk Archive, a popular fan site for the game. The purpose of The Chrome Berets is to promote the company and products and playtest upcoming products.
