= 2003 in games =

This page lists board and card games, wargames, miniatures games, and tabletop role-playing games published in 2003. For video games, see 2003 in video gaming.

== Games released or invented in 2003 ==
- .hack//ENEMY
- Alhambra
- Amun-Re
- Attack!
- Beyblade Trading Card Game
- Carcassonne: The Castle
- Coloretto
- Crimson Skies
- Dead Inside (role-playing game)
- Deliria (role-playing game)
- Diana: Warrior Princess (role-playing game)
- Diceland - Extra Space
- Diceland - Ogre
- Diceland - Space
- Don't Quote Me
- Dungeons & Dragons Miniatures Game
- EABA (role-playing game system)
- Epic Armageddon
- FATE (role-playing game system)
- A Game of Thrones (board game)
- Ghettopoly
- The Great Pacific War
- Gunfight in the Valley of Tears, October 9, 1973
- The HellGame
- Hex Hex
- Horus Heresy
- Huzzah!
- Inou Tsukai (role-playing game)
- Lunar Rails
- Mare Nostrum
- Marvel Universe Roleplaying Game
- Munchkin Fu
- My Life with Master (role-playing game)
- Neopets Trading Card Game
- Neuroshima (role-playing game)
- Ninja Burger
- No Middle Ground
- One False Step for Mankind
- Orpheus (role-playing game)
- Ophidian 2350
- Panzer Grenadier: Edelweiss
- Panzer Grenadier: Semper Fi! Guadalcanal
- Rag'narok
- Savage Worlds
- Spycraft (role-playing game)
- Stargate SG-1 Roleplaying Game
- Stoner Fluxx
- Strange Synergy
- The Testimony of Jacob Hollow
- The Kids of Catan
- TimeLords (CORPS and EABA versions of the role-playing game)
- Vanished Planet
- Warcraft: The Roleplaying Game
- WarCry
- WARMACHINE
- YINSH
- Yu Yu Hakusho Trading Card Game
- Zendo

== Game awards given in 2003 ==
- International Gamers Award: Hammer of the Scots
- Origins Vanguard Award 2002: Diceland
- Spiel des Jahres: Alhambra
- Games: New England

== Significant game-related events in 2003 ==
- Games magazine selected Magic: The Gathering for induction into its Hall of Fame.
- Chris Moneymaker won a US$2.5 million prize in the World Series of Poker.

== Deaths ==
Date	Name	Age	Notability
February 10	Paul Randles	37	Board and card game designer
May 25	Richard A. Gardner	72	Child psychiatrist who also designed board games
August 5	Don Turnbull	66	RPG designer, known for work with TSR, UK
November 12	John Tartaglione	82	Comics artist and illustrator on The Price of Freedom

== See also ==
- 2003 in video gaming
