= Adventure Pack 1 =

Adventure Pack #1 is a 1987 role-playing game adventure published by Blacksburg Tactical Research Center for TimeLords.

== Plot summary ==
Adventure Pack #1 is an adventure in which scenario Pack "TS-01" presents a trio of compact introductory adventures set across distinct historical and contemporary eras—ancient, medieval, and modern. Each scenario incorporates unique weapons, fantastical or time-appropriate creatures, and vehicles suited to its respective setting. The pack also supplies supporting materials, including maps and ready-to-use non-player characters.

== Publication history ==
Adventure Pack #1 was written by Greg Porter and Roger Campbell with art by Thomas Darrell Midgette and was published by Blacksburg Tactical Research Center in 1988 as a 24-page book.
