= Avengers (TimeLords) =

Avengers is a 1988 role-playing game supplement published by Blacksburg Tactical Research Center for TimeLords.

== Contents ==
Avengers is a supplement in which the setting is the bleak future of the year 2212, this campaign setting unfolds on a devastated Earth where a sinister force known as the Black Death has wreaked global havoc. Against this backdrop, a small yet resolute rebel faction called the Avengers rises to challenge the oppressive organization.

== Publication history ==
Avengers was written by Greg Porter with a cover by Thomas Darrell Midgette and was published by Blacksburg Tactical Research Center in 1988 as a 24-page book.
