= Deathwind =

Deathwind is a 1991 role-playing adventure for CORPS published by Blacksburg Tactical Research Center.

== Plot summary ==
Deathwind is a supplement in which the series of adventures are given in five parts, with a close look at the in-game organization known as “The Hierarchy”.

== Publication history ==
Deathwind was the first campaign and adventure supplement released for CORPS.

== Reception ==
Jim Foster reviewed Deathwind in White Wolf #31 (May/June 1992), rating it a 4 out of 5 and stated that "overall, I was favorably impressed by this latest addition to Corps. It is well worth the purchase price, presenting some highly original ideas in a well developed and presented package. I am looking forward to further releases in this line."
