= Black Death (game) =

Black Death is a board game for 2–6 players that was published by Blacksburg Tactical Research Center in 1993.

== Gameplay ==
Black Death, designed by Greg Porter, is a game in which players are diseases sweeping across medieval Europe in 1347.

The game components are:

- a board with a stylized map of the trade routes in medieval Europe
- a 3-page rulebook
- punch-out cardboard counters
- a deck of Event cards
- two 6-sided dice

Each player either takes the role of a historical plague (measles, dysentery, etc.), or designs a new disease. Each disease has a Virulence rating and a Mortality rating between 1 and 5, which together add up to 6.

Players then try to move across the map of Europe, infecting as many population centers as possible. Random event cards can help or hinder each player.

=== Victory conditions ===
The first player to reach an agreed-upon number of victims is the winner. The rules suggest that this number be:

- For 2 players: 30 million victims
- For 3–4 players: 20 million victims
- For 5–6 players: 15 million victims

=== Variants ===
There are also four variants:

- Fast game: Diseases have a combined Virulence and Mortality of 7 rather than 6.
- Slow game: Virulence and Mortality have a combined score of 5.
- Mutations: At certain points of the game, the virulence and mortality of diseases might increase or decrease
- 1665: The game is set in Germany in 1665, and uses a variant board of German cities.

== Reception ==
In the October 1993 edition of Dragon (Issue #198), Rick Swan called the game's premise "bizarre", and felt that, with relatively few rules, the game "walks a fine line between being simple and simple-minded". He concluded that the game was unlikely to be a good candidate for the long term, "But for the first few plays anyway, the fun is, er, contagious."

== Reviews ==
- Review in Shadis #9
- Pyramid
