= EABA =

Tabletop role-playing game

End All Be All
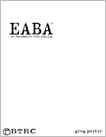
- Cover of the first edition EABA core rule book
- Designers: Greg Porter
- Publishers: Blacksburg Tactical Research Center
- Publication: 2003 (1st ed); 2012 (v2)
- Genres: Universal
- Systems: EABA

The End All Be All game system, commonly known as EABA and pronounced "ee-buh", is a role-playing game system from Blacksburg Tactical Research Center (BTRC). It is a generic gaming system designed to adapt to any imaginary gaming environment. It was created by Greg Porter in 2003. The game cites the Hero System, GURPS and Call of Cthulhu as influences in its development.

The game books and related materials are available only in a PDF format download, or printed on demand.

== History ==
=== Prior RPG History ===
Role-playing games (RPGs) of the 1970s and early 1980s were environment specific, and incompatible with one another. For example, TSR published its Dungeons & Dragons game specifically for a fantasy environment; Star Frontiers for science fiction-based role-playing; and other games for other environments, such as Gamma World, Top Secret, Gangbusters, Boot Hill. Each of these games was set with its own self-contained rules system, and the rules for playing each game differed greatly from one game to the next.

This changed with the publication of GURPS, or Generic Universal Role Playing System, by Steve Jackson Games in 1986, the first commercially successful, all-encompassing, "universal" role-playing system.

In 1987, BTRC published its first role-playing game, TimeLords, an expansive game about time travel. As a time travel/sci fi-based game crossing many possible settings, much of the groundwork was already laid for a generic RPG system, and in fact some players were already using it as such. The basics of the TimeLords system provided the framework that would be developed into EABA.

=== EABA 1st Edition ===
EABA was first published in 2003 in PDF format only, available either through online download or print on demand. Publishing in this manner meant the company would not go into debt to print a large run of rulebooks and push them into brick-and-mortar stores, and that future updates to the rules could be easily made and disseminated. BTRC allows purchasers to get free upgrades for life on all titles.

=== EABA v2 ===
In 2012, BTRC published its first major revamp of the EABA rules as EABA v2. In addition to significant revamping of the combat turn system, this version made use of many of the built-in features of the Adobe PDF format, and was streamlined for use on tablet or laptop computers. Players have access to automated character sheets, dice rollers, popup menus and on-screen mapping, embedded directly into the PDF file. It is compatible with any computer or device that can read this file type, including smart phones and tablets. The file can also be printed and read like any ordinary rulebook.

== Reception ==
EABA initially received excellent reviews, and was described as "an overlooked and underappreciated Titan in the arena of universal RPG systems". Critics praised the simplicity and ease of use, and the ability for players to choose what level of realism to include. Initial criticism focused on the lack of many additional premade settings and the bland artwork. It did not sell incredibly well, and is relatively unknown among RPG fans.

The v2 edition also received excellent reviews, calling it "the bleeding edge of PDF game development", and praising the scalability and portability of the system.

== Game Mechanics ==
=== Characters ===
A character in EABA is built based on attributes, skills and traits. All player characters start with a set number of Attribute Points (AP) to purchase attributes, and Skill Points (SP) to purchase skills. Traits are purchased using either type of points, depending on the trait purchased; negative traits can also be chosen which give a character additional AP or SP to spend.

The total number of points available to spend depends on the setting and players. A gritty post-holocaust survival game may only start with 80 AP and SP, while a superhero game could start with 400 AP and SP. In principle a gamemaster can balance the power of foes to the abilities of the player characters by comparing their relative point values.

=== Attributes ===
Characters in EABA have six basic attributes:

- Strength — A measure of the character’s physical power and bulk, ability to lift, carry, and do damage
- Agility — A measure of the character’s physical agility, coordination and manual dexterity
- Awareness — A measure of the character’s mental capacity, intelligence and perception
- Will — A measure of the character's force of personality, and ability to endure pain
- Health — A measure of the character’s physical stamina, ability to resist disease, and speed
- Fate — A measure of the character's luck and paranormal abilities.

Attribute scores progress exponentially, rather than linearly as is typical of many games. Increasing an ability score by 3 is an approximate doubling of the Attribute. For example, a Strength score of 9 could lift approximately 100 kg, while a score of 12 would double that to 200 kg.

A score of 5-9 is considered average for any human attribute, 13 is the upper limit of human ability, and anything over 15 considered legendary.

=== Skills ===
Skills are purchased using skill points in a similar manner to attributes. Each skill has an associated attribute; Firearms is based on Agility, Programming based on Awareness, etc. A character without any ability in a particular skill can use the base attribute with a penalty to determine the success of an action. Spending points on a skill will eliminate the penalty and spending more points will grant bonus dice.

The basic game system provides an extensive list of possible skills and specializations to them, and each setting comes with listings of additional setting-specific skills. Players are encouraged to create more skills as needed to cover whatever game setting or style they might want.

=== Traits ===
Traits are additional things about a character, positive or negative, that help flesh them out. Traits are purchased using either AP or SP, depending on which trait is wanted. Some negative traits give the player additional AP or SP to spend.

An example is the character's age. Most characters are considered to start at between 16–20 years old (for humans). An older character would lose Attribute Points, as an aging person would generally get physically weaker; but gain Skill Points, as they generally have learned more skills in their longer life.

Characters could also be more (or less) wealthy than average, or have a special ability like exceptional luck or the ability to use magic (depending on the game setting). Various game setting include rules for many additional traits, and players are encouraged to create more as they see fit.

=== Success Rolls ===
EABA is a d6-based dice pool system. A higher ability or skill level will allow a player to roll more dice to determine success or failure of an action, but only a limited number of dice - usually three, although there is a Trait that permits four or more under certain conditions - may be chosen from the total number of dice rolled. If there are more than three dice in the pool, one of them may be converted to a +2. So an action with a difficulty of 1 will always succeed, but an action with a difficulty higher than 20 will always fail, as 20 is the highest possible roll on 3d6+2. Additional factors may make an action more or less difficult, thus increasing or decreasing the number needed for success.

=== Combat ===
Combat in EABA is handled either by opposing rolls (mêlée) or against a set difficulty (ranged), both of which might be modified by things like target size, movement, visibility and so on. There are also numerous optional rules, such as explosions, called shots, hit locations and their specific damage effects, automatic fire, parrying etc.

Combat uses an unusual initiative system where combatants secretly bid to see who acts first, and there's an action penalty for rushing. In a round, each character takes one major action and one minor action, with cumulative penalties for additional actions.

Combat time in V2 is run on an expanding scale, something unique to EABA. In most RPGs, time in combat is broken down into small manageable chunks: a combat turn in GURPS is always one second, for example. A combat round is EABA starts at one second, the next is 2 seconds, then 4, 8, 15, 30, and one minute. The goal is to make time manageable, but also to allow characters to perform complex actions during combat without taking hours of play time to do so. Greg Porter explained that he came up with the idea after watching the original Matrix movie, where he estimated the famous combat scene took about 77 seconds from start to finish. In a standard RPG combat system, this could take players several hours of play time to complete, but the new EABA system would be done in only 6 rounds.

=== Damage and defenses ===
EABA has three types of damage, lethal, half-lethal, and non-lethal. Cutting and piercing attacks tend to be lethal, crushing attacks half-lethal and unarmed attacks non-lethal.
Armor is rated in terms of dice it will stop, and that is subtracted from the possible damage the attack may cause. So armor rated at 1d will reduce 1d of damage to nothing, and 2d of damage to 1d. Armor will generally always stop damage from attacks lower than its rating. For example, a bullet proof vest rated to stop .22 caliber rounds will always stop them, provided the round hits the vest.
Additional damage to an already injured body part will have less effect than the first damage. ie, shooting someone in the leg once will reduce their mobility a lot and cause bleeding; shooting the same leg three more times will not reduce their mobility much more.

=== Advancement ===
Improving the characters is done with experience points, which are either accumulated for general use by adventuring, or for specific skills by training. Experience points can be used to improve both skills and attributes, with attributes costing much more to improve than skills.

== EABA-related game settings ==
- Aethos - high-tech/espionage/thriller/alien culture/exploration
- Age of Ruin - nanotech post-apocalypse
- Agency - paranoid conspiracy
- Agency 1957 - paranoid conspiracy in the 1950s
- Code:Black - contemporary horror
- CORPS v3.0 - modern conspiracy
- Dark Millennium - alternate history, zombies in 11th century Earth
- Eschaton - superhero post-apocalypse
- Fires of Heaven - science fiction
- grep - nanotech post-apocalypse
- NeoTerra - cyberpunk / virtual reality
- Nocture - alternate reality
- SpaceTime - science fiction / cyberpunk
- The Colonies - science fiction
- TimeLords - time travel
- Verne - steampunk
- Warp World - post-apocalypse / fantasy
- Ythrek - low tech / fantasy

=== Supplements ===
- Guns! Guns! Guns!, firearms design rules, adaptable to any RPG
- Stuff! 2006. item design tools, adaptable to any RPG. Nominated for 2006 Ennie award
- EABAlarp - a live action role-playing version of the rules
- EABAanywhere - a highly trimmed version of the rules, focusing on portability and speed

=== Third party supplements ===
- Road to Armageddon - post apocalypse / magic setting by Phalanx Game Design
- Rune Stryders - fantasy setting by Precis Intermedia

== Reviews ==
- Pyramid
