= TFK =

TFK may refer to:

- Telefunken, a German chipmaker
- The Flower Kings, a Swedish prog rock band
- The Forbidden Kingdom, a 2008 martial arts film
- Thousand Foot Krutch, a Canadian rock band
- Time For Kids, a children's magazine
