= SpaceTime =

Tabletop science fiction role-playing game

SpaceTime is a role-playing game published by Blacksburg Tactical Research Center in 1988.

== Description ==
SpaceTime is a cyberpunk system, fully compatible with Timelords. Set in a nasty urban future ruled by interplanetary corporations, the rules cover character creation, skills, combat, medical technology, equipment, weapons, and alien environments.

== Publication history ==
SpaceTime was designed by Greg Porter, and published by Blacksburg Tactical Research Center in 1988 as a 128-page book.

Renegade Dreams, a cyberpunk adventure, was released in 1989.

In 2003, the game was redone as a setting under BTRC's EABA game system.

== Reviews ==
- Challenge (Issue 39)
- Games Review (Volume 1, Issue 11 - Aug 1989)
