= CORPS Worldbook 1992 =

CORPS Worldbook 1992 is a supplement published by Blacksburg Tactical Research Center in 1992 for the modern-day roleplaying rules system CORPS.

== Contents ==
CORPS Worldbook 1992 is a game supplement which details the condition of the world in 1992, including game statistics for about 150 countries, with information about gun laws from around the world. Each country listed has a capsule review of recent events, and is rated for political corruption, standard of living and human-rights violations.

== Reception ==
In the September 1993 edition of Dragon (Issue #197), Allen Varney called this book "impressive", and gave it a strong recommendation, saying, "Readable and informative, it's recommended to referees of any modern-era RPGs who want to inject a dose of reality into their campaigns."

== Reviews ==
- Abyss Quarterly #50 (Winter, 1992)
- Modern Mythology (Volume 1, Number 3 - Jul/Aug 1993)
