= Warp World =

Tabletop role-playing game

- Designers: Greg Porter
- Publishers: Blacksburg Tactical Research Center
- Publication: 1991 (1st edition); 2003 (EABA version)
- Genres: Post-apocalyptic
- Systems: custom (1991), EABA (2003)

Warp World is a 1991 role-playing game published by Blacksburg Tactical Research Center.

== Setting ==
Warp World is set on Earth, 300 years after World War III, which allowed the old gods and creatures of myth to return. The setting is a combination of post-apocalyptic science fiction and fantasy.

== History ==
Warp World was designed by Greg Porter, and published by Blacksburg Tactical Research Center in 1991 as a 208-page softcover book.

In 2003, the game was redone as a setting under BTRC's EABA universal game system.

== Reception ==
Jim Foster reviewed Warp World in White Wolf #29 (Oct./Nov., 1991), rating it a 4 out of 5 and stated that "My overall impression of Warp World is that of a good framework of systems and general background material with which an enterprising GM could make an exciting campaign. It will require some work and a bit of experience, however; this game is not for beginners or anyone else expecting a sourcebook of prefab campaigns and ready-to-play adventures. What it does offer is a very playable and realistic set of systems that govern 'reality' and fantasy with equal ease."

== Reviews ==
- Voyages to the Worlds of SF Gaming (Issue 17 - Oct 1992)
- The Last Province (Issue 1 - Oct 1992)
- Magister (Issue 36 - Sep 1992)
