= Down in Flames (CORPS) =

Down in Flames is a 1999 role-playing game supplement published by Blacksburg Tactical Research Center for CORPS.

== Contents ==
Down in Flames is a supplement in which 13 apocalyptic scenarios are presented—ranging from natural disasters and man-made catastrophes to alien invasions, divine retribution, and societal collapse—for gamemasters to unleash world-ending chaos in their campaigns.

== Reviews ==
- Pyramid
- Science Fiction Age
