= No Middle Ground =

No Middle Ground is a board game simulating operational level ground combat between Israel and Syria on the Golan Heights during the 1973 Arab-Israeli War. The product is intended as a simple game suitable for novices.

Microgame Design Group (MDG) in 2003 issued No Middle Ground in a plastic sleeve with a paper map and unmounted counters. MDG in 2004 posted online a downloadable expansion called Target Damascus.

== Components ==
168 unmounted counters representing Israeli and Syrian units and informational pieces; an 11" by 17" hexagon-patterned map, a rulebook, and two players' aid sheets. The game requires but does not include a six-sided die.

== Credits ==
Game Design: Paul Rohrbaugh
Graphics: Kerry Anderson, Paul Rohrbaugh
Editing: Kerry Anderson, Peter Schutze
Playtesting: Brian Brennan, Joe Bowser, Peter Schutze, Stefan Anton Federsel

== Expansions ==
A No Middle Ground expansion set titled Target Damascus was briefly posted for download from MDG, but with MDG's closure the files are no longer available.

== Sources ==
- Elusive Victory: The Arab-Israeli Wars, 1947-1974, by Trevor N. Dupuy, Harper and Row, New York, 1978
- Arabs at War: Military Effectiveness 1948-1991, by Kenneth M. Pollack, University of Nebraska Press, Lincoln, Nebraska, 2002
- Games of the Golan, by John D. Burtt in Paper Wars #62, July 2006
