= Dreamtime (CORPS) =

Dreamtime is a 1997 role-playing game supplement for CORPS published by Blacksburg Tactical Research Center.

== Contents ==
Dreamtime is a supplement which details an aboriginal setting in which the player characters are hunter gatherers.

== Reception ==
Cliff Ramshaw reviewed Dreamtime for Arcane magazine, rating it an 8 out of 10 overall. Ramshaw comments that "Only referees prepared to work hard and put in plenty of imagination need apply. Those that do will discover something rare and thought-provoking."
