= Supertanker of Death =

Supertanker of Death is a 1991 role-playing supplement for TimeLords published by Blacksburg Tactical Research Center.

== Contents ==
Supertanker of Death is a supplement in which a three-part adventure takes place on Earth in the year 2035.

== Publication history ==
Supertanker of Death was the first published adventure supplement for TimeLords, and is intended for beginning-level player characters.

== Reception ==
Jim Foster reviewed Supertanker of Death in White Wolf #31 (May/June, 1992), rating it a 3 out of 5 and stated that "Overall, this is a fairly decent product containing a number of good ideas that center around a fairly commonplace series of missions. It is not race-out-and-buy material by any means, but if you're looking for a basic low-level adventure for a reasonable price, Supertanker of Death is worth a look."
