= Gunfight in the Valley of Tears, October 9, 1973 =

Gunfight in the Valley of Tears, Oct. 9, 1973 is a board game simulating tactical level ground combat between Israel and Syria on the Golan Heights during the 1973 Arab-Israeli War. The product is intended as a simple game suitable for novices.

Perry Moore in 2003 issued Gunfight in the Valley of Tears in a plastic sleeve with a paper map and unmounted and uncut counters.

== Components ==
480 unmounted and uncut counters representing Israeli and Syrian units and informational pieces; an 11" by 17" hexagon-patterned map, a rulebook, and players' aid sheets. The game requires but does not include a ten-sided die.

== Credits ==
Game Design: Perry Moore
Game Development: Paul Rohrbaugh, Brian Brennan

== Sources ==
- Elusive Victory: The Arab-Israeli Wars, 1947-1974, by Trevor N. Dupuy, Harper and Row, New York, 1978
- Arabs at War: Military Effectiveness 1948-1991, by Kenneth M. Pollack, University of Nebraska Press, Lincoln, Nebraska, 2002
