= Technology 1991 =

Technology 1991 is a 1991 role-playing supplement for CORPS published by Blacksburg Tactical Research Center.

== Contents ==
Technology 1991 is a supplement in which weapons, vehicles, security equipment and other gear are detailed.

== Reception ==
Jim Foster reviewed Corps: Technology 1991 in White Wolf #29 (Oct./Nov., 1991), rating it a 4 out of 5 and stated that "Technology 1991 is pretty much a must buy for anyone who player and enjoys Corps, and is a noteworthy option for most other espionage, modern and near-future gamers. The only caveat here is that all the stats are given in Corps terms. However, since these stats are based on real-life value, a little careful reading and common sense should allow adaptation to other systems with a minimum of effort."

== Reviews ==
- Voyages to the Worlds of SF Gaming (Issue 17 - Oct 1992)
