= Slag!: Combat on the High Frontier =

1995 wargame

Slag!: Combat on the High Frontier is a 1995 wargame published by Blacksburg Tactical Research Center.

== Gameplay ==
Slag!: Combat on the High Frontier is a game in which a tactical starship combat game delivers a full ruleset in just 28 pages. The game is centered around starship design and strategic combat. Each vessel is built by assigning various systems—like weapons, engines, sensors—to specific zones on a grid-based ship plan. The number and arrangement of these systems determine ship size, point cost, and overall performance. Combat unfolds over movement and firing phases, using ship stats alone—no dice—to resolve damage. Battles are map-based, playable on hex grids or even chess boards, with counters crafted from included stickers. Hits directly affect individual systems on a ship's schematic.

== Reception ==
Andy Butcher reviewed Slag!: Combat on the High Frontier for Arcane magazine, rating it a 7 out of 10 overall, and stated that "Slag! is hardly likely to revolutionise table-top wargaming, but that's not its intention. It sets out to be a fast, simple and fun game of spaceship combat, and in that regard it's a complete success."
