= Lara Marlowe =

US-born journalist and author

- Born: 25 April 1957 (age 68); California, United States
- Education: UCLA, Sorbonne, Oxford
- Occupation: Journalist
- Years active: 1981–present
- Notable credit(s): War correspondent (most recently Iraq War, Afghanistan, 2006 Lebanon War); Beirut Bureau chief – Time (1981–1996); Middle East correspondent – The Irish Times (1996–2009); US correspondent – The Irish Times (2009–2012), Books: The Things I've Seen (2010), Painted with Words (2011)
- Spouse: Robert Fisk (1994–2006)

Lara Marlowe (born 25 April 1957) is a US-born journalist and author, who was the US correspondent for The Irish Times (2009–2012) before returning to Paris in 2013 as the paper's Paris correspondent. Marlowe also spent 15 years as a journalist for Time. She was married to Robert Fisk for 12 years.

On April 11, 2019, Marlowe became a naturalized French citizen.

== Career ==
Born in California, Marlowe received a B.A. in French from UCLA and a Master's in International Relations from Oxford University; she also spent a year of study at the Sorbonne. She became a correspondent for The Irish Times in 1996, after resigning, in the wake of the Qana massacre, from Time, where she was Beirut bureau chief, in protest at the reluctance of its editors to print anything critical of Israel.

She regularly reported from Iraq following the 2003 US-led invasion thereof. She has been a guest contributor to many broadcast and print outlets. Marlowe is a leading journalist on the Middle East as well as domestic French politics. For her work, she was made Chevalier of the Légion d'Honneur in 2006. She is a regular contributor to Newstalk in Ireland.

While based in Washington D.C. for The Irish Times, Marlowe traveled twice to Haiti reporting on the immediate aftermath of its catastrophic earthquake in January 2010, and again in July 2010.

Marlowe has written three books: The Things I've Seen (2010), Painted with Words (2011) and Love in a Time of War (2021). The last book is a memoir of the period she worked with Fisk.
