= Andrea Koppel =

American journalist and communiations strategist

- Born: New York City, U.S.
- Education: Middlebury College
- Occupations: Communications strategist, journalist
- Spouse: Kenneth M. Pollack
- Father: Ted Koppel

Andrea Koppel is an American communications strategist and former TV journalist.

== Early life and education ==
Koppel was born in New York City, the daughter of Ted Koppel, a television journalist, and Grace Anne Dorney Koppel, an attorney and spokesperson for Chronic obstructive pulmonary disease (COPD). Her father is Jewish and her mother is Catholic.

She attended Stone Ridge Country Day School of the Sacred Heart and earned a bachelor's degree in political science with a concentration in Chinese language and Asian studies from Middlebury College. She is proficient in Mandarin Chinese.

== Career ==
Koppel was a Congressional correspondent for CNN until August 2007. Prior to that she served as the network's State Department correspondent from 1998 until October 2006. Koppel joined CNN in 1993 as the network's Tokyo correspondent and in 1995 became CNN's Beijing Bureau Chief.

In February 2008, she joined M+R Strategic Services, a Washington, DC–based cause-oriented public affairs firm as SVP and Head of its Communications Division.

As of 2010, Koppel was the Director of International Communications for the Red Cross and a director of the Henry L. Stimson Center.

In June 2011, Andrea joined Mercy Corps as its Vice President of Global Engagement and Policy, leading global policy and advocacy strategies.

== Personal life ==
Koppel is married to Kenneth Pollack, an intelligence and Middle East analyst.
