= Notes to Eternity =

- Film poster
- Directed by: Sarah Cordery
- Release date: 2016
- Running time: 147 minutes
- Country: New Zealand
- Language: English

Notes to Eternity is a 2016 documentary feature film by New Zealand director Sarah Cordery, released theatrically in 2016. It is a meditation on the Israel-Palestine conflict centring on the lives and ideas of Noam Chomsky, Robert Fisk, Norman Finkelstein and Sara Roy.

It was selected for the Documentary Panorama programme of the Belfast Film Festival in 2017. and the Screening Rights Film Festival 2017. It screened as part of the Directed By Women 2017 season at the Genesis Cinema in London and had its Scottish premiere at the Glasgow Film Theatre.

A preliminary cut premiered at the New Zealand International Film Festival in 2014.
