= Robert Fisk =

English writer and journalist (1946–2020)

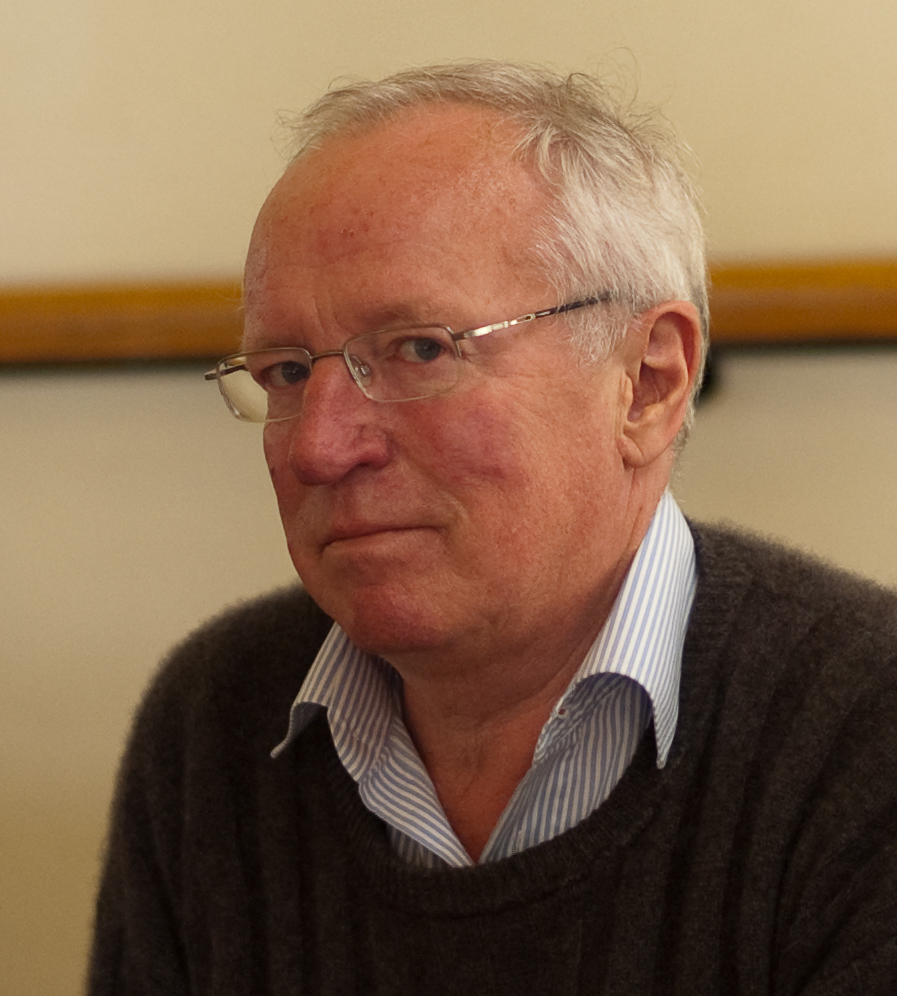
- Fisk at Al Jazeera Forum 2010
- Born: Robert William Fisk; 12 July 1946; Maidstone, Kent, England
- Died: 30 October 2020 (aged 74); Dublin, Ireland
- Citizenship: Irish; British
- Education: Lancaster University (BA, 1968); Trinity College Dublin (PhD, 1985)
- Occupation: Middle East correspondent for The Independent
- Notable credits: Jacob's Award; Amnesty International UK Press Awards; British Press Awards; International Journalist of the Year; Lannan Cultural Freedom Prize
- Spouses: Lara Marlowe (m. 1994; div. 2006); Nelofer Pazira (m. 2009)
- Website: independent.co.uk/author/robert-fisk

Robert William Fisk (12 July 1946 – 30 October 2020) was an English writer and journalist. He was critical of United States foreign policy in the Middle East, and the Israeli government's treatment of Palestinians.

As an international correspondent, he covered the civil wars in Lebanon, Algeria, and Syria, the Iran–Iraq conflict, the wars in Bosnia and Kosovo, the Soviet invasion of Afghanistan, the Islamic revolution in Iran, Saddam Hussein's invasion of Kuwait, and the U.S. invasion and occupation of Iraq. An Arabic speaker, he was among the few Western journalists to interview Osama bin Laden, which he did three times between 1993 and 1997.

Fisk began his journalistic career at the Newcastle Chronicle and then the Sunday Express. From there, he went to work for The Times as a correspondent in Northern Ireland, Portugal, and the Middle East; in the last role, he based himself in Beirut intermittently from 1976. After 1989, he worked for The Independent. Fisk received many British and international journalism awards, including the Press Awards Foreign Reporter of the Year seven times.

Fisk's books include The Point of No Return (1975), In Time of War (1985), Pity the Nation: Lebanon at War (1990), The Great War for Civilisation: The Conquest of the Middle East (2005), and Syria: Descent Into the Abyss (2015).

The noun fisking (meaning a point-by-point rebuttal) and the related verb fisk were named after him.

== Early life and education ==
Fisk was an only child, born in Maidstone, Kent, to William and Peggy Fisk. His father was Borough Treasurer at Maidstone Corporation and had fought in the First World War. His mother was an amateur painter who in later years became a Maidstone magistrate. At the end of the war Bill Fisk was punished for disobeying an order to execute another soldier; his son said, "My father's refusal to kill another man was the only thing he did in his life which I would also have done." Though his father said little about his part in the war, it fascinated his son. After his father's death, he discovered that he had been the scribe of his battalion's war diaries from August 1918.

Fisk was educated at Yardley Court, a preparatory school, then at Sutton Valence School and Lancaster University, where he undertook his B.A. in Latin and Linguistics and contributed to the student magazine John O'Gauntlet . He gained a PhD in political science from Trinity College Dublin in 1983; the title of his doctoral thesis was "A Condition of Limited Warfare: Éire's Neutrality and the Relationship between Dublin, Belfast and London, 1939–1945". It was published as In Time of War: Ireland, Ulster and the Price of Neutrality 1939-1945 (London: André Deutsch, 1983; reprinted in Dublin by Gill & MacMillan, 1996). Reviewer F. I. Magee in 1984 wrote: "This book presents a detailed and definitive account of Anglo-Irish relations during the Second World War....Fisk's excellent book highlights the ambivalence in relations between Britain, the Irish Republic and Northern Ireland and goes a long way towards explaining why the current situation is so intractable."

== Career ==
=== Newspaper correspondent ===
Fisk worked on the Sunday Express diary column before a disagreement with the editor, John Junor, prompted a move to The Times. From 1972 to 1975, at the height of the Troubles, Fisk was the Times Belfast correspondent, before being posted to Portugal after the Carnation Revolution in 1974. He then was appointed Middle East correspondent (1976–1987). In addition to the Troubles and Portugal, he reported the Iranian revolution in 1979. When a story of his on Iran Air Flight 655 was spiked shortly after the paper's takeover by Rupert Murdoch, Fisk moved to The Independent in 1989. The New York Times called Fisk "probably the most famous foreign correspondent in Britain". The Economist called him "one of the most influential correspondents in the Middle East since the Second World War."

=== War reporting ===
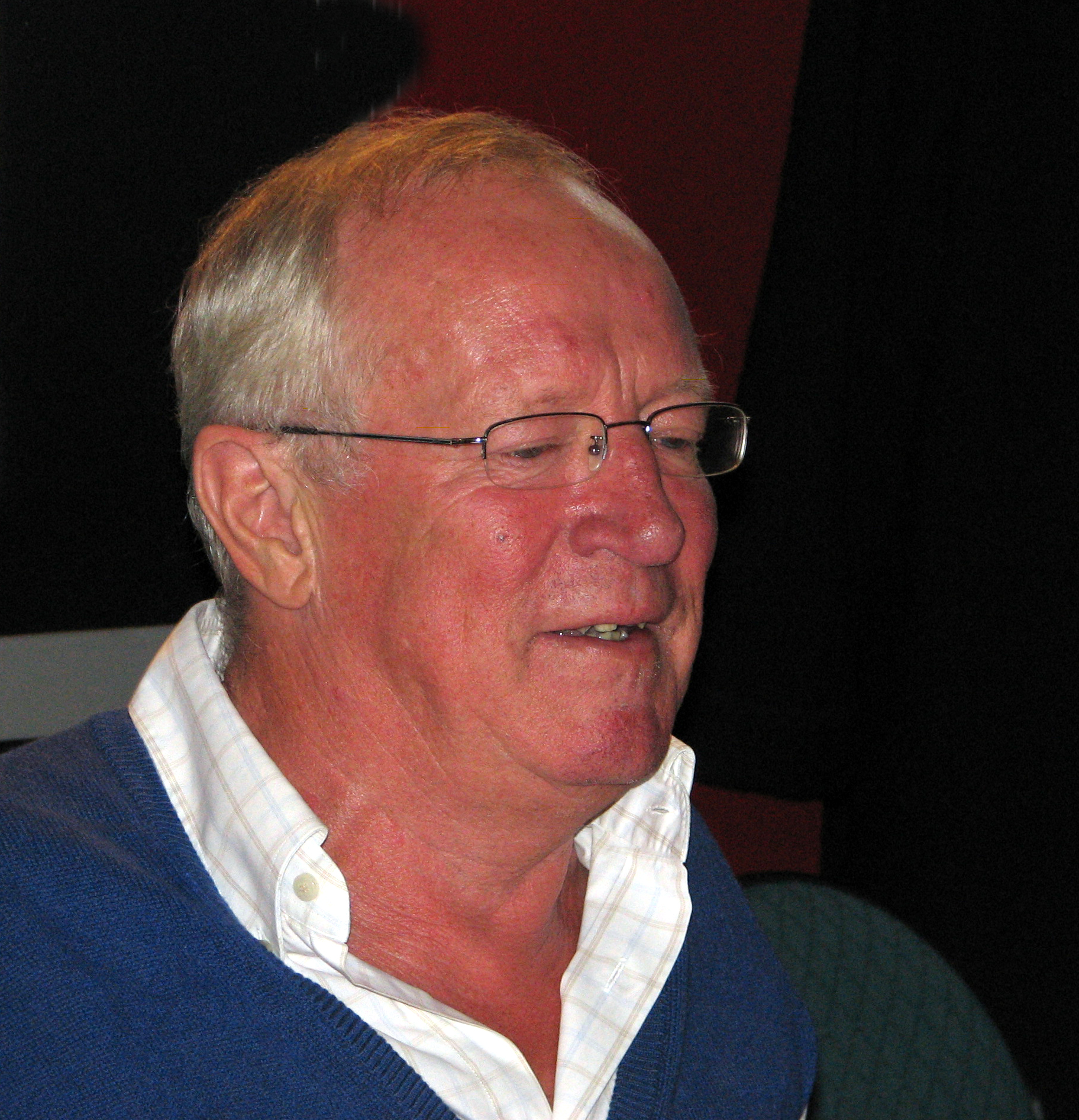
Robert Fisk in 2008

Fisk lived in Beirut from 1976, remaining throughout the Lebanese Civil War. He was one of the first Western journalists to report on the Sabra and Shatila massacre in Lebanon, as well as the Hama Massacre in Syria. His book on the Lebanese conflict, Pity the Nation: Lebanon at War, was published in 1990.

Fisk also reported on the Soviet–Afghan War, the Iran–Iraq War, the Arab–Israeli conflict, the Gulf War, the Kosovo War, the Algerian Civil War, the Bosnian War, the 2001 international intervention in Afghanistan, the invasion of Iraq in 2003, the Arab Spring in 2011, and the ongoing Syrian Civil War. During the Iran–Iraq War, he suffered permanent partial hearing loss as a result of being close to Iraqi heavy artillery in the Shatt-al-Arab when covering the early stages of the conflict.

After the United States and allies launched their intervention in Afghanistan, Fisk was for a time transferred to Pakistan to cover the conflict. While reporting from there, he was attacked and beaten by a group of Afghan refugees fleeing heavy bombing by the United States Air Force. In his graphic account of nearly being beaten to death before a local Muslim leader intervened, Fisk absolved the attackers of responsibility, writing that their "brutality was entirely the product of others, of us—of we who had armed their struggle against the Russians and ignored their pain and laughed at their civil war and then armed and paid them again for the 'War for Civilisation' just a few miles away and then bombed their homes and ripped up their families and called them 'collateral damage'." According to American legal scholar Richard A. Falk, Fisk said of his attacker: "There is every reason to be angry. I've been an outspoken critic of the US actions myself. If I had been them, I would have attacked me."

During the 2003 invasion of Iraq, Fisk was based in Baghdad and filed many eyewitness reports. He criticised other journalists based in Iraq for what he called their "hotel journalism": reporting from one's hotel room without interviews or firsthand experience of events. Fisk's criticism of the invasion was rejected by some other journalists. Fisk criticised the Coalition's handling of the sectarian violence in post-invasion Iraq and argued that the official narrative of sectarian conflict was not possible: "The real question I ask myself is: who are these people who are trying to provoke the civil war? Now the Americans will say it's Al Qaeda, it's the Sunni insurgents. It is the death squads. Many of the death squads work for the Ministry of Interior. Who runs the Ministry of Interior in Baghdad? Who pays the Ministry of the Interior? Who pays the militiamen who make up the death squads? We do, the occupation authorities. ... We need to look at this story in a different light."

His 2005 work, The Great War for Civilisation, was critical of Western and Israeli approaches to the Middle East. For The Independent on Sunday, Neal Ascherson wrote: "This is a very long book, allowing Fisk to interleave political analysis, recent history and his own adventures with the real stories which concern him. These are the sufferings of ordinary people under monstrous tyrannies or in criminal, avoidable wars". In The Guardian, former British Ambassador to Libya Oliver Miles complained of "a deplorable number of mistakes" in the book that "undermine the reader's confidence", and that "vigilant editing and ruthless pruning could perhaps have made two or three good short books out of this one". Richard Beeston, a longtime foreign correspondent and then foreign editor for The Times, wrote in a review of the book that Fisk's "central argument is lost in a verbal avalanche, as Fisk empties 30 years of notebooks onto the page" and that while there are what he calls "passages of descriptive brilliance" he considered some of his arguments "ridiculous" and "utter nonsense".

=== Osama bin Laden ===
Fisk interviewed Osama bin Laden on three occasions. The interviews appeared in articles published by The Independent on 6 December 1993, 10 July 1996, and 22 March 1997. In Fisk's first interview, "Anti-Soviet warrior puts his army on the road to peace", he wrote of bin Laden, then overseeing the construction of a highway in Sudan: "With his high cheekbones, narrow eyes and long brown robe, Mr Bin Laden looks every inch the mountain warrior of mujahedin legend. Chadored children danced in front of him, preachers acknowledged his wisdom" while observing that he was accused of "training for further jihad wars".

During one of Fisk's interviews with bin Laden, Fisk noted an attempt by bin Laden to convert him. Bin Laden said: "Mr Robert, one of our brothers had a dream ... that you were a spiritual person ... this means you are a true Muslim". Fisk replied: "Sheikh Osama, I am not a Muslim. ... I am a journalist [whose] task is to tell the truth." Bin Laden replied: "If you tell the truth, that means you are a good Muslim." During the 1996 interview, bin Laden said the Saudi royal family was corrupt. During the final interview in 1997, bin Laden said he sought God's help "to turn America into a shadow of itself".

Fisk strongly condemned the September 11 attacks, calling them a "hideous crime against humanity". He also denounced the Bush administration's response to the attacks, arguing that "a score of nations" were being identified and positioned as "haters of democracy" or "kernels of evil", and urged a more honest debate on U.S. policy in the Middle East. He argued that such a debate had hitherto been avoided "because, of course, to look too closely at the Middle East would raise disturbing questions about the region, about our Western policies in those tragic lands, and about America's relationship with Israel".

In 2007, Fisk expressed personal doubts about the official historical record of the attacks. In an article for The Independent, he wrote that, while the Bush administration was incapable of successfully carrying out such attacks due to its organisational incompetence, he was "increasingly troubled at the inconsistencies in the official narrative of 9/11". He said he did not condone the "crazed 'research' of David Icke" but was "talking about scientific issues". Fisk had earlier addressed similar concerns in a 2006 speech at Sydney University, in which he said: "Partly I think because of the culture of secrecy of the White House—never have we had a White House so secret as this one—partly because of this culture, I think suspicions are growing in the United States, not just among Berkeley guys with flowers in their hair. ... But there are a lot of things we don't know, a lot of things we're not going to be told. ... Perhaps the [fourth] plane was hit by a missile, we still don't know".

Bill Durodié noted that at one point bin Laden advised the White House to "read Robert Fisk, rather than, as one might have supposed, the Koran."

=== Syrian Civil War ===
Reporting from Douma in April 2018 on the Douma chemical attack, Fisk quoted a Syrian doctor who attributed the victims' breathing problems not to gas but to dust and lack of oxygen after heavy shelling by government forces. Other people he spoke to doubted a gas attack, and Fisk queried the incident. His reporting was criticised for relying on government-supplied contacts, with Asser Khattab writing in Raseef22 that the doctor Fisk quoted "had been introduced to him by officials in the Syrian government and army". Richard Spencer and Catherine Philp in The Times wrote that journalists had been taken to Douma on a government-organised trip while international investigators were forced to remain in Damascus, and that the doctor Fisk interviewed admitted to not having been to the hospital where the victims were taken. According to Snopes, other reporters on the same trip as Fisk had interviewed locals who said they had inhaled toxic gas.

Fisk returned to the subject of the Douma attacks in a January 2020 article about internal disagreements within the Organisation for the Prohibition of Chemical Weapons (OPCW) recorded in documents released by WikiLeaks.

=== Media appearances ===
In 1993, Fisk produced a three-part series, From Beirut To Bosnia, which he said was an attempt "to find out why an increasing number of Muslims had come to hate the West". Fisk said that the Discovery Channel did not rerun the films, after initially showing them in full, due to a letter campaign by pro-Israel groups such as CAMERA.

Kirsty Young interviewed Fisk for Desert Island Discs in 2006. His final selections were Adagio for Strings by Samuel Barber, Le Morte d'Arthur by Thomas Malory, and a violin.

Fisk featured in the 2016 documentary film Notes to Eternity by New Zealand filmmaker Sarah Cordery, along with Noam Chomsky, Norman Finkelstein, and Sara Roy. The film explores their lives and work in relation to the Israel-Palestine conflict.

Fisk was profiled in Yung Chang's 2019 documentary film This Is Not a Movie. Reviewing the film, Slant Magazine wrote: "The two things that give this documentary its power and provocativeness are intellectual rather than dramatic: Fisk’s work, and his ideas." Cath Clarke, writing for The Guardian, said the film asks its audience about war: "Is there something deep in our souls that permits it because it feels natural? His painful, deeply serious question about the inevitability of war sets the tone of this documentary about his career."

== Views ==
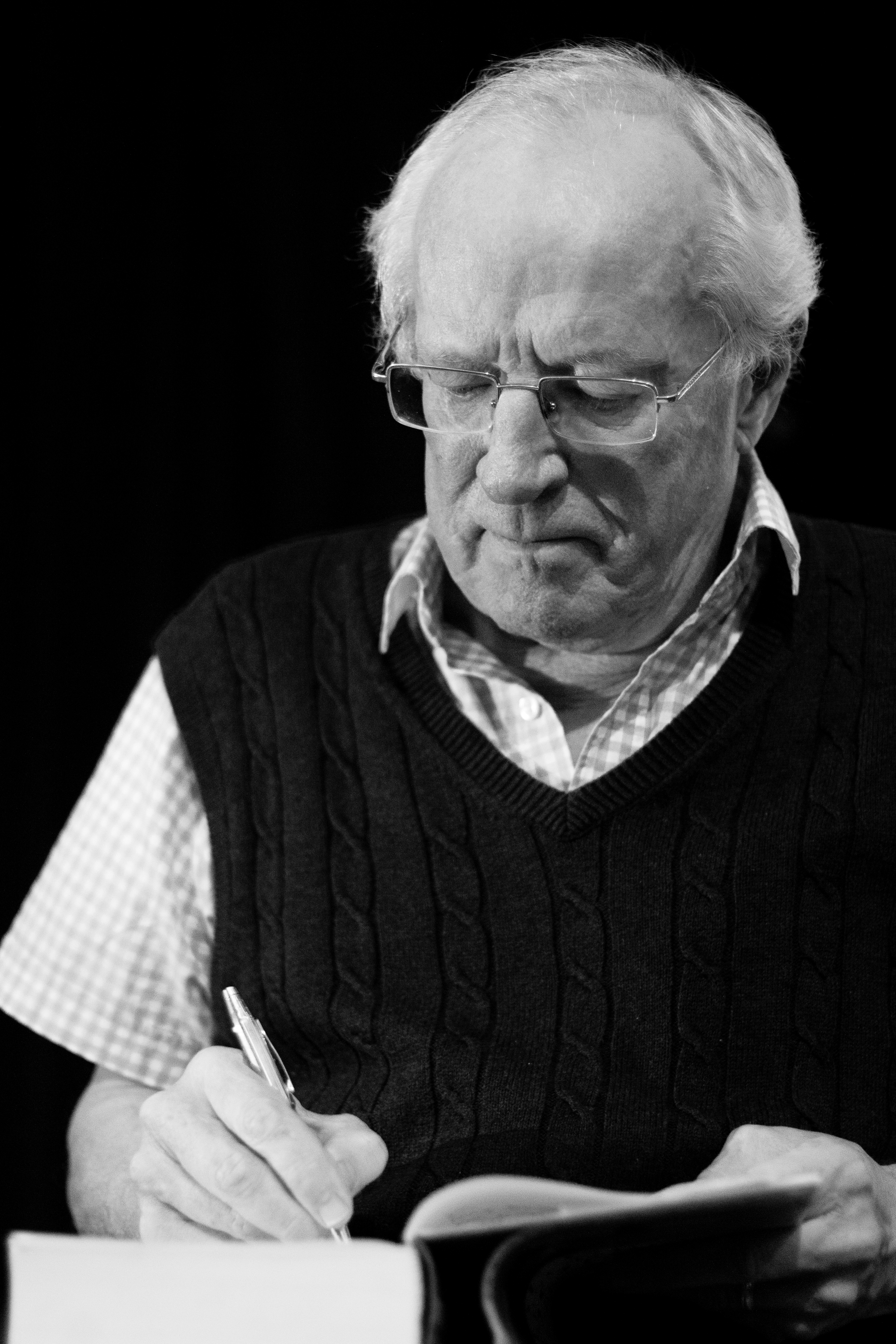
Fisk book signing in 2015

=== Stances and reception ===
Fisk was known for his criticism of U.S. foreign policy, particularly the country's involvement in the wars in Afghanistan and the Middle East. He was consistently critical of Israel, calling some of its actions against Palestinians war crimes. One of his beliefs was that he should report events from the point of view of the victim rather than those in authority. In its November 2020 obituary of Fisk, The Times wrote that he had developed a "visceral dislike of the Israeli government and its allies" after covering the Sabra and Shatila massacre, arguing that this had made Fisk biased and "unable to provide a dispassionate account of events and their context". David Pryce-Jones, writing in The Spectator in 2003, said that Fisk was guilty of "hysteria and distortion" in his coverage of Middle Eastern topics. In contrast, The Independent, for whom he wrote from 1989, called him "renowned for his courage in questioning official narratives from governments".

The BBC's Jeremy Bowen also praised Fisk after his death, and noted the controversy he drew for his "sharp criticism of the US and Israel, and of Western foreign policy". Bowen called himself an admirer who would miss Fisk's "guts and his appetite for the fight". Fisk dismissed the controversy related to his reporting in Syria, saying he was "writing only what he saw and heard". His ex-wife, Lara Marlowe, took exception to the use of the adjective "controversial" in his obituaries, saying "he was a prolific non-conformist in the world of journalism, whose judgments avoided jumping on the bandwagon" and, in her experience, had been "intuitive, rapid [...] and invariably right".

Similarly, the foreign correspondent for The Independent Patrick Cockburn, responding to criticisms raised in obituaries, said "Derring-do in times of war usually gets good notices from the press and from public opinion, but moral endurance is a much rarer commodity, when the plaudits are replaced by abuse, often from people who see a world divided between devils and angels and denounce anybody reporting less than angelic behaviour on the part of the latter for being secret sympathisers with the devil." Cockburn wrote that Fisk, better than anyone else, could "find out significant news as fast as possible, disregard all efforts by governments, armies and media to suppress it, and pass that information on to the public so they can better judge what is happening in the world around them".

=== On journalism and politics ===
Fisk described himself as a pacifist and non-voter. He said that journalism must "challenge authority, all authority, especially so when governments and politicians take us to war". He quoted, with approval, the words of Israeli journalist Amira Hass: "There is a misconception that journalists can be objective. ... What journalism is really about is to monitor power and the centres of power." In light of his earlier training as a journalist on the Newcastle Evening Chronicle, he said, "I had a suspicion that the language we were forced to write as trainee reporters all those years ago had somehow imprisoned us, that we had been schooled to mould the world and ourselves in clichés, that for the most part this would define our lives, destroy our anger and imagination, make us loyal to our betters, to governments, to authority. For some reason, I had become possessed of the belief that the blame for our failure as journalists to report the Middle East with any sense of moral passion or indignation lay in the way that we as journalists were trained." In an interview with the BBC in 2005, he articulated this position further: "If you believe that victims should have more of a say than people who commit atrocities, then yes, I take a definite position. If reporters don't do that then they are out of their minds."

On coverage of foreign reporting, he said in a 2006 interview with Harry Kreisler of the Institute of International Studies at UC Berkeley: "the French are very good at getting to the scene and reporting the reality. I know France doesn't have a very clean reputation in American politics at the moment but my goodness, they've got good journalists. You read a translation of Libération, Figaro, Le Monde—they've got it. I work a lot with French. I normally work on my own, but if I work with other reporters, I tend to report with Italians or the French because, my goodness, they get to the war front."

Speaking on "Lies, Misreporting, and Catastrophe in the Middle East" at the First Congregational Church of Berkeley on 22 September 2010, Fisk said: "I think it is the duty of a foreign correspondent to be neutral and unbiased on the side of those who suffer, whoever they may be." He wrote at length on how many contemporary conflicts had their origins, in his view, in lines drawn on maps: "After the Allied victory of 1918, at the end of my father's war, the victors divided up the lands of their former enemies. In the space of just seventeen months, they created the borders of Northern Ireland, Yugoslavia and most of the Middle East. And I have spent my entire career—in Belfast and Sarajevo, in Beirut and Baghdad—watching the people within those borders burn."

=== Armenian genocide ===
Fisk wrote extensively about the Armenian genocide of 1915 and supported moves to persuade the Turkish government to acknowledge it.

=== Remembrance Day ===
For Remembrance Day in 2011, Fisk wrote that his father "old Bill Fisk became very ruminative about the Great War. He learned that Haig had lied, that he himself had fought for a world that betrayed him, that 20,000 British dead on the first day of the Somme—which he mercifully avoided because his first regiment, the Cheshires, sent him to Dublin and Cork to deal with another 1916 "problem"—was a trashing of human life. In hospital and recovering from cancer, I asked him once why the Great War was fought. 'All I can tell you, fellah,' he said, 'was that it was a great waste.' And he swept his hand from left to right. Then he stopped wearing his poppy. I asked him why, and he said that he didn't want to see 'so many damn fools' wearing it." He returned to the subject in 2014, writing: "My family was haunted by my father's experience on the Somme and the loss of his friends. Why do we pay homage to the dead but ignore the lessons of their war?" In 2016, he said: "His example was one of great courage. He fought for his country and then, unafraid, he threw his poppy away. Television celebrities do not have to fight for their country—yet they do not even have the guts to break this fake conformity and toss their sordid poppies in the office waste paper bin."

== Personal life ==
Fisk married American-born journalist Lara Marlowe in 1994. They divorced in 2006. At the time of his death, he was married to Nelofer Pazira, an Afghan-Canadian journalist, author and human rights activist.

On settling down, he wrote in 2005: "I told the journalism students there [at City, University of London] that when I saw families walking happily in London or Paris, I wondered whether I had not missed out on life, that perhaps comparative safety and security with nothing more than the mortgage to worry about was preferable to the existence I had chosen for myself. A friend of my father's once said I had enjoyed the privilege of seeing things that no other man had seen. But after a flood of questions from students in Sydney about suffering in the Middle East, I began to wonder if my privilege had not also been my curse."

== Death ==
On 30 October 2020, Fisk died aged 74 at St. Vincent's University Hospital in Dublin, Ireland, after a suspected stroke. Due to the Irish government's COVID-19 restrictions, his funeral was held privately.

Irish president Michael D. Higgins said, "with his passing the world of journalism and informed commentary on the Middle East has lost one of its finest commentators". Taoiseach Micheál Martin said, "he was fearless and independent in his reporting, with a deeply researched understanding of the complexities of the Middle East, eastern history and politics".

The Australian antiwar journalist John Pilger said: "Robert Fisk has died. I pay warmest tribute to one of the last great reporters. The weasel word 'controversial' appears in even his own paper, The Independent, whose pages he honoured. He went against the grain and told the truth, spectacularly. Journalism has lost the bravest." Former Leader of the UK Labour Party Jeremy Corbyn eulogised him on Twitter, writing, "So sad to hear of the death of Robert Fisk. A huge loss of a brilliant man with unparalleled knowledge of history, politics and people of Middle East." The Greek politician and economic theorist Yanis Varoufakis also posted a eulogy on Twitter, writing, "With Robert Fisk's passing we have lost a journalistic eye without which we shall be partially blind, a pen without which our capacity to express the truth is diminished, a soul without which our own empathy for victims of imperialism will be lacking." Christian Broughton, the managing director of The Independent, said: "Fearless, uncompromising, determined and utterly committed to uncovering the truth and reality at all costs, Robert Fisk was the greatest journalist of his generation. The fire he lit at The Independent will burn on." Harry Browne wrote in Jacobin: "Robert Fisk's voice was everywhere, and his ideas were vital in both creating and meeting that Irish urge for explanation." The Irish Times obituary read: "He used to explain his rejection of conventional journalistic detachment by saying: 'If you watch wars, the old ideas of journalism that you have to be neutral and take nobody's side is rubbish. As a journalist, you have got to be neutral and unbiased on the side of those who suffer." Former Chartered Institute of Journalists president Liz Justice wrote: "I knew him as a very detailed and knowledgeable journalist. My friend had to edit his work from 2,000 words to 400 and we have very different views involving eggshells and walking carefully. We both agree he will be missed." Richard Falk, in an interview with CounterPunch, said: "Fisk's departure from the region left a journalistic gap that has not been filled. It is important to appreciate that there are few war correspondents in the world that combine Fisk's reporting fearlessness with his interpretative depth, engaging writing style, and candid exposures of the foibles of the high and mighty."

== Memoir ==
Love in a Time of War, a memoir by Fisk's first wife, Lara Marlowe, was published in 2021. It covers the years from 1988 to 2003, the period Fisk and Marlowe worked together.

== Awards, honours and degrees ==
Fisk received the British Press Awards' International Journalist of the Year seven times, and twice won its "Reporter of the Year" award. He also received Amnesty International UK Media Awards in 1992 for his report "The Other Side of the Hostage Saga", in 1998 for his reports from Algeria and again in 2000 for his articles on the NATO air campaign against the FRY in 1999.

- 1984 Lancaster University honorary degree
- 1991 Jacob's Award for coverage of the Gulf War on RTÉ Radio 1
- 1994 Foreign Reporter of the Year at the British Press Awards for coverage on Algeria, the Hebron massacre, and Bosnia
- 1995 Foreign Reporter of the Year at the British Press Awards
- 1999 Orwell Prize for journalism
- 2001 David Watt Prize for an investigation of the 1915 Armenian genocide by the Ottoman Empire
- 2002 Martha Gellhorn Prize for Journalism
- 2003 Open University honorary doctorate
- 2004 University of St Andrews honorary degree
- 2004 Golden Doves for Peace, IRIAD
- 2004 Carleton University honorary degree
- 2005 University of Adelaide Edward Said Memorial lecture
- 2006 Ghent University honorary degree Political and Social Sciences
- 2006 American University of Beirut honorary degree
- 2006 Queen's University Belfast honorary degree
- 2006 Lannan Cultural Freedom Prize worth $350,000
- 2008 University of Kent honorary degree
- 2008 Trinity College Dublin honorary doctorate
- 2009 College Historical Society's Gold Medal for Outstanding Contribution to Public Discourse
- 2009 Liverpool Hope University honorary degree
- 2011 International Prize at the Amalfi Coast Media Awards, Italy

== Bibliography ==
- The Point of No Return: The Strike Which Broke the British in Ulster (1975). London: Times Books/Deutsch. ISBN 0-233-96682-X
- In Time of War: Ireland, Ulster and the Price of Neutrality, 1939–1945 (2001). London: Gill & Macmillan. ISBN 0-7171-2411-8 (1st ed. 1983).
- Pity the Nation: Lebanon at War (3rd ed. 2001). London: Oxford University Press; xxi, 727 pages. ISBN 0-19-280130-9 (1st ed. was 1990).
- The Great War for Civilisation: The Conquest of the Middle East (October 2005) London. Fourth Estate; xxvi, 1366 pages. ISBN 1-84115-007-X
- The Age of the Warrior: Selected Writings (2008) London, Fourth Estate ISBN 978-0-00-727073-6
- Robert Fisk on Algeria: Why Algeria's Tragedy Matters (2013) Independent Print Limited ISBN 9781633533677
- Night of Power: The Betrayal of the Middle East (2024) Fourth Estate Ltd ISBN 9780007350612
