= Time for Kids =

American children's magazine

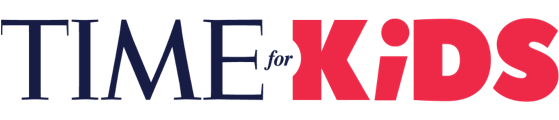

- Cover of the March 22, 2013, issue
- Categories: Children's magazine
- First issue: 1995; 31 years ago
- Website: www.timeforkids.com

Time for Kids (or TFK) is a division magazine of Time magazine that is produced especially for children. The magazine was established in 1995. It contains some national news, a "Cartoon of the Week", and other features in its weekly eight pages. The headquarters was in Tampa, Florida. Later it began to be published in New York City. It is distributed in various schools across the United States.

The magazine also runs special edition issues, and a website which offers daily news coverage and is the home of the TFK "Kid Reporter" program.

There is a TFK edition of the trivia game Don't Quote Me, which has won several awards.

== See also ==
- Time for Kids Almanac
