= Infinite Armies =

Card game

Create, customize, challenge
- Designers: Greg Porter
- Publishers: Blacksburg Tactical Research Center
- Publication: 2005
- Genres: collectible card game
- Players: Two
- Setup time: < 3 minutes^{1}
- Playing time: ~ 20 minutes
- Chance: Low
- Age range: 11+
- Skills: Card playing
- ^{1} Game setup may take much longer when players first develop their cards.

Infinite Armies is a customizable card game for two players. It was created by Greg Porter, and published in 2005 by Blacksburg Tactical Research Center. It follows on the success of the collectible card game genre, but establishes its own niche by allowing players to fully design, customize, and print their own cards. Whether this is a viable business concept is still being tested, as most card games rely heavily on sales of cards and the continued publication of new cards.

The heart of the game is a PDF file called iArmy Builder, which uses the functions of the Adobe Acrobat program to allow players to create and print their own cards using any graphics files they like. The first versions focused on traditional modern armies, with tanks, infantry, airpower, etc. But in theory, a player may base their cards on any idea they like, such as spacecraft, fantasy, cartoon characters, or even photos of friends and family.

== Reception ==
The game won the 2005 Origins Vanguard Award for new gaming concept. It is the first PDF-only game to win an Origins award.
