= Macho Women with Guns =

Tabletop role-playing game

- 1st edition, cover art by Mark E. Rogers
- Designers: Greg Porter
- Publishers: Blacksburg Tactical Research Center
- Publication: 1988 (1st edition) 1994 (2nd edition) 2003 (d20 version)
- Genres: Comedy
- Systems: custom

Macho Women with Guns (MWWG) is a comedy role-playing game originally created by Greg Porter and published by Blacksburg Tactical Research Center (BTRC). Nominally a science-fiction game, it parodies action films, how "strong female characters" are depicted in such films, and the tropes of popular violence-heavy role-playing games.

== Setting ==
Macho Women with Guns is set in a near-future America where society has collapsed due to the misdeeds of the Reagan administration. Taking advantage of the earthly chaos, Satan has dispatched her female minions, the Batwinged Bimbos From Hell, to rebuild society in a form she approves of. The Vatican has responded to Satan's plans by dispatching its elite group of warrior nuns, The Sisters of Our Lady of Harley-Davidson to combat the bimbos. The two groups of women compete (sometimes violently) to rebuild civilization by vanquishing post-apocalyptic menaces and male chauvinism.

Dimensional warps caused by the conflict have opened connections to a series of parallel universes, each of which represents a different genre environment such as fantasy, Lovecraftian horror or science fiction. These universes, along with Earth, constitute a campaign setting that Macho Women with Guns calls The Machoverse.

Player characters in Macho Women with Guns are buxom women with a penchant for revealing clothing who engage in combat with otherworldly menaces like the Puppies of Tindalos (a reference to the Hounds of Tindalos), satirical representations of male chauvinism such as Drunken Frat Boys, and occasionally each other. Non-women opponents in the game are usually referred to as critters.

== System ==
Character generation in Macho Women with Guns uses a character point system. Each character begins with 75 points which are used to buy attributes and skills. The five attributes (Strength, Dexterity, Macho, Looks, and Health; notably, there is no Intelligence attribute) are rated on an open-ended scale with a minimum starting score of eight. Skills are ranked by the bonus they provide to task resolution roles, i.e. "+1", "+2", etc.

MWWG uses a roll of three six-sided dice for all task resolutions, including combat. The base chance of a character succeeding at an action is determined by the character's score in a relevant attribute (usually Strength or Dexterity), adjusted by situational modifiers (including skills) determined by the gamemaster. The player of that character then rolls three six-sided dice—If the sum of the dice is less than or equal to the adjusted number, the character succeeds at the action. Most dice rolls in Macho Women with Guns use six-sided dice, but four-sided and three-sided dice may be needed for some rolls.

A signature mechanic of Macho Women with Guns is the Macho Attack, which allows a player character to intimidate their enemies with a display of raw charisma by making a roll against their character's Macho score. The opponent then rolls against their Macho score (with modifiers determined by the player character's roll). An opponent who fails their Macho roll is temporarily stunned by the player character, and unable to act.

== History ==
The original Macho Women with Guns was designed in 1988 by Greg Porter, owner of BTRC, in a period of less than two weeks. The 12-page booklet was published in August of that year, and became BTRC's most popular product. selling 10,000 copies.

The following year, BTRC released two supplements written by Porter. The first, Batwinged Bimbos From Hell (ISBN 0-943891-08-6), introduced key background details of the Machoverse, as well as rules for aerial movement. The second supplement, Renegade Nuns on Wheels (ISBN 0-943891-07-8), featured more information about the campaign setting, and rules for ground vehicles. Especially in the vehicular damage system, it parodied the flow chart-approach of Renegade Legion's Interceptor.

BTRC also released a slightly revised version of the original rule booklet (ISBN 0-943891-06-X), which included cross-references to the new supplements. Although the inside cover of the revised booklet identifies it as "Second Edition, May 1989", there were no major rules changes. (Few, if any, gamers acknowledge this booklet as a different edition.) Porter's collection of adventures for MWWG, The Final Chapter (Part One) (ISBN 0-943891-12-4) was published in 1990. In 1991 Finnish Game House released a Finnish translation titled Aseistetut machonaiset.

In 1994, BTRC published a 70-page softcover book entitled Macho Women with Guns (2nd Edition) (ISBN 0-943891-27-2), which combined and expanded material from the four earlier books (Porter 1994a). It was supported by a single collection of adventures published in 1995, More Excuses to Kill Things. (ISBN 0-943891-31-0) BTRC has not published any new MWWG material since 1994, but eight other game companies have produced products under license from BTRC.

The first licensed products to appear were translations for overseas markets, some of which added new material. In 1992 Italian publisher Granata Press published Maschiacce armate pesantemente [Heavily-Armed Tomboys] and the two supplements SuoCeR - Suore Centaure Rinnegate and PAPI - Pupe con Ali di Pipistrello dall'Inferno on its role-playing games magazine Kaos, with new artwork by famed comic artist Giuseppe Palumbo and Romeo Gallo. In 1995 Nexus Editrice collected them in a book together with an additional adventure (ISBN 88-86149-08-5) and in 1996 Qualitygame released a small "Pochettravel EditionTM" with the MWWG original rulebook only. In 1994 Brazilian game company Devir Livraria Limitada released a Portuguese translation (Porter 1994b) titled Mulheres Machonas Armadas até os Dentes [Macho Women Armed to the Teeth]. German publisher Spielzeit released an 84-page translation using the title Macho Weiber Mit Dicken Kanonen [Macho Broads with Big Guns].

In August 1998, Archangel Entertainment released Fun Guys from Yuggoth: The Macho Women Card Game (a pun on H. P. Lovecraft's science fiction/horror sonnet cycle "The Fungi from Yuggoth"), and its one supplement, A Fistful of Cardboard: Fun Guys from Yuggoth Expansion.

Two companies produced licensed gaming miniatures for Macho Women with Guns. Simtac LLC created a line of metal miniatures. [TMP] Macho Women with Guns In 2001, Cumberland Games began distributing a TrueType font that allows gamers to print an unlimited supply of paper figures for use in Macho Women with Guns.

In 2002, French gaming company Le Septième Cercle released a 112-page French-language version of the 1994 rules. The French version retains the English title.

In August 2003, Mongoose Publishing produced a d20 System version of Macho Women with Guns (ISBN 1-904577-33-4), written by James Desborough and Nathan Webb. Three supplements (only available in PDF format) are available for the d20 version of the game: Macho Women with Guns - Diet Edition, Adolf Hitler - Porn Star, and The Sex Presidents.

== Reception ==
In his 1990 book The Complete Guide to Role-Playing Games, game critic Rick Swan called it "a game you will never play with your grandma." Swan liked it, commenting, "Though there are less than ten pages of rules, Macho Women is a slick little game, complete with brief but adequate combat rules." Swan concluded by giving the game a good rating of 3 out of 4, saying, "The game walks a fine line between satire and adolescent sexism ... but overall Macho Women with Guns is so good-natured that its lapses are easy to forgive."

Matthew Lane reviewed Macho Women with Guns 3rd edition in White Wolf Inphobia #52 (Feb., 1995), rating it a 4 out of 5 and stated that "The game's well worth the money. Not only is it good for releasing life's daily frustrations, but where else can you get babes and guns for only [this price]?"

In Issue 87 of the French games magazine Casus Belli, Tristan Lhomme reviewed the French translation and complained that the humor sometimes did not carry over, saying, "the booklet is full of muddy and difficult to translate puns." However, Lhomme liked the game, commenting, "Managing to go crazy for around sixty pages while writing a playable role-playing game is quite a feat... and [game designer] Porter did it perfectly. MMWG is undoubtedly Toon's only serious competitor, in a slightly more specialized category."

The French games magazine Backstab reviewed the French translation and commented, "Personally I love it: if you were already a fan you will be happy to read it in French, and if you come along you will be in for a nice surprise." The reviewer concluded, "In short, hours of laughter. Read it, play it, but also convince your players to try the experience! ... You know what you have to do, decadent male."

== Other recognition ==
A copy of Macho Women with Guns is held in the collection of the Strong National Museum of Play (object 110.3191).

== Bibliography ==
- Gamewyrd: Interview with Greg Porter, retrieved June 4, 2006
- Guide du Rôliste Galactique: Macho Women with Guns, retrieved June 4, 2006
- Mongoose Publishing: Macho Women with Guns, retrieved June 4, 2006
- Nexus Games: Maschiacce Armate Pesantemente, retrieved June 6, 2006
- Porter, Greg 1994a. "Macho Women, 2nd edition is here!", rec.games.frp.misc
- Porter, Greg 1994b. "Macho Women w/Guns in Brasil", rec.games.frp.misc
- Sparks: Macho Women with Guns, retrieved June 4, 2006
- The Miniatures Page: Macho Women with Guns, retrieved June 4, 2006
