= Time for Kids Almanac =

Time for Kids Almanac is a yearly almanac which was published in the United States by Meredith Corporation as an adjunct to their Time for Kids magazine. The last edition was published in 2016.

The almanac, aimed at elementary school and middle school students (grades 3 - 8 in the United States), includes articles on science, art, literature, social studies, technology, politics, pop culture, history, language, mathematics, economics, religion, sports, and volunteering. The reference book begins with the "Year in Review," which tells of events that have taken place in the prior year, and ends with "What's Next?" which describes interesting or significant events expected in the coming year.

The series has won many honors, including the Teacher's Choice Award, Best Children's Reference Book Award, and the "A-List" pick from FamilyFun magazine.
