= Hex Hex =

2003 fantasy card game

- Designers: Curt Covert
- Publishers: Smirk & Dagger Games; Mad Man's Magic
- Publication: 2003; 23 years ago
- Genres: Card game
- Players: 3–6
- Playing time: 30 minutes
- Age range: 12+

Hex Hex is a fantasy card game designed by Curt Covert and published by Smirk & Dagger Games in 2003. Players play cards to counter or deflect point-stealing hexes sent to them by other players, in order to gain the most points by the end of the game.

== Publishing history ==
Hex Hex was first released in 2003. The game was designed by Curt Coven and was the first game published by his publishing company Smirk & Dagger Games. In 2005, Hex Hex Next, a stand-alone expansion adding new cards and mechanics, was published. The next year, a revised version of the core game titled Hex Hex 1.5 was released for retail, adding new cards and more tokens. A German-language version of the same name was published in 2006 by Mad Man's Magic.

In 2009, the Smirk & Dagger Games ran out of stock of Hex Hex and the game did not return to print. They published the expansion Hex Hex XL as the new core game in 2010, adding a streamlined ruleset and deck of cards, as well as two new game variants: Hexed and Hexen Stix. Around 2017, printing of Hex Hex XL was retired.

Following a successful Kickstarter campaign, Smirk & Dagger Games released Behext in 2023, a deck-builder designed by Jonathan Lavallee, Greg Millikin, and Melodee Smith based on Hex Hex.

== Gameplay ==
All players start with 5 Voices, a measure a player's influence within the group. One player is selected to be the first caster and a special caster token is placed in front of them. The first caster deals out 5 cards to each player and sends a hex token to a player of their choice, known as The Intended. The Intended must get rid of the hex by playing their cards, which allow them to counter, deflect, or split the hex. If a player fails to rid themselves of the hex, they are "hexed". If the hexed player fails to diffuse the hex by playing their cards, it detonates and they lose one Voice to whichever player was The Intended in the previous round. Once the hex is detonated, the game progresses to the next round and continues as before, with the new first caster being player to the left of the last. Some cards can only be played in certain cases, such as immediately when it is drawn or when the player has been hexed.

The game ends after each player has been the first caster twice. The player with the most Voice wins.

== Reception ==
John Belden for The Daily Reporter said of the first version of Hex Hex, "We all enjoyed the devious nature of the game. Play was fast and fun, with rules easy to understand. The only downside is that the game only supplies a flimsy cardboard chip to use as a voice counter. Getting out some buttons or glass beads might work better." Steven Marsh, writing for Pyramid, described it as "combin[ing] the speed and accessibility of Uno with a vengeance and unpredictability that ensures no two games will look alike." Jörg Domberger, a play tester for Austrian games website Spieletest.at, rated Hex Hex 1.5 a 4/10, praising the game's visual design but criticizing the version's gaps in the rules and its "less-than-ideal rulebook". In an article for Wired, Jonathan H. Liu described Hex Hex XL as "a great, simple-to-learn game that results in a lot of hilarity," but thought it would be less appealing to groups looking for serious strategy or with less than five players.

Hex Hex XL was a finalist for the Best Traditional Card Game award of the 37th Origins Awards in 2011.
