= Ann Elizabeth Mayer =

Ann Elizabeth Mayer is an associate professor of legal studies in the department of legal studies and business ethics at the Wharton School of the University of Pennsylvania.

== Biography ==
Mayer has taught law courses on subjects comprising law and policy in international business, globalization and human rights, introductions to U.S. law, comparative law, and Islamic law in contemporary Middle Eastern legal systems.

She earned a B.A. in honors German from the University of Michigan in 1964; a M.A. in Near Eastern languages and literatures (Arabic and Persian) from the University of Michigan in 1966; a J.D. from the University of Pennsylvania Law School in 1975; a certificate in Islamic and comparative law from the University of London in 1977 and in 1978 a Ph.D. in Middle Eastern history from the University of Michigan.

== Research areas ==
Mayer has written widely on issues of Islamic law in contemporary legal systems, comparative law, international law, and the problems of integrating international human rights law in domestic legal systems. A major portion of her scholarship concerns human rights issues in contemporary North Africa and the Middle East. She has published extensively in law reviews and in scholarly journals and books concerned with comparative and international law and politics in contemporary Middle East and North Africa.

Her interest in international human rights law encompasses the emergence of new ideas of corporate responsibility under international human rights law and problems concerning the transferral of former state obligations to private actors. She consults widely on cases involving human rights issues and Middle Eastern law, being a member of the Pennsylvania Bar.

== Publications (selection) ==
- The Internationalization of Religiously Based Resistance to International Human Rights Law, in Global Justice and the Bulwarks of Localism: Human Rights in Context, Christopher L. Eisgruber and Andras Sajo, eds. (Martinus Nijhoff Publishers, 2005).
- The Evolution of the Concept of Human Rights, in Islam and Human Rights: Advancing a U.S.-Muslim Dialogue, Shireen Hunter, ed. with Huma Malik (Center for Strategic and International Studies 2005).
- Shifting Grounds for Challenging the Authority of International Human Rights Law: Religion as a Malleable and Politicized Pretext for Governmental Noncompliance with Human Rights, in Human Rights with Modesty: The Problem of Universalism, Andras Sajo, ed., Martinus Nijhoff, 2004.
- Internationalization of the Conversation on Women's Rights: Arab Governments Face the CEDAW Committee in Islamic Law and the Challenge of Modernity, Yvonne Haddad and Barbara Freyer Stowasser, eds., Altamira Press, 2004.
- Le religioni monoteiste e i diritti umani: una relazione contestata, [The monotheistic religions and human rights: A contested relationship] in Le tre religioni de Abramo. Visioni di Dio e valore dell'uomo, Antonio Rigo, ed., Marsilio, 2003.
- Die Konvention über die Beseitigung jeder Form von Diskriminierung der Frau (CEDAW) und der politische Charakter 'religiöser' Vorbehalte, in Facetten islamischer Welten. Geschlechterordnungen, Frauen- und Menschenrechte in der Diskussion, Ute Gerhard, Mechtild Rumpf, and Mechtild M. Jansen, eds. (Bielefeld: Transcript Verlag, 2003). Translation of an expanded and updated version of a chapter
- Religious Reservations to CEDAW: What Do They Really Mean? previously published in Religious Fundamentalisms and the Human Rights of Women, 1999.
- Islamic Law as a Cure for Political Law: The Withering of an Islamist Illusion. 7 Mediterranean Politics, (Autumn 2002), also published in Shaping the Current Islamic Reformation, Barbara A. Roberson, ed., Frank Cass, 2003.
- Conundrums in Constitutionalism: Islamic Monarchies in an Era of Transition, 1 UCLA Journal of Islamic and Near Eastern Law, (Spring/Summer 2002).
- A Benign Apartheid: How Gender Apartheid Has Been Rationalized. 5 UCLA Journal of International Law and Foreign Affairs (2000–2001). A shorter version of this was translated into Persian as
- Tab `iz-e jensi-ye va hoquq-e bashar dar Iran, 19 Iran Nameh (Winter and Spring 2001).
- The Universality of Human Rights: Lessons from the Islamic Republic of Iran, 67 Social Research (Summer 2000) - a special issue titled Iran Since the Revolution.

== Short articles, chapters, and reviews (selection) ==
- Book review of International Human Rights and Islamic Law in 99 American Journal of International Law (2005).
- Islamic Declaration, in The Essential Guide to Human Rights, Christien van den Anker and Rhona Smith, eds. (Hodder Arnold, 2005).
- "Islam, Menschenrechte und Geschlecht: Tradition und Politik", in Geschlechter Differenzen in Islamischen Kontexten, Ute Gerhard, Mechthild Rumpf, and Ulla Wischermann, eds., 21 Feministische Studien, n.2 (2003). Translation of a paper given at a conference at the University of Frankfurt on October 19, 2002, on Islam, Gender, and Human Rights.
- Book review of Human Rights in Iran: The Abuse of Cultural Relativism, 36 Iranian Studies (September 2003).
- Book review of The Rule of Law in the Middle East and the Islamic World: Human Rights and the Judicial Process, 26 Human Rights Quarterly (February 2004).
- Substantial contributions to the exchanges on women's rights in Iran that have been edited and published as "Women in Iran: An Online Discussion," 8 Middle East Policy (December 2001).
- Minority Rights in Multiethnic and Multiracial States, in Democracy and the Rule of Law, Norman Dorsen and Prosser Gifford, eds. (Library of Congress: Washington DC, 2001).
