= The Great War for Civilisation =

Nonfiction book by Robert Fisk

The Great War for Civilisation: The Conquest of the Middle East
- The dust jacket of the 2005 UK edition
- Author: Robert Fisk
- Language: English
- Genre: History, current affairs
- Publisher: Fourth Estate
- Publication date: 2005
- Publication place: England
- Media type: Print (hardback & paperback) & Audio book
- Pages: 1107
- ISBN: 1-4000-7517-3
- OCLC: 84904295

The Great War for Civilisation: The Conquest of the Middle East is a book published in 2005 by the English journalist Robert Fisk. The book is based on many of the articles Fisk wrote when he was serving as a correspondent in the Middle East for The Times and The Independent. The book revolves around several key themes regarding the history of the modern Middle East: the Arab–Israeli conflict, the Soviet invasion of Afghanistan, the Gulf Wars, the Algerian Civil War, as well as other regional topics such as the Armenian genocide. The Great War for Civilisation is the second book Fisk has written about the Middle East. The first one, Pity the Nation, (Nation Books, 2002) was about the Lebanese Civil War.

Fisk's book details his travels to many of the hotspots of the Middle East, such as Iraq and Iran during the Iran–Iraq War, and his numerous interviews with leaders and ordinary people. Fisk also provides much of the historical context to these conflicts.

In the book, Fisk criticizes what he perceives as the hypocritical and biased British and United States foreign policy in the Middle East, especially in regard to the Arab–Israeli conflict and the 2003 invasion of Iraq. He contends that the leaders of both countries deliberately misled the world about their motivations for invading Iraq in 2003.

The name of the book comes from a campaign medal Fisk's father was awarded for his services in the First World War. The aftermath of World War I saw the creation of most of the borders of the modern Middle East, after the partitioning of the Ottoman Empire.

== Contents ==
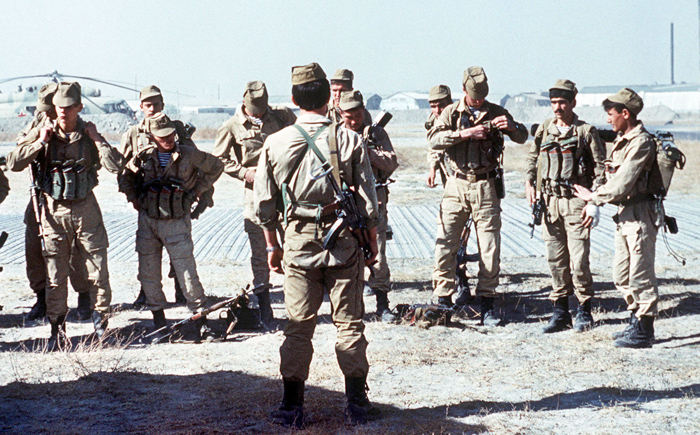
The first two chapters of the book focus on Fisk's first hand accounts of the first year of the Soviet–Afghan War. Above, Soviet Spetsnaz prepare for a military operation.

1. "One of Our Brothers Had a Dream..." is about Fisk's first interview in 1996 with the leader of al-Qaeda, Osama bin Laden, in the mountains of Afghanistan. The title of the chapter is derived from bin Laden who explains that one of his fighters had a dream of Fisk, wearing a robe and with a beard, and who was approaching them on a horse, signifying that he was, according to bin Laden, a "true Muslim". Fisk understood this relating of the dream as an attempt by bin Laden to convert him to Islam.

2. They Shoot Russians is on the 1980 Soviet invasion of Afghanistan where Fisk chronicles much of the problems the Soviet Union faced in dealing with the Afghan mujahideen when they entered the country as well as the invasion's galvanizing effect in recruiting thousands of foreign Muslim fighters to the country and the resurgence of Islamic extremism in the country.

3. The Choirs of Kandahar is essentially a continuation of Chapter 2.

4. The Carpet-Weavers begins with the CIA and MI6's successful 1953 Iranian coup d'état, the overthrowing of the democratically elected prime minister of Iran, Mohammed Mosaddeq. From there, it moves on to the events leading up to and following the Iranian Revolution of 1979 which deposed Mohammad Reza Pahlavi.

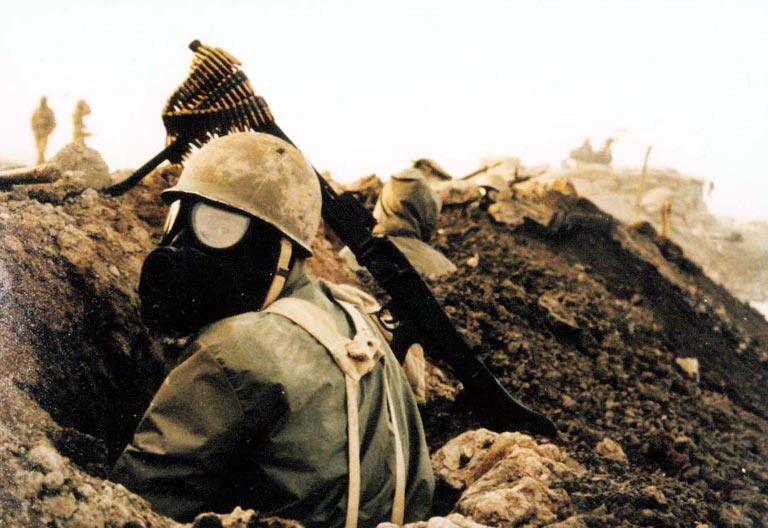
An Iranian soldier wearing a gas mask during the Iran–Iraq War.

5–8. The Path to War and the subsequent chapters The Whirlwind War, War Against War and the Fast Train to Paradise and Drinking the Poisoned Chalice deal with Baathist Iraq, the battles of the Iran-Iraq of the 1980s (including the Tanker War), Iran's use of human wave attacks, Saddam's use of chemical weapons against Iran, the roles of the US and other Western governments in the conflict, and the conclusion of the war.

9. Sentenced to Suffer Death is Fisk's account of his father, Bill Fisk, during his service in the British Army during World War I and his difficult decision to refuse to take part as a member of a firing squad ordered to execute another soldier.

10. The First Holocaust is devoted to the topic of the Armenian genocide. Its title is derived from the fact that the Genocide, organized by the government of the Ottoman Empire, took place in 1915, several decades before the Jewish Holocaust. In it, Fisk provides the historical context of the Armenian Genocide and includes his numerous interviews with survivors of the Genocide living in Lebanon and Armenia. Fisk strongly criticizes the denialist stance of the Turkish government, the successor to the Ottoman Empire, as well as the governments of Israel and the UK for refusing to recognize the massacres and deportations as genocide.

11–13. Fifty Thousand Miles from Palestine and the subsequent chapters The Last Colonial War and The Girl and the Child and Love are devoted to the Arab-Israeli conflict from the 1980s onward. The chapters deal with the deaths of civilians on both sides, suicide bombings and the Israeli government's treatment of Palestinian people. Much of these chapters also detail with media coverage of the conflict and the terms used by them to describe both sides, most notably the word "terrorist".

14. Anything to Wipe Out a Devil... briefly focuses on the Algerian War and the use of torture and terrorism by both the French military and FLN in the 1954–1962 war. After the French pullout and Algerian independence, the book details the internal power struggles among the secular and Islamist factions and continues on with this theme into the Algerian Civil War which began in 1991.

15. Planet Damnation gives an eyewitness report of the Gulf War. Fisk was stationed in the desert with the Allied forces and makes references both to the retreat of Iraqi troops from Kuwait and their subsequent slaughter by air bombardment on the Highway of Death during the Gulf War air campaign.

16. Betrayal describes the repression of the 1991 uprisings in Iraq by the Iraqi government, which had been encouraged but not supported by George H. W. Bush and the CIA.

17. The Land of Graves. The pun in the chapter's title points at the repercussions that the United Nations sanctions against Iraq had on the civilian population.

18. The Plague deals with the unusual illnesses which plagued the Iraqi public after the war.

19. Now Thrive the Armourers... is an incursion into the world of the manufacturers of "all nationalities, all faiths, all follies, all causes and all crimes," of the arms trade.

20. Even to Kings, He Comes... is an analysis of the deeds of King Hussein of Jordan and President Hafez al-Assad of Syria. The first, a controversial ruler, whose subjects were both acclaiming him and shrieking at his coffin during his burial ceremony, is put alongside "The Lion of Damascus", whose Hama massacre is looked into.

21. Why ? tries to find an explanation for the September 11, 2001, attacks.

22. The Die Is Cast examines the diplomatic and mass media moves which led to Operation Iraqi Freedom.

23. Atomic Dog, Annihilator, Arsonist, Anthrax, Anguish and Agamemnon describes in great detail the turbulences which have accompanied the occupation of Iraq and its capital, Baghdad.

24. Into the Wilderness is the last chapter of the book. It gives an idea of the challenges the Coalition Provisional Authority has faced in Iraq, and reports on the assassination of the Lebanese Prime-Minister Rafiq Hariri, witnessed by Fisk.

The book ends, as it has begun, in the "tiny village of Louvencourt, on the Somme," where Robert Fisk's father fought. This is not only meant as a homage to Bill Fisk, but is also an implicit reminder of one of the leitmotifs of the book: the volatile situation in the Middle East is a consequence of the political arrangements concluded in the aftermath of the First World War.

The work has a Chronology of the Middle East, starting with the birth of the Prophet Mohammed and ending in 2005, the year of the book's British release, with the words: "UN Security Council Resolution 242 of 1968 – calling for Israel's withdrawal from occupied land – remains unfulfilled."

== Reviews ==
The Guardian published a review of the book by retired British Ambassador Oliver Miles, which claimed it contained mistakes about numerous matters including the Ba'ath party and Iraq's revolutions, the Balfour Declaration, locations of US bases, claiming the Hijazi Hashemites were Gulf people, wrongly assigning an Umayyad character to Baghdad, the century of Ali ibn Abi Talib's death, and the meaning of Arabic, Persian, Russian, and French words and the birthplace of Jesus.
