= Kenneth M. Pollack =

Political scientist and CIA analyst

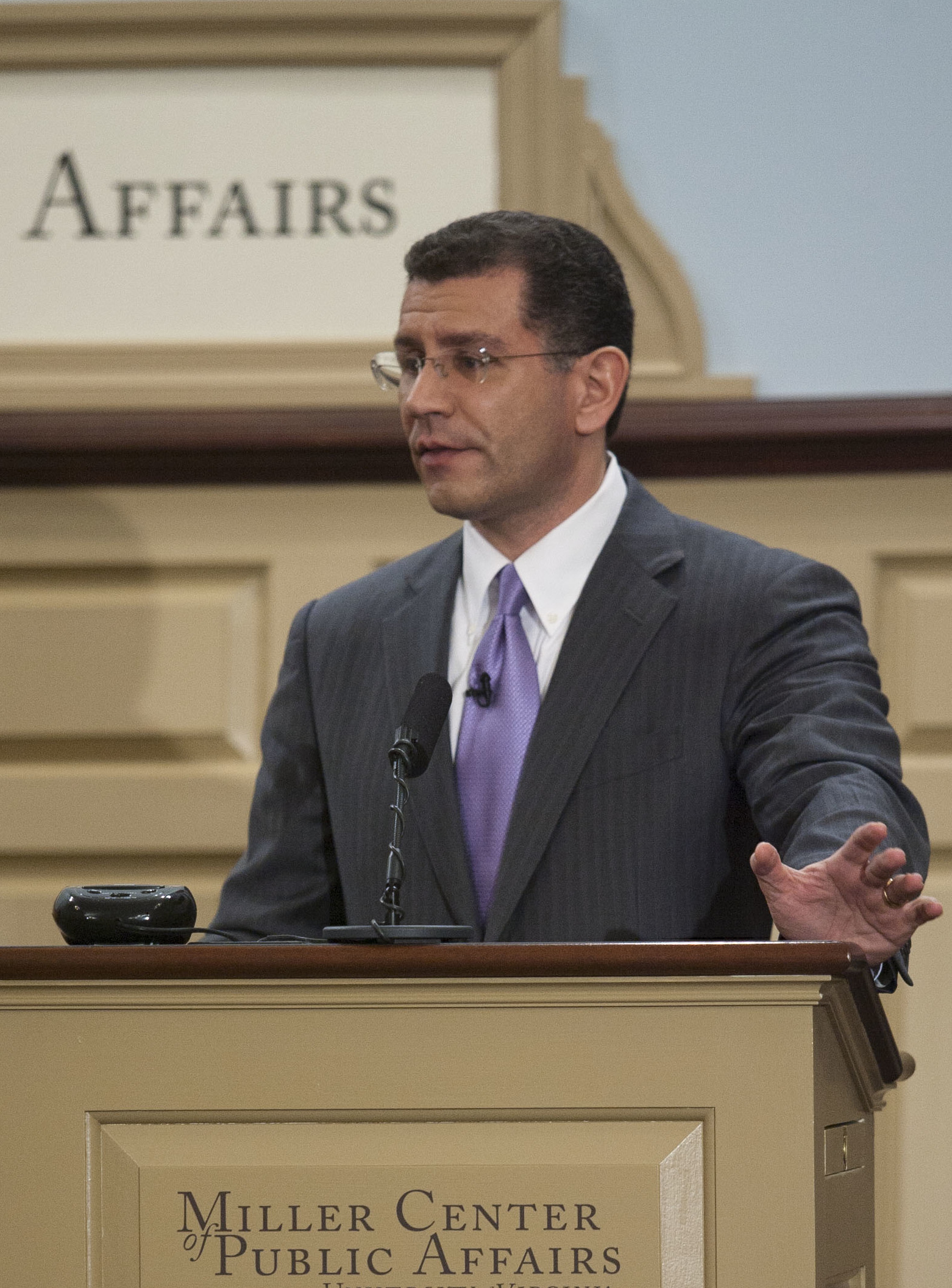
- Pollack speaking at the Miller Center of Public Affairs in 2012.
- Born: 1966 (age 59–60)
- Spouse: Andrea Koppel
- Relatives: Ted Koppel (father-in-law)

Kenneth Michael Pollack (born 1966) is an American former CIA intelligence analyst and commentator on Middle East politics and military affairs. He has served on the National Security Council staff and has written several articles and books on international relations. Currently, he is the Vice President for Policy at the Middle East Institute. He was previously a resident scholar at the American Enterprise Institute, where he worked on Middle Eastern political-military affairs, focusing in particular on Iran, Iraq, Saudi Arabia, and the Gulf countries. Before that he was Senior Fellow at the Saban Center for Middle East Policy at the Brookings Institution and a senior advisor at Albright Stonebridge Group, a global business strategy firm.

== Early life and education ==
Born to a Jewish family, Pollack obtained a BA from Yale University, in 1988, and went on to earn a PhD from MIT, under supervision of Barry Posen, in 1996.

== Personal life ==
Pollack is married to Andrea Koppel, the daughter of the well-known broadcast journalist Ted Koppel.

== Career ==
He has served in a variety of roles in government. From 1988 until 1995, he was an analyst on Iraqi and Iranian military issues for the Central Intelligence Agency. He spent a year as Director for Near East and South Asian Affairs with the United States National Security Council. In 1999, he rejoined the NSC as the Director for Persian Gulf Affairs. He also served two stints as a professor with the National Defense University.

Outside of government, he worked for the Brookings Institution as the director of research at its Saban Center for Middle East Policy. He previously worked for the Council of Foreign Relations as their director of national security studies. He has also written seven books, the first two of which were published in 2002. His first monograph, Arabs at War: Military Effectiveness 1948-1991, advanced reasons as to why Arab states had been so continuously unsuccessful at fighting Israel between World War II and the Persian Gulf War.

He currently is an adjunct professor in the Security Studies Program of Georgetown's Walsh School of Foreign Service.

=== Advocacy of Iraq invasion ===
In his second book, The Threatening Storm: The Case for Invading Iraq (pub. 2002), Pollack details the history of United States actions against Iraq since the Persian Gulf War of 1991. He says that the United States should invade Iraq, and describes ways of going about it. Pollack argued that Saddam Hussein was simply too volatile and aggressive in his policies to be trusted not to begin another conflict in a volatile region. In The Threatening Storm, Pollack argued "the only prudent and realistic course of action left to the United States is to mount a full-scale invasion of Iraq to smash the Iraqi armed forces, depose Saddam's regime, and rid the country of weapons of mass destruction." Pollack predicted, "It is unimaginable that the United States would have to contribute hundreds of billions of dollars and highly unlikely that we would have to contribute even tens of billions of dollars." Likewise, he wrote, "we should not exaggerate the danger of casualties among American troops. U.S. forces in Bosnia have not suffered a single casualty from hostile action because they have become so attentive and skillful at force protection."

Pollack is credited with persuading liberals of the case for the Iraq war. New York Times columnist Bill Keller, in supporting the Iraq war in 2003, wrote "Kenneth Pollack, the Clinton National Security Council expert whose argument for invading Iraq is surely the most influential book of this season, has provided intellectual cover for every liberal who finds himself inclining toward war but uneasy about Mr. Bush." Liberal writer Matthew Yglesias in the LA Times also attested to Pollack's influence:

Of course, those of us who read Pollack's celebrated 2002 book, "The Threatening Storm: The Case for Invading Iraq," and became convinced as a result that the United States needed to, well, invade Iraq in order to dismantle Saddam Hussein's advanced nuclear weapons program (the one he didn't actually have) might feel a little too bitter to once again defer to our betters.

Many have criticized his support for the Invasion of Iraq, including Middle East correspondent Robert Fisk, who called The Threatening Storm the "most meretricious contribution" to the pre-war "debate" on military action and included it in the select bibliography section of his 2005 book The Great War for Civilisation in order to "show just how specific – and misleading – were the efforts to persuade Americans to invade."

Many critics, as well as many of those who used the book to justify their support of the invasion, overlooked the more balanced presentation on the pros and cons of war to be found in The Threatening Storm. As Chris Suellentrop of Slate pointed out before the invasion on March 5, 2003:

Six months after The Threatening Storm's publication, however, Pollack's book reads as much like an indictment of the Bush administration's overeagerness to go to war as it does an endorsement of it. A more appropriate subtitle for the book would have been The Case for Rebuilding Afghanistan, Destroying al-Qaida, Setting Israel and Palestine on the Road to Peace, and Then, a Year or Two Down the Road After Some Diplomacy, Invading Iraq. In interviews and op-ed articles, Pollack himself still supports the war, saying that now is better than never. But it's fair to say that his book does not—or at least not Bush's path to it.

Pollack responded to the Suellentrop article by saying that he was unhappy that many people seemed to have read only the subtitle of his book, which had not been his choice. He also said:

given how far down the road the Bush Administration has taken us, I think that we have no realistic choice but to go to war this year. And yet I think the Administration has handled the diplomacy and public diplomacy of coalition building very poorly, and I am deeply concerned about the impact this will have both on postwar reconstruction and on our ability to garner allies for the inevitable next crisis.

Pollack later was a strong supporter of the Iraq War troop surge of 2007 advocated by General David Petraeus, which entailed a buildup of US ground forces to improve the security of the Iraqi population and help Iraq increase its governmental capacity, develop employment programs, and improve daily life for its citizens. He laid out some of his arguments in support of the surge in the June 2007 NY Times article "A War We Just Might Win," which was co-authored with Michael E. O'Hanlon of Brookings.

== Other publications ==
In 2004, his third book, The Persian Puzzle, was published. In contrast to his views on Iraq, in The Persian Puzzle he argued that though the threat of force is necessary in dealing with Iran, diplomacy rather than regime change by force is the best way of dealing with Iran because Iran's policy-makers are divided between pragmatists who are motivated by a desire to improve the economy and hardliners who fear U.S. attack and so seek a nuclear deterrent. The United States can thus exploit this divide to negotiate a favorable agreement. He also argued that the hardliners’ leader, Supreme Leader Ali Khamenei, was, unlike Saddam Hussein, rational and risk-averse and so, even if Iran did acquire a nuclear capability, Iran could be deterred in a way that Saddam Hussein could not be.

In 2007, Pollack co-authored the book Things Fall Apart: Containing the Spillover from an Iraqi Civil War with Daniel L. Byman. This book analyzed 12 recent civil wars to derive six common ways in which fullscale ethnic civil wars "spillover" to affect neighboring states. Pollack and Byman argued that while spillover can range from modest effects to very severe problems (like causing other civil wars or triggering regional wars among neighboring states), the early evidence so far suggested that the United States should be prepared for Iraq's potential descent into all-out civil war to be on the worse end of the spectrum. The book went on to lay out thirteen different ways that the United States and its allies might fashion a "containment" strategy for Iraq, which offered some chance of preventing all-out civil war in Iraq from destabilizing the wider Persian Gulf region in the event that American efforts to stabilize the country failed. While Pollack and Byman argued that such a containment strategy would be very difficult to make work given the historical problems of doing so and the specific problems created by previous American actions in Iraq, they also concluded that containment would likely prove America's least bad option because U.S. interests in the Persian Gulf were so important that Washington would have to try to mitigate the impact of spillover.

He has written numerous articles for publications such as the Atlantic Monthly and Foreign Affairs. He has also repeatedly testified before the Senate Foreign Relations Committee.

Pollack's fifth book, A Path Out of the Desert: A Grand Strategy for America in the Middle East, was published in July 2008. In a review in Army Magazine, former commander of Multi-National Security Transition Command-Iraq LTG James M. Dubik, US Army Retired, described the book as providing a clear description of America's vital interests in the Middle East and presenting well-documented, cogent arguments on the threats posed by the regional anger and frustration bred by crippling societal problems. Pollack recommends a grand strategy for the United States and its allies in which they

encourage and enable the countries of the Middle East to pursue a gradual process of political, economic and social reform—one that grows from within, rather than being imposed from without; one that reflects the values, traditions, history and aspirations of the people of the region themselves, not a Western guess at them; one that recognizes that reform and stability are not mutually exclusive but mutually reinforcing—and ultimately mutually essential.

== Allegation of espionage ==
A U.S. government indictment alleged that Pollack provided information to former American Israel Public Affairs Committee (AIPAC) employees Steve J. Rosen and Keith Weissman during the AIPAC espionage scandal. In April 2009, the indictment was dropped.

== Books ==
- Arabs at War: Military Effectiveness, 1948-1991, University of Nebraska Press, 2002, ISBN 0-8032-3733-2
- Threatening Storm: The Case for Invading Iraq, Random House, 2002, ISBN 0-375-50928-3
- The Persian Puzzle: The Conflict Between Iran and America, Random House, 2004, ISBN 1-4000-6315-9
- Things Fall Apart: Containing the Spillover from an Iraqi Civil War, with Daniel L. Byman, Brookings Institution Press, 2007, ISBN 0-8157-1379-7
- A Path Out of the Desert: A Grand Strategy for America in the Middle East, Random House, 2008, ISBN 1-4000-6548-8
- Unthinkable: Iran, the Bomb, and American Strategy, Simon & Schuster, 2013, ISBN 1-4767-3392-9
- Armies of Sand: The Past, Present, and Future of Arab Military Effectiveness, Oxford University Press, 2018, ISBN 0-1909-0696-0
