= Middle East Policy =

- Discipline: Middle Eastern studies
- Language: English

Publication details
- History: 1982–present
- Publisher: Wiley-Blackwell
- Frequency: Quarterly

Standard abbreviations
- ISO 4: Middle East Policy

Indexing
- ISSN: 1475-4967
- OCLC no.: 49711379

Links
- Journal homepage

Middle East Policy is an academic peer-reviewed journal on the Middle East region in the field of foreign policy founded in 1982, published quarterly by Wiley-Blackwell on behalf of the Middle East Policy Council. Its current editor is Anne Joyce, vice president of the MEPC.

The journal was previously published by Blackwell Publishing before it was acquired by John Wiley & Sons.

== Contributors ==
Ann Elizabeth Mayer, Lenni Brenner, Sara Roy and W. Patrick Lang are notable contributors to the journal.

== See also ==
- Washington Report on Middle East Affairs
