= Attack! (board game) =

2003 war game published by Eagle Games

Attack! is a board game created by Glenn Drover and published by Eagle Games in 2003. It is a light war game that is midway between Risk and Axis and Allies in complexity. The game is loosely set in the 1930s and includes plastic pieces featuring tanks, planes, infantry, and artillery. Attack! won the Origins Award for Best Historical Game 2003.

== Overview ==
Like Risk, Attack! allows the players to create their own military states on a board showing a map of the Earth divided into territories and attack other players in an attempt to conquer the world, although the victory conditions for Attack! are a bit different from world domination. In the original game the victor is determined by how many territories each player has. When a player is knocked out by losing all of his or her territories or a pre-determined time limit is reached, each players' territories are then tallied and the player with the most is the victor. In the expansion to the board game, victory points are added. Whichever player has the most victory points by the end of the game wins. Victory points are tallied differently depending on what government type one has. The game is supposed to be set in the pre-World War II era.

Players start with 12 infantry, six tanks, four artillery, and two planes. They also start with one battleship, two destroyers, and two subs. Each player chooses 4 territories of their liking, and sets their capital on 1 of the four territories. Three attacks are possible each turn: a move, a Blitzkrieg move, an attack, a diplomacy, or spend on units. In one turn, player is able to do three actions. Each player does their turn in a circle, the person with the highest die roll going first.

Minor powers can be attacked by drawing an economic card, which shows the number of the minor nation's units, and are successfully annexed if the player defeats it. Nevertheless, the game also allows for peaceful annexation of minor nations.

=== Expansion ===
The Expansion added technology cards, trade route cards, and Production Points as well as the Eastern side of the world which can be added onto the western map board to make a gigantic map of the world Earth circa 1935. Production Points (P.P.) is the game currency that can be expended for units such as battleships and infantry. They are gained at the end of the round when economic cards' money value are totalled up. Technology cards are gained by a player if one successfully rolls a 10 or higher with the blue dice. Every time 5 P.P are expended, the dice roll number needed to win a technology card is subtracted by one. Technology cards give players certain advantages such as tanks that require three hits to destroy or planes get one extra die roll in battles. Another vital factor in the expansion is political cards, which are gained every time a successful diplomatic blitz or at the end of the round is conducted. Trade Route cards are auctioned cards starting at 20 Production Points, which every player attempts to gain by bidding higher. The highest bid wins. The trade route card is then placed on the sea zone listed in bold print on the card. Subs can attempt to torpedo the precious trade route card until it's gone. Two hits sink the trade route cards. This can be prevented by guarding trade routes with carriers and destroyers. Trade and movement can be halted altogether if one player controls the oceans.
