= Guns! Guns! Guns! =

Role-playing game supplement

Cover of 2nd edition (1989)

Guns! Guns! Guns! is a supplement published by Blacksburg Tactical Research Center in 1991 for use with any role-playing game system.

== Contents ==
Guns! Guns! Guns! provides step-by-step instructions on how to design virtual firearms for any roleplaying game system. Some of the parameters covered are damage value, projectile velocity, range limit, and barrel length. The book provides conversions of this data for eight different RPG systems, including GURPS and Torg.

== Publication history ==
Guns! Guns! Guns! (also known as 3G) was written by Greg Porter and published by Blacksburg Tactical Research Center in 1988. The following year, a 55-page 2nd edition was published. This was followed in 1991 by a much expanded 92-page 3rd edition.

The follow-up More Guns! was published in 1993, with additional rules and over 500 sample weapon designs for ten different game systems.

== Reception ==
In the April 1993 edition of Dragon (Issue #192), Rick Swan called this book "fascinating but demanding", pointing out that the book's approach "has more in common with physics texts than game books." Swan concluded with a qualified recommendation, saying this book "can be scary if you’re still using your fingers to keep track of hit points. But for the mathematically inclined, Guns, Guns, Guns is worth investigating."

== Other reviews ==
- Games Review, August 1989 (Vol. 1, Iss. 11, p. 26)
- Critical Miss, Summer 1999 (Issue 3)
- Casus Belli #106
- Abyss Quarterly #50 (Winter, 1992)
