= The Kids of Catan =

Board game

The Kids of Catan is a German board game designed for children using the theme from The Settlers of Catan. Like other Catan titles, the game is created by Klaus Teuber and published by Kosmos in German and Mayfair Games in English.

== Story ==
The story revolves around three children of Catan (despite the game being for four players) who are helping their parents build structures for Catan's first settlement. One parent is a brickmaker, one parent is a woodcutter, and one parent is a farmer. To help their parents, the children, with the help of their wagons, help the parents haul goods. However, the children are bullied by one of the kids' older siblings, who sometimes scare them into running away from their wagons and finding their goods stolen when they return.

== Gameplay ==
The game is played on a turntable separated into 16 sections. Each of the four players and their wagons are placed on the turntable itself, while the 16 spaces are on the outside. 15 of these spaces allow the players to collect resources - five each in three different types, while the 16th space is the robber. Players begin the game so that no one begins in the robber's space.

On a player's turn, a die is rolled and the turntable is advanced a certain number of spaces. Each player, if on a resource space with a resource present, collects the particular resource there if they do not already have the resource in their wagon. If a player lands on the robber, they are forced to give up a resource on their wagon and return it to a space on the board. If, after collecting resources, a player's wagon is full, they may place a building on the board, and returns their three resources to spaces on the board. There are a total of 13 buildings - 12 red ones and the green city hall. The red buildings are divided evenly amongst the players, and the city hall may only be built by players who have placed all of their red buildings.

The winner is the player who builds the city hall.
