= TimeLords (role-playing game) =

Tabletop role-playing game

Adventure Into Forever
- TimeLords 2nd edition cover
- Designers: Greg Porter
- Publishers: Blacksburg Tactical Research Center (BTRC)
- Publication: 1987 1st edition; 1990 2nd Edition; 2003 EABA TimeLords; 2003 CORPS TimeLords; 2013 EABA v2 TimeLords
- Genres: time travel, science fiction
- Systems: Custom d20(1st–2nd edition); CORPS; EABA

TimeLords is a set of time travel role-playing games by Greg Porter and published by Blacksburg Tactical Research Center (BTRC). The first two editions used a custom d20-based game system; the most recent edition uses the EABA system from BTRC.

== History ==
TimeLords was developed by Greg Porter while attending college at Virginia Tech in the early 1980s, and many of his fellow Wargaming Society members are immortalized in the first edition as sample characters. He approached many game companies with the idea for a time travel-based role-playing game, but all preferred a supplement for their own systems rather than a stand-alone RPG. Fantasy Games Unlimited agreed to publish the game, but sat on it for several years and never did.

Porter started Blacksburg Tactical Research Center in 1985, and TimeLords was its first RPG product. It did not initially sell well, but maintained a cult following that allowed a second edition to be published in 1990. Several books of adventures were published in the early 1990s for use with the second edition.

In 2003, TimeLords was redone as a setting for BTRC's EABA universal role-playing game system. BTRC stopped paper publication of all of its games, and made them available only in a downloaded PDF format, or printed on-demand.

== Setting ==
TimeLords begins at the End of Time. In the far future, a race known as "The Designers", gifted in both psionics and sciences, set about escaping their fate as the inevitable end of the universe encroached. Eventually, they discover time travel, and use this knowledge to move their entire solar system backwards in time to when the universe is about 15 billion years old. The actual Designers have never been seen by humans. The pinnacle of their achievements was the "Matrix", a small time-travel device, the size and shape of a 20-sided die, weighing about 1 pound. A Matrix could be used for personal time travel, as an energy source, and other things only hinted at by the rule books. When activated, a Matrix generates a spherical force field 6 meters in diameter, and instantly transports everything inside it to the new time and location. It is one of these Matrix devices that the players of the game find to begin their adventure.

TimeLords may be played two possible ways:

- The Primary Game, where players play as characters based on themselves, lost in time after finding a Matrix device.
- The Secondary Game, in which players make characters who are agents of a Time Patrol organization.

Characters may find themselves at any time in Earth history, past or future. Space travel is also a possibility, with some modules taking place on spaceships or other planets. The game also hints at the idea of traveling to alternate universes, where mental powers, magic, or alternate technologies exist, opening up the possibility for fantasy, steampunk, post-apocalyptic, or any other game setting the players may want.

The game explains time and time travel through a branching multiple timeline system. Traveling to the past does not change the timeline you came from, it creates a new one with you in it. This makes it impossible for someone to go back in time and kill their own grandfather (the Grandfather Paradox), as this would only create a new timeline where the grandfather was dead; the old timeline where he was alive would still exist also. This also makes it incredibly difficult for characters “lost” in time to find the original timeline they came from, as every jump creates more and more timelines, and pushes them farther from the original.

== System ==
The first two editions of TimeLords used a custom d20-based system designed by Greg Porter. The emphasis is on realism over speed and playability.

=== Attributes ===
Regardless of which subgame of TimeLords played, characters have from 10-11 Primary Attributes:

- Strength
- Constitution
- Intelligence
- Dexterity
- Willpower
- Bravado
- Appearance
- Perception
- Stamina
- Power: used for mental powers (optional)
- Matrix Lag: number of seconds of stun and inability to act after using the Matrix for a "jump". This attribute can be lowered, but never to less than 1.

Attributes are scored between 1-20, with 8-11 considered an average human score. Each 3 points roughly doubles an attribute, so a character with a strength of 13 could lift double that of one with a strength of 10. Scores under 5 are considered feeble, while scores of 15 or higher are considered the upper levels of human ability.

==== Primary Game: Generating Yourself ====
To assist players in generating a character based on themselves, the game suggests a number of tests for the players to conduct.

- Strength is tested by holding progressively heavier weights at arm's length for a full 5 seconds.
- Constitution is based on how frequently the player gets sick, and how quickly they recover from injury or illness.
- Intelligence is based on IQ score, SAT or ACT score, or QCA score for full time students.
- Dexterity uses physical tests such as juggling and balance.
- Bravado and Appearance are discussed and voted on by other players. Someone judged to have a "good poker face" or the ability to talk their way out of speeding tickets would have a higher Bravado.
- Matrix Lag is based on a d20 roll. It gradually lowers over the course of the game as the character gets used to using a matrix.
- Power is based on a d20 roll only. It is meant to reflect a player's mental ability for psionics, magic, or telepathic powers, and is rarely used. Some alternate universes might have these abilities.

=== Skills ===
Skills rate each character's relative ability to do things, such as fire a gun or drive a car. Each skill is related to an attribute, for example "firearms" is based on Dexterity, and "computer" based on Intelligence. A high attribute score would gain the character a bonus in a related skill, and makes learning a new skill easier.

To determine the success or failure of an action, the character's skill level is modified by any factors that would make the action more or less difficult, then this is run through the Universal Modifier Chart. A simple d20 roll is then made to determine success.

In the Primary Game, players go through an extensive list of possible skills with the game master, and rate themselves and each other on a 1-20 scale. A beginner might have a range of 2-5, while a skill used professionally might rate 16 or higher. The game also encourages the creation of new skills, to cover relevant experience players may have that is not included in the manual.

In the Secondary Game, characters purchase skills in a points based system.

=== The Universal Modifier Chart ===
This chart is the games system for overcoming one of the perceived flaws in a linearly progressive skill based game system. In a standard system, any modifier to a die roll has a greater effect on a lower skill level than a higher one. For example, a -1 modifier to a skill of 15 reduces that skill by about 7%, where a skill of 5 is reduced by 20%. To overcome this, any roll to determine the success of an action would first have the modifiers referenced on the Universal Modifier Chart, which would alter the penalty (or bonus) to the skill accordingly.

For skills in the median range, 8-12, the UMC does not make much difference in rolls needed. Use of the chart is considered optional, as it slows down play in an already complex system.

=== Combat ===
The first two editions used one of the most complex combat systems of any RPG, with a goal of simulating real life as closely as possible. To shoot a firearm, for example, a character's "firearm" skill is modified by the accuracy of the weapon, the distance to the target, size of the target, and other conditions such as weather or terrain. These modifiers are run through the UMC, and a roll made to determine if the attack scored a hit.

To determine damage from an attack, the body is divided into 26 areas, each with its own damage points, and separate tables for determining damage to each area. Damage is further divided based on the type of weapon used, and the type of damage it could cause (blunt, crushing, burning, edged, etc.); then modified based on armor worn, again divided based on how the armor countered different damage types. Still more tables are used to find continuing damage from bleeding, recovery times, unconsciousness, temporary and permanent disabilities, or possibly death.

This resulted in nearly half of the book being devoted to combat tables, and correspondingly long and complex combat. A simple one on one confrontation might take an hour or more. A simplified version of the combat rules, using only 6 body areas, and correspondingly fewer tables, is also given, and does cut down on some of the complexity.

The goal, as stated by the game's designer, was to create as realistic a combat system as possible, and avoid the "shot in the foot" paradox of some other game systems. This happens in some games when a character low on hit points could be killed by shooting them in the foot, something that would almost never happen in real life. Characters in TimeLords rarely die from a single attack, instead they suffer traumas that might lead to death if left untreated.

=== Advancement ===
To keep the game more focused on realism, characters do not gain experience points or levels like many RPGs. A character's attributes or skills may increase based on how often and how well they were used during the game. Practicing a skill or actively working on an ability can also cause it to increase. For example, spending a few hours a day at a firing range may increase the "firearms" skill, but not as quickly as using that skill in combat situations. Skill advancement also requires that characters push the boundaries of their skill - driving a car in normal traffic every day for 10 years does not automatically make someone an expert driver, as they would never learn advanced techniques that racing drivers would learn.

== TimeLords 3rd Edition ==
The cover to TimeLords 3rd Edition, which uses the EABA rules

=== EABA TimeLords ===
In 2003, BTRC re-issued TimeLords as a setting for their new EABA (End All Be All) generic role-playing game system. All books are available in PDF format only, through download or print on demand.

In 2013, TimeLords was re-released as a setting for the EABA v2 system, also in PDF format only.

Some changes made to the setting with the EABA rules:

- A Matrix can only be used by a Designer, or a descendant of a Designer. This means that one of the characters must have some ancient Designer relative. Which character this is can be left unknown to the players.
- A Matrix no longer requires direct contact to function. This makes it easier for the Game Master to disguise which player may have Designer blood.

=== CORPS TimeLords ===
The TimeLords game was released as a setting for the generic RPG CORPS (Complete Omniversal Role Playing System) Second Edition rules in 1995, also by BTRC. It is a d10 based system, but otherwise the same as EABA TimeLords, and out of print since 1999.

== Reception ==
Rick Swan reviewed TimeLords three times:

- In Issue 83 of Space Gamer/Fantasy Gamer, Swan commented that "The game mechanics [...] contain so many innovative ideas, that Timelords is worth a look by anyone interested in alternative approaches to roleplaying.". Swan
- In his 1990 book The Complete Guide to Role-Playing Games, Swan called this "a detailed, intelligent treatment of time travel." Although Swan found the combat system too complicated, he gave this game a solid rating of 3 out of 4, saying, "Timelords contains so many interesting ideas that it is easily the best-ever time travel RPG.
- In Dragon Magazine he reviewed the second edition of TimeLords in issue 191, describing the combat system as highly realistic but "bordering on the incomprehensible", and "almost obsessive about minutia", but noted that players in this type of game setting would normally want to avoid combat. He also praised the game's explanation of timelines and time travel, calling it "elegant and fascinating".

== Publications ==
First edition

- TimeLords TL-01, by Greg Porter (1987) ASIN B000JQ7FH6
- Pursuit: An Adventure Module for TimeLords, by Greg Porter and Jasper Merendino (1988) ASIN B000J0TLTC
- Adventure Pack #1, Three introductory adventures for TimeLords, by Greg Porter and Roger Campbell (1988)
- Avengers, A campaign supplement for TimeLords, by Greg Porter (1988)

Second edition

- TimeLords (2nd Edition), by Greg Porter (1990) ISBN 0-943891-10-8
- Time Capsules, by Greg Porter (1990) ISBN 0-943891-11-6, book of mini adventures
- Supertanker of Death, by Erik Baker (1991) ISBN 0-943891-18-3, full length adventure
- Time Capsules 2: Adventures for TimeLords, by Greg Porter (1993) ISBN 0-943891-22-1, 60 pages of mini adventures
- BTRC Adventure Pack #1, Three introductory adventures for TimeLords, by Greg Porter and Roger Campbell (1995) ISBN 0-943891-01-9
- Avengers, A campaign supplement for TimeLords, by Greg Porter (1995), ISBN 0-943891-02-7

EABA and CORPS editions are only available in a downloaded PDF format.

== See also ==
- WarpWorld: a post-apocalyptic RPG from BTRC, using the same d20-based system.
- SpaceTime: a cyberpunk RPG from BTRC, using the same d20-based system.
