= CORPS =

Tabletop role-playing game

- Cover of the 2nd edition CORPS core rule book
- Designers: Greg Porter
- Publishers: Blacksburg Tactical Research Center
- Publication: 1990 1st edition; 1995 Generic RPG; 2005 Applied Vectors Edition; 2016 CORPS v3.0
- Genres: generic RPG

The CORPS game system, created by Greg Porter was in its first 1990 edition the Conspiracy Oriented Roleplaying System, which was later revised and re-named the Complete Omniversal Role Playing System to focus purely on being a generic role-playing game system.

== History ==
=== First Edition ===
The original game, created by Greg Porter in 1990, was titled the Conspiracy Oriented Role Playing System, a techno-thriller about conspiracies using magic and super-science to compete against each other in the modern world.

Supplements for the original system:

- CORPS: The Conspiracy Role-Playing Game ISBN 0-943891-14-0
- CORPS Vehicle Design System ISBN 0-943891-35-3
- CORPS Technology 1991 ISBN 0-943891-15-9
- CORPS Deathwind ISBN 0-943891-17-5
- CORPS Organization Book ISBN 0-943891-20-5
- CORPS Worldbook 1992 ISBN 0-943891-21-3
- CORPS Gamemaster Screen ISBN 0-943891-23-X

=== Second Edition ===
In 1995, the system was rewritten as a generic role-playing game system, and renamed Complete Omniversal Role Playing System. The original conspiracy game was kept as one of many possible settings, while the basic game system was streamlined but kept largely intact. Blacksburg Tactical Research Center ceased creating further materials for the system in 2003. Existing CORPS works are still available as PDFs and via print on demand, while the original conspiracy game was converted to a setting for BTRC's EABA generic RPG system.

Supplements released for this edition included Down in Flames (1999).

=== Applied Vectors Editions ===
In August 2008, the game company Applied Vectors entered into a new contract to create the CORPS Rules Expansion, which included a host of add-ons for the original game, including a bestiary and reprinted material from the first edition game. This was made available in April 2009.

In September 2011, Applied Vectors announced a license agreement with BTRC to produce the 3rd edition of the CORPS roleplaying game. This was intended to be a complete overhaul of the system, but as of March 31, 2018 no product other than the CORPS Rules Expansion has appeared and the company seems to be concentrating its efforts on other game systems.

=== CORPS v3.0 ===
In 2016, BTRC re-released the original conspiracy game as a setting for its EABAv2 generic game system.

== System ==
CORPS uses a custom d10 based system for most actions.

=== Characters ===
A character in CORPS is built based on two types of statistic based on Attributes and Skills. These are purchased in a points based system, using Attribute Points (AP) to purchase attributes, and Skill Points (SP) to purchase skills. The total number of points available to spend depends on the setting and Game Master. A "normal" human might start with 100AP and 50SP, while a superhero character might start with 200AP and SP (or more).

=== Attributes ===
Attributes are ranked on a 1-10 scale, with an average human rating a 4-5 in any one attribute and 10 being human maximum. CORPS uses six basic Attributes: Strength, Agility, Awareness, Willpower, Health and Power.

The cost of an Attribute is the square of the Attribute rank purchased, so a Strength of 4 would cost 16AP, and an Agility of 5 would cost 25AP.

=== Skills ===
Skills are linked to attribute scores via aptitudes (attribute/4) and applied to a specific area. Certain skill level requires Skill Points equal to square of the desired skill level minus the square of the related aptitude. Hence character with a high attribute would have to spend less Skill Points to develop skills related to that attribute.

Skills are further broken down into Primary, Secondary and Tertiary skills. These break down specializations of specific skills. Secondary skills have a maximum level of one-half of the associated Primary skill, and Tertiary skills have a maximum level of one-half of the associated Secondary skill. The aptitude savings apply only to primary skills.

For example, the character with the Firearms skill of 4 may decide to also purchase the associated Secondary skill of Longarms with a maximum of 2, and the Tertiary skill of M-16A2 with a maximum of 1. This character could then use an M-16A2 rifle with a total skill of 7.

=== Ads and disads ===
Players can also use the points for additional advantages or gain more points by accepting disadvantages. These are very generic like Age, Authority/Duty, Natural Aptitude/Debility, Physical Advantage/Limitation, Psychological Limitation and Wealth (positive or negative). The system also gives some points for writing a character background and drawing a character portrait.

=== Success Rolls ===
To keep the system simple and fast moving, success rolls are not needed for many actions. Any action a character may attempt is rated based on difficulty. If the character's appropriate skill level is equal to or higher than the difficulty, the action succeeds automatically. If it is lower, the player may roll 1d10. If they roll less than 11 minus the difference between their skill and the difficulty of the action times 2, they succeed.

For example, the character above with a total skill of 7 attempts an action with a difficulty of 8. It is higher than his skill, so it's not automatic. The difference is only 1, so he needs to roll a 9 or less. (11 - (2x1) = 9). If the action had a difficulty of 9, he would need to roll a 7 or less.

While it may seem confusing at first, this system makes success rolls very quick and predictable. The only rolls ever needed are 9, 7, 5, 3, or 1. Any action with a difficulty more than 5 points higher than a character's skill is therefore impossible unless the campaign uses the "long shot" rule; if the player rolls 1, they may roll again with a -5 difficulty.

=== Advancement ===
Characters advance by increasing their skills and attributes. During play, characters earn additional Attribute and Skills Points related to the attributes and skills they used in play. The cost to increase a skill or attribute is the difference between the cost of the level they currently have, and the cost of the level they want. Therefore, to improve a Strength score from 5 to 6 would cost 11 points (6² - 5² = '11, omitting aptitude savings).

== CORPS Related Settings ==
- TimeLords, a CORPS version of the original game setting
- Dreamtime, a mythical stone-age setting
- Apocalypse, a dark alternate history setting written by Charles Rice under the pseudonym Ed Rice. ISBN 0-943891-36-1

== Related Games ==
Precis Intermedia published a diceless adaptation of the original CORPS setting, for use with their Active Exploits system, in 2005

== Reception ==
Jim Foster reviewed CORPS in White Wolf #27 (June/July, 1991), rating it a 4 out of 5 and stated that "overall, I rather enjoyed Corps, and look forward to more products in this line from BTRC. The game does a respectable job of capturing the paranoia of a conspiracy game, and provides the gamer with some extremely simple and acceptably realistic systems to play out these fears. And you certainly can't beat the price."
