= The Testimony of Jacob Hollow =

The Testimony of Jacob Hollow is a 2003 board game published by Third World Games.

== Gameplay ==
The Testimony of Jacob Hollow is a game in which players explore the town of Castle Bay, surviving gruesome encounters and gathering clues in a race to reach 10 Investigation Points—or simply outlive everyone else.

== Reviews ==
- Pyramid
- Rue Morgue #36
