= Pity the Nation: Lebanon at War =

Nonfiction book by Robert Fisk

- Author: Robert Fisk
- Language: English
- Genre: History, Current Affairs
- Publisher: Oxford University Press
- Publication date: 1990
- Publication place: Great Britain
- Media type: Print (Hardback & Paperback) & Kindle
- Pages: 681
- ISBN: 978-0-19-285235-9

Pity the Nation: Lebanon at War is a nonfiction book by the English journalist Robert Fisk. The book is an account of the Lebanese civil war 1975–1990 which Fisk lived through and reported on. It gives an insight into the machinations of the war and has many eyewitness accounts from the people Fisk interviewed and interacted with at the time. The book also deals with the history of the foundation of Lebanon and its colonial past.

It goes into detail of the 1982 Lebanon war which was an invasion by the Israeli military and also the Sabra and Shatila massacre which Fisk was present at the day after it happened. The book covers the American, British, French and Italian intervention as Multinational Force in Lebanon and the evacuation of the PLO.

The book's title is taken from Khalil Gibran's famous poem of the same name, which was published posthumously in The Garden of the Prophet in 1933.
