= Strange Synergy =

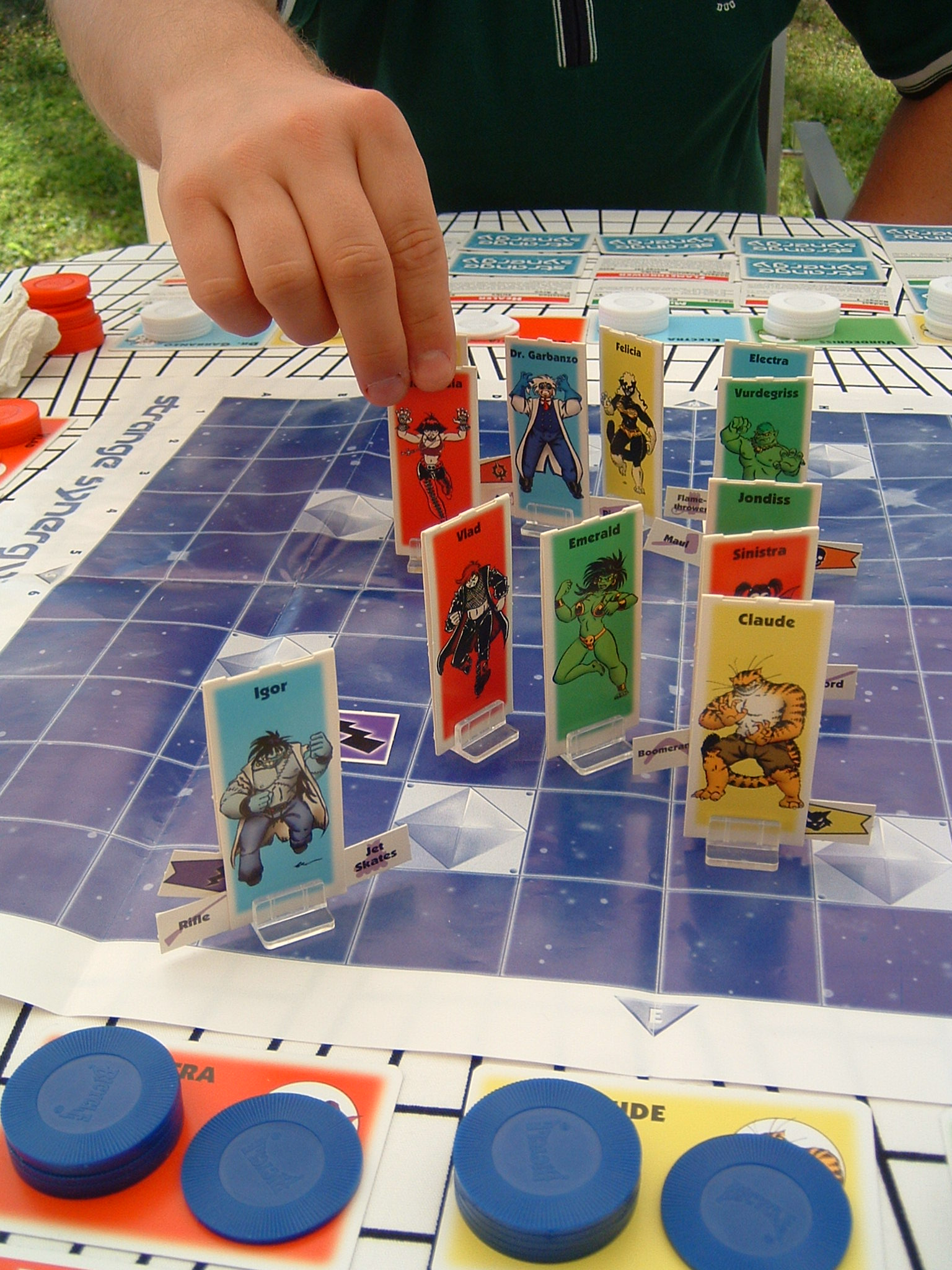
A game of Strange Synergy underway

Strange Synergy is a card game published by Steve Jackson Games in which players build a team of super heroes to battle an opponent's team.

The game supports up to four players. However, there are bases and flags for two more players. Each player receives a team of three "Super Heroes" cards that all share a base special power (such as accelerated movement or higher damage). Each player then receives nine power cards which they will distribute evenly amongst their team. There are three main ways to win the game: kill all opposing team members, stun/freeze (neutralize) all enemies for three turns in a row, or capture an opposing team's flag.
