= Vanished Planet =

- Designers: Samuel Blanchard
- Players: 1-6
- Setup time: 5 minutes
- Playing time: 30 minutes per player
- Chance: Goal and Event cards
- Age range: 10+
- Website: Official Vanished Planet webpage at the Wayback Machine (archived 3 March 2014)

Vanished Planet is a cooperative board game that debuted at the World Boardgaming Championships in 2003. Vanished Planet pits the players against a time limit; the players must succeed in a certain number of goals before this time limit is reached, or they all lose.

== Game Play ==
In the game scenario, Earth has been replaced by a dark mass (the creature) that is growing outward toward the six planets of the remaining galactic species. Cryptic transmissions from Earth can be obtained from satellites or from communication relays that players can construct during the course of the game; these transmissions are goals that specify actions to take, such as discarding equipment or people, or visiting certain places on the board. Through game play, players can build new spaceships, upgrade their spaceships, or build mines that slow the process of the creature. They do this by visiting places on the board that can be tagged to produce various resources that can be used to hire personnel and build technology and equipment. Each turn, a random event drawn from a deck of event cards can either benefit or hinder the player whose turn it is. Creature growth cards can be added to the event deck to alter the difficulty of the game.

== History ==
In 2005, the Racial Advantage Expansion was added to the game. This expansion introduces a new race and adds two special abilities to each race. Depending on the special ability chosen, the players may need to complete more goals in order to win the game.

== Awards ==
Vanished Planet was named by Games magazine as "best family game" in 2005.

== Reviews ==
- Pyramid
