= More Guns! =

Role-playing game supplement

More Guns! is a 1993 role-playing supplement published by Blacksburg Tactical Research Center.

== Contents ==
More Guns! is a supplement in which hundreds of weapons are listed for use with several gaming systems.

== Reception ==
Jim Foster reviewed More Guns! in White Wolf #45 (July, 1994), rating it a 4 out of 5 and stated that "This book is a must have for 3G^{3} users, especially those looking for a little help with the system. It also proves rewarding to those who game across many different tech levels or histories or even to those looking to put something new into a more localized campaign. Of the many 'gun books' that have been published, More Guns! is one of the best."

== Reviews ==
- Dragon #207
