= Sara Roy =

American political economist and scholar

Sara M. Roy (born 1955) is an American political economist and scholar. She is a research associate at the Center for Middle Eastern Studies at Harvard University.

Roy's research and publications focus on the economy of Gaza and Hamas. Reviewing her 2007 Failing Peace: Gaza and the Palestinian-Israeli Conflict, Bruce Lawrence writes that "Roy is the leading researcher and most widely respected academic authority on Gaza today," and she considers the Gaza Strip her second home. She has also studied Palestinian politics and the broader Israeli–Palestinian conflict.

== Biography ==
Roy was born and raised in West Hartford, where she attended Hall High School. She received her undergraduate degree from Harvard College. She currently resides in Boston, Massachusetts.

She is the daughter of Jewish parents who survived the Holocaust. In a lecture she stated that "the Holocaust has been the defining feature of my life" as part of the Second Annual Holocaust Remembrance Lecture, which she delivered at the George W. Truett Theological Seminary at Baylor University. Roy had been invited by Center for American and Jewish Studies founding director Marc H. Ellis to connect her family's experience in the Holocaust to her academic work on the Palestinian people. Roy explained that both her parents had survived the Holocaust, but that 100 members of her extended family, who had resided in the Jewish shtetls of Poland, had been killed. Her father, Abraham Rój, was one of the seven known survivors of the Chelmno extermination camp, while her mother, Taube, survived Halbstadt (Gross Rosen) and Auschwitz. In an article in CounterPunch, Roy wrote that while her mother was confined in the Łódź Ghetto she endeavoured to hide children destined for deportation to the Nazi extermination camps, but they were seized and despatched to Auschwitz.

Roy earned an Ed.D. with a specialization in International Development from Harvard University's Graduate School of Education in 1988.

Having visited Israel many times when she was growing up, she added, "[i]t was perhaps inevitable that I would follow a path that would lead me to the Arab-Israeli issue", providing several examples of parallels between Nazi treatment of Jews "in the 1930s, before the ghettos and death camps", and Israeli soldiers' treatment of Palestinians which, in her opinion, "were absolutely equivalent in principle, intent, and impact: to humiliate and dehumanize."

She further developed these themes in the 2008 Edward Said Memorial Lecture at the University of Adelaide, in which she said:

"Israel's occupation of the Palestinians is not the moral equivalent of the Nazi genocide of the Jews. It does not have to be. The fact that it is not in no way tempers the brutality of the repression, which has become frighteningly normal. Occupation is about the domination and dispossession of one people by another. It is about the destruction of their property and the destruction of their soul. At its core, occupation aims to deny Palestinians their humanity by denying them the right to determine their existence, to live normal lives in their own homes. And just as there is no moral equivalence or symmetry between the Holocaust and the occupation, so there is no moral equivalence or symmetry between the occupier and the occupied, no matter how much we as Jews regard ourselves as victims."

== Career ==
Roy spent time doing dissertation fieldwork in Israel and in the Gaza Strip as a research assistant to the third West Bank Data Base Project. She was part of a non-official survey led by Meron Benvenisti, whose goal was to examine the impact of Israel's national unity coalition government on the West Bank and to a lesser extent the Gaza Strip. Roy prepared a background paper about the Gaza Strip for the Project in 1986, before submitting, in 1988, her doctoral thesis entitled Development under occupation: a study of United States government economic development assistance to the Palestinian people in the West Bank and Gaza Strip, 1975-1985.

Roy is also the author of The Gaza Strip Survey (1986) and The Gaza Strip: The Political Economy of De‐development (1995, 2001, 2016). She is the editor of The Economics of Middle East Peace: A Reassessment (1999). Her 2011 study of Hamas, political Islam and the Islamic social sector in Gaza won a 2012 British-Kuwait Friendship Society Prize in Middle Eastern Studies.

Roy's work has appeared in the Journal of Palestine Studies, Current History, Middle East Journal, Middle East Policy, International Journal of Middle East Studies, American Political Science Review, Critique, Chicago Journal of International Law, Index on Censorship, La Vanguardia, Le Monde Diplomatique, the London Review of Books, and The Lancet. In March 2012 she authored "Gaza: Treading on Shards" in The Nation.

Roy has served on the advisory boards of American Near East Refugee Aid and the Center for American and Jewish Studies at Baylor University and on the Board of Directors of the Gaza Community Mental Health Program - U.S. branch.

In addition to her academic work, Roy has served as a consultant to international organizations, the U.S. government, human rights organizations, private voluntary organizations, and private business groups working in the Middle East.

Roy features in New Zealand filmmaker Sarah Cordery's 2016 documentary feature film Notes to Eternity, in which she addresses her Jewish heritage and long-standing work on the Israel-Palestine conflict. Notes to Eternity screened at the Belfast Film Festival in 2017. She was elected a 2024–2025 Cullman Center Fellow at the New York Public Library.

== Claim of censorship ==
Roy drew public attention when a book review she had written of Mathew Levitt's book Hamas: Politics, Charity, and Terrorism in the Service of Jihad was rejected by Tufts University’s The Fletcher Forum of World Affairs. After the editor-in-chief accepted the piece, he wrote to inform Roy that the article had been reviewed for "objectivity," and that "all reviewers found the piece one-sided" and then rejected it, but apologized "for the way in which this process was carried out." Middle East Policy later published the review with Roy's note on the affair which described the rejection as a "blatant . . . case of censorship."

== Publications ==
=== Books ===
- Unsilencing Gaza. New York: Pluto Press. 2021. ISBN 978-0-745-341361.
- Hamas and Civil Society in Gaza: Engaging the Islamist Social Sector. Princeton: University Press. 2011. ISBN 978-0-691-12448-3.
- Failing Peace: Gaza and the Palestinian-Israeli Conflict. London: Pluto Press. 2006. ISBN 978-0-7453-2235-3.
- Research in Middle East Economics, Volume 3. The Economics of Middle East Peace: A Reassessment. JAI Press. 1999. ISBN 978-0-7623-0410-3.
- The Gaza Strip: The Political Economy of De-development. Beirut: Institute for Palestine Studies. 1995. ISBN 978-0-88728-260-7.
- The Gaza Strip: A Demographic, Economic, Social and Legal Survey. Westview Press. 1986. ISBN 978-0-8133-0474-8.

=== Articles ===
- Roy, Sara (2005). "Praying with Their Eyes Closed: Reflections on the Disengagement from Gaza". Journal of Palestine Studies. 34 (4): 64. doi:10.1525/jps.2005.34.4.64. Archived from the original on June 6, 2012.
- Roy, Sara (1987). "The Gaza Strip: A Case of Economic De-Development" (PDF). Journal of Palestine Studies. 17 (1): 56–88. doi:10.1525/jps.1987.17.1.00p0144f. Archived from the original (PDF) on May 13, 2013.
