= Don't Quote Me =

Board game franchise

Don't Quote Me is a brand developed by Wiggles 3D. The company is a games and entertainment publisher. The company has developed a line of Don't Quote Me board games and also has an online quotations database.

== Board games ==
The original Don't Quote Me game features quotes from historical figures and current celebrities. It won GAMES Magazine's GAMES 100 award in 2004. Other versions of the game include a TV edition, a children's edition and a sports edition.

A public Facebook app lets users play the original Don't Quote Me game online.

== Puzzles ==
Don't Quote Me has a series of syndicated newspaper puzzles. The puzzles all feature quotations. Don't Quote Me has a series of syndicated newspaper puzzles that appear daily in print and online in USA Today.

A different type of quote puzzle, called a QuoteSlide, appears daily on Shockwave.com and Games.com.

== Books ==
In 2008, the editors at Don't Quote Me produced a quotations book. Called Beltway Bloopers: Hilarious Quotes and Anecdotes from Washington, D.C., it was published by Metro Books. The book is a collection of political quotations.
