= Greg Porter (game designer) =

Role-playing game designer

- Occupation: Game designer

Greg Porter is an American game designer who has worked primarily on role-playing games.

== Career ==
Greg Porter ran Blacksburg Tactical Research Center as one of a few game companies active in Blacksburg, Virginia in the 1980s and 1990s. Porter initially came to attention for designing TimeLords and Macho Women with Guns RPGs in the late 1980s; he then put his energy into two successive generic RPG systems, CORPS and EABA.

Porter subsequently wrote articles for Hogshead Publishing's Inter*action magazine. He also did work for Imperium Games, including contributing equipment and vehicles for the fourth edition of Traveller. Porter got more involved in the indie role-playing game movement after he met Ron Edwards and other members of The Forge in 2002.
