= Blacksburg Tactical Research Center =

Blacksburg Tactical Research Center, Inc.
- Type: Private
- Industry: Role-playing game publisher
- Founded: Blacksburg, Virginia (1985)
- Headquarters: Blacksburg, Virginia, United States
- Key people: Greg Porter
- Products: EABA, CORPS, TimeLords, Macho Women with Guns, Infinite Armies

Blacksburg Tactical Research Center (BTRC) is an American game publishing company best known for the TimeLords, Macho Women with Guns, and EABA role-playing games. They have produced a variety of role-playing games, card games, and board games. Since 2003, they have published exclusively in PDF.

== History ==
While a student at Virginia Tech in the early 1980s, Greg Porter designed several role playing and board games as part of the school's wargaming club. He approached numerous game companies about publishing his designs, but after multiple rejections decided to start his own company. He founded BTRC in 1985, in Blacksburg, Virginia. Greg decided early on that he did not want the company to take on large amounts of debt to release or promote products, so the first games saw very limited releases. Its first product was a board game, Concrete Jungle, a modern tactical game of small-unit military and police actions. TimeLords was its first role-playing game product, released in 1987. It did not initially sell well, but maintained a cult following that allowed a second edition to be published in 1990, followed by a number of supplements. The 1988 release of Macho Women with Guns saw unexpected success and several printings, and allowed the company to continue and expand its line of role-playing game products.

In the 90s, the company shifted its focus to generic role playing game systems, first with CORPS, followed by their flagship system EABA in 2003. With the creation of EABA, they moved to release games exclusively in PDF format, either through online download or print on demand. This allowed BTRC to produce more games and continually update them without reprinting new versions every time, but also limited their reach into game stores and slowed sales. The move to PDF only also allows their games to use many of the built in features of the PDF format across any platform, such as automated dice rolling, live links, and mapping. BTRC's work has been called "the bleeding edge of PDF game development",

== Published games ==
=== Role Playing Games ===
- TimeLords, 1987
- SpaceTime, 1988
- Macho Women with Guns, 1988
- CORPS, 1990
- Warp World, 1991
- Epiphany: The Legends of Hyperborea, 1996. Experimental diceless open-sourced system and setting.
- EABA, generic roleplaying system, 2003
- Hollyworld, 2005
- Purgatory Bay, 2011
- EABA v2, 2012
- Epiphany 2e, 2021. Reworking of the original Epiphany system, no longer diceless.

=== Game Supplements ===
- Guns! Guns! Guns!, 1991. Firearms design rules for any role-playing game.
- More Guns!, 1993. Follow up to the Guns! Guns! Guns! supplement, with additional rules and over 500 sample weapons for 10 different game systems.
- Stuff!, 2006. EABA-based item design tool for any role-playing game. Nominated for the 2006 Ennie award,

=== Board Games ===
- Concrete Jungle, 1985
- The Con Game, 1989
- Black Death, 1993
- Slag!: Combat on the High Frontier, 1995
- End of Days, 2008
- Soft Landing, 2009
- Hunted, 2017
- Black Death 2.0, 2021

=== Card Games ===
- F*CK This!, rude and crude card game, 2004
- Dumbass!, less rude card game, 2006
- Infinite Armies, 2005, winner of 2006 Origins Vanguard award
- Footsteps of the Prophet, 2008
- Alien Zombie Tentacle Apocalypse, 2010
- Donner Party, 2016
- Killing Lee Garvin, 2019
- Badass Zombie Killers, 2020
- Artistes Miserables, 2022

=== Experimental Games ===
- Posturing and Pretentions, 2002. Satirical roleplaying game
- EBON, 2006. A complete role-playing game that fits on a single sheet of paper.
- Tag!, 2020. Intended for game conventions, each player's convention name tag is their game piece.
