= List of Cyberpunk 2020 books =

This is a list of Cyberpunk role-playing game books.

== CyberPunk 2013 ==
=== R. Talsorian Games ===
The core books for the game were published by R. Talsorian Games.

- Cyberpunk, by Mike Pondsmith (boxed set) (1988) [CP3001] - Includes View from the Edge (core rules booklet), Friday Night Firefight (combat rules booklet), and Welcome to Night City (gameworld sourcebook booklet)
- Hardwired, by Walter Jon Williams (1989) [CP3201] - Sourcebook about the novel Hardwired by Walter Jon Williams.
- Near Orbit: Space Supplement for Cyberpunk, by Mike Pondsmith, David Ackerman, Glenn Wildermuth, and Derek Quintanar (1989) [CP3301] - High Orbit sourcebook and space travel rules.
- Rockerboy, by Colin Fisk, Will Moss, Scott Ruggels, and David Ackerman (1989) [CP3401] - Rockerboy character class sourcebook.
- Solo of Fortune (Journal of the Corporate Mercenary) (1989) [CP3101] - Solo character class sourcebook.

== CyberPunk 2020 ==
=== R. Talsorian Games ===
==== Corebooks ====
- Cyberpunk 2020, by Mike Pondsmith, Colin Fisk, Will Moss, and Scott Ruggels. (boxed set) (1990) [CP3002] - Includes Cyberpunk 2020 version 2.0 core rules and Screamsheets booklet.
- Cyberpunk 2020 version 2.00, Mike Pondsmith, Colin Fisk, Will Moss, Scott Ruggels, Dave Friedland, Mike Blum (1991) [CP3002]
- Cyberpunk 2020 version 2.01 ("Features New Artwork" written on front cover), Mike Pondsmith, Colin Fisk, Will Moss, Scott Ruggels, Dave Friedland, Mike Blum (1993) [CP3002]
- Cyberpunk 2020 version 2.01 ("Features New Artwork" removed from front cover. White lines removed from Cyberpunk logo. Text changed to "The Classic Roleplaying Game of the Dark Future"), Mike Pondsmith, Colin Fisk, Will Moss, Scott Ruggels, Dave Friedland, Mike Blum (2014) [CP3002.2] - Released in 2014 after the release of the Cyberpunk 2077 video game.
- Deep Space: The Interplanetary Supplement, by Chris Young and Scott Hedrick (1993) [CP3211]
- Listen Up, You Primitive Screwheads!!!!: The Unexpurgated Cyberpunk Referee's Guide, by Mike Pondsmith (1994) [CP3291] - Referee's Guide.

==== Sourcebooks ====
- Blackhand's Street Weapons 2020, by Derek Quintanar (1994) [CP3461]
- Chromebook, by Colin Fisk (1991) [CP3701]
- Chromebook 2, by Benjamin Wright, Mike Roter, Scott Taylor, Marcus Pregent, Craig Sheeley, Mike MacDonald, Ross Winn, Mike Pondsmith, Colin Tipton, and Michael Todd (1992) [CP3181]
- Chrome Compilation A: Chromebook 1/2, (2000) [RT3521]- Reprint of Chromebook and Chromebook 2 in one volume.
- Chromebook 3, by David Ackerman, Heath Brewer, David Chart, David Cripps, Lester Connors, Michael LaBossiere, Marcus Pregent, James Pucket, Jean-M. Ringuet, Mike Roter, Steve Sabram, Marck Schuman, Steven Schultz, Craig Sheeley, Scott Taylor, Colin Tipton, Michael Todd, Ross Winn, Benjamin Wright, Derek Quintanar (1994) [CP3331]
- Chromebook 4, by Derek Quintanar (1996) [CP3471]
- Chrome Compilation A: Chromebook 3/4, () [RT3511] - Reprint of Chromebooks 3 and 4 in one volume.
- Corporation Report 2020, Vol 1, by William Moss (1991) [CP3111] - Arasaka & International Electric Company.
- Corporation Report 2020, Vol 2, by William Moss (1992) [CP3151] - Lazarus Group & Militech.
- Corporation Report 2020, Vol 3, by William Moss (1992) [CP3161] - Petrochem & SovOil.
- Edgerunners, Inc., (1995) [CP3391] - A graymarket temp agency for the characters. Details companies, NPCs and scenarios.
- Eurosource, (1991) [CP3901]
- Eurosource Plus, (1995) [CP3421]
- Home of the Brave, by Michael MacDonald and Doug Anderson (1992) [CP3221] - Sourcebook detailing America in 2020.
- Live & Direct: Multimedia in the Cyberpunk Age, (1996) [CP3431] - Media character class manual.
- Maximum Metal by Mark Colborn, Craig Sheeley, and Derek Quintanar (1993) [CP3191] - Military vehicles sourcebook. Includes vehicle construction rules.
- Neo Tribes, by Winn Ross (1994) [CP3371] - Nomad character class manual.
- Night City, by Colin Fisk (1991) [CP3501] - Night City sourcebook and map.
- Pacific Rim Sourcebook, (1994) [CP3311] - Sourcebook detailing Korea, Japan, China, Southeast Asia, and Australasia in 2020.
- Protect & Serve, by Geoff Pass & Mike LaBossiere (1992) [CP3171] - Law Enforcement character class manual.
- Rache Bartmoss' Brainware Blowout, by David Ackerman-Gray, Edward Bolme, Mike Pondsmith, Craig Sheeley, Chris Williams, Benjamin Wright (1996) [CP3521] - Compendium of Cyberdeck Programs and Netgear (some converted from the Netrunner collectible card game). Has Netrunner CCG to Cyberpunk 2020 conversion rules to incorporate the cards into a gamemaster's campaign.
- Rache Bartmoss' Guide to the Net, (1993) [CP3241] - An atlas and guide to the Virtual Net in 2020.
- Rough Guide to the UK: Riding the Edge to 2020s Britain, Nick Gilliott (1994) [CP3281] - Sourcebook detailing the United Kingdom in 2020.
- Solo Of Fortune 2, (1994) [CP3361]
- When Gravity Fails, by David Ackerman, Will Moss, Chris Williams, and Chris Hockabout (1992) [CP3601] - Sourcebook about the novel When Gravity Fails by George Alec Effinger.
- Wildside, by Benjamin Wright and Michael Roter (1993) [CP3271] - Fixer character class. Includes information about Organized Crime in Cyberpunk 2020.

==== Adventures ====
- Eurotour, (1993) [CP3131]
- Firestorm: Stormfront - The Fourth Corporate War, Book 1, (1997) [RT3481]
- Firestorm: Shockwave - The Fourth Corporate War, Book 2, (1997) [RT3491]
- Land of the Free (Box Set), (1994) [CP3231] - America in 2020. Contains campaign book, map of America, 25mm-scale cardstock vehicle sheets, and various props and handouts.
- Tales from the Forlorn Hope, (1992) [CP3121]
- When the Chips Are Down, (1990) [CP3801] - included in Data Screen 2.0.2.0 - Game Master's screen.

==== Misc ====
- Data Screen 2.0.2.0., (1990) [CP3801] - Game Master's screen + When the Chips Are Down, a 32 pages Cyberpunk 2020 scenario.
- Cyberpunk 2.0.2.0 Character Sheets, (1993) [CP3321] - 24 two-sided character sheets plus 16 pages of NPC forms.

=== Atlas Games ===
Atlas Games, a game publisher better known for their award-winning fantasy RPG Ars Magica, released several licensed adventures for Cyberpunk in the early 1990s.

==== Adventures ====
- All Fall Down, by Andrew Borelli (1992) [AG5040] - A heist in New Las Vegas places the characters in the midst of a Corporate civil war.
- The Arasaka Brainworm, by Thomas M. Kane, (1991) [AG5000] - An unnamed patron hires a discreet fixer to hire the characters for a sensitive job in which they must acquire something to be detailed later.
- The Bonin Horse, by Eric Heisserer (1993) [AG5050] - Arasaka hires the characters to retrieve "Project 9" from a sunken submarine.
- Cabin Fever, by Eric Heisserer (1994) [AG5065] - The characters are trapped on a freighter during a toxic spill.
- Chasing the Dragon, by Michael Sechi (1992) [AG5035] - A very important briefcase has been stolen from the wrong people and the characters are blamed. They have to go deep into the Combat Zone to get it back from the real thief - The Dragon - before he makes his escape (or the case's irate owners catch up with them).
- The Chrome Berets, by Thomas Kane (1992) [AG5025] - The characters are military advisors for the government fighting in a three-way war in the Malagasy Islands (a fictional island that was formerly part of the Philippines) between a bloc of corporations, a dictatorship, and left wing revolutionaries (that also include right wing nationalists, Chinese workforce refugees and illegal immigrants). Includes mass combat rules for CP2020.
- Greenwar, by Thomas Kane (1994) [AG5055] - The characters are involved in a hostile takeover bid. They must acquire a company without damaging it or lowering its stock value.
- Night City Stories, by Scott Mackay, (1992) [AG5005] - Four interconnected adventures set in Night City.
- Northwest Passage, by Andrew J. Lucas and Jeff Ranger (1995) [AG5070] - The characters are mercenaries involved in a data-theft heist from a floating rig platform off the Alaskan coast.
- The Osiris Chip, by Thomas Kane (1992) [AG5010] - The characters are invited by a local gang to help them hijack a Humanatech cargo shipment, something called "Project Osiris".
- Streetfighting, by Andrew Borelli, Woody Elbom, Thomas M. Kane, Brian Perry, and Jonathan Tweet (1993) [AG5020] - Collection of 7 mini-adventures.
- Thicker than Blood, by Alison Brooks (1993) [AG5045] - Scenario set at a Corporate-sponsored private school for talented and gifted children. A woman from the Sprawl wants the characters to find and return her kidnapped son.

=== Ianus Games ===
The Canadian company Ianus Games, currently known as Dream Pod 9, released several third-party supplements and adventure modules. Noteworthy among them was the sourcebook Night's Edge that took the basic Cyberpunk 2020 setting and blended in horror elements such as werewolves and vampires. Several Ianus Games adventures explored these themes further.

==== Cyberpunk 2020 Books ====
- King of the Concrete Jungle, by Hans Guevin (1994) [ICP106] - The power elite of Neo-Montreal hold a yearly contest to see who can acquire the most impressive "thing"; the losers each owe the winner a favor. The characters get dragged into this year's contest.
- Media Junkie I - Take One, by Gilles Bussiere (1993) [ICP107] - The patron wants the characters to retrieve ten old films for their collection. Contains the first four scenarios.
- Media Junkie II - Final Cut, by Gilles Bussiere (1993) [ICP114] - The patron wants the characters to retrieve ten old films for their collection. Contains the last six scenarios.
- Premature Burial, by Justin Schmid (1994) [ICP117] - The characters rescue a badly beaten and wounded man who claims to be a powerful Corporate named Julius Romero. He enlists the characters in a plot to get even with his bosses, who tried to kill him. However, they find that Julius Romero isn't missing and someone is killing his rivals. Who is the patron and what is really going on?
- Remember Me, by Justin Schmid (1994) [ICP118] - A campaign with four linked scenarios concerning the unreliability of memory. The characters are medias who got a copy of a video that can link Arasaka to a brutal massacre. Or...the characters are police who are hunting down a cop killer. Or...the characters are seriously mentally ill patients who need to break out of their asylum. Or...the characters are edgerunners trying to rescue an ally from a cult's compound. The characters are all four...but, which one (if any) are they really?
- Sub-Attica, by Lucien Soulban (1994) [ICP120] - The characters are sentenced to an underwater prison. Includes 8 scenarios.

==== Night's Edge Series ====
- Bloodlust, by Stephane Brochu (1995) [ICP108] - Vampire characters in Night's Edge.
- Crashpoint, by Jeff Boman (1995) [ICP112] - Unusual deaths. Includes Neo-Voodoo rules and details organlegging in Night's Edge.
- Dark Metropolis, by Justin Schmid (1994) [ICP116] - Sourcebook about The City in Night's Edge. Includes new drug design and equipment malfunction rules.
- Grimm's Cybertales, by Justin Schmid (1993) [ICP110] - Each chapter covers a different subject. Subjects include A New Order (Stress and Psychosis rules), Apostles of the Edge (Cults in 2020), Neo-Voodoo (Voodoo in Night's Edge), The Boogey-Men of 2020 (Stalkers, Serial Killers, Terrorists, Junkie Burnouts, etc.), Ghosts in the Machine (The Net in Night's Edge), Perchance to Dream (Fatigue, Sleep and Dreaming rules), and Ars Nova (Magic rules and skills in Night's Edge).
- Home Front, Stephane Brochu (1994) [ICP119] - A brutal home invasion leaves the father dead, the mother in shock, and the teenaged son missing - perhaps kidnapped. Later a string of murders occurs in the same neighborhood, all of them men with families. The characters need to investigate and stop the killings.
- Necrology I - Of Death, Life and Afterwards..., by Justin Schmid (1992) [ICP102] - Details the Flatlining craze, in which users experience "death" for 2 minutes.
- Necrology II - And Now I Lay Me Down, by Justin Schmid (1993) [ICP104] - An unkillable serial killer called the Boogey Man stalks The City at night.
- Necrology III - Immortality, by Justin Schmid (1993) [ICP105] - The characters are kidnapped and brought to a medical research facility.
- Night's Edge, by Justin Schmid (1992) [ICP101] - An alternate Cyberpunk universe in which psychic powers and the supernatural exist. Includes templates for Vampires, Werewolves, and Vampire Hunters; Psychic rules; and stats for new gear and weapons.
- Playground, by Lucien Soulban (1994) [ICP115] - Welcome to the Playgrounds, Virtual Reality parks where your dreams come true. But what about your nightmares..?
- Survival of the Fittest, by Gilles Bussiere (1993) [ICP103] - Rumors are that a serial killer is roaming The City, ritually killing his victims by draining their blood. The characters are hired to find a missing person.

=== Stratelibri / Giochi Uniti ===
An Italian company that takes care of translation and distribution. They also independently produced a third-party setting sourcebook in the early '90s.

==== Sourcebooks ====
- Nathan Never (1994) [SL4200] - Sourcebook based on Nathan Never, a popular series of science fiction comics by Sergio Bonelli Editore.

=== The Interface / Prometheus Press Inc. ===
The Interface was "The Magazine for the Cyberpunk Enthusiast" and was published on license from R Talsorian Games.

==== Issues ====
- Vol. 1, No. 1 (19??) covering Walking the Beat in Night City, Police profile: The Givers of Pain, Inmate Penal Corps, OTEC: Ocean Technology & Energy Corp.
- Vol. 1, No. 2 (1990) covering Police Profiles on Ripperdocs, Getting Along; Cool and Empathy in Cyberpunk, Hardware Closeup: The SEV-1, Subordinate/Alternative Character Class.
- Vol. 1, No. 3 (1991) covering NuTech, Revolution corporation, Artificial Intelligence, Reviews, Nu:programs, Altered States, Nuscience.
- Vol. 1, No. 4 (1991) covering Nomads, ConAg Corporation, AI's and Rogue Hunters, Reviews, To Bear Arms..., Alternate Character Class.
- Vol. 2, No. 1 (1992) covering Running the Media Game, Profiles, A Job with an Attitude, Pirate Media in 2020, Facing the Consequences, Reviews.
- Vol. 2, No. 2 (199?) covering EctoTech, Cults: Hopes and Horrors, A Policy of Pain, Conversion Rules to CoC, Reviews, Transference, Cult Profiles.

== Cybergeneration 2027 ==
=== R. Talsorian Games ===
==== Corebooks ====
- CyberGeneration - The Final Battle for the Future {1st Edition} (1993) [CP3251] - Sourcebook for running campaigns in an alternate future that takes place in 2027. Includes rules for YoGangs (juvenile sub-cultures) and the CyberEvolved (mutants genetically altered by an engineered plague).
- CyberGeneration - The Time for Change Is Now: Evolve or Die {2nd Edition}, (1995) [RTG3252] - Standalone version of the original CyberGeneration supplement.
- Eco Front (1993) [RTG3341] - Eco-Terrorism sourcebook. Includes new CyberEvolved (Scout) and new Yo-Gangs (NeoPioneers and Beastieboys).
- Media Front (1993) [RTG3351] - Propaganda sourcebook. Includes new CyberEvolved (Jammers) and new Yo-Gangs (Lookers and Taggers).
- Virtual Front (1994) [RTG3441] - Hacking sourcebook. Includes new Yo-Gangs (V-Punks and Networkers) and explains and expands the Wizard CyberEvolved type.

==== Adventure ====
- Bastille Day, by (1993) [RTG3261] - The characters are given a mission to break into a Bureau of Relocation concentration camp and break hackerette Spider Murphy out of a "re-education" center.

=== Firestorm Ink ===
==== Sourcebooks ====
- Generation Gap, by David Ackerman-Gray, Edward Bolme, Wade Racine, and Craig Sheeley (2000) [CG2001] - Life and growing up in 2027. Includes rules for integrating Edgerunners into a CyberGeneration campaign.
- Mile High Dragon, by Jonathan Lavallee and Bryan Schmidt (2009) [CG2002] - Sourcebook detailing the city of Denver in 2027. Includes a new YoGang (Buskers). Only available in PDF file format.
- Researching Medicine by Jonathan Lavallee and Bryan Schmidt (2003) [CG1001] - MedTechs in CyberGeneration. Includes a new YoGang (MASHers) and a new CyberEvolved type (The Medic).

== CyberPunk 203X ==
=== R. Talsorian Games ===
==== Core Books and Utilities ====
- Cyberpunk v3.0, by Michael Pondsmith et al. (2005) [CP4110]
- C3 Flash Pak (bundle), (2006) [RT4120] - GM's Screen, Mini Rulebook, new character templates, new gear, and random tables for generating adventures, NPCs, and environments.
- C3 DataPack (bundle), (2006) [RT4130] - Contains 4 combination character sheets / dossier folders, 4 AltCult status sheets, and a coupon for free official C3 dice by Chessex.
- C3 DataPack (bundle), (2006) [RT4130] - Contains 6 combination character sheets / dossier envelopes and 6 AltCult status sheets.

==== Sourcebooks ====
- Gangbook, James Carpio (2007) [RT4140] - Details 36 of the worst gangs in Night City. Includes stats for important NPCs and new weapons, gear, and vehicles.
- AltCult Insider 1: Beyond The Edge, (2008) [RT04160] - Edgerunner AltCult sourcebook. Includes Cybernetics design rules and stats for new weapons, vehicles, gear, and enhanced cybernetics (NuCybe).
- AltCult Insider 2: Riptide Revolution (Unpublished) - Riptide Confederation AltCult sourcebook.
- AltCult Insider 3: Deepwater (Unpublished) - Reef AltCult sourcebook.

== Interface magazine (Prometheus Press) ==
Interface was a glossy magazine about Cyberpunk published by Prometheus Press in six issues between 1990 and 1992.

== Grenadier Models Inc. ==
Grenadier made sets of 25mm lead miniatures for Cyberpunk.

- Cyberpunk Miniatures {box set} [GDR3005] - A set of 10 miniatures.
- Edgerunner Miniatures {box set} [GDR3006] - A set of 10 miniatures.
- Cyberpunk {Blister Packs}
  - Cyberpunk [GDR3402] - 3 Solos
  - Cyberpunk [GDR3403] - 3 Rockers
  - Cyberpunk [GDR3404] - 2 Nomads (1 cyberbike with rider & 1 dismounted Nomad on foot)
  - Cyberpunk [GDR3405] - 3 Cops
  - Cyberpunk [GDR3406] - 3 Gangers (VooDoo Boyz)
  - Cyberpunk [GDR3407] - 3 Gangers (The Bozos)
