= Night City =

Night City or a variant, may refer to:

== Music ==
- Night City, a 1988 album by Joe Hisaishi, see Joe Hisaishi discography
- "Night City", a 1968 song by Don Ellis off the album Shock Treatment
- "Night City (Tokyo)", a 1995 song by Black Rain off the album 1.0
  - "Night City.Ambient", a remix of the song
- "Night City", a 2004 song by Bill Laswell off the album Version 2 Version: A Dub Transmission
- "Night City", a 2008 song by Jorn off the album Lonely Are the Brave
- "Night City", a 2010 song by The Sword off the album Warp Riders

== Other uses ==
- Night City (Cyberpunk 2020), a 1991 supplement for the role-playing game Cyberpunk 2020
- Night City, a fictional setting of the role-playing game Cyberpunk 2077 and connected media; see also list of fictional towns and villages
- Night City, a 1982 poetry collection by Elena Kazantseva
- "The Night City", a 2002 horror short story by W. H. Pugmire

== See also ==
- Summer Night City, a song by ABBA
- One Night City, a 2014 manga by Osamu Kobayashi (illustrator)
- Night and the City (disambiguation)
- Night in the city (disambiguation)
- City of night (disambiguation)
- Night (disambiguation)
- City (disambiguation)
- Dark City (disambiguation)
