= The King Over the Water =

The King Over the Water is a 1984 role-playing game adventure published by Fantasy Games Unlimited for Privateers and Gentlemen.

== Plot summary ==
The King Over the Water is an adventure in which the player characters are aboard His Majesty's sloop Dolphin during the Seven Years' War in February 1758. One player assumes the role of captain, while others take subordinate positions. The adventure leads them to Holland, where they investigate the arrival of Bonnie Prince Charlie. A historical campaign setting is also included based on the Acre campaign in Syria (March-May 1799), complete with biographical summaries and stats for key figures.

== Publication history ==
The King Over the Water was written by Jon Williams and J. Andrew Keith, and was published by Fantasy Games Unlimited in 1984 as a 32-page book.

== Reception ==
Jeff Seiken reviewed The King Over the Water and Decision at Djerba for Different Worlds magazine and stated that "both supplements exemplify the same high spirit of adventure and excitement that so strongly distinguishes Privateers & Gentlemen."
