= Aristoi (novel) =

1992 novel by Walter Jon Williams

- Cover of first edition (hardcover); The cover art for Aristoi was nominated for the 1993 Hugo Award for Best Original Artwork.
- Author: Walter Jon Williams
- Cover artist: Jim Burns
- Language: English
- Genre: Science fiction
- Publisher: Tor Books
- Publication date: 1992
- Publication place: United States
- Media type: Print (hardback & paperback)
- Pages: 448
- ISBN: 0-312-85172-3
- OCLC: 26158330
- Dewey Decimal: 813/.54 20
- LC Class: PS3573.I456213 A89 1992

Aristoi is a 1992 science fiction novel by American writer Walter Jon Williams.

== Overview ==
The novel describes the Logarchy, a technologically advanced human society which has spread across half the galaxy. It involves a rigid hierarchy of social classes, based on examinations. The supreme class, the "Aristoi", are given the ultimate responsibility: that of managing nanotechnology.

The Aristoi (and some others) can split their minds into daimones, or "limited personalities", all which can operate as independent mental entities guided by the will of the main 'self' of the Aristos. There are several rituals designed to bring the main personality into contact with his own daimones and establish organization and control among them. In virtual reality, deployed through an implanted brain–computer interface, these selves can even be manifested as distinct individuals. The daimones can work on various projects independently without using the body, so that many things can be accomplished in a fraction of the time it would take a single-minded person to do them. People who have daimones are not considered to be out of their minds, but rather into their minds, and are respected as knowing themselves much more thoroughly than is possible to a single-minded person.

Williams frequently divides the text into two columns representing characters' simultaneous interactions with multiple daimones and/or outside persons (for example, events of a party on one side, Gabriel's daimones commenting amongst themselves on the other). In electronic versions of the text, the two-column device is abandoned for clarity, as stated in the new author's note.

Virtual reality is referred to as "oneirochronon", a Greek-rooted word literally meaning "dream time". The "Hyperlogos" stores all human knowledge on gigantic servers placed inside Earth's moon and the moons of other planets. The device used for the interface is a tiny implant called a "reno", suggesting a link to Williams' earlier cyberpunk novels Hardwired and Solip:System which deal with a near-future Earth.

In the future of the Logarchy, the original earth was destroyed by "Mataglap Nano", a gray goo disaster which originated in Indonesia (thus the name, which means berserk in Indonesian). A second Earth has been created, and the Logarchy was formed as a response to the tragedy.

The Logarchy is reminiscent of some of the ideas of Plato. The Aristoi, the only people authorized to develop and use nanotechnology, are the unquestioned rulers of humanity, somewhere between government and gods. Each Aristos controls a domaine comprising one or more planets on which they impose their rules and modify so that it resembles the Aristoi's individuality. For example, if an Aristos/Ariste is interested in architecture, his/her domaine will reflect that through its educational system and the structure of its buildings. On the worlds controlled by the Logarchy, ordinary people (the "Demos") live in relative ease and comfort. All serious illnesses have been wiped out, and injuries can be fully healed. The chief responsibility of the Aristoi is to ensure that the people on their planets enjoy the best of health and are able to reach their utmost potential (including becoming an Aristos, if the appropriate exams are passed). The Aristoi interact with their subjects personally, often, to supply guidance and encouragement.

The society controlled by the Logarchy works on a rigid hierarchy of social classes. One's position is determined through examination (as in Imperial China), so that everyone has an opportunity to advance in any field or fields they choose. In the Logarchy, children are trained from an early age in the precepts of Captain Yuan, the founder, in a combination of wushu, psychophysiology, cold reading and operant conditioning. For example, they are conditioned to respond to certain mudras or hand signals with specified emotional and physical reactions. A skillful practitioner can employ these poses and signals to manipulate others without their knowledge.

Via the reno, or microminiaturized personal computer implanted in the brain in childhood, people have access to unlimited amounts of information about everything. The only restricted information is that which is protected under the "Seal Of Aristoi".

Homosexuality is accepted, and same-sex couples can have children. The novel, in fact, opens with a scene in which the protagonist Gabriel performs "minor" surgery to impregnate his lover, Marcus. Transgender people and men who want to experience pregnancy and birth as women can avail themselves of a "nanologic" package which changes physical sex over a period of months.

The demos or ordinary people revere their domaine leaders as Gods. Gabriel's mother (without Gabriel's desire or approval) runs a church devoted to worship of Gabriel.

Between the aristoi and demos is the class of therapontes (from the Classical Greek therapon, variously meaning a henchman, attendant, squire, or companion in battle) who act as a managerial class carrying out the directives of the aristoi. There are a number of levels of therapontes, and those at the highest level are allowed to take the examinations to advance to aristos rank.

== Plot ==
Gabriel, a minor Aristos, runs a group of planets containing societies devoted to artistic pursuits, assisted by his several daimones, each of whom has his or her own personality and special area of interest. Attending oneirochronon parties and composing operas, having sex with both men and women (at one point, he has sex with two women at once—one in physical reality, one in the oneirochronon), he seems to live a leisurely, decadent life.

An elder Ariste, Cressida, warns Gabriel that something is up in a nearby solar system. There appear to be some extra planets in an area which astronomical surveys had said contained none. Cressida is murdered before she can explain more but Gabriel begins to suspect that Saito, the Aristos whose domain is closest to the mystery solar system, is using it for some undisclosed purpose.

Gabriel and some of his advisers leave on a secret mission to the mystery solar system. When they arrive there they discover a horrifying truth: the planets contain life, human life. The most advanced of the planets contains a society similar in nature and technological development to Renaissance Europe. The people here have been left without the guidance and control of an Aristos and are mired in constant warfare and squalor, perishing of diseases which modern technology can easily cure. Someone, presumably Saito, has created human life here and consigned it to perpetual suffering for some unknown reason.

Horrified by the suffering they see, Gabriel and some of his companions travel down to the planet to investigate. Posing as visitors from a distant country they identify a local nobleman whom they believe to be Saito and arrange a confrontation. While they are waiting for their chance to assassinate Saito they see their spaceship, which had been orbiting the planet, destroyed. Their assassination attempt fails when they realize that the nobleman is actually an artificial lifeform. Gabriel and his companions are captured and imprisoned.

It is then that Gabriel is confronted with the truth: the mastermind behind this horrifying experiment is not Saito, but Captain Yuan, the architect of the current galactic civilization, who had long been presumed dead. Yuan explains his motives behind creating new life: the galactic society of the Logarchy has become staid and stultifying. Protected from any danger, the people have stopped improving and have become slaves of the Aristoi. He created this new solar system and the life within it in order to give a new start to humanity and create a society free from the restrictions of the Logarchy.

Yuan, Saito, and Zhenling, an Ariste whom Gabriel had considered an ally and even taken as a lover, then begin a brainwashing program on Gabriel, eventually breaking his will and convincing him to help them with minor duties on their project. Their plan is foiled when a previously hidden sub-personality of Gabriel, that he dubs The Voice, uses his computer privileges to escape.

Gabriel manages to defeat Saito and escape along with his friends. He informs the rest of the Logarchy about what has happened and rallies them to a war footing. The Logarchy's forces swarm into the new solar system to provide humanitarian relief and begin to integrate the societies into the galactic society. As Yuan's secrets are revealed it is also discovered that he had tampered with the examination process which forms the backbone of the Logarchy, promoting people to Aristoi who he believed could help him and keeping others back. Captain Yuan himself has escaped to parts unknown and Gabriel makes it his life's mission to track him down and bring him to justice. As he does so he is warned by Zhenling, now imprisoned, that in doing so he will only fulfill Yuan's plan to shake up the galactic status quo.

== Critical reception ==
According to Kirkus Reviews: "Williams's high-tech utopia effectively draws on the hot ideas in current science and technology to ask provocative questions about the goals of human society. Space opera with brains and panache—tough, fast-moving, and very well written."
