= Decision at Djerba =

Decision at Djerba is a 1984 role-playing game adventure published by Fantasy Games Unlimited for Privateers and Gentlemen.

== Plot summary ==
Decision at Djerba is an adventure in which the player characters take command of the 36-gun frigate Galatea in 1799 in the Mediterranean following the Acre campaign. The characters lead a blockading squadron near the French-controlled port of Djerba. The scenario is modular, allowing for multiple mini-adventures based on random events and player initiative, with possible missions including itntercepting a French corvette carrying dispatches, launching a raid on anchored transports, or reacting to the breakout of a massive Franco-Spanish fleet from Cartagena. The supplement also includes guidelines for a Heart of Oak miniatures campaign.

== Publication history ==
Decision at Djerba was written by J. Andrew Keith and published by Fantasy Games Unlimited in 1984 as a 20-page book.

== Reception ==
Jeff Seiken reviewed The King Over the Water and Decision at Djerba for Different Worlds magazine and stated that "both supplements exemplify the same high spirit of adventure and excitement that so strongly distinguishes Privateers & Gentlemen."
