= Arasaka =

Arasaka may refer to:

- Arasaka Corporation, a fictional company in the Cyberpunk 2077 universe
- The Arasaka Brainworm
