= City on Fire (Williams novel) =

1997 novel by Walter Jon Williams

- First edition
- Author: Walter Jon Williams
- Cover artist: Phil Heffernan and Tim White
- Language: English
- Genre: Science fiction
- Publisher: HarperPrism
- Publication date: 1997
- Publication place: United States
- Media type: Print (hardback & paperback)
- Pages: 498
- ISBN: 0-06-105213-2
- OCLC: 35741994
- Dewey Decimal: 813/.54 21
- LC Class: PS3573.I456213 C58 1997
- Preceded by: Metropolitan

City on Fire is a fantasy novel by American writer Walter Jon Williams, first published in 1997 and nominated for the Nebula Award (for Best Novel) in 1997 and the Hugo Award (for Best Novel) in 1998. It is the sequel to 1995's Metropolitan.

== Plot summary ==
The story begins shortly after the point where Metropolitan left off, with Aiah, the previous novel's protagonist, arriving in "Free Caraqui" to assist Constantine in his ambitions. In Caraqui, Constantine is confronted with intrigues among the other power players from the revolution, counter-coups, and war with the surrounding metropolises. He must also deal with the consequences of enlisting one of his more disturbing allies, Taikoen. Centuries previous, Taikoen was a powerful mage whose name passed into legend; he eventually transformed into a "hanged man," an entity of pure plasm whose only remaining drive is to possess other human beings and use their bodies to experience sensual pleasures until his victims die extremely gruesome deaths as a side effect of the possession. Constantine had made a pact with Taikoen to provide him bodies to feed on in exchange for destroying certain of his enemies, but is now wracked with guilt for doing this and is conflicted between his need to use Taikoen to further his ambitions and his worry that he has unleashed a monster he cannot control.

Aiah eventually grows to become a minor power in her own right in Caraqui, serving as a government liaison to some Barkazi mercenary units Constantine has hired to defend Caraqui (among many others). Aiah befriends a military mage from one of those units who helps her eventually destroy Taikoen.

Despite the conflict still raging, Constantine works to pursue his ultimate plan for the New City - nothing less than the destruction of the Shield that imprisons humanity in the world and the confrontation of whatever powers placed it there. Seeing plasm as the key to humanity's liberation, he enlists the help of Rohder, one of Aiah's old colleagues from the Plasm Authority in Jaspeer (and a minor character in Metropolitan). A centuries-old researcher-mage, Rohder had discovered new geometric properties that could boost the production of plasm in cities, with the unfortunate need to completely reorder their infrastructure at prohibitive cost. Fortunately, Caraqui is a metropolis built on pontoons in the shallows of one of the world's seas, so Constantine enables him to experiment by physically moving parts of the city in concordance with his theory, which proves valid.

Aiah also stumbles onto the knowledge that at periodic intervals, a small hole opens up in the Shield through which plasm-based constructs can be sent. At the same time, she has been having dreams in which she sees entities named the Sun and Moon outside the Shield; these celestial bodies are mostly legend in the world, but there is a belief that the tides seen in the world's seas are caused by the effects of their gravity, which is able to pass through the Shield. Aiah learns that her dreams have similarities with the teachings of a mysterious monastic order in Caraqui, the Dreaming Sisters. At the novel's conclusion, Aiah seems to join the Dreaming Sisters in their curious form of meditation as a way of discovering what her dreams mean in the context of freeing the world from the Shield.

== Status of possible sequel ==
Metropolitan and City on Fire were published by HarperCollins, a result of Williams attempting to move to a publisher that would pay and promote him better than Tor Books, his previous publisher. However, his editor was fired and the HarperPrism line cancelled soon after City on Fire was published. As a result, Williams would not be able to have a third volume in the series published without retrieving the rights for the first two and finding another publisher for them, along with the third book. Given the difficulty Williams had already encountered, he decided to pursue other projects with a more immediate payoff.

The rights for the two books reverted to Williams in December 2010, although he did not learn this until April 2012. On March 12, 2022, Williams announced on his blog that he's currently writing the third book, tentatively titled Heaven in Flames.
