= The Green Leopard Plague =

Short story by Walter Jon Williams

2010 collection, cover art by Andrew Kim

"The Green Leopard Plague" is a 2004 science fiction novella by Walter Jon Williams. It was first published in Asimov's Science Fiction. In 2010, Night Shade Books republished it in The Green Leopard Plague and Other Stories (ISBN 978-1597801775). It also appears in The Best of Walter Jon Williams collection.

== Synopsis ==
Centuries after the introduction of a genetically engineered virus allows humans to photosynthesize food, leading the world to a post-scarcity society, a mermaid makes her living by searching old archives. She is approached by a customer who wants her to find information on the man who founded the theoretical background on which their civilization is based, John Terzian. It is eventually revealed that he was involved in the release of the photosynthesis virus. The story then veers back and forward between his story and the mermaid's.

== Accolades ==
The Green Leopard Plague won the 2004 Nebula Award for Best Novella,. It was a finalist for the 2004 Hugo Award for Best Novella.
