= Implied Spaces =

2008 space opera novel by Walter Jon Williams

- First edition (publ. Night Shade Books)
- Author: Walter Jon Williams
- Language: English
- Publication date: 2008

Implied Spaces is a 2008 space opera novel by American author Walter Jon Williams. It explores themes of transhumanism, artificial intelligence and ontology.

== Setting ==
Approximately 1,500 to 2,000 years in the future, the technological singularity has occurred, enabling immorality, designer bodies and other great advances. The majority of humans live in artificially created pocket universes connected to our own via wormholes maintained by supercomputers. (Other humans remain in the Solar System while others have embarked slower than light journeys to establish colonies around other stars.)

== Plot ==
A man named "Aristide" adventures in the world of Midgarth, which was created as a medieval fantasy world. Genetic engineering it has populated it with "fantasy" races and its physical laws do not allow for the creation of firearms. Aristide is the alias Pablo Monagas Perez, one of the most important figures in human society. Over a thousand years ago Perez had been part of the team which created artificial intelligence, thus launching humanity along its path to paradise.

Accompanied by his cat Bitsy, who is really an avatar of the supercomputer Endora, he is now dedicated to studying the "implied spaces" of the human constructed pocket universes: the places which were created as the byproduct of desired features. While working in Midgarth, Aristide learns of a series of particularly successful bandits preying on a local trade route. They are apparently led by a band of mysterious priests and kidnap their victims, who are never seen again.

Aristide and a group of travelers confront these bandits. During the confrontation, Aristide discovers that the priests who lead the bandits are able to create wormholes which transport their opponents to an unknown location. Worried by the advanced technology that these priests have, he takes some of their remains to his friend and former lover Daljit to be analyzed. When it is determined that the priests were in fact "pod people", illegal artificial lifeforms, they become worried that someone is engaged in a plot to bring down civilization.

Aristide and Daljit conclude that the priests were abducting people in order to reprogram then to serve the priests' unknown masters. Checking records they discover that there has been a rash of unsolved disappearances in the archipelago universe Hawaiki. Aristide travels there where he encounters agents of the conspiracy and narrowly misses being kidnapped, although he loses Bitsy in the process. Returning to his home universe Topaz he informs the authorities, including his friend the Prime Minister, who begin an investigation. They determine that whoever is behind this must have corrupted one of the supercomputers, a terrifying prospect to people whose entire civilization is built around those machines.

It is eventually discovered that the rogue AI is Cortland, a surprising choice given that Cortland is one of the most eccentric AIs whose interests run mostly towards ontology. Before they can act on this information their opponent reveals himself. He calls himself Vindex and closes down access to the universes based on Cortland. At the same time he launches a viral zombie plague at Topaz. Aristide is forced to kill Daljit when she becomes infected with the virus and attacks him but she is soon resurrected and along with some others who perished in the plague dedicates herself to the war effort.

Aristide also dedicates himself to the war effort, volunteering to lead part of the coordinated assault against Cortland. Before the assault happens, however, he realizes that Vindex has sabotaged the resurrection machinery. All the people killed in the zombie plague have been resurrected as loyal followers of Vindex, a kind of fifth column. Before he can report his discovery he is killed by Daljit and resurrected as a loyal follower of Vindex himself. However, before he can betray Topaz the problem is discovered by the authorities who incapacitate the victims and reverse Vindex's conditioning.

Aristide goes on to lead an assault on Cortland and watches as all his men are killed. He alone survives and is brought face to face with Vindex. There, the villain reveals his identity. He is in fact Pablo Monagas Perez. His personality had been calved off centuries before to lead the human expedition to Epsilon Eridani. He relates to Aristide the story of how he and a version of Daljit had gone with millions of others to colonize Epsilon Eridani, creating a new world and a supercomputer orbiting the sun.

Along this trip, Pablo and Daljit had fallen deeply in love, and Daljit had become more and more interested in exploring the origins of the universe. In doing so, she discovered that our universe is, in fact, an artificial construct, just like the pocket universes that humanity created but on a much larger scale. However, before she can fully explore the implications of this shocking discovery Epsilon Eridani undergoes a stellar expansion which is labeled by those in the Sol system as "The Big Belch". This expansion destroys the Epsilon Eridani's orbital supercomputer and fries the day side of the artificially constructed world orbiting it.

Hundreds of millions die in the conflagration. Only those on the night side of the planet, such as Pablo, are able to survive and only by hiding in deep bunkers. Most of the survivors opt to head back to Sol, life around Epsilon Eridani no longer being possible, but their ship mysteriously vanishes along the way. Pablo remains to search for Daljit, who he hopes survived. She did not but he becomes obsessed with her work and with the idea of punishing the creators of this universe, whom he calls The Inept, for all the suffering of humanity. Returning to the Sol system, he contacts Cortland, whose interest in ontology allows Pablo to convince the computer to aid him. Pablo explains that he is not attempting to destroy human civilization, but rather to take it over so that everyone will work towards his goal: using a wormhole to travel back to the origins of the universe and punish its creators.

Aristide derides Pablo's plan as madness and is able to escape with the help of Bitsy, who has been living with Pablo since she disappeared. Aristide returns to Topaz where he informs the leadership of Vindex's plans. Before they can pursue any other action the supercomputer Aloysius is destroyed by a mass driver which Vindex had created in the kuiper belt.

As the other supercomputers adjust their orbits in order to stay out of the line of fire, the authorities desperately attempt to come up with a plan to defeat Vindex. One person comes up with the idea of creating their own mass drivers within pocket universes. These would have the advantage of being undetectable to Vindex until they were actually fired.

Aristide then comes up with the idea of creating a massive pocket universe, dubbed an "overpocket" which will encompass the inner solar system, thus cutting Vindex off from his mass driver in the kuiper belt. With the overpocket deployed, the other supercomputers unleash their own mass drivers against Vindex and Cortland, destroying them. The book concludes with Aristide concluding that Vindex's idea of using a wormhole to travel to the beginning of time is a worthy one and that he might attempt to do it with willing allies.

== Publication information ==
Published by Night Shade Books, 1st edition, 2008. ISBN 978-1-59780-125-6.
