= Voice of the Whirlwind =

1987 cyberpunk science fiction novel by Walter Jon Williams

- First edition
- Author: Walter Jon Williams
- Cover artist: Luis Royo
- Language: English
- Genre: Science fiction
- Publisher: Tor Books
- Publication date: 1987
- Publication place: United States
- Media type: Print (hardback & paperback)
- ISBN: 0-312-93013-5
- OCLC: 148800899

Voice of the Whirlwind is a 1987 cyberpunk science fiction novel by American writer Walter Jon Williams. The novel is part of a series which includes Hardwired (1986) and "Solip:System" (1989).

== Plot introduction ==
Etienne Steward is a clone, also known as a beta. When he awakes, his memories are fifteen years old, because the original Steward—the alpha—apparently did not have his memories updated after the clone was created.

In those fifteen years, the entire world has changed. Countless friends of Steward have perished during these years. Steward Alpha's original employer, the Orbital Policorp, has collapsed in the aftermath of an off-planet war over alien artifacts. Steward Alpha fought in the war and was a commander of great renown, and afterwards was a member of humanity's alien diplomacy group. However, Steward Alpha has been murdered, resulting in the activation of his clone backup. Now Steward Beta must discover the murderer's identity while investigating the effect of alien influence on human society.
