= Angel Station (novel) =

1990 novel by Walter Jon Williams

- First edition
- Author: Walter Jon Williams
- Cover artist: Luis Royo
- Language: English
- Genre: Science fiction novel
- Publisher: Tor Books
- Publication date: 1990
- Publication place: United States
- Pages: 393
- ISBN: 0-312-93187-5
- OCLC: 19906566

Angel Station is a 1990 cyberpunk space opera science fiction novel by Walter Jon Williams.

== Plot introduction ==
Using faster-than-light technology based on captured singularities, the human race has colonized dozens of star systems.

Ubu Roy and his sister Beautiful Maria are down-on-their-luck traders on the edge of human space. In a last-ditch effort to make money to pay their debts and repair their aging spacecraft, they are reduced to searching uncharted space for singularities to capture and sell.

Ubu and Maria encounter an alien spacecraft, leading to humanity's first contact with an extraterrestrial species. The alien spacecraft is also experiencing financial difficulties.

The alien technology is stronger than humanity's in some areas (such as biotechnology) and weaker in other areas (such as applied physics), providing ample opportunities for trade between the two ships. Both ships become rich in their respective societies by repeated trade with each other. Each thinks they are taking advantage of the other.

However, Ubu and Maria's secret is discovered by their trading rivals, resulting in a struggle to determine who will control the lucrative trade with the aliens.

Ubu and Maria ultimately succeed through Ubu's better understanding of the alien race's psychology and Maria's genetically-engineered psychic abilities.
