= Metropolitan (novel) =

1995 novel by Walter Jon Williams

- Cover of first edition (hardcover)
- Author: Walter Jon Williams
- Cover artist: Phil Hefferman
- Language: English
- Genre: Science fiction
- Publisher: HarperPrism
- Publication date: 1995
- Publication place: United States
- Media type: Print (hardback & paperback)
- Pages: 342
- ISBN: 0-06-105212-4
- OCLC: 31411895
- Dewey Decimal: 813/.54 20
- LC Class: PS3573.I456213 M48 1995
- Followed by: City on Fire

Metropolitan is a fantasy novel by American writer Walter Jon Williams, first published in 1995. A sequel, City on Fire, was published in 1997.

== Setting ==
Metropolitan is set on an unnamed world where, in the distant past, some agency or agencies enclosed the planet in a barrier known as the Shield. The Shield emits light and heat, incinerates all matter that rises above a certain altitude, and absorbs all electromagnetic energy directed into it. As a result, the world has no day, night, or seasons (although it does have weather phenomena like clouds and rain). Its inhabitants divide time into "shifts", which appear to correspond to about eight hours (as they are referred to as "work", "service", and "sleep" shifts). The nature of who placed the Shield around the world, and why, is a major part of the theology of the world's many religions.

Over the millennia the population of the world has grown and all available land surface has been covered with a single city, divided into areas called metropolises that are analogous to nations. The metropolises have governments that span the gamut from democracies to dictatorships; "Metropolitan" is used as a title for powerful individuals who rule entire metropolises.

Life on the planet would be impossible without the existence of plasm, an energy responsive to human will that is created by the arrangement of matter (such as buildings, or the structural elements within buildings) in certain geometric patterns. When plasm arises, it can be tapped and used directly by humans, but is usually channeled into batteries so it can be used safely. In almost all cases, plasm sources are under the control of the metropolitan government, which either keeps the plasm for its own use or sells it to its citizens, like electricity or water. Plasm use is a form of magic, and its users are referred to as mages; among many other effects it can be used to create or transmute matter (for example, to manufacture food), perform medical treatments or genetic modifications, enhance senses, create illusions, and kill people with energy blasts.

== Plot summary ==
The novel's protagonist, Aiah, is a minor functionary for the Plasm Authority in the metropolis of Jaspeer; the Authority is the public utility company that taps plasm wells and sells the plasm (at very high rates) to those who would use it. Aiah is one of the Barkazi, an ethnic group whose metropolis, Barkazil, was engulfed by civil war several generations ago, its territory partitioned and occupied by the adjacent metropolises and its population dispersed as refugees. Barkazi religion centers around a trickster god, Karlo, who is constantly running scams on others, and the tradition of the scam, or chonah, is central to their culture. Aiah briefly studied plasm use at university, but ended her studies because of the high cost of the plasm required to continue them.

Working for an emergency response team investigating a huge flaming apparition of a woman that damages several city blocks, she discovers a previously unknown plasm well of tremendous power (the apparition being caused by a woman who blundered into the well and tapped the plasm directly, killing herself in the process). Instead of disclosing its location, she leads the Authority on a wild goose chase while trying to decide how best to use it to her advantage.

She decides to reveal it to Constantine, a resident of a luxury apartment complex near her own. Constantine is a skilled mage and visionary political theorist with dreams of moving the world beyond its stagnant situation. He became Metropolitan of his home metropolis and attempted to implement many reforms, but was betrayed, forced from power, and exiled by those closest to him. Aiah, an admirer of his political thought, discloses the plasm source to him so that he might make another attempt at realizing his plans for the "New City", asking only that she be made a part of whatever he carries out.

Aiah then effectively runs a chonah of enormous scale, misleading the Authority, dealing with her Barkazi extended family (who want a piece of whatever action she is in on) and the local organized crime group, keeping her Jaspeeri boyfriend (working in a distant metropolis) in the dark, and avoiding the potentially lethal attentions of Constantine's right-hand-woman, Sorya. Through all of this she has a love affair with Constantine and receives training in magery from him, for which she has a great deal of natural talent.

At the novel's climax, Aiah's plasm source, and her own magical assistance, is a crucial element when Constantine orchestrates a revolution in the metropolis of Caraqui and installs himself in its post-revolutionary power structure, from which position he hopes to enact his New City reforms. Realizing that she has no hope of using her full potential as a bureaucrat in Jaspeer, Aiah leaves her job, family, and relationship behind and travels to Caraqui to help Constantine achieve his dream.

== Reception ==
Metropolitan was nominated for the Nebula Award for Best Novel in the same year.

The SF Site's Donna McMahon praised Williams for "creat(in)g a complex world and plot" and "successfully weaving (its) details into his narrative without resorting to any awkward contrivances", noting as well that the "descriptions are excellent, and his characters are strong"; ultimately, she judged that although the book "unsatisfying", it was nevertheless "worth reading". Kirkus Reviews similarly felt that it was "by Williams's own high standards, unsatisfying", with a "curious, fascinating yet disconnected scenario".
