= Privateers and Gentlemen =

Tabletop Age of Sail role-playing game

- Cover art by Tom Freeman
- Designers: Jon Williams
- Publishers: Fantasy Games Unlimited
- Publication: 1983; 43 years ago
- Genres: Age of Sail

Privateers and Gentlemen is a role-playing game published by Fantasy Games Unlimited in 1983 that is set in the Royal Navy during the Age of Sail. The game combines role-playing and ship-to-ship combat. The game received generally positive reviews, although some critics questioned the blending of both role-playing and naval combat, the lack of any scenarios or adventures, and the disorganization of the rules.

== Description ==
Privateers and Gentlemen is a role-playing game in which players create characters who are naval officers serving on Royal Navy warships during the late 18th century, during the days of Admiral Horatio Nelson and C.S. Forrester's fictional Horatio Hornblower, sometimes called the "Age of Fighting Sail".

=== Components ===
The boxed set contains:

- Heart of Oak, a 48-page booklet of rules for miniatures combat that includes 8 pages of tables and ship cut-outs. (This booklet was previously published by FGU as a separate set of miniatures wargame rules.)
- Promotions and Prizes, a 32-page booklet about the role-playing system rules
- Tradition of Victory, a 32-page booklet containing historical background for the period
- A 6-page cardstock gamemaster's screen with reference charts
- A blank character sheet (to be photocopied)

=== Role-playing ===
Players create naval officer characters (usually as newly commissioned lieutenants) using a character generation system that has been characterized as "complex". Specific shipboard assignments for the new characters are determined randomly.

Rules for personal combat, sea encounters, and encounters with non-player characters are also included.

=== Ship-to-ship combat ===
A complete set of rules for naval combat using miniatures is also included, generally for one ship against another.

== Publication history ==
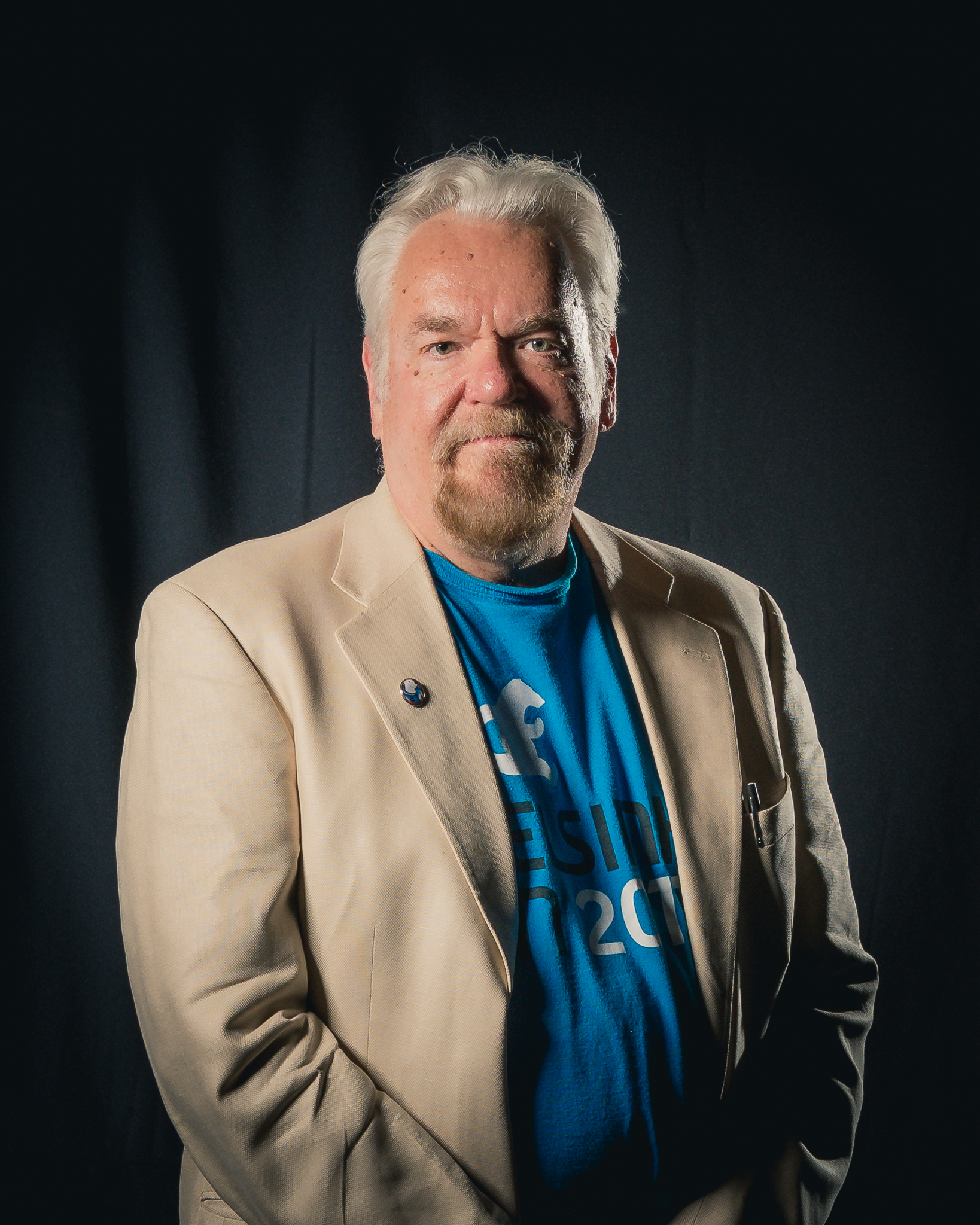
The game was designed by Walter Jon Williams (pictured in 2017).

In 1981, noted science fiction/cyberpunk author Walter Jon Williams, using the pen name "Jon Williams", published a series of nautical adventure novels known as the "Privateers and Gentlemen" series, The following year, Williams created Heart of Oak, a game of naval miniatures combat, which was published by FGU.

Williams then designed Privateers and Gentlemen, which incorporated both the previously published miniatures game Heart of Oak, and a new roleplaying system. The boxed set, featuring cover art by Tom Freeman and interior art by Mike Gilbert, was published by FGU in 1983.

FGU published two adventures for the game in 1984:

- Decision at Djerba — Game critic Rick Swan called this "a collection of miniadventures" that provide the game's "badly needed adventures."
- The King Over the Water — Swan called this "A nailbiting battle that takes place during a raging sea storm."

The UK magazine Imagine noted shortly after the game's publication that Privateers and Gentlemen "has been unusually successful for a historical RPG." However, Sean Patrick Fannon, writing in 1999, noted that the game had actually not done great business "but FGU fans loved [it] nonetheless."

In 1986, RAFM produced a miniature specifically for Privateers & Gentlemen called Jack Tar (JT01-JT014).

== Reception ==
In the December 1983 edition of Dragon (Issue #80), Ken Rolston found the inclusion of both a miniatures combat system and a roleplaying system resulted in a game that lacked focus. Rolston also found the rules "not particularly well-presented or well-organized. Reading them and playing them in the playtest of the miniatures rules was frustrating at times... [due to] ambiguities, difficulty of reference and disorganized presentation of procedures." Rolston was also disturbed by the lack of scenarios for either the miniatures game or the roleplaying system, which would force new gamemasters to make up scenarios and adventures themselves. He did believe that "Fans of sailing-ship fiction and those interested in historical role-playing games will be very happy with this game. It sacrifices detail of simulation for action and drama, but the tradeoff still retains a strong atmosphere with an effective mixture of heroic romanticism and grim realism... Since the atmosphere of Privateers and Gentlemen is a prime virtue, historical gamers will probably overlook the less-than-perfect rules presentation."

In the November 1983 edition of White Dwarf, Ian Waddelow found that Walter Jon Williams wrote the rulebooks "with humour and authority. He makes rule reading absorbing and informative." However, Waddelow criticized the game for its lack of dice and scenarios, but gave the game an overall rating of 9, saying, "This game is highly recommended, and can be played as pure wargaming, pure role-playing, or a mixture of the two. P&G is exciting, flexible and full of atmosphere."

Steve List reviewed Privateers and Gentlemen for Different Worlds magazine and stated that "Privateers And Gentlemen is a well-written game that suffers from a lack of scenarios, and further from a built-in lack of sex appeal except for those interested in the period. A gamemaster setting up a campaign will have to do a lot of work on his own, and will have to have players who are willing to learn enough about the period to be able to play their roles. Playing this game will not be easy, but the rewards for persisting will be enjoyment of a different kind of adventure. It is not a game for the masses, but for the discerning few for whom interest in the subject combines with an interest in role-playing rather than in power gaming."

Jane Vialls, writing about sexism within the role-playing game world, noted that Privateers and Gentlemen is "probably the ultimate example ... where female characters are virtually impossible."

In his 1990 book The Complete Guide to Role-Playing Games, game critic Rick Swan commented "There are few finer examples of historical RPGs than Privateers and Gentlemen, an elegant blend of tactical miniatures games and role-playing ... The game balances simplicity with detail to produce a vivid and compelling re-creation of naval warfare." Swan warned that the miniatures rules were fairly simple, noting, "hardcore wargamers may find these rules too simple for serious military simulations. However, they're quite exciting and easy to learn, complementing the dramatic elements of the role-playing game quite nicely." Swan did not like the random shipboard assignments, and suggested that players be allowed to choose their own assignments "with the referee reserving the right to veto inappropriate selections." As with other critics, Swan noted the "Poor organization and awkward editing" of the rules. Swan called the complete lack of scenarios on the referee since "both ship-to-ship engagements and role-playing are required to create a successful scenario." Swan concluded by giving the game a solid rating of 3 out of 4, saying, "Privateers and Gentlemen stands as an exceptional product by a designer who clearly knows his stuff."

In his 1991 book Heroic Worlds, Lawrence Schick noted the Anglo-centric focus of the game, commenting, "The game is very strong on historical detail for those sailors who are in the Royal Navy or are English privateers, but weak for other nationalities."

James Davis Nicoll in 2020 for Black Gate said "Having never played the game, the only impressions that remain with me are that it was very easy for an officer's career to go off the rails, consigned to half-pay or worse, and that one’s choices as to medical staff were limited to sadists, alcoholics, or alcoholic sadists."

== Other reviews and commentary ==
- Different Worlds #8 (June/July, 1980)
