= Joe Hisaishi discography =

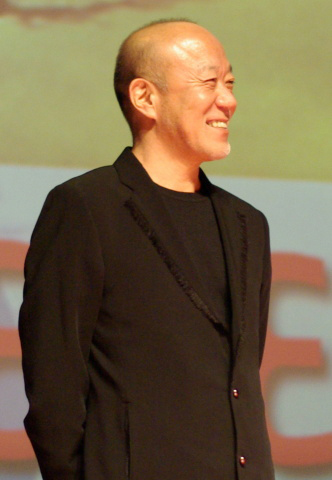
- Joe Hisaishi at the Deauville Asian Film Festival in 2008
- Studio albums: 28
- Soundtrack albums: 83
- Compilation albums: 13
- Video albums: 5

Japanese composer Joe Hisaishi has released 34 studio albums, 13 compilation albums, and 83 soundtrack albums. Hisaishi has also released five video albums.

== Albums ==
=== Studio albums ===
Year	Album details
1981	MKWAJU (ムクワジュ): Released: 21 August 1981; Label: Better Days, Columbia Records; Format: LP
1982	Information: Released: 25 October 1982; Label: Tokuma Japan; Format: LP
1985	α-BET-CITY (アルファベットシティ): Released: 25 June 1985; Label: Tokuma Japan; Format: CD
1986	Curved Music: Released: 25 September 1986; Label: Polydor Records; Format: CD
1988	Piano Stories: Released: 21 July 1988; Label: Polydor Records; Format: CD
1988	illusion: Released: 21 December 1988; Label: NEC Avenue; Format: CD
1989	Pretender: Released: 21 September 1989; Label: NEC Avenue; Format: CD
1991	I Am: Released: 22 February 1991; Label: Toshiba EMI; Format: CD
1992	My Lost City: Released: 12 February 1992; Label: Toshiba EMI; Format: CD
1994	Earthly Paradise: Released: 27 July 1994; Label: Pioneer LDC; Format: CD
1995	Melody Boulevard: Released: 25 January 1995; Label: Pioneer LDC; Format: CD
1996	Piano Stories II – The Wind of Life: Released: 25 October 1996; Label: Polydor Records; Format: CD
1997	Works I: Released: 15 October 1997; Label: Polydor Records; Format: CD
1998	Piano Stories III – Nostalgia: Released: 14 October 1998; Label: Polydor Records; Format: CD
1999	Works II: Released: 22 September 1999; Label: Polydor Records; Format: CD
2000	Shoot The Violist: Released: 17 May 2000; Label: Polydor Records; Format: CD
2002	Encore: Released: 6 March 2002; Label: Polydor Records; Format: CD
2003	Curved Music II: Released: 29 January 2003; Label: Universal Sigma; Format: CD
2004	Private: Released: 21 January 2004; Label: Wonderland Records; Format: CD
2005	Piano Stories IV – Freedom: Released: 26 January 2005; Label: Universal Sigma; Format: CD
2005	Works III: Released: 27 July 2005; Label: Universal Sigma; Format: CD
2006	Rakuen/Maldives: Released: 26 April 2006; Label: Wonderland Records; Format: CD
2006	Asian X.T.C.: Released: 4 October 2006; Label: Universal Sigma; Format: CD
2009	Another Piano Stories ~The End of the World~: Released: 18 February 2009; Label: Universal Sigma; Format: CD
2009	Minima Rhythm: Released: 12 August 2009; Label: Universal Sigma; Format: CD, DVD
2012	Vermeer & Escher: Released: 15 February 2012; Label: Wonder Land; Format: CD
2014	Works IV -Dream of W.D.O.-: Released: 8 October 2014; Label: Universal Sigma; Format: CD
2015	Minima_Rhythm 2 (ミニマリズム2): Released: 5 August 2015; Label: Universal Sigma; Format: CD
2017	Minima_Rhythm 3: Released: 2 August 2017; Label: Universal Music; Format: CD
2021	Minima_Rhythm 4: Released: 7 July 2021; Label: Universal Sigma; Format: CD
2023	A Symphonic Celebration: Released: 30 June 2023; Label: Deutsche Grammophon; Format: CD
2024	Joe Hisaishi In Vienna: Released: 28 June 2024; Label: Deutsche Grammophon; Format: CD
2025	Joe Hisaishi Conducts: Released: 8 August 2025; Label: Deutsche Grammophon; Format: Digital
2026	Symphony No. 3 (Metaphysica) & Harp Concerto: Released: 24 July 2026; Label: Deutsche Grammophon; Format: Digital

=== Compilation albums ===
Year	Album details
1992	Symphonic Best Selection: Released: 9 September 1992; Label: Toshiba EMI; Format: CD
1999	Best Selection: Released: 2 December 1999; Label: Pioneer LDC; Format: CD
2001	Joe Hisaishi Meets Kitano Films: Released: 21 June 2001; Label: Polydor Records; Format: CD
2001	Complete Best Selection: Released: 12 December 2001; Label: Pioneer LDC; Format: CD
2003	Best Live 2003: Released: 22 October 2003; Label: Island Records; Format: CD
2004	World Dreams: Released: 16 June 2004; Label: Universal Sigma; Format: CD
2005	American in Paris: Released: 30 November 2005; Label: Universal Sigma; Format: CD
2006	The Best Collection: Released: 7 June 2006; Label: Universal Sigma; Format: CD
2008	Hisaishi Meets Miyazaki Films: Released: 8 April 2008; Label: Milan Records; Format: Digital
2008	Piano Stories Best '88-'08: Released: 16 April 2008; Label: Universal Sigma; Format: CD
2010	Melodyphony: Best of Joe Hisaishi: Released: 27 October 2010; Label: Universal Sigma; Format: CD, DVD
2011	The Best of Cinema Music: Released: 7 September 2011; Label: Universal Sigma; Format: CD
2014	Ghibli Best Stories: Released: 12 March 2014; Label: Universal Sigma; Format: CD
2020	Dream Songs: The Essential Joe Hisaishi: Released: 21 February 2020; Label: Decca Gold; Format: CD, Digital
2021	Songs of Hope: The Essential Joe Hisaishi Vol. 2: Released: 20 August 2021; Label: Decca Gold; Format: CD, Digital

== Video albums ==
Year	Video details
2002	Quartet: Released: 25 March 2002; Format: DVD
2003	4Movement: Released: 19 March 2003; Format: DVD
2003	A Wish to the Moon – Joe Hisaishi & 9 Cellos 2003 Etude/Encore Tour: Released: 25 June 2003; Format: DVD
2006	W.D.O. (Joe Hisaishi and New Japan Philharmonic World Dream Orchestra): Released: 20 December 2006; Format: DVD
2009	Joe Hisaishi in Budokan – 25 Years with the Animations of Hayao Miyazaki: Released: 3 July 2009; Format: DVD, Blu-ray

== Soundtracks ==
Year	Album details
1984	Nausicaä of the Valley of the Wind (風の谷のナウシカ): Released: 25 February 1984; Label: Animage Records/Tokuma Japan; Format: CD
1984	W's Tragedy: Released: 21 December 1984; Label: Toshiba EMI; Format: CD
1985	Early Spring Tale (早春物語): Released 1 September 1985
1985	Arion: Released: 25 October 1985; Label: Animage Records/Tokuma Japan; Format: CD
1985	Haru no Kane (春の鐘): Released: 9 November 1985; Format: CD
1986	Laputa: Castle in the Sky (天空の城ラピュタ): Released: 25 August 1986
1986	Maison Ikkoku (めぞん一刻): Released: 25 October 1986
1987	Lovers of Time; Koibitotachino jikoku (恋人たちの時刻 サントラ): Released: 5 March 1987
1987	Robot Carnival: Released: 21 March 1987
1987	The Drifting Classroom (漂流教室 オリジナルサントラ): Released: 21 July 1987
1988	My Neighbor Totoro (となりのトトロ): Released: 25 March 1988
1988	Night City (シングル): Released: 21 August 1988
1988	Winter Travelers (冬の旅人): Released: 21 December 1988
1988	Venus Wars: Released: 10 April 1988
1989	Kiki's Delivery Service (魔女の宅急便): Released: 25 August 1989
1989	The Inners (はるかなる時間の 彼方へ): Released: 21 April 1989
1990	Tasmania Story (タスマニア物語): Released: 21 July 1990; Format: CD
1991	Chizuko's Younger Sister: Released: 21 April 1991
1991	Kojika Monogatari: Released: 21 April 1991; Format: CD
1991	A Scene at the Sea: Released: 19 October 1991
1991	天外魔境２ MARU: Released: 1 February 1992
1992	君だけをみていた: Released: 4 March 1992
1992	Porco Rosso (紅の豚): Released: 22 July 1992
1992	B+1: Released: 21 October 1992
1992	A Scene at the Sea: Released: 25 November 1992
1992	Seisyun Den-Deke-Deke-Deke: Released: 25 November 1992
1993	Haruka Nostalgy: Released: 21 January 1993
1993	Sonatine: Released: 9 June 1993; Label: Eastworld / Toshiba EMI
1993	The Water Traveler, Samurai Kids: Released: 1993.08.04
1994	Birth: Released: 1994.03.24
1994	さすがの猿飛: Released: 1994.03.24
1994	Joe's Project (ぴあの): Released: 1994.06.01
1994	Joe's Project 2 (ぴあの / 純名里沙): Released: 1994.08.10
1996	Kids Return: Released: 1996.06.26
1997	Princess Mononoke (もののけ姫): Released: 2 July 1997
1997	Parasite Eve: Released: 1997.02.01
1998	Hana-bi: Released: 1998.01.01
1998	Tree of Early Winter Rains (時雨の記): Released: 1998.10.31
1999	Universe Within I: Human Body I & II: Released: 1999.04.28
1999	Universe Within II: Brain & Mind I & II: Released: 1999.04.28
1999	Universe Within III: Gene I & II: Released: 1999.04.28
1999	Kikujiro: Released: 1999.05.26
2000	First Love (Hatsu-koi): Released: 2000.03.28
2000	Alpenrose: Released: 26 April 2000
2000	As the River Flows: Released: 2000.04.29
2001	Brother: Released: 2001.01.17
2001	Spirited Away (千と千尋の神隠し): Released: 18 July 2001
2001	Quartet: Released: 2001.09.27
2001	Little Tom Thumb (Le Petit Poucet): Released: 2001.10.15
2002	Dolls: Released: 2002.10.02
2002	Kaze no Bon (の風盆から): Released: 2002.11.23
2002	When the Last Sword Is Drawn: Released: 2002.12.26
2004	Le Mécano de la General: Released: 2004.09.06
2005	Welcome to Dongmakgol (웰컴 투 동막골): Released: 2005.08.04
2004	Howl's Moving Castle (ハウルの動く城): Released: 19 November 2004
2005	Yamato: Released: 2005.12.14
2005	A Chinese Tall Story (情癫大圣): Released: 2005.12.19
2007	The Sun Also Rises: Released: 2007.09.19
2007	Tae Wang Sa Shin Gi (태왕 사 신기): Released: 2007.09.11
2007	A Tale of Mari and Three Puppies (マリと子犬の物語): Released: 2007.12.08
2008	Ponyo on the Cliff by the Sea (崖の上のポニョ): Released: 16 July 2008; Label: Tokuma Japan Communications; Format: CD, Digital
2008	Departures: Released: 2008.09.10
2008	I'd Rather Be A Shellfish (Watashi Wa Kai Ni Naritai): Released: 2008.11.19
2008	Sunny Et L'Elephant: Released: 2008.12.04
2009	The Postmodern Life of My Aunt: Released: 2009.07.09
2009	NHK TV Series "A Cloud on the Slope (Saka no Ue no Kumo)": Released: 2009.11.18
2009	Oruru No Mori No Monogatari (A Tale of Ululu's Wonderful Forest): Released: 2009.12.16
2010	The 19th Step: Released: 2010
2010	Ocean Heaven (Gui Lunmei): Released: 2010
2010	Villain: Released: 2010.09.01
2010	NHK TV Series "A Cloud on the Slope (Saka no Ue no Kumo)": Released: 2010.11.17
2011	Mr. Dough and the Egg Princess: Released: 2011.02.02
2011	Ni no Kuni: Dominion of the Dark Djinn: Released: 9 February 2011
2011	NHK TV Series "A Cloud on the Slope (Saka no Ue no Kumo)": Released: 9 November 2011
2012	NHK TV Series "A Cloud on the Slope (Saka no Ue no Kumo)": Released: 22 February 2012
2012	Tenchi: The Samurai Astronomer: Released: 12 September 2012
2013	Tokyo Family: Released: 16 January 2013; Label: Universal Sigma; Format: CD
2013	Ni no Kuni: Wrath of the White Witch: Released: 29 March 2013
2013	Onna Nobunaga: Released: 3 April 2013
2013	NHK Shinkai Project – Giant Deep Sea Creatures: Released: 26 June 2013
2013	Kiseki No Ringo: Released: 15 July 2013
2013	The Wind Rises (風立ちぬ): Released: 17 July 2013
2013	Sweet Heart Chocolate: Released: 1 November 2013
2013	The Tale of the Princess Kaguya (かぐや姫の物語): Released: 20 November 2013
2014	The Little House: Released: 22 January 2014; Label: Universal Japan; Format: CD, Digital
2015	Deep Ocean: Released: 1 January 2015
2018	Ni no Kuni II: Revenant Kingdom: Released: 23 March 2018
2019	Children of the Sea Released: May 19, 2019
2019	NiNoKuni: Released: 23 August 2019
2021	Soul Snatcher: Released: 19 February 2021; Label: Universal Sigma
2023	The Boy and the Heron: Released: 14 July 2023
2025	A Big Bold Beautiful Journey: Released: 19 September 2025

== Other album appearances ==
Year	Album	Artist	Details
1986	Soil (未来の記憶)	Syoko	Co-producer

== Published scores ==
(released by Zen-On Music Company Ltd.)

Album	Release date	Notes
Orchestra Stories: Tonari no TOTORO (Original Edition)	23 Oct 2002	
ENCORE (Original Edition)	6 Mar 2002	
A String Quartet: "QUARTET"		For string quintet
Asian X.T.C. (Original Edition)		
FREEDOM (Original Edition)		
Piano Stories		
Etude - A Wish to the Moon		
Ghibli Best Stories		
Piano Stories Best '88-'08		
Piano Stories Vol2 "The Wind of Life"		
Vermeer & Escher*		Orchestra work with choir
Minima_Rhythm*		Orchestra work with choir
Melodyphony*		Orchestra work with choir
The East Land Symphony		Orchestra work with soprano soloist
Spirited Away Suite	Mar 2020	Orchestra work
Symphonic Suite "Kiki's Delivery Service"	Apr 2021	Orchestra work
Contrabass Concerto	Jul 2021	Orchestra work with contrabass soloist
The Border Concerto for 3 Horns and Orchestra	Jul 2021	Orchestra work with three horn soloists
Symphony No. 2	2021	Orchestra work
World Dreams Suite	Apr 2022	Orchestra work

- Published by Schott Music Tokyo.

== Unpublished scores ==
There are numerous television and cinema, soundtracks created by Joe Hisaishi that were never released for sale, such as.

- TV Scores
  - First Human Giatrus (1974–1976)
  - Robokko Beeton (1976–1977)
  - Tonde Mon Pe (1982–1983)
  - Sasuga no Sarutobi (1982–1984)
  - Galactic Whirlwind Sasuraiger (1983–1984)
  - Genesis Climber Mospeada (1983–1984)
  - Twin Hawks (1984–1985)
  - Honoo no Alpen Rose: Judy & Randy (1985–1986)
- Movie, OVA, Special Scores
  - Mr. Glory Giant's Squad 3 (1981) (with Takeo Watanabe)
  - Two Down Full Base (1982)
  - Techno Police 21C (1982)
  - The Wizard of Oz (1982)
  - Genesis Climber Mospeada: Love, Live, Alive (1985)
  - Ōke no Monshō (1988)
- Video Game Scores
  - Zoids: Battle of the Central Continent (1987)
  - Zoids 2: Zenbase Strikes Back (1989)
  - Tengai Makyō II: Manjimaru (1992) (with Yasuhiko Fukuda)
- Soundtrack Works
  - Mahō Shōjo Lalabel (1980–1981)
  - Voltron (1981–1982)
  - Hello! Sandybell (1981–1982)
  - Meiken Jolie (1981–1982)
  - Mobile Suit Gundam: The Movie Trilogy (1981–1982) (did music arrangements and additional music to Soldiers of Sorrow and Encounters in Space)
  - Ai Shite Knight (1983–1984)
  - Creamy Mami, the Magic Angel: Curtain Call (1986)
  - Kimagure Orange Road: The Movie (1988)
