= Dread Empire's Fall =

Science fiction novel series by Walter Jon Williams

Dread Empire's Fall is a space opera novel series, written since 2002 by the American author Walter Jon Williams.

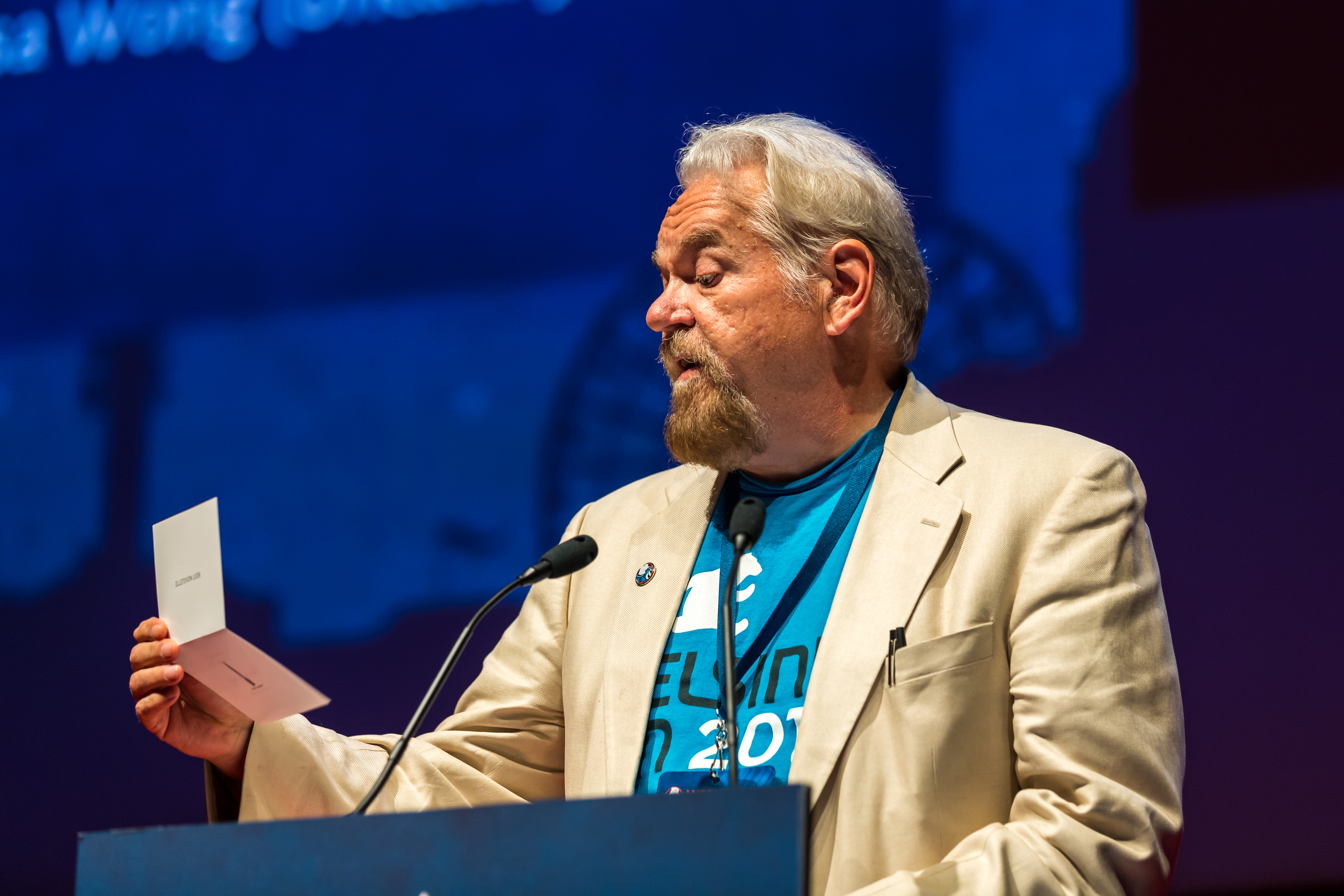
Walter Jon Williams at the Hugo Award Ceremony 2017, Worldcon in Helsinki

== Setting and synopsis ==
The Dread Empire's Fall series is set in a future in which the powerful Shaa species thousands of years ago conquered several other intelligent species, including humanity; imposing on them their inflexible set of laws known as "the Praxis". When the last living Shaa dies, the species they conquered first, the Naxids, attempts to appoint itself rulers of the former Shaa empire. A civil war erupts when the other species resist them, including the protagonists, Terran (human) naval officers Caroline Sula and Gareth Martinez. Since the Shaa empire stopped expanding long ago and its military was largely occupied by training and suppressing the occasional mutiny or revolt, its strategic and tactical doctrines have become matters of rigid, unchanging tradition. To stop the Naxids, the other species must practice innovation and creativity, something the Shaa attempted to stamp out long ago.

== Reception ==
At Tor.com, Jo Walton appreciated the trilogy consisting of the first three novels as very well-made, "funny and clever" conventional examples of their genre: "There’s a war, in which the characters get to do clever things and get promoted. If you like military SF you’ll like it."

== Books ==
The first three novels form a trilogy, two subsequent books are stand-alone, and the last three form another trilogy.

- The Dread Empire's Fall trilogy:

- The Praxis (2002), ISBN 0-7434-2897-8
- The Sundering (2003), ISBN 0-7434-2898-6
- Conventions of War (2005), ISBN 0-7432-5677-8

- Standalone novellas:

- "Investments" (2005)
- Impersonations (2016), ISBN 978-0-7653-8781-3

- Second trilogy:

- The Accidental War (2018), ISBN 978-0-0624-6702-7
- Fleet Elements (2020), ISBN 0-0624-6704-2
- Imperium Restored (2022), ISBN 978-0-0624-6705-8
