= Promotions and Prizes =

Tabletop role-playing game supplement

Promotions and Prizes is a 1979 role-playing game supplement published by Erisian Games.

== Contents ==
Promotions and Prizes is a supplement in which rules are provided for character generation and personal combat, and a system for character improvement is provided using promotion and gaining money through prizes.

== Publication history ==
Promotions and Prizes was written by Jon Williams, and was published by Erisian Games in 1979 as a digest-sized 76-page book with one sheet of charts.

Shannon Appelcline noted that aside from Bushido and Aftermath!, "FGU's other major pickup of the early '80s was Tradition of Victory, an 'Age of Sail' wargame that had an associated swashbuckling RPG, Promotions and Prizes. FGU reprinted these as Heart of Oak (1982) and Privateers and Gentlemen (1983), but would only support them with a few supplements."

== Reception ==
Dave Arneson and Steve Perrin reviewed Promotions and Prizes for Different Worlds magazine and stated that "Friends who have read these rules and have done more research than I have tend to comment about what has been left out [...] Still, I can consider the rules worthwhile simply because of these essays."
