= Tales from the Forlorn Hope =

Tales from the Forlorn Hope is a 1991 role-playing adventure for Cyberpunk published by R. Talsorian Games.

== Plot summary ==
Tales from the Forlorn Hope is an adventure in which eight adventure scenarios are included.

== Reception ==
Donnie Collette reviewed Tales from the Forlorn Hope in White Wolf #39 (1994), rating it a 4 out of 5 and stated that "While most adventure books are of limited use, providing plots that can only be used once, Tales from the Forlorn Hope serves to introduce a setting that most Cyberpunk GMs should find useful throughout their campaign. I've paid [more money] for books this size that were far less useful."

== Reviews ==
- Abyss Quarterly #50
- Challenge (Issue 66)
