= Corporation Report 2020 =

1991 table top role playing game supplement

- Publisher: R. Talsorian Games
- Publication date: 1991

Corporation Report 2020 is a 1991 role-playing supplement for Cyberpunk published by R. Talsorian Games.

== Contents ==
Corporation Report 2020 is a series of three supplements to the Cyberpunk tabletop role-playing game in which two powerful corporations are detailed in each.

== Reception ==
Donnie Collette reviewed Corporation Report 2020, Vols 1–3 in White Wolf #39 (1994), rating it a 3 out of 5 and stated that "[The price] isn't bad for an RPG sourcebook, but I can't see why you would need to spend [that much] on all three. Simply put, they're not that different from each other."

== Reviews ==
- Challenge #62 (July, 1992)
- Windgeflüster (Issue 27 - Oct 1994)
- Casus Belli #69
