= Data Screen 2.0.2.0. =

Data Screen 2.0.2.0. is a 1990 role-playing supplement for Cyberpunk 2020 published by R. Talsorian Games.

== Contents ==
Data Screen 2.0.2.0. is a supplement in which a gamemaster's screen includes a 32-page adventure. The screen is organized with tables and lists covering useful information such as weapons, armor, netrunning programs, task and combat modifiers. The adventure is particularly beneficial for inexperienced Cyberpunk GMs due to its well-organized structure, making it easier to run even with unexpected player actions. Pregenerated player characters come with detailed backgrounds, showcasing the strong character background generation system of Cyberpunk. The adventure provides valuable advice for handling various situations, such as when characters split up so they can search for information. Additionally, it includes a list of errata related to the Cyberpunk 2020 rulebook.

== Reception ==
Don Collette reviewed Data Screen 2.0.2.0. in White Wolf #28 (Aug./Sept., 1991), rating it a 3 out of 5 and stated that "Any Cynerpunk 2.0.2.0. GM is probably going to want the Data Screen, and even with the omissions, it should still prove quite useful."

== Reviews ==
- Challenge #53 (Oct., 1991)
