= Drake Maijstral =

Science fiction character

Drake Maijstral is the fictional protagonist of a series of science fiction novels by Walter Jon Williams. He appears in The Crown Jewels (1987), House of Shards (1988), and Rock of Ages (1995) (collected as Ten Points for Style by the Science Fiction Book Club).

SF Site described the Maijstral books as a comedy of manners, and compared Maijstral to Steven Brust's "Vlad Taltos", while Sharon Lee compared him to Alexei Panshin's "Anthony Villiers".

In the novels, Maijstral is a minor aristocrat in a galactic empire that has long since conquered and assimilated humanity, and an "Allowed Burglar". Centuries prior to the novels' setting, the alien emperor was a kleptomaniac, and – since nothing the Emperor did could be wrong – "Allowed Burglary" was invented as an extreme sport.
