= The Rift (Williams novel) =

1999 novel by Walter Jon Williams

- First edition (publ. HarperPrism); Cover art by John Berkey
- Author: Walter Jon Williams
- Language: English
- Genre: Science fiction
- Publisher: HarperPrism
- Publication date: 1999
- Publication place: United States
- Media type: Print (hardcover and paperback)

The Rift is a 1999 science fiction novel by American writer Walter Jon Williams. It concerns the effects of a massive earthquake in the US states of Missouri, Mississippi, and Louisiana. Largely using the 1811-12 New Madrid earthquake as a base, it depicts the breakdown of infrastructure that would result if an earthquake of equal magnitude were to occur today.

The title of the novel is a double-entendre. It is a reference to the theory that the New Madrid quake was the result of a failed "rifting" of North America, but also to the deep racial and social divides that are portrayed throughout the story.

== Plot ==
The novel primarily follows the story of a white teenager and an African-American man on their journey down the devastated Mississippi River.

Although the focus of the novel is the journey of the two main characters, there are dozens of side-stories and parallel plot lines throughout the book. Some of which are: a preacher who leads his flock to believe that the end has come, a Sheriff (and KKK member) who begins a program of genocide against the people left homeless by the disaster, a technician struggling to keep a Louisiana nuclear power plant from melting down, and an Army Corps of Engineers commander trying to curtail the devastation wrought by the failure of the levee system.

The author also plays on actual historical events and personalities such as Huey Long, the uprising at the Sobibor concentration camp, and the Jonestown incident.

== Sources ==
- Williams, Walter J. The Rift. New York, New York: HarperPrism, 1999.
