= City of Night (disambiguation) =

City of Night is a 1963 novel by John Rechy.

City of Night may also refer to:

- City of Night (Koontz and Gorman novel), a 2005 novel by Dean Koontz and Ed Gorman

== Songs ==
- "City of Night", by Bruce Springsteen from The Promise, 2010
- "City of Night", by Phixx from Electrophonic Revolution, 2004
- "City of Night", by Pink Martini from Hey Eugene!, 2010
- "City of Night", by Rational Youth from Cold War Night Life, 1982
- "City of Night (Berlin)", by Peter Schilling from The Different Story (World of Lust and Crime), 1989

== See also ==
- 715 Harrison, a San Francisco nightclub popularly known as City Nights
- City of Endless Night, a 2018 novel by Douglas Preston and Lincoln Child
- Cities of the Red Night, a 1981 novel by William S. Burroughs
- "The City of Dreadful Night", a 1870s poem by James B.V. Thomson
- City Nights, a 1978 album by Nick Gilder
- Night and the City (disambiguation)
- Night in the city (disambiguation)
- Night city (disambiguation)
