= Hardwired: The Sourcebook =

1989 supplement by R. Talsorian Games

Cover art by Luis Royo, 1986

Hardwired: The Sourcebook is a supplement published by R. Talsorian Games in 1989 for the dystopian near-future science fiction role-playing game Cyberpunk.

== Contents ==
This supplement is set in the year 2151 using the background of the Walter Jon Williams novel Hardwired. The Earth has become a dystopian world where most heavy industry and the social elite are in orbit, the Orbital Corporations control the world, and the United States has balkanized into a myriad of regions. Smugglers exist at the fringes of society, using neural implants to increase their chances of survival while they look for an opportunity to permanently move into orbit.

This supplement provides

- a background of the world
- a slang lexicon
- new character classes, including pirate, private investigator, and new variants for cops and netrunners.
- rules for cyberpsychosis
- 19 new skills
- new technology
- various world currencies and benchmark prices
- drugs that enhance neural implants
- an alternate combat system
- an alternate netrunning system
- several adventure hooks

Six linked scenarios are included.

== Publication history ==
In 1986, Walter Jon Williams joined the growing cyberpunk subgenre of science fiction with his novel Hardwired. Two years later, Williams helped Mike Pondsmith of R. Talsorian Games to playtest a new role-playing game, Cyberpunk. In 1989, Williams wrote Hardwired: The Sourcebook, a Cyberpunk supplement based on his novel with contributions by Mike Pondsmith and Pati Nagle. The 94-page softcover book features interior art by Matthew Anacleto, Harrison Fong, Sam Liu, Karl Martin, and T. K. Scott, and cover art by Luis Royo.

== Reception ==
In the October–November 1989 edition of Space Gamer (Vol. II No. 2), the reviewer commented that "If you're a Hardwired fan, this book is definitely worthwhile; it's a good springboard into Hardwired role-playing. And even for those who don't wish to use Williams' universe, the book is a good resource and idea bin. The rules, charts and background are sure to improve your Cyberpunk game."

In the February 1990 edition of Dragon (Issue #154), Ken Rolston commented that this supplement "is true to the novel's tone and style [...] all to good effect." He concluded with a recommendation, saying, "A compelling and expressive evocation of a cyberpunk campaign setting, Hardwired is good reading, and the adventures are first class."

Stephan Wieck reviewed Hardwired Sourcebook in White Wolf #21 (June/July 1990), rating it a 5 out of 5 and stated that "The sourcebook is entertaining to read, especially the adventure. It also contains enough game specifics to make it a useful product. While reading/reviewing the product, I looked for aspects of the sourcebook that warranted constructive criticism and I couldn't find anything that was not done well. The only downer is the [...] price tag which seems a bit steep, but Walter Jon Williams' writing is worth the money."

== Other reviews ==
- Casus Belli #53
