= Night and the City (disambiguation) =

Night and the City is a 1950 British film directed by Jules Dassin.

Night and the City may also refer to:

- Night and the City (1992 film), an American remake of the 1950 film, by Irwin Winkler
- Night and the City (album), a 1996 album by Charlie Haden and Kenny Barron
- Night and the City (novel), a 1938 novel by Gerald Kersh
- "Night and the City" (The Batman), a 2005 television episode

== See also ==
- Night in the city (disambiguation)
- City of Night (disambiguation)
- Night city (disambiguation)
