= Solip:System =

1989 cyberpunk science fiction novelette by Walter Jon Williams

- First (limited) edition
- Author: Walter Jon Williams
- Cover artist: Donna Gordon
- Language: English
- Genre: Science fiction
- Publisher: Axolotl Press
- Publication date: 1989
- Publication place: United States
- Media type: Print (hardback & paperback)
- OCLC: 21899365

"Solip:System" is a 1989 cyberpunk science fiction novelette by American writer Walter Jon Williams.

"Solip:System" begins shortly before the ending of Hardwired (1986) and continues beyond that point. The author wrote this book as a link between Hardwired and Voice of the Whirlwind (1987). The main character is the computer personality Reno, a minor character in Hardwired.
