= Piano Stories III =

Nostalgia, Piano Stories III

Studio album by Joe Hisaishi
- Released: 1998-10-14
- Genre: Classic, Soundtrack
- Length: 43:08
- Label: Polydor

Nostalgia, Piano Stories III (or Piano Stories III briefly) is an album by Japanese composer Joe Hisaishi originally released on October 14, 1998, in Japan. It is the third of his collection "Piano Stories" where he gathers his successes in the Japanese cinematographic industry through his partnership with Hayao Miyazaki but also original compositions.

== Track listing ==
All songs were written by Joe Hisaishi, except "Taiyou ga Ippai," which is a rendition of Nino Rota's score to "Purple Noon", and "Babylon no Oka", which is a rendition of French composer Camille Saint-Saëns' opera "Samson and Delilah."

No.	Title	Length
1.	"Nostalgia"	3:34
2.	"Journey (旅情 - Ryojou)"	3:48
3.	"Cinema Nostalgia"	6:10
4.	"Il Porco Rosso"	4:53
5.	"Casanova"	4:19
6.	"Full of Sunshine (太陽がいっぱい - Taiyou ga Ippai)"	3:27
7.	"Hana-Bi"	3:37
8.	"Nocturne"	4:12
9.	"Hill of Babylon (バビロンの丘 - Babylon no Oka)"	4:00
10.	"La Pioggia"	5:15
