= The Arasaka Brainworm =

Tabletop role-playing game adventure

The Arasaka Brainworm is an adventure published by Atlas Games in 1991 for the dystopian science fiction role-playing game Cyberpunk 2020.

== Publication history ==
The Arasaka Brainworm was the first in a series of adventures that Atlas Games published under license for R. Talsorian Games's role-playing game Cyberpunk 2020. John Nephew, the founder of Atlas Games, later stated that these adventures had better sales than most d20 System books years later at the peak of d20 popularity.

== Description ==
The characters are tasked with recovering something from a closely guarded biotech facility on a remote Pacific atoll. Although the characters have been provided with information such as maps of the facility and security patrol schedules, they discover that they have been misled, leading to unforeseen complications.

== Reception ==
In Issue 60 of Challenge, Craig Sheeley found the adventure "well-organized and competently documented," but warned that "brains count for more than brawn," giving "the less combat-oriented character types a chance to shine." Sheeley criticized the interior art as "a bit ugly", and found some mistakes in the pre-generated characters' abilities. Nevertheless he concluded, "But on the whole, a good adventure."

In the September 1992 edition of Dragon, (Issue 185), Allen Varney found the adventure to be boringly predictable, saying "You've seen it all 50 times before. Sorry, was I yawning? I didn't mean to be rude."
