= Greenwar =

Role-playing game

Cover art by C. Brent Ferguson, 1994

Greenwar is an adventure published under license by Atlas Games in 1994 for R. Talsorian Games's near-future dystopian role-playing game Cyberpunk 2020.

== Plot summary ==
Greenwar is an adventure in which the player characters are operatives working for the Browning Investment Group, and are tasked with attempting to perform a hostile takeover of Liverpool Shipping. The players are not allowed to use violence; instead, they have been provided with a fixed amount of cash to buy at least 50% of the shares in Liverpool, and must seek out potential sellers, using negotiation, strategy or intimidation. A game mechanic calculates the effect the players' actions have on the share prices of Liverpool, which may make their task easier or more difficult.

== Publication history ==
R. Talsorian Games first published the role-playing game Cyberpunk in 1988, re-releasing a revised version, Cyberpunk 2020 in 1990. Thomas Kane of Atlas Games designed a Cyberpunk 2020 adventure titled Greenwar, with illustrations by Doug Schuler and C. Brent Ferguson, and cover art by Ferguson. Atlas published it under license in 1994.

== Reviews ==
In the November 1994 edition of Dragon (Issue #211), Rick Swan complimented the lack of combat in this adventure, commenting that "Players more interested in muscles than minds should keep their distance; this is high IQ territory." Although he noted that the lack of combat might sound a bit boring, "[designer] Kane's flair for the dramatic keeps it as tense as a castle siege." Swan concluded by giving Greenwar an excellent rating of 5 out of 6, saying, "Greenwar will put hack-n-slashers to sleep. [It extends] the parameters of cyberpunk with off-beat premises [...] [It downplays] high tech mumbo-jumbo in favour of imaginative casts and encounters."
