= Night in the city =

Night in the city may refer to:

- Night in the City (Chinese: 城市之夜), 1933 Chinese silent film
- "Night in the City", a Joni Mitchell song from the 1968 album Song to a Seagull
- "Night in the City", an Electric Light Orchestra song from the 1977 album Out of the Blue
- "A Night in the City", a song from the 1982 album Dvadeset Godina by the band Piloti (band)
- "Night in the City", a 2000 single by P.M. Dawn

== See also ==
- One Night in One City, a 2007 Czech horror film
- "Last Night in the City", a song by Duran Duran from the 2015 album Paper Gods
- "One Night in the City", a song by Dio off the 1984 album The Last in Line
- Night and the City (disambiguation)
- City of night (disambiguation)
- Night city (disambiguation)
- Night (disambiguation)
- City (disambiguation)
