= Dark City =

Dark City may refer to:

== Film ==
- Dark City (1950 film), an American film noir
- Dark City (1990 film), a British-Canadian crime drama
- Dark City (1998 film), an American-Australian neo-noir science fiction film

== Music ==
- "Dark City", a song by Electric Light Orchestra from Eldorado, 1974
- "Dark City", a song by Iced Earth from Dystopia, 2011
- "Dark City", a song by Machinae Supremacy from Overworld, 2008

== See also ==
- Dark City: The Cleaner, a 2024 New Zealand TV crime drama
- The City Dark, a 2011 American documentary film
- Night city (disambiguation)
