= Night City Stories =

Night City Stories is a 1992 role-playing game adventure published by Atlas Games for Cyberpunk.

== Plot summary ==
Night City Stories is an adventure in which a quartet of adventures—playable alone or as a linked campaign—follows four gritty Night City stories.

== Reviews ==
- Envoyer
- Abyss Quarterly #50 (Winter, 1992)
- The Last Province (Issue 1 - Oct 1992)
