= Blackhand's Street Weapons 2020 =

Tabletop role-playing game supplement

Blackhand's Street Weapons 2020 is a supplement published by R. Talsorian Games in 1994 for the dystopian near-future role-playing game Cyberpunk.

== Contents ==
Blackhand's Street Weapons 2020 is a compilation of over 250 weapons for Cyberpunk 2020.

== Reception ==
In the August 1996 edition of Dragon (Issue #232), Rick Swan commented that "trigger-happy Cyberpunk-ers should find this a useful resource, if only for the comprehensive statistics and ammunition rules."

== Reviews ==
- Australian Realms #26
