= 715 Harrison =

Nightclub in San Francisco, California

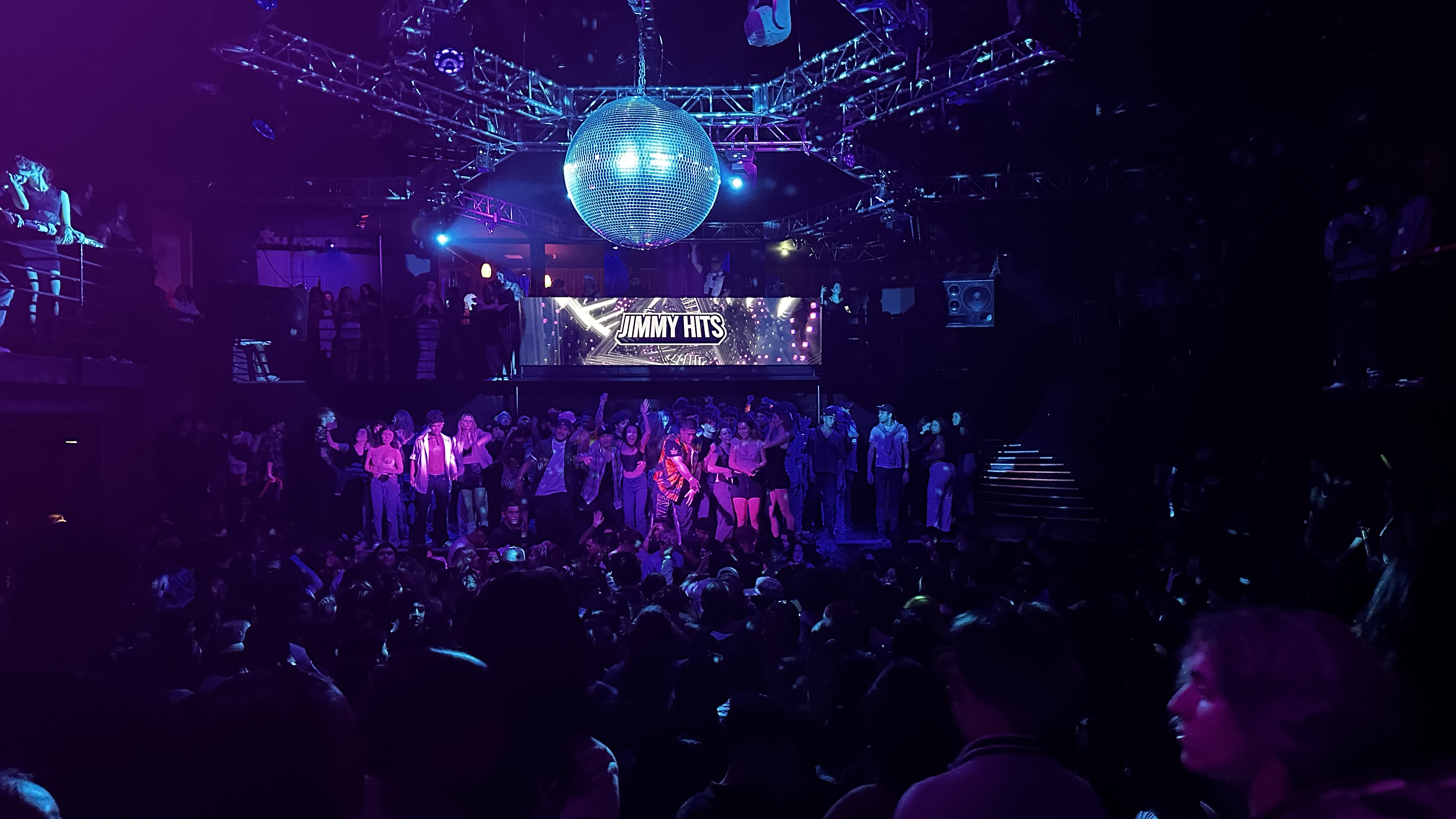
- 715 Harrison's main room in 2023
- Interactive map of the 715 Harrison area
- Former names: City Nights, Club X (see § Shows and offerings)

General information
- Location: 715 Harrison Street, San Francisco, California, United States
- Coordinates: 37°46′55.6″N 122°23′51.4″W
- Opened: September 11, 1985

Technical details
- Floor count: 2

Other information
- Number of units: 3
- Number of bars: 3
- Public transit access: 12 Folsom Pacific; Powell Street; Powell Street; Yerba Buena/Moscone

Website
- sfclubs.com

715 Harrison is a nightclub venue located in the SoMa neighborhood of San Francisco, California, known mostly for hosting Club X since 1989 and previously City Nights from 1985 to 2020. The club is designated by San Francisco as a legacy business and is one of the few venues in the Bay Area consistently open to guests above 18 years of age, rather than 21.

== History ==
City Nights first opened on September 11, 1985, and was started by Brit Hahn, then a 25-year-old San Francisco native. The club from its founding until 2023 was owned and operated by SFClubs, Inc., itself by Hahn and Ray Bobbitt, the longtime manager of operations at the club. The property where City Nights first opened, located at 715 Harrison Street, was originally a gay bar known as "Dreamland", as well as hosting the Harrison Street Theater, until it was acquired by Hahn; he credits Oasis, a local gay bar, for inspiring his interest to open up City Nights. On its first night of business, City Nights hosted Tower of Power as its stage act. Bobbitt joined club management in 1989.

715 Harrison was one of the few venues which did not fall victim to San Francisco's high entertainment-venue turnover rate. At one point, the venue's Club Faith was the only 18+ club targeted towards LGBT+ populations in the Bay Area.

According to the venue's management, 715 Harrison has entertained over six million people as of 2020. The club closed throughout the major stages of the COVID-19 pandemic. Club X officially announced its reopening in September 2021, with its first night after quarantine being the 25th of that month.

== Venue location and structure ==
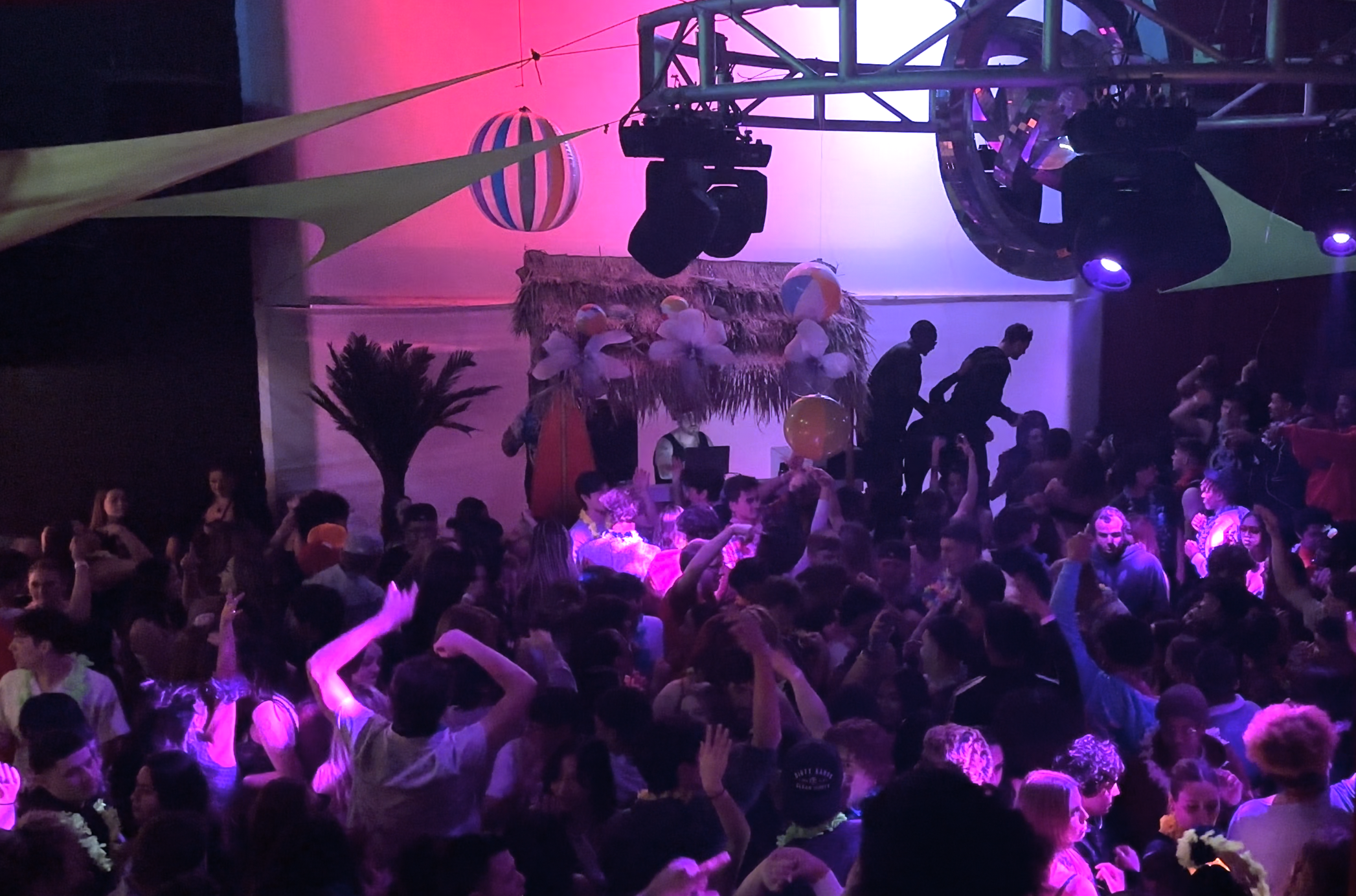
715 Harrison's front room in 2023

715 Harrison is on Harrison Street near the intersection of Third Street. The venue is a large concrete building and is noted as having formerly been the location of the Goat Hill Pizza warehouse. The total size of the venue is 25,000 square feet, though promotional material in 2023 released by the club describes the venue as having 15,000 ft^{2} (1,400 m^{2}).

The property is located within walking distance of Moscone Center and is accessible by Muni bus line 12 through a stop across the street and Muni Metro's T Third via Yerba Buena/Moscone station.

Spanning 25,000 ft^{2} (2,300 m^{2}), the building itself also contains a pizza parlor, formerly operated by Escape from New York Pizza (no relation to the Portland chain of the same name) and offices on the upper level. Both have entrances to such respective areas on street level. At one point, the offices of Live105 were across the street at 730 Harrison.

Upon entering the venue, the first room which patrons enter is a large room and dance floor with a bar at the farthest end. Stationed on top off the bar is a section of lounges and round booths set up as VIP lounges; these are further accessible by a flight of stairs to the left end. Near this left end is a miniature stage and stairs which with a hallway lead into the venue's main room. A large stage with a wide LED video wall dominates the main room hovering over a large pit. Both rooms are equipped with fog machines.

== Shows and offerings ==
=== City Nights ===
City Nights is the oldest, most popular, and most widely-known weekly event that has been hosted at the club. The venue has operated City Nights since its 1985 opening up until the COVID-19 pandemic. The club branded itself as a hip-hop and Top 40 hits club and operated every Saturday night from 9:30 pm to 2:00 am. City Nights' attendees are advised to expect a very large young crowd due to the general lack of clubs in San Francisco open to people under 21; City Nights additionally credits itself as being the only 18+ Top 40 and hip-hop club in San Francisco. Despite this, City Nights operated a full bar for all guests over the age of 21.

=== Club X ===
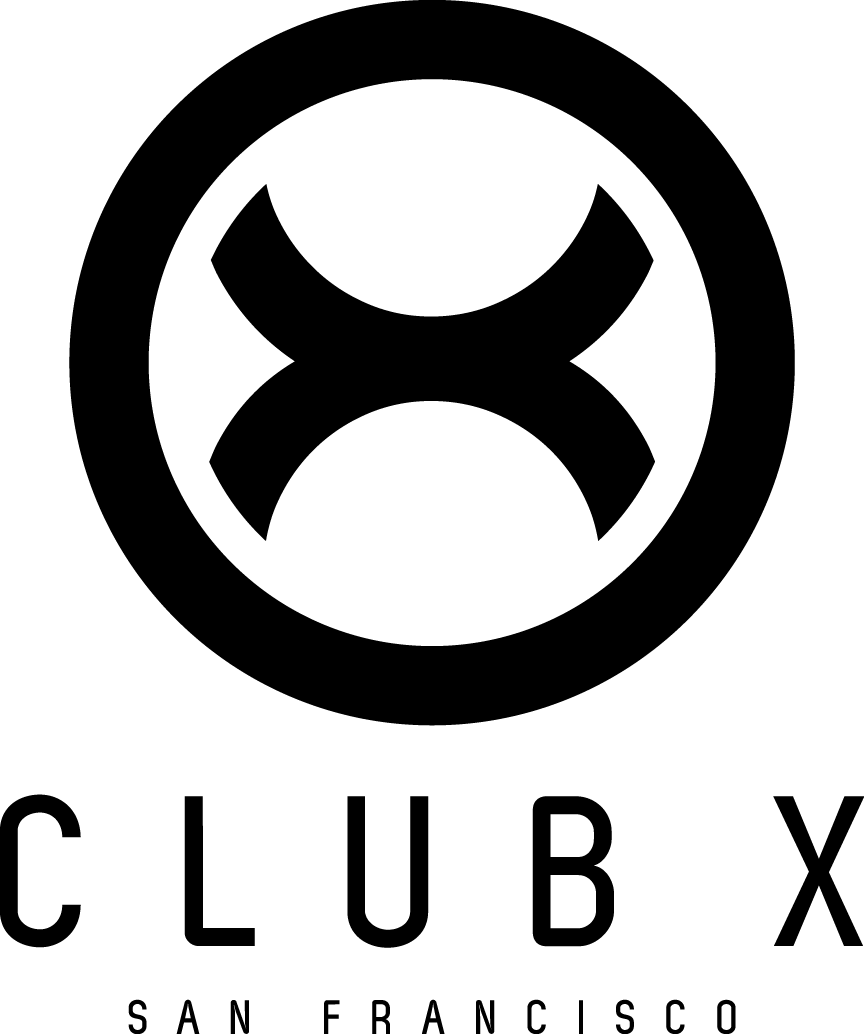
Club X's logo

An older logo for Club X

Club X is the second weekly event created by the club, and the oldest one which is still running. The event was first created in 1989, and the name "Club X" was coined as a way to note the large audience of university students from across the Bay Area. Until the pandemic, Club X ran every Friday, and though it originally concentrated on hosting alternative rock and similar live performances, starting in 1996, it has advertised itself as having a heavier focus on "alternative" EDM, especially house and dubstep music.

=== LGBT events ===
Hahn and Bobbitt additionally operated several targeted towards LGBT audiences. These were most often held on Thursdays and went under numerous names, including "Dreamland", "Faith" (sometimes referred to as "Club Faith"), "Time", "The Crib", and "The Box". According to Bobbitt, the venue has hosted LGBT-targeted events for a combined 26 years.

=== Other events ===
On Tuesdays, 715 Harrison hosted "Roderick's Chamber" and "The Go-Go", events themed around and targeted towards the Goth subculture. These events lasted for a combined 16 years per Bobbitt. During the late 1990s, Roderick's Chamber in particular was considered among the top Goth-targeted nightlife events in Northern California, and especially favorited by fashion-focused members of the subculture.

Starting in 2023, 715 Harrison began to host "Ritmo Latino", a new Friday event which featured cumbia, reggaeton, bachata and dembow.

== Incidents ==
715 Harrison has been the location of occasional anti-LGBT+ motivated incidents, as well as assaults committed by intoxicated people. The club was also the site of a kidnapping which ultimately led up to a robbery and murder in 2008.

In 2018, City Nights became one of the many targets of threats made by a terrorist allegedly supporting the Islamic State. The ISIS supporter, named Amer Alhaggagi, suggested hitting nightclubs and other popular places in San Francisco and while suggesting that all San Francisco nightclubs were crowded, City Nights was the club which the news reported Alhaggagi planned to bomb.

== Legacy and reception ==
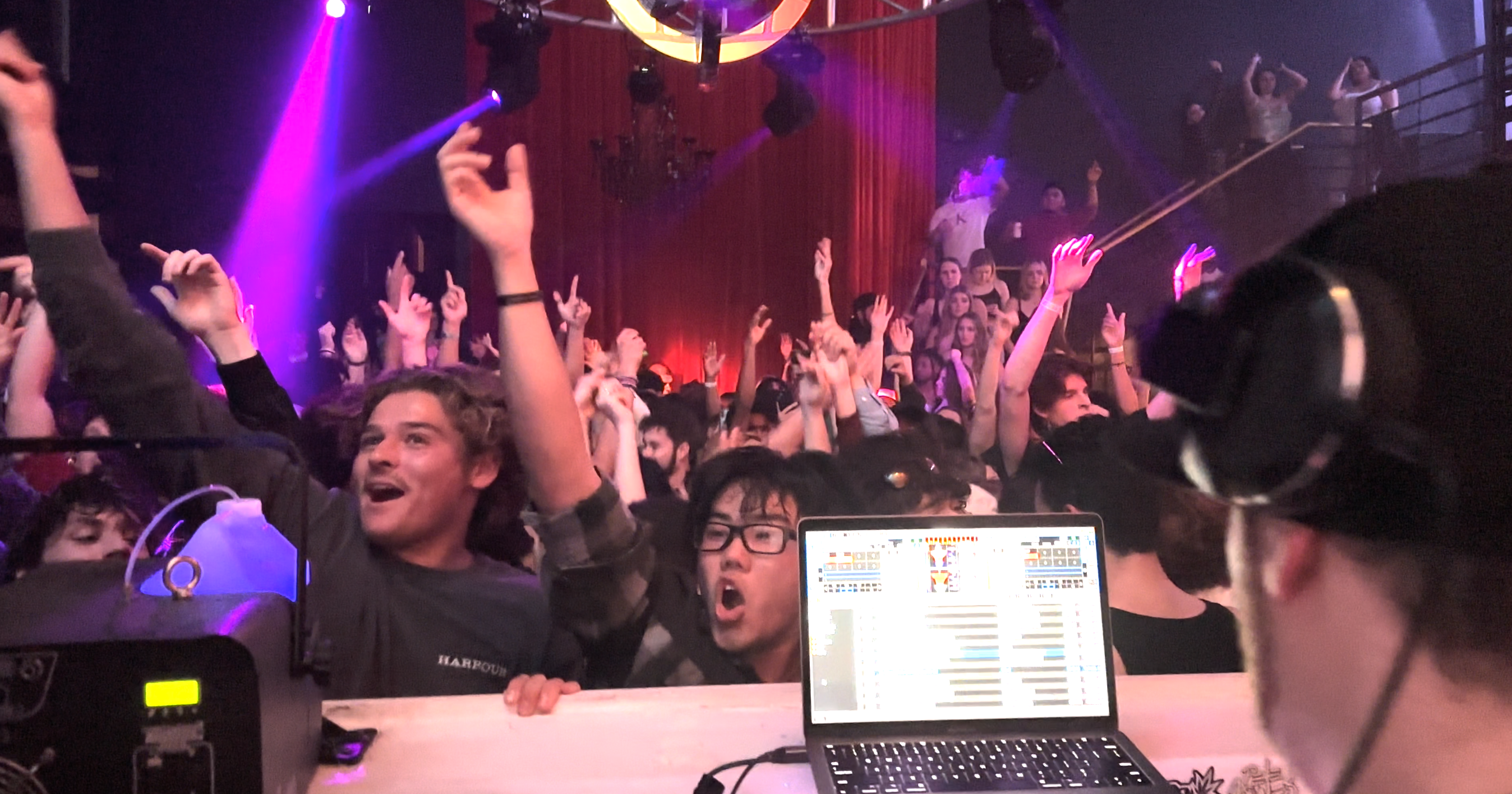
A local DJ performing at 715 Harrison's front room

City Nights and Club X are well known by locals as a club which people "love to hate" and as a club which people no longer attend after turning 21. Kamaiyah, a Bay Area native, has described City Nights and Club X as a "rite of passage" for all who grow up or go to college in the Bay Area, a description shared by Time Out journalist Ivy McNally. Similarly, journalist Dianne de Guzman from SFGATE has noted that the events the venue host are "timeless" with regard to the energy from the youth that 715 Harrison hosts. Guzman further notes that despite returning attendees experiencing nostalgia after marking their 21st birthday many people tend to refute and hate on the club once they turn 21.

The design of the facility has no consistent theme and contains a large LED screen, stripper poles, large DJ booths, go-go cages, lasers, "decent" lighting, and sofas. Spoken of as a venue which looks more for utility as opposed to elegance, the poles are also described as being designed for inexperienced audiences. The venue has also been criticized for having overly-crowded lines and dance floors at times, and has been reported on for being the location of men dancing with women without asking.

=== Notable performers ===
- Afrojack
- Awich
- Justin Bieber
- BoomBox
- Joe Boxer
- Jason Derulo
- Grace Jones
- Kalush
- Koven
- Lady Gaga
- Martin Jensen
- MC Hammer
- Sage the Gemini
- SOB X RBE
