= Eurosource Plus =

Eurosource Plus is a supplement published by R. Talsorian Games in 1995 for the near-future dystopian role-playing game Cyberpunk.

== Contents ==
Eurosource Plus, a 144-page book designed by Jose Ramos, Florian Merx and Steve Gill, explains Europe and its culture in the Cyberpunk universe, where Europe is a single bloc run by large corporations.

The book is divided into eight sections:

1. Fortress Europe (how to enter Europe, legally or illegally; border police)
2. Who Runs Europe? (The Euro Council, government structure; Interpol; various commissions)
3. The Major Powers
4. The South
5. New Central Europe
6. The Margins
7. Class and Eurostyle (social classes, cyberpunk style, everyday life, income, transportation, laws)
8. The Roles in Europe (how various Cyberpunk classes can be used in Europe)

== Reception ==
In the March 1996 edition of Arcane (Issue 4), Andy Butcher was unimpressed, giving it a poor rating of only 5 out of 10 and saying, "Eurosource Plus is packed with information and detail, but in a form that's a real effort to trawl through. If you can force yourself, you will find nearly all the stuff you need to effectively play adventures in Europe or characters that were brought up there. The Euros may represent the pinnacle of style in Cyberpunk, but this book represents a low point in the style of the game."

In the November 1996 issue of Dragon (Issue 235), Rick Swan called it "A good, not great, supplement for the Cyberpunk game." Swan felt the 144-page book was overly ambitious for its relatively short length, and should have focussed on one or two countries, not twenty: "It's hard to cover the economy, politics, and geography of Italy in less than three pages. Spain and Bulgaria get about two pages each. Portugal gets about one." He concluded, "A narrower focus would have allowed the designers more room to breathe. Next time, instead of another Eurosource, how about something along the lines of Portugalsource?"

== Reviews ==
- Australian Realms #30
