= Rache Bartmoss' Brainware Blowout =

Rache Bartmoss' Brainware Blowout is a 1996 role-playing game supplement published by R. Talsorian Games for Cyberpunk.

== Contents ==
Rache Bartmoss' Brainware Blowout is a supplement in which netrunner characters are supported with gear, rules, and new mechanics—all compiled in one volume. Hosted by Rache Bartmoss, the supplement merges his commentary with gameplay enhancements. Brainware Blowout incorporates material from the Netrunner CCG, adds design and construction rules for cyberdecks, introduces a Mini Frame computer system, and expands on personal computing's role in the world. The software section includes program rules drawn from core books and Chromebook entries. The supplement includes a ten-page index and streamlined gear references.

== Reception ==
Jim Swallow reviewed Rache Bartmoss' Brainware Blowout for Arcane magazine, rating it an 8 out of 10 overall, and stated that "Despite the repeated material, Brainware Blowout is a must for any Cyberpunk 2020 referee with a netrunner character in his group, and the card listings make it both a useful resource for players of the Netrunner CCG and a perfect bridge between the card game and the roleplaying system."

== Reviews ==
- Casus Belli #102
