= Rache Bartmoss' Guide to the Net =

Tabletop role-playing game supplement

Rache Bartmoss' Guide to the Net is a 1993 role-playing game supplement published by R. Talsorian Games for Cyberpunk.

== Contents ==
Rache Bartmoss' Guide to the Net is a compilation of background information, including names, locations and secrets discovered by hacker Rache Bartmoss.

== Reception ==
Steve Jackson reviewed Rache Bartmoss' Guide to the Net in Pyramid #6 (March, 1994), and stated that "If you're doing netrunning in a dark-future world, with the Cyberpunk 2020 rules or any other, get this book. Especially at the price. Forgive them their four-color sins and their bad proofreading... this time... and enjoy Rache."

== Reviews ==
- Dragon #212
- PC Actual 128
- Rollespilsmagasinet Fønix (Danish) (Issue 1 - March/April 1994)
- Australian Realms #16
