= Night City (Cyberpunk 2020) =

1991 role-playing game supplement

- Series: Cyberpunk 2020
- Publisher: R. Talsorian Games
- Publication date: 1991

Night City is a 1991 role-playing supplement for Cyberpunk 2020 published by R. Talsorian Games.

== Contents ==
Night City is a supplement in which the city setting of Night City is detailed in the same manner as the Dataterms located throughout the city.

== Reception ==
Don Collette reviewed Night City in White Wolf #30 (Feb., 1992), rating it a 3 out of 5 and stated that "Night City is most useful for background and atmosphere, and GMs running a Cyberpunk campaign in any urban setting ought to find it useful enough, but don't expect a complete ready-to-run setting. A GM still has plenty of work on his hands in developing a Night City campaign."

== Reviews ==
- Challenge #58
- Dragon #185
- Windgeflüster (Issue 27 - Oct 1994)
- GamesMaster International (Issue 5 - Dec 1990)
- Portal (Issue 7 - Oct 2000)
- Casus Belli (Issue 69 - May 1992)
- Polyhedron #75
