= Hardwired (novel) =

1986 cyberpunk science fiction novel by Walter Jon Williams

HardWired
- First edition
- Author: Walter Jon Williams
- Cover artist: Luis Royo
- Language: English
- Genre: Science fiction (cyberpunk)
- Publisher: Night Shade Books
- Publication date: 1986
- Publication place: United States
- Media type: Print (Hardcover & Paperback)
- ISBN: 978-1-59780-062-4
- OCLC: 77500827

Hardwired is a 1986 cyberpunk science fiction novel by American writer Walter Jon Williams.

It was nominated for the 1987 Locus Award. Williams stated that the novel Damnation Alley, by Roger Zelazny, was an inspiration for his book.

== Plot summary ==
The Orbital Corporations won the Rock War, and now they control the world.

Ex-pilot Cowboy, "hardwired" via skull sockets directly to his lethal electronic hardware, teams up with Sarah, an equally cyborgized gun-for-hire, to make a last stab at independence. Cowboy is hired by a Russian named Arkady to transport contraband medicine across "The Line" while Sarah takes an assassination job for an Orbital agent named Cunningham. Both of them find themselves betrayed by their employers and soon are forced into hiding. The two form an uneasy alliance, both romantic and professional, as they fight the Orbitals to survive.

== Editions ==
A 30th Anniversary Edition was published in 2011 with noticeable edits and changes to the text of the book.

== Series ==
HardWired is part of a series which includes:

- Hardwired (1986)
- Voice of the Whirlwind (1987)
- Solip:System (1989)

== In other media ==
R. Talsorian Games, with Williams's assistance, published Hardwired: The Sourcebook for their Cyberpunk role-playing game, which further expanded many of the concepts and the world setting of the novel. Williams had a previous relationship with creator Mike Pondsmith and R. Talsorian Games, playtesting the original Cyberpunk game system.
