= Walter Jon Williams =

American fiction writer (born 1953)

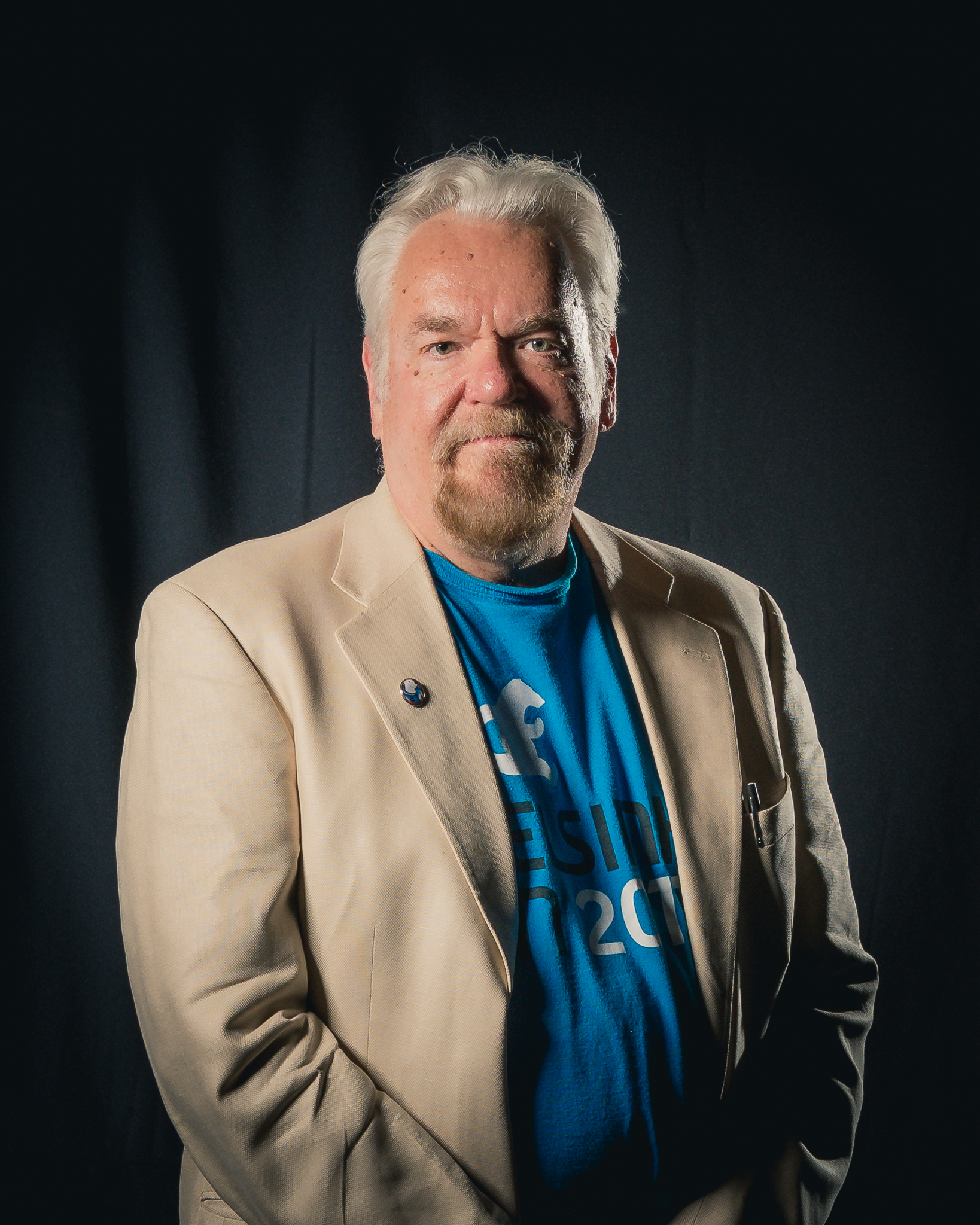
- Walter Jon Williams in 2017
- Born: October 28, 1953 (age 73); Duluth, Minnesota, U.S.
- Education: University of New Mexico (BA)
- Occupation: Writer
- Writing career
- Period: 1981–present
- Genres: Science fiction Nautical fiction (as Jon Williams)
- Notable awards: Nebula Award
- Website: walterjonwilliams.net

Walter Jon Williams (born October 28, 1953) is an American writer, primarily of science fiction. Previously he wrote nautical adventure fiction under the name Jon Williams, in particular, Privateers and Gentlemen (1981–1984), a series of historical novels set during the Age of Sail.

== Career ==
Writing as Jon Williams, he designed the war game Tradition of Victory and role-playing game Promotions and Prizes, which were republished by Fantasy Games Unlimited as Heart of Oak (1982) and Privateers and Gentlemen (1983). A role-playing game sourcebook for Cyberpunk called Hardwired (1989) was licensed by R. Talsorian Games, based on the 1986 novel of the same name by Williams.

== Bibliography ==
=== Novels ===
- Hardwired series
  - Hardwired (1986)
  - Solip:System (1989), novelette released as a standalone book
  - Voice of the Whirlwind (1987)
  - "Wolf Time" (1987), novelette
- Drake Maijstral series
  An SF comedy of manners series about the aristocratic burglar Drake Maijstral. Collected as an omnibus, Ten Points for Style (1995)
  - The Crown Jewels (1987)
  - House of Shards (1988)
  - Rock of Ages (1995)
- Metropolitan series
  - Metropolitan (1995), Nebula Award nominee
  - City on Fire (1997), Hugo Award nominee; Nebula Award nominee
- Dread Empire's Fall series
  A military science fiction/space opera series.
  - The Praxis (2002)
  - The Sundering (2003)
  - Conventions of War (2005)
  - Investments (2008), novella
  - Impersonations (2016)
  - The Accidental War (2018)
  - Fleet Elements (2020)
  - Imperium Restored (2022)
- Privateers and Gentlemen series, as Jon Williams
  - To Glory Arise, originally The Privateer (1981)
  - The Tern Schooner, originally The Yankee (1981)
  - Brig of War, originally The Raider (1981)
  - The Macedonian (1981)
  - Cat Island (1981)
- Dagmar Shaw series
  A sci-fi thriller series involving crowdsourcing and alternate reality games.
  - This Is Not a Game (2009)
  - Deep State (2011)
  - The Fourth Wall (2012)
  - "Diamonds from Tequila" (2014), short story published in Rogues
- Quillifer series
  - Quillifer (2017)
  - Quillifer The Knight (2019)
  - Lord Quillifer (2022)
- Other novels
  - Ambassador of Progress (1984)
  - Knight Moves (1985), Philip K. Dick Award nominee
  - Angel Station (1989)
  - Elegy for Angels and Dogs (1990)
  - Days of Atonement (1991)
  - Aristoi (1992)
  - The Rift (1999), as by Walter J. Williams
  - The New Jedi Order: Destiny's Way (2002)
  - Implied Spaces (2008)

=== Short fiction ===
Collections

- Facets (1990)
- Frankensteins and Foreign Devils (1998)
- The Green Leopard Plague and Other Stories (Trade Hardcover: Night Shade Books, 2010, ISBN 978-1-59780-177-5)

Stories

Title	Year	First published	Reprinted/collected	Notes
The Tang Dynasty underwater pyramid	2004	Sci Fiction (Aug 4, 2004)		Novelette

- "Dinosaurs" (1987), Hugo Award nominee
- "Witness" (1987), Nebula Award nominee
- "Surfacing" (1988), Hugo Award and Nebula Award nominee
- "Prayers on the Wind" (1991), Nebula Award nominee
- "Wall, Stone, Craft" (1993), Hugo Award and Nebula Award nominee
- "Red Elvis" (1994) (collected in Mike Resnick's alternate history anthology Alternate Outlaws)
- "Foreign Devils" in War of the Worlds: Global Dispatches (1996), Sidewise Award for Alternate History winner
- "Lethe" (1999), Nebula Award nominee
- "Daddy's World" (2000), Nebula Award winner
- "Argonautica" (2001), Nebula Award nominee
- "The Last Ride of German Freddie", in Worlds That Weren't (2002), Sidewise Award for Alternate History nominee
- "The Green Leopard Plague" (2004), Nebula Award winner, Hugo Award nominee
