= Heart of Oak: Naval Miniatures for the Age of Fighting Sail =

Wargame

Heart of Oak: Naval Miniatures for the Age of Fighting Sail is a 1978 board game published by Fantasy Games Unlimited, with a second edition published in 1983.

== Gameplay ==
Heart of Oak: Naval Miniatures for the Age of Fighting Sail is a set of naval wargaming rules for the Age of Sail, from the years 1755–1815.

== Reception ==
Dave Arneson and Steve Perrin reviewed Heart of Oak for Different Worlds magazine and stated that "All in all, the combat is basically reasonable, but the ship afire and boarding rules are poor, and games will turn into short, bloody flaming encounters, over too soon to make use of the maneuvering possible through use of the good sailing rules."

John Miller reviewed Heart of Oak: Naval Miniatures for the Age of Fighting Sail in Space Gamer No. 71. Miller commented that "Heart of Oak can be recommended to those gamers who want to adventure in a universe that, although familiar from our history books, is also as exciting, heroic, and deadly as any fantasy universe ever imagined."
