= Challenge (game magazine) =

Game magazine

Challenge was a role-playing game magazine published by Game Designers' Workshop (GDW) between 1986 and 1996.

== Publication history ==
In 1984, Game Designers' Workshop's original magazine Journal of the Travellers Aid Society (JTAS) ended with Issue 24, but there had already been an announcement in Issue 22 that a new and as yet unnamed magazine would replace it. The new magazine would feature a larger format (8.5"×11") to allow for printing of things such as deck plans or sector maps that would not fit in the smaller JTAS format. It would also add coverage of GDW's new release Twilight 2000 and other GDW games.

The new bimonthly periodical, Challenge, appeared in 1986; to maintain continuity for the Traveller fans (and JTAS subscribers), the first issue was numbered Issue 25, rather than starting again with Issue 1. Also to maintain continuity, Challenge featured a separate section labeled "Journal of the Travellers' Aid Society", which covered Traveller exclusively; this special section lasted through Issue 28. After that issue, Traveller articles continued to appear, but the magazine was more frequently dominated by articles of other GDW gaming systems, including Twilight 2000, 2300 AD, and Space 1889.

In Issue 30, the magazine expanded to 64 pages. In Issue 35 (1988), under new editor Michelle Sturgeon, the magazine expanded to cover the entire genre of science fiction role-playing games rather than focusing solely on GDW games, including Shadowrun by FASA and Paranoia by West End Games.

In Issue 39 (1989), the magazine featured "The Hinterworlds," detailing of a sector in Imperium space for MegaTraveller; in subsequent issues, MegaTraveller articles were featured prominently.

In 1991, starting with Issue 51, the magazine became a monthly periodical, but in 1993, the magazine dropped back to bimonthly with Issue 68. The following year, only four issues were published. The magazine ended publication in 1995 with Issue 77. In 1996, the demise of GDW brought any future publication to an end.

Between 1986 and 1995, fifty-three issues of Challenge were published.

== Reception ==
In the January 1989 edition of Dragon (Issue #141), Jim Bambra called the magazine "an excellent source of adventures, ideas, and hardware for GDW's Twilight 2000, 2300 A.D., and MegaTraveller role-playing games, but many of its other features are also easily converted to other game systems."

In the October 1990 edition of Dragon (Issue #162), Allen Varney approved of the expanded vision of the magazine to cover all science-fiction games, not just those produced by GDW. Varney commented, "There's no challenge in learning to like this solid periodical."
