= Duelist's Handbook =

- Publication date: 1996
- ISBN: 1896776957

Duelist's Handbook is a 1996 role-playing game supplement published by Dream Pod 9 for Heavy Gear.

== Contents ==
Duelist's Handbook is a supplement in which gladiatorial mech combat on the planet Terra Nova is drawn from the Heavy Gear Fighter card game. Duels—often deadly—are an accepted method for resolving disputes, and this supplement expands on the lore and mechanics surrounding these ritualized battles. The handbook adds to Terra Nova's dueling culture, profiling various types of duellists from rigid military professionals to flamboyant celebrity combatants. It offers campaign material: detailed NPCs, new maps, and a fully fleshed-out junk-city in the Badlands. It also showcases notable pilots and their combat Gears, along with a suite of dueling weaponry—think chainsaws, spike cannons, and lances. The book includes revised skirmish-scale rules for mecha combat.

== Publication history ==
Shannon Appelcline noted that "The tactical system from the second edition Heavy Gear rulebook was re-released standalone as the Heavy Gear Tactical Combat Boxed Set (1998) and then later supplemented by a series of non-RPG 'Tac Packs'. Meanwhile, Dream Pod 9 was also producing rules for smaller-scale tactical combat in the Duelist's Handbook (1996, 2000). Furthering the more combative side of the game, Dream Pod 9 ended their license with RAFM and began producing Heavy Gear miniatures in house in 1999."

== Reception ==
Jim Swallow reviewed Duelist's Handbook for Arcane magazine, rating it a 6 out of 10 overall, and stated that "Because of the small-scale focus of duel gameplay, extra rules are provided to run Gear fights on a 'skirmish' scale. While these pages appeared in a similar form in the Life on Terra Nova supplement, their reprinting here is a sensible move, and unlike some other game companies, Dream Pod 9 doesn't try to force you into buying Heavy Gear Fighter. This is certainly a good place to begin a Heavy Gear game."

== Reviews ==
- Valkyrie #15 (1997)
- Backstab #30
