= Gear Krieg =

Tabletop role-playing game

- Cover of the first edition

Gear Krieg is an alternate history game setting published by Dream Pod 9. It contains information suitable for role-playing and wargaming a pulp-fueled World War II, featuring walking tanks and epic tabletop battles.

== Setting ==
Gear Krieg is an alternate history take on World War II, where the technology curve is a little more steep than in our own reality. Technology, such as personal jet packs, rocket fighters, and walking tanks, are developed during the course of the war, sometimes massively changing events and famous battles.

From the game's rulebook: "The world would indeed have been a different place had the Roaring Twenties not delivered the wonders promised by visionaries. Instead, war walkers now stride across the battlefield of Europe, huge supertanks thunder over North Africa, rocket fighters duel high above the Pacific, adventurers and superspies battle the Nazi forces in the shadows and scientists work feverishly in their laboratories to perfect the next doomsday weapon for their masters. Powered by advanced science, will the darkness of fascism spread across the world, or can brave men and women prevent it?"

== Rules ==
Gear Krieg is based on the Silhouette game engine, a streamlined set of rules that is already described in Heavy Gear, Dream Pod 9's other science fiction game. It can be played as either a role-playing game (RPG), a tactical wargame, or an hybrid integration of both.

Both the RPG and miniature games are built on the same basic rule mechanics. Silhouette is a realistic, simulationist system that defines characters in terms of ten base attributes (agility, knowledge, etc.), 5 derived attributes (health, etc.), and a variety of skills. Skill rolls make up the backbone of the system, which focuses on effect-based speed of play over grainy detail. The core mechanic involves rolling a number of 6-sided dice, taking the highest result and comparing it to a set threshold number. If the result is higher than the threshold the test is a success; if it is lower the test is a failure. The margin by which the test succeeded (Margin of Success, MoS) or failed (Margin of Failure, MoF) helps to determine the final outcome. Combat is handled by the same system, with characters taking penalty-inflicting wounds rather than depleting a set number of health points. As a result, the system can be lethal, especially on inexperienced characters. To keep the proper pulp high-action atmosphere, the game includes rules that allow players to twist the odds in their favor, in keeping with the conventions of the adventure genre.

== Publication history ==
Just as its support for the first edition of Tribe 8 was coming to an end, Dream Pod 9 released their fourth role-playing game, Gear Krieg (2001), set during an alternate-history World War II with advanced technology with technological anachronisms such as walking tanks. As with the company's earlier game Heavy Gear, Gear Krieg could be played as a role-playing game or a tactical game. The Silhouette CORE Rulebook (2003), also known as the "SilCORE" book, introduced a standalone version of Silhouette remaking it as a generic system with optional rules to convert d20 to Silhouette; this release immediately preceded the Mecha Companion (2003), which included d20 stats for mecha from Heavy Gear, Jovian Chronicles and Gear Krieg using the d20 Mecha (2003) rules from Guardians of Order. The SilCORE book gave Dream Pod 9 the chance to republish their older games using dual d20 and Silhouette statistics, and the next year Jovian Chronicles second edition (2003), Gear Krieg second edition (2003), Heavy Gear third edition (2003), Tribe 8 second edition (2004) and the brand new CORE Command (2003) were all released this way.

== Reviews ==
- Knights of the Dinner Table Magazine #49 (Nov., 2000)
- Pyramid
- Pyramid
- Backstab #32
- Backstab #45

== See also ==
- Gear Krieg Wargaming Companion
