= CORE Command =

Tabletop role-playing game

Cover of the CORE Command Player's Handbook as of 2006

CORE Command is a science fiction role-playing game published by Dream Pod 9 since 2003. It introduces a far future space opera universe for role-playing, featuring advanced science, gigantic spacecraft and epic space battles.

== Setting ==
Across the galaxies, sentient races are being awakened to defend their existence against an encroaching evil that menaces the entire space-time continuum. Brave heroes must step forward to protect reality, else the universe itself may crumble into nothingness.

CORE Command taps into the legends and archetypes that power the fantasy myths, with technology so powerful as to be virtually indistinguishable from magic. Its wide-open, galactic-scale setting is intended to put player characters at the center of the action, not on the sidelines, while still providing a common story backbone.

== System ==
CORE Command is based on the Silhouette game engine, a streamlined set of rules first described in Heavy Gear and Jovian Chronicles, Dream Pod 9's other science fiction games. The Silhouette rules used in CORE Command are sold separately as a book titled Silhouette CORE Rulebook.

Silhouette is a simulationist system that defines characters in terms of 10 base attributes (agility, knowledge, etc.), 5 derived attributes (health, etc.), and a variety of skills. Skill rolls make up the backbone of the system, which focuses on effect-based speed of play over grainy detail. The core mechanic involves rolling a number of 6-sided dice, taking the highest result and comparing it to a set threshold number. If the result is higher than the threshold the test is a success; if it is lower the test is a failure. The margin by which the test succeeded (Margin of Success, MoS) or failed (Margin of Failure, MoF) helps to determine the outcome. Combat is handled by the same system, with characters taking penalty-inflicting wounds rather than depleting a set number of health points. As a result, the system can be lethal, especially on inexperienced characters.

CORE Command and its supplements were dual-statted as SilCORE for both Silouette and d20 gaming. The latter were not as complete or accurate as the native SilCORE stats, however.

== Reviews ==
- Pyramid
