= Jovian Chronicles Mechanical Catalog =

Role-playing game supplement

Jovian Chronicles Mechanical Catalog, subtitled "Exo-Armors & Spacecraft", is a supplement published by Dream Pod 9 in 1997 for the science fiction mecha role-playing game Jovian Chronicles that details various spaceships.

== Contents ==
Jovian Chronicles Mechanical Catalog is a supplement containing details of numerous space vehicles, including missile cruisers, escort carriers, space stations, and cargo haulers, each one illustrated and presenting diagrams and blueprints.

== Publication history ==
Dream Pod 9 published the Jovian Chronicles role-playing game in 1997, and immediately published the Mechanical Catalog, a 136-page softcover book designed by Philippe Boulle, Tyler Millson-Taylor, Marc A. Vezina, with interior art by Ghislain Barbe, Normand Bilodeau, and Bobbi Burquel, and cover art by Ghislain Barbe.

== Reception ==
In Issue 244 of Dragon (February 1998), Rick Swan called this book "a nuts-and-bolts nirvana" aimed "at players more interested in hardware than human beings." He concluded by giving it an above average rating of 5 out of 6, saying, "With its striking graphics, sharp text and meticulous blueprints, the Mechanical Catalog rivals the best of FASA's BattleTech Technical Readouts series.
