= Lightning Strikes =

Lightning Strikes may refer to:

- Lightning strike, an electric discharge between the atmosphere and the ground

== Film and television ==
- "Lightning Strikes", an episode of Beavis and Butt-Head
- Lightning Strikes (film), a 2009 American-Bulgarian science fiction horror film produced by Phillip J. Roth
- Lightning Strike, a 2012 Italian comedy film

== Music ==
- Lightning Strikes (band), an American heavy metal band

=== Albums ===
- Lightnin' Strikes (Vee-Jay album), 1962
- Lightnin' Strikes (Verve Folkways album), 1966
- Lightning Strikes (Loudness album), 1986
- Lightning Strikes (Aceyalone album), 2007

=== Songs ===
- "Lightnin' Strikes", a 1965 song by Lou Christie
- "Lightning Strikes, a 1981 song by Klaus Nomi
- "Lightning Strikes" (Aerosmith song), 1982
- "The Lightning Strike", a 2008 song by Snow Patrol
- "Lightning Strikes", a song by The Smashing Pumpkins from the 2009–14 album Teargarden by Kaleidyscope
- "Lightning Strikes", a song by Yes from the 1999 album The Ladder

== Other ==
- Lightning Strike (game), a 1999 miniatures wargame
