= Heavy Gear Technical Manual =

Heavy Gear Technical Manual is a 1996 role-playing game supplement published by Dream Pod 9 for Heavy Gear.

== Contents ==
Heavy Gear Technical Manual is a supplement in which both background-rich lore and detailed mechanical rules are offered. The book was originally compiled from overflow material cut from other supplements. About two-thirds of the content consists of rules-free tech files, which analyze components of Heavy Gear mecha and explore Terra Nova's broader technological landscape—including medicine, military innovations, and advanced war machinery. The remaining portion attempts to streamline the game's math-heavy vehicle design system, offering expanded tools like Perks and Flaws, comprehensive ammunition rules, and mechanics for repair, modification, and cybernetic implants. New skills and NPC profiles round out the package.

== Reception ==
Jim Swallow reviewed Heavy Gear Technical Manual (as "Terranovan Technology") for Arcane magazine, rating it a 6 out of 10 overall, and stated that "Terranovan Technology is modular, and therefore a ref without it won't be left behind in future. The supplement's best strength is probably as a referee aid - it's much easier to explain to a player how he took a APFSDS round in the knee actuator by pointing it out on a blueprint."

== Reviews ==
- Valkyrie #15 (1997)
