= Southern Vehicles Compendium One: Gears & Striders =

Southern Vehicles Compendium One: Gears & Striders is a 1997 role-playing game supplement published by Dream Pod 9 for Heavy Gear.

== Contents ==
Southern Vehicles Compendium One: Gears & Striders is a supplement in which an exhaustive catalog is provided of the mecha—Heavy Gears and Striders—used by Terra Nova's Southern faction. This volumes builds on the earlier Vehicle Field Guide, replacing its integrated statistic sheets with a separate supplement and offering a more comprehensive view of the Southern mechanical arsenal. The compendium begins with a historical overview, detailing the evolution of iconic Gear units—the Jager for the South—before diving into a meticulous examination of every base model and its variants. The book also profiles Gear manufacturers and prototype mecha in development, reiterates weapon rules and character options, and includes stats and maps for military bases.

== Reception ==
Jim Swallow reviewed Southern Vehicles Compendium One: Gears & Striders for Arcane magazine, rating it a 6 out of 10 overall, and stated that "In all, the Gears & Striders supplements are useful, if slightly dull products; a pronouncement that seems indicative of the more recent Heavy Gear releases. The roleplaying and adventure potential of Terra Nova and the Heavy Gear universe is becoming stagnated under waves of dense text. A return to the more dynamic feel of the earlier books is required, or else the system will merely become a number-crunching wargame with an overdone background."
