= Northern Record Sheets One =

Northern Record Sheets One is a 1997 role-playing game supplement published by Dream Pod 9 for Heavy Gear.

== Contents ==
Northern Record Sheets One is a supplement in which statistics blocks are provided for each mech featured in the Northern Vehicles Compendium, totaling over a hundred units. The sheets are usable for photocopying, adhering to the game's standard format.

== Reception ==
Jim Swallow reviewed Northern Record Sheets One for Arcane magazine, rating it a 4 out of 10 overall, and stated that "In all, the Gears & Striders supplements are useful, if slightly dull products; a pronouncement that seems indicative of the more recent Heavy Gear releases. The roleplaying and adventure potential of Terra Nova and the Heavy Gear universe is becoming stagnated under waves of dense text. A return to the more dynamic feel of the earlier books is required, or else the system will merely become a number-crunching wargame with an overdone background."
