= Northern Vehicles Compendium One: Gears & Striders =

Northern Vehicles Compendium One: Gears & Striders is a 1996 role-playing game supplement published by Dream Pod 9 for Heavy Gear.

== Contents ==
Northern Vehicles Compendium One: Gears & Striders is a supplement in which a comprehensive catalog of Terra Nova’s Northern Heavy Gears and Striders is presented, covering their history, variants, manufacturers, prototype developments, weapon and character rules, and supporting military‑base statistics and maps.

== Reception ==
Jim Swallow reviewed Northern Vehicles Compendium One: Gears & Striders for Arcane magazine, rating it a 6 out of 10 overall, and stated that "In all, the Gears & Striders supplements are useful, if slightly dull products; a pronouncement that seems indicative of the more recent Heavy Gear releases. The roleplaying and adventure potential of Terra Nova and the Heavy Gear universe is becoming stagnated under waves of dense text. A return to the more dynamic feel of the earlier books is required, or else the system will merely become a number-crunching wargame with an overdone background."
