= Mecha Press =

North American anime and manga magazine

Mecha Press is a North American anime and manga magazine that was published by IANVS Publications in the early 1990s.

The magazine was released on a roughly bimonthly schedule, with 5 to 6 issues per year. Each issue usually focused on one particular anime or manga, dedicating up to one third of its page content on related synopsis, character and mecha presentations.

== The magazine ==
Mecha Press was originally started as a sister magazine to Protoculture Addicts, the oldest anime and manga magazine in North America. Its name derives from its main focus, mecha, although the content also covered characters, stories, toys, games and scale models. The publisher of Mecha Press was Ianus Publications.

The first issue, a red duo-tone test called issue #0, was published in 1991. Issue #1 officially launched the magazine the next year. Issues #1 through 6 had an oversized format similar to a tabloid newspaper. From issue #7 and onward, the magazine was shrunk to a more standard size, but gained a color section.

When the design team, Dream Pod 9, started focusing exclusively on games, the magazine was cancelled with issue #17. It appeared in March–April 1995. The remaining unpublished content was then merged into Protoculture Addicts magazine. Archive issues are available as PDF e-books from the publisher.

== Detailed content ==
Starting with #2, each issue has one main topic and several derivative ones. The following abbreviations are used in the listing to save space: Basics of Mecha Modeling - BoMM; Battletech - Btech; Engineering Outlook - EO; Heavy Gear - HG; Heavy Gear Fighter - HGF; Jovian Chronicles - JC; Mobile Suit - MS; Mekton II - MkII; Questions & Answers - Q&A.

- MECHA PRESS #0: prototype issue, duo-tone, oversized. MS Gundam, Introduction to Mecha Gaming, EO: Space Flight, Votoms and Gunbuster Overview, Patlabor Models Review and more. Primarily a collector's item.
- MECHA PRESS #1: Reprint of prototype issue w/color cover and large format (9.25" x 12").
- MECHA PRESS #2, Patlabor: MkII Alternate Construction Rules (pre-MTS), Introduction to Mecha!, EO: Actuator Systems, Gundam F-91 Models Review, Madox-01 Review and more.
- MECHA PRESS #3, Gundam 0080 War in the Pocket: MkII Alternate Construction Rules (pre-MTS), The Game of the Gods (Mecha!), Solaris VII (Btech), Votoms Overview Part II, Heavy Metal L-Gaim Models Review and more.
- MECHA PRESS #4, Bubblegum Crisis: Gundam 0080 Synopsis Part II, Mekton 3D Rules, Mecha! Optional Construction Rules, Optional Autocannon/Missile Rules (Btech), Dominion Overview, Scopedog Model Conversion and more.
- MECHA PRESS #5, Gundam F-91: Gundam 0080 Synopsis part III, EO: Structural Materials, MkII Alternate Construction Rules (pre-MTS), The No-Space Weapon (Mecha! scenario), Mecha! Models Review, Introduction to Garage Kits and more.
- MECHA PRESS #6, Five Star Stories: Mamoru Nagano's Previous Works, Framed! (MkII scenario), Mecha! Optional Construction Rules part II, Modeling Bits'n Tricks, How to Build the XM-06 Daghis-Iris and more.
- MECHA PRESS #7, The Super Dimension Fortress Macross II: Lovers, Again: History of the Valkyrie Fighter, Modeling Color Section, Mekton Miniatures Review, Battletech Japanese Edition Overview, The Mecha Invasion Campaign, Combat! Preview and more. First issue of new format (8.125" x 10.5").
- MECHA PRESS #8, Gundam 0083: Modeling Color Section, GP-02A Color Poster, History of the Gundam, Victory Gundam Preview, Mekton: Closer to Japanimation, Official Mecha! Armor Rules and more.
- MECHA PRESS #9, Spaceship Special: Captain Harlock, Space Cruiser Yamato, MS Gundam, Gundam 0083 Synopsis Part II, Modeling Color Section, RGM-79N Color Poster, Starship Games Overview, Combat! Technology Briefing and more.
- MECHA PRESS #10, Aura Battler Dunbine: Detailing Neck Units, Gundam 0083 Synopsis part III, Miniatures Review, Korean Models Kits, Jovian Chronicles Preview, Battletech Shield Rules, Mobile Suit Mekton, Mecha! 2nd Edition Playtest Rules and more.
- MECHA PRESS #11, Combat Armor Dougram: Madcat Model Overview, Gundam 0083 Synopsis Part IV, Rebel Assault Review, Miniatures Review, Moonlight Mechanix Scenario (MkII), Mobile Suit Mekton Part II, Nashan's Arena (Btech) and more.
- MECHA PRESS #12, Gundam 0083: Gundam 0083 Synopsis Part V, Miniatures Review, Modeling Spaceships, Heavy Gear Preview, Mecha in Ogre, Mecha Shop 101 (TFOS), Victory Stables (Btech) and more.
- MECHA PRESS #13, Armored Trooper Votoms: Madcat Model Overview Part II, Votoms Synopsis, V Gundam Models Review, B0MM Part 1: Introduction, OHMU Review, Silhouette Preview, Cyberwalkers for Ogre, Jovian Chronicles Uniforms, Hover-Tank 'Mechs (Btech) and more.
- MECHA PRESS #14, House Special (Jovian Chronicles, Heavy Gear, Moonlight Mechanix): Zeorymer Overview, Detonator Orgun Overview, Votoms Synopsis Part II, HGF "Mishaps" Card Insert, HGF Questions & Answers, V Gundam Models Review Part II, BoMM Part 2: Tools, Miniatures Review, EO: Cockpit Systems, Battletech Short Story and more.
- MECHA PRESS #15, Victory Gundam: Building Btech's Hollander in 1/72 scale, Jovian Chronicles Miniatures Review, Votoms Synopsis Part III, HGF: Continuous Play, HGF: Mastering Combos, Speed Racer Models Review, BoMM Part 3: Paints, Marauder 2107 Review, The Secret Organization Campaign, Super Deformed Jovian Chronicles, Revised Play Sequence for Mecha!, Lithium-Fusion Engines (Btech) and more.
- MECHA PRESS #16, Patlabor the Movie II: Building the "Guinness" C1/Zeta Gundam, Changing Omnimechs Configurations on Miniatures, Votoms Synopsis Part IV, HGF: "Fortune" Card Insert, HGF: Improved Fighting, Bubblegum Crisis Miniatures Review, Btech Novels Review, BoMM Part 4: Pre-Assembly, BoMM Part 5: Glues, Dirtside II Review, HG: Duelling Scale, Ultra Mekton (Giant Monster in MkII), Mecha! Battle Scenario, Btech 'Mech Rifles and more.
- MECHA PRESS #17, Battletech the Animation: Galaxy Fraulein, Comic Book Review, Building the Victory Gundam, Votoms Synopsis Part V, HGF: Q&A II, Legion of Steel Miniatures Review, BoMM Part 6: Assembly, Full Thrust Review, HG: Bio of a Rover, The Mecha Rescue Campaign, Btech Special Shield Rules and more.
