= Into the Badlands =

Into the Badlands may refer to:

- Into the Badlands (film), a 1991 television film
- Into the Badlands (TV series), a 2015–2019 television series
- Into the Badlands (Heavy Gear), a 1996 supplement for the role-playing game Heavy Gear
