= Gear Krieg Wargaming Companion =

Gear Krieg Wargaming Companion is a 2001 role-playing game supplement published by Dream Pod 9 for Gear Krieg.

== Contents ==
Gear Krieg Wargaming Companion is a supplement in which statistics for units and weaponry are introduced.

== Reviews ==
- Pyramid
- Backstab
