= Video Fighter: Dragons of Fury =

Card game

Video Fighter: Dragons of Fury is a 1994 card game published by Dream Pod 9.

== Gameplay ==
Video Fighter: Dragons of Fury is a game in which the gameplay aims to replicate the fast-paced, tactical combat of arcade-style fighters like Mortal Kombat and Street Fighter, using a card-based system. Mechanically, Video Fighter includes the use of offensive, defensive, and strategy cards, using martial artists and hand-to-hand combat styles. The four combat types in Video Fighter are Punch, Kick, Chi, and Psi, emphasizing physical and mystical techniques over armed conflict. Fighters accumulate Stun damage, which affects their ability to defend and retaliate.

== Publication history ==
Video Fighter: Dragons of Fury was designed by Jean Carrières with artwork by Ghislain Barbe and was originally intended to be the debut title in Dream Pod 9's "Silhouette" series, and its packaging—a videocassette-style box—was designed to evoke the feel of a "video game in a box" in a tabletop game.

At the time of releasing Video Fighter, Dream Pod 9 was a division of IANUS Publications. They later used similar game mechanics to Video Fighter to create Project A-KO Fighter.

== Reception ==
Scott Haring reviewed Video Fighter: Dragons of Fury for Pyramid magazine and stated that "The idea is to simulate with a card game the quick action and tactical moves of a Mortal Kombat or Streetfighter video game. And while that's a pretty ambitious goal, Video Fighter comes pretty close to succeeding."
