= Field Guide: Northern Vehicles 2 =

Field Guide: Northern Vehicles 2 is a 1996 role-playing game supplement for Heavy Gear published by Dream Pod 9.

== Contents ==
Field Guide: Northern Vehicles 2 is a supplement which details both previously published and new mecha designs (called Heavy Gears) and conventional vehicles used by the Northern faction, as well as technical specifications, specialized variants, full color counters for tabletop play, record sheets, and illustrations for the Heavy Gears and vehicles.

== Reception ==
Jim Swallow reviewed Field Guide: Northern Vehicles 2 for Arcane magazine, rating it a 5 out of 10 overall. Swallow comments that "For the most part, the Field Guides are of the most use to wargamers using the Heavy Gear background, while roleplayers will likely see the mecha showcased here in the hands of NPCs and the enemy. Like most of the Heavy Gear material currently available, the books are produced with an eye to clarity and careful precision, and with a degree of modularity which means they don't have to be an essential purchase."
