= CORE Command Player's Handbook =

CORE Command Player's Handbook is a 2003 role-playing game supplement published by Dream Pod 9 for CORE Command.

== Contents ==
CORE Command Player's Handbook is a supplement in which basic rules and character design and provided for players.

== Reviews ==
- Pyramid
- Backstab
