= Adrift on the River of Dream =

2001 role-playing game supplement

Adrift on the River of Dream is a 2001 role-playing game supplement published by Dream Pod 9 for Tribe 8.

== Contents ==
Adrift on the River of Dream is a supplement in which magical synthesis is detailed along with the spiritual world of the river of dream.

== Reviews ==
- Pyramid
- Backstab
