= Tactical Air Support (Heavy Gear) =

Tactical Air Support is a 1996 role-playing game supplement published by Dream Pod 9 for Heavy Gear.

== Contents ==
Tactical Air Support is a supplement in which the rules are expanded into aerial warfare, introducing aviation rules that span helicopters, blimps, and supersonic jets across the skies of Terra Nova. It offers two distinct combat scales—Air War for large-scale battles and Dogfight for one-on-one engagements—although the system does not permit switching between them mid-game. Additionally, the air-to-ground combat mechanics have no definitive rules for interactions between aircraft and land units. Alongside design rules and optional mechanics, the supplement includes stats for 20 aircraft and new equipment examples. A Gamesmaster section offers adventure seeds and 25 ready-to-use NPCs, enabling quick campaign launches. Further chapters cover equipment and army lists, all wrapped in a 110-page format.

== Reception ==
Jim Swallow reviewed Tactical Air Support for Arcane magazine, rating it a 5 out of 10 overall, and stated that "This is good stuff, but loses out because of its lack of counter-sheet and the problems switching between scales."
