= Field Guide: Southern Vehicles 2 =

Game supplement

Front cover

Field Guide: Southern Vehicles 2 is a supplement published by Dream Pod 9 in 1996 for the science-fiction role-playing game Heavy Gear that focuses on mecha war machines and futuristic vehicles.

== Contents ==
Field Guide: Southern Vehicles 2 is a supplement which details both previously published and new mecha designs (called Heavy Gears) and conventional vehicles used by the Southern faction, as well as technical specifications, specialized variants, full color counters for tabletop play, record sheets, and illustrations for the Heavy Gears and vehicles.

== Publication history ==
Canadian publisher Dream Pod 9 published the mecha science fiction game Heavy Gear in 1994, and also released many expansions and supplements. This included four supplements describing mecha, vehicles and weapons in both the northern and southern regions. One of these, Field Guide: Southern Vehicles 2, released in 1996, was created by Jean Carrières.

== Reception ==
In Issue 9 of the UK magazine Arcane, Jim Swallow noted, ""For the most part, the Field Guides are of the most use to wargamers using the Heavy Gear background, while roleplayers will likely see the mecha showcased here in the hands of NPCs and the enemy." Swallow concluded by giving the book a below-average rating of only 5 out of 10, saying, "Like most of the Heavy Gear material currently available, the books are produced with an eye to clarity and careful precision, and with a degree of modularity which means they don't have to be an essential purchase."

In the French magazine Casus Belli, Fabrice Colin commented, "Lovers of fine mechanics will take revenge with Southern Vehicles 2. It is a pure concentrate of war machines, perfectly faithful to the spirit of the game, in keeping with how we have perceived the game."
