= Project A-ko: The Roleplaying Game =

Tabletop anime role-playing game

Project A-ko: The Roleplaying Game is a tabletop role-playing game published by Dream Pod 9 in 1995.

== Description ==
Project A-ko: The Roleplaying Game is based on the Project A-ko anime film.

== Publication history ==
The design team of IANVS Publications (now Protoculture) created a new game system, Silhouette, to allow them to publish their own role-playing games. Two years later, Project A-Ko: The Roleplaying Game (1995) by Jimmy Mah became the first Silhouette game of Dream Pod 9, which had been formed in 1994 to indicate a new beginning for the company with its new game system. The game was published to be sold at Gen Con 26. The Silhouette game system that premiered in Project A-Ko was designed to be simple to make games fast and easy to play.

Dream Pod 9 became a fully independent company in 1995, and retained most of the dozen employees from IANVS under Pierre Oulette and they were able to keep Project A-Ko and the other role-playing games. Rather than continue to supplement Project A-Ko, Dream Pod 9 published a second Silhouette game, Heavy Gear, in 1995.

== Reviews ==
- Rollespilsmagasinet Fønix (Danish) (Issue 10 - October/November 1995)
- d8 Magazine #2
