= Marauder 2107 =

Marauder 2107 is a 1994 role-playing game published by Maelstrom Hobby.

== Gameplay ==
Marauder 2107 is a game in which post-apocalyptic Japan is the setting for a science fiction role-playing game.

== Reception ==
Denys Bakriges reviewed Marauder 2107 in White Wolf #47 (Sept., 1994), rating it a 3.5 out of 5 and stated that "This game is a good value for the price. Marauder 2107 is meant to be derivative of many other science fiction sources. Because the game's Japanese setting may be unfamiliar, those who aren't into Japaninmation may find the game uninspiring."

== Reviews ==
- Mecha Press #15
