= D20 Mecha Compendium =

d20 Mecha Compendium is a 2003 role-playing game supplement for d20 System published by Dream Pod 9.

== Contents ==
d20 Mecha Compendium is a supplement in which a genre‑spanning arsenal of nearly a hundred fantasy‑to‑sci‑fi mecha, complete with eleven adventure settings, world lore, campaign tools, and stats, equips gamemasters and players with ready‑to‑run machines and rules.

== Reviews ==
- Pyramid
- Fictional Reality (Issue 12 - Jun 2003)
- d20Zine #6 (Dec., 2003)
- Anduin (Issue 88 - Jul 2004)
