= Mektek Studios =

Canadian video game development studio

- Company type: Private
- Industry: Video games
- Founded: 2006
- Founder: Vince McMullin, James Taylor
- Headquarters: Saint John, New Brunswick, Canada
- Products: See complete products listing
- Website: www.mektek.net

Mektek Studios is a Canadian video game development studio based in Saint John, New Brunswick. Their first game, Heavy Gear Assault, has been published by StompyBot Productions, though is now inactive.

== History ==
Mektek Studios started as a MechWarrior 4: Mercenaries Modification group which introduced new playable Mechs to the game. They partnered with Smith & Tinker to release MechWarrior 4 along with their modifications on their site for free in 2009.

On 20 May 2013, Mektek began a kickstarter for Heavy Gear Assault which was cancelled. Stating they are "currently evaluating other strategies to raise awareness regarding Heavy Gear and looking at multiple means to get the Heavy Gear name out there."

On 20 February 2015, Mektek hosted their first tournament which was backed by MSI and Razer

== Development history ==
Game	Release Date	Publisher	Notes	Platform(s)
MechWarrior 4: Mercenaries	1 May 2010	Microsoft Game Studios	Modification and Revival	PC
Heavy Gear Assault	2016	StompyBot Productions	Standalone title	PC, PS4, XONE
