= Lightning Strike (game) =

1999 board game

Lightning Strike is a 1999 miniatures wargame published by Dream Pod 9.

== Gameplay ==
Lightning Strike is a game in which tactical fleet combat takes place in the Jovian Chronicles universe.

== Reviews ==
- Pyramid
- Backstab
