= Into the Badlands (Heavy Gear) =

Tabletop role-playing game supplement

Into the Badlands is a 1996 role-playing game supplement for Heavy Gear published by Dream Pod 9.

== Contents ==
Into the Badlands is a sourcebook which details background information for the balkanized planet of Terra Nova.

== Reception ==
James Swallow reviewed Into the Badlands for Arcane magazine, rating it an 8 out of 10 overall. Swallow comments that "For Heavy Gear players on the lookout for fresh challenges, Into the Badlands holds more than enough for a dozen campaigns."

== Reviews ==
- Casus Belli #96
