= Ghislain Barbe =

Canadian artist

Ghislain Barbe is a Canadian illustrator and artist. He is best known for designing the visual aspects of the Heavy Gear science fiction franchise in the 1990s and early 2000s. He was also responsible for the overall graphics of publisher Dream Pod 9's role-playing game lines Jovian Chronicles and Tribe 8, along with some other works, for which he illustrated nearly a hundred books.

He also created the visuals for the characters of PBS's educational cartoon TV series Sagwa, the Chinese Siamese Cat and collaborated to several other shows such as CinéGroupe's Lion of oz and the badge of courage and Pig City.

In the videogames industry, apart from art directing console games (Teen Titans, Monster House, Indiana Jones and the Staff of Kings), he designed some of the newer characters of the Carmen Sandiego franchise, such as Cole Gannon and the V.I.L.E. Bots for the video game Carmen Sandiego: The Secret of the Stolen Drums.
