= Heavy Gear II =

1999 video game

- Developer: Activision
- Publisher: Activision (Note: Loki Software published the Linux port of the game.)
- Director: Jack Mamais
- Producer: Eveline M. Cureteau
- Designer: David White
- Programmer: Jean-Marc Morel
- Artist: Danny Matson
- Writers: Ted Peterson; Robert Berger
- Composer: Albert Lloyd Olson
- Series: Heavy Gear
- Platforms: Windows, Linux
- Release: Windows: NA: June 17, 1999; UK: July 4, 1999; Linux; April 5, 2000
- Genres: First-person shooter Vehicle simulation
- Modes: Single-player multiplayer

Heavy Gear II is a mecha based first-person shooter video game. Set in Dream Pod 9's Heavy Gear universe, the game was developed and published by Activision in 1999 for Microsoft Windows; it was ported to Linux in 2000 by Loki Software. It is a sequel to the 1997 video game Heavy Gear.

== Plot ==
An atrocity caused by the New Earth Concordat (NEC) — the destruction of the Badlands city of Peace River by an antimatter bomb — leads to a formal cease-fire between the Northern and Southern Leagues. A team of elite Special-Ops pilots from across the planet, equipped with advanced prototype Gears and a newly unveiled intersystem assault shuttle, are sent through the interstellar Tannhauser gate to the planet Caprice, the nearest NEC base, to find out more and strike back at the enemy.

== Gameplay ==
Heavy Gear II incorporates third-person and stealth elements.

== Development ==
System requirements
Requirement	Requirements
Windows
Operating system	Windows 95
CPU	166 MHz Pentium
Memory	64 MB
Graphics hardware	DirectX 6.1 compatible video card
Linux
Operating system	Linux kernel 2.2.x
CPU	233 MHz Pentium
Memory	64 MB
Graphics hardware	OpenGL compatible video card

Development of Heavy Gear II began during the autumn of 1997 with an aggressive 13 month schedule which aimed to ship the game in autumn 1998. The Heavy Gear II team was a newly formed group within Activision, composed of some of the best and brightest employees that the firm had available, each of whom had experience working on several 3D games previously. The design team wanted to move away from the larger BattleMech style gears as found in the original Heavy Gear, and to smaller, more agile gears, staying truer the Heavy Gear universe and allowing for faster paced and more diverse gameplay.

Work began on a new game engine, named Dark Side, to power the title. Built in C++, the first priority for the engine was stability, with a focus on memory management and leak tracking, allowing developers to spot memory leaks as soon as they occurred, rather than later on in a test cycle. By adopting a modular approach to their engine design, developers could easily switch in and out different systems as they experimented during the development process.

Although there were debates within the team regarding the issue, it was concluded that software rendering was insufficient to deliver on the teams' visual goals, and so support was dropped from the engine, making video cards a necessity to run Heavy Gear II. This allowed the team to focus on delivering a single high quality product, saving the team from having to replicate in-game assets at lower level of details for lower specification machines, cutting time in production and testing. By targeting only video card equipped machines, Heavy Gear II could feature more units on screen and greater environmental detail.

Offloading the visual rendering to dedicated video cards allowed for CPU cycles to be freed up for other uses such as AI systems. The approach to AI was to go for a high level "autopilot" system, whereby non-player characters could decide for themselves what objectives to achieve and how to go about it. This reduced the need for individually scripted actions, and enforced a consistent feel across all missions. Enemy units have a tactical awareness on the battlefield, and will keep track of the successes and failures of different approaches against the player character, varying their tactics depending on the situation. Enemy units may split off into separate fireteams, call upon reinforcements or order artillery strikes against the player.

Multiplayer was an important element in the game, and it was implemented using an internal Activision networking SDK early in development, before even the single-player portion of the game. Although co-operative multiplayer was also planned, this feature had to be dropped, as it proved impossible to populate the game with enough enemy units to make the game challenging. The missions designed for the planned co-op mode were, however, saved for the standalone single-player "Historic Missions" in the final game.

Despite the experience of the team, Heavy Gear II did not adhere to the intended schedule. The team underestimated the work needed to produce a demo, and did not factor in costs involved with employee turnover into their original schedule. When the game was released in June 1999, it had missed the intended ship date by approximately nine months. This slippage also had a negative impact on the effectiveness of the marketing campaign. The Dark Side engine would be used again in Activision's Interstate '82, released later that year.

In October 1999, Loki Software was assigned to port Heavy Gear II across to Linux. The Linux port took Loki Software approximately 6 months to complete, and was described by Loki as "their most challenging product to date". As Heavy Gear II uses Microsoft's proprietary Direct3D API for graphical rendering, Loki had to port this to OpenGL in order for it to run on Linux. To realise the game's 3D sound on Linux, Loki worked with support from Creative Technology to build an open standard audio API from scratch with a cross-platform free software implementation, named OpenAL. Heavy Gear II was the first Direct3D game to be ported to OpenGL, and was the first to implement OpenAL. The Linux port was released in April 2000, and a demo followed in June.

== Reception ==
Reception

Aggregate score
Aggregator	Score
GameRankings	81%

Review scores
Publication	Score
AllGame	4/5
CNET Gamecenter	7/10
Computer Games Strategy Plus	3.5/5
Computer Gaming World	4.5/5
EP Daily	8.5/10
Game Informer	8.5/10
GameRevolution	A−
GameSpot	9/10
IGN	8.4/10
Maximum PC	9/10
Next Generation	5/5
PC Accelerator	7/10
PC Gamer (US)	92%

The game received favourable reviews according to the review aggregation website GameRankings. The game was compared favourably to its predecessor, Heavy Gear, with PC Zone stating that it was a huge improvement over the first game, and GameSpot believing that Activision had redeemed itself for the failures of the original.

Critics praised the gameplay. NextGen described the game as "a big, splendid mech sim, with lots of depth and excellent balance between action and strategy". PC Zone echoed similar sentiments, calling it "a commendable stab at creating a balanced blend of strategy and all-out bot-blasting action". IGN highlighted the diversity on offer, stating that the "variety in environments, variety in Gear loadout and variety in gameplay" was above and beyond that offered by others in the genre.

The Dark Side powered graphics were well received. GameSpot described the graphics as being "very impressive, with detailed, heavily articulated gears and vehicles, natural-looking fauna [and] vivid landscapes". Maximum PC described the engine as "gorgeous", praising it for providing "sharply rendered mechs and terrain details, as well as eye-popping explosions that light up the landscape" and other graphical effects. It did note, however, that there were "a few clipping and polygon-collision-detection glitches", similar detractions were noted by Linux Journal and IGN. Performance wise, PC Gamer UK found it ran surprisingly well, even below the minimum requirements, while Maximum PC noted that the game maintained a consistent 30 fps on their test machine. IGN warned, however, that they encountered several crash bugs on the instant action and historical mission modes.

Critics enjoyed the Gear customisation options. IGN, NextGen and Linux Journal all highlighted the sheer number of options available. Although GameSpot felt that the "threat level" limitation was artificial, it praised the flexibility it offered. PC Zone stated it was "a joy to give birth to these new creations and see them succeed in the task they were created for", in regards to the Gear customisation process.

Response to the AI was mixed. GameSpot praised the AI as challenging, and PC Zone described the enemy AI as being "clued-up on battle tactics", able to "dodge and weave all over the place" as well as seek reinforcements. PC Gamer UK disagreed, accusing the AI of being "absolutely, hilariously terrible", a view shared with Linux Journal, who described the AI as being "basically pathetic", both critics cited examples of poor pathfinding.

Critics reacted favourably to the multiplayer options. PC Zone described it as being "well-conceived and well-supported", highlighting the various modes of multiplayer gameplay and the "thriving clan structure". While IGN felt that there was nothing particularly new or innovative in the multiplayer game, and Maximum PC felt that it was not as strong as the single player experience, both critics still felt the multiplayer experience to be worthwhile. GameSpot compared the multiplayer element favourably to that of rival mecha game, MechWarrior 3, but, like Linux Journal, found the lack of co-operative multiplayer a disappointment.

Some critics pointed out difficulty in adapting to the controls. PC Zone found the controls frustrating, warning readers about the "virtually insurmountable learning curves". The control system was described as the most notable flaw in the game by IGN, with the critic having to resort to using a printed controls reference card included with the game. Linux Journal looked at it from the other direction though, pointing out that once mastered, "the payoff, however, is extraordinary; the level of control a player has in HG2 is amazing".

The game was commercially unsuccessful. In the United States, it sold 15,000 units by the end of July 1999, according to PC Data. Mark Asher of CNET Gamecenter called these figures "pretty awful" and remarked that it "has to be a major disappointment for Activision". The game's sales in the United States rose to 28,598 copies by the end of 1999. Daily Radar's Andrew S. Bub named it the most unfairly overlooked simulation title of the year.

The game was nominated for Computer Gaming World's 1999 "Science Fiction Simulator of the Year" award, which went to Freespace 2. It was also nominated for PC PowerPlay's "Best Fantasy Sim" award, which went to MechWarrior 3.

Although a sequel was reported to be in production at Savage Entertainment, this was ultimately cancelled. Activision would discontinue development on the Heavy Gear franchise in 2002, believing that strictly PC games such as Heavy Gear II did not have a viable future with the launch and growth of sixth generation consoles. No further news of Heavy Gear video games appeared until 2012, when Dream Pod 9 announced that Stompy Bot Productions were to produce a new game. In 2013, Stompy Bot launched a crowdfunding campaign, aiming to raise $900,000 towards the development of Heavy Gear Assault. Though the Kickstarter element of the campaign failed, development of the game is still ongoing.
