= Heavy Gear Fighter =

Canadian card game

Heavy Gear Fighter is a standalone card game for two players which is set in the universe of Heavy Gear. It was published by Canadian game publisher Dream Pod 9 in 1995. The game is currently not in print.

== Game description ==
Heavy Gear Fighter is a dueling card game where two Heavy Gears fight it out in the area called Badlands. Everything required to play comes with the box, which contained 116 cards.

Each playing card has a full color illustration of a Gear. The cards are divided as Attacks of different strengths, as Defenses, and Special Effects. Both of the players draw cards from the same draw pile.

Heavy Gear Fighter does not use any dice or paper. There is a full color record/action sheet for each playable Gear which is used to track actions and damage using small counters. Players deal cards from their hand to inflict damage, defend against attacks from the enemy, and cause various special effects.

== Expansion sets ==
An expansion set for Heavy Gear Fighter, a 72-card set named Equipment & Weapons, was published in 1995. This set added new Equipment and Weapon cards which could be played to enhance the Gears.

Three "mini-sets" of 12 cards (Mishaps, Fortune and Booster Set 1) were included in various magazines as promotional material, such as Mecha Press and White Wolf Magazine. These inserted cards were listed as optional and allowed the players to create special conditions for combat and execute different maneuvers.

Another set was designed with new vehicles (such as tanks and Striders), but this set was never published.

== Reception ==
Robert DeVoe reviewed Heavy Gear Fighter: Showdown in the Badlands in White Wolf Inphobia #52 (Feb., 1995), rating it a 5 out of 5 and stated that "A very enjoyable game. Also provided are rules to apply the card game to the Heavy Gear RPG."

Scott Haring reviewed Heavy Gear Fighter in Pyramid #14 (August, 1995), and stated that "Heavy Gear Fighter: Showdown in the Badlands is a quick, colorful, tactical card game of mecha combat. The mecha in Heavy Gear aren't the titanic walking beasts of BattleTech or other games; they're a little smaller (a mere 15 feet or so tall), and have a terrific, lithe athletic look that the larger walking gun emplacements don't have."
