= Jovian Chronicles =

Tabletop role-playing game setting

Cover of the 2005 Jovian Chronicles core book

Jovian Chronicles is a science fiction game setting published by Dream Pod 9 since 1997. It introduces a complete universe for role-playing and wargaming space combat featuring mecha, giant spacecraft, and epic space battles.

The Jovian Chronicles setting was originally published as a pair of licensed supplements for the Mekton role-playing game; Ianus Publications released two volumes—Jovian Chronicles and Europa Incident—in 1992. This first edition is known amongst fans as the "Green Edition" because of the color scheme of its cover design.

After Ianus decided to split into two ventures in 1995 — Protoculture, which would publish Protoculture Addicts magazine; and Dream Pod 9, which would design and market miniatures and gaming books, Jovian Chronicles was re-published as a full-fledged game line in 1997 by Dream Pod 9, this time using their own in-house rule system. This edition, because of its white cover, is known as the "White Edition", and subsequent supplements are also called this, even though several of the supplemental books feature a dark blue starfield cover.

== Publication history ==
Ianus Publications had licensed the anime-related games of R. Talsorian Games, and Jovian Chronicles (1994) by Marc A. Vezina featured an original campaign setting for the Mekton role-playing game from R. Talsorian. Vezina had intended Jovian Chronicles to be published as a serial in the company's Mecha Press magazine. Jovian Chronicles was instead published as a standalone setting and supplemented soon after with Europa Incident (1994). Dream Pod 9 was soon split out from Ianus as a separate company, and their second game after Heavy Gear was Jovian Chronicles (1998), a game based on Dream Pod 9's Silhouette system, and a variant of the setting they previously published for Mekton. The new edition changed the theme to encompass an anime mecha game, a space-opera starfighter game, as well a near-future game using hard science. Many of the mecha were redesigned to accommodate a video game that would have been released by Activision but was never published.

The later Silhouette CORE Rulebook (2003) presented a new version of Silhouette meant to work as a standalone generic rules system, followed soon after with the Mecha Companion (2003) containing d20 System game statistics for every mecha found in Heavy Gear, Jovian Chronicles and Gear Krieg using the mecha rules from d20 Mecha (2003) from Guardians of Order. The second edition of Jovian Chronicles was also released in 2003.

In 2017, Dream Pod 9 launched a Kickstarter to create new resin spaceship miniatures. The goal was to raise 9,000 CAD; with the support of 143 backers, they raised a total of 25,090 CAD. Dream Pod 9 reported that by November 2017 they had "completed the shipping of Backer Reward Packages". In 2018, they launched a second Kickstarter to create additional new spaceships and exo-armor squad miniatures. The goal was smaller this time (4,000 CAD) and while it was successful, it was less successful than the first Kickstarter (57 backers raising 8,708 CAD). Dream Pod 9 reported that they had begun shipping out "Backer Reward Packages" in April 2019. During this time, Beta Playtest Rules for a new edition, called Jovian Wars, were released for free on DrivethruRPG as a PDF. These rules were last updated on February 14, 2018.

== Setting ==
The game world shows one possible future, a time in which Mankind has expanded and settled the Solar System, going as far as terraforming Venus and Mars. The colonists living around Jupiter are at odds with the government of Earth, driving much of the series' intrigue. The game features a blend of action/adventure and hard-science space colonization facts. The books are based on plausible technical details to maintain a realistic hard science fiction setting.

- Mercury: a small settlement, whose main exports are high quality electronics and metals. Mercury is the headquarters of the powerful Merchant Guild, an association of companies which provide most of the transportation throughout the system.
- Venus: terraformed by a consortium of corporations, Venus is now a marginally habitable planet. The Venusian upper class and their workers live in polar arcologies, surrounded by terraforming processors.
- Earth: damaged by centuries of overpopulation and civil wars, the motherworld is home to the Central Earth Government and Administration (CEGA), a bureaucratic planetary government that believes the Earth should lead the solar system.
- Orbital Colonies: the salvation of many who fled Earth, these are huge O'Neill stations parked at the Lagrange points. Orbitals are peaceful people who follow CEGA's lead for protection.
- United Solar Nations: evolved from the old United Nations to provide a neutral arbiter between the various settlements. It has a private peace-keeping army, the USN Guard, and an interplanetary law enforcement agency, the Solar Police (SolaPol).
- The Moon: CEGA's industrial center, its inhabitants are living in huge complexes buried beneath the soil. Many of Earth's heavy industries were moved there long ago.
- Mars: a divided planet, home to the Martian Free Republic and the Martian Federation. Border clashes between the two are frequent.
- The Belt: the asteroids are populated by mobile nomad communities, each a micro-society of its own.
- Jupiter: home to refugees from Earth. The enormous space stations of the Jovian Confederacy were the first to develop and field exo-armors. Thanks to the resources of the Jovian sub-system, the Confederacy is the richest nation in the solar system.
- Titan: the largest moon of Saturn is the farthest human settlement. It is the main source for complex hydrocarbon compounds and plays an important role in the industries of the solar system.

== Anime inspirations ==
Many recent Western cartoon shows and games have Japanese anime styling. Jovian Chronicles also features anime-inspired artwork and narrative elements, though the various technical elements (ships, stations, equipment, etc.) are original works illustrated with computer art.

Exo-armors are one of the main hooks of the series, these one-crew mecha consist of big armored space suits talling 15 metres or more with weapons capable of devastating even small warships. The main source of inspiration for the game was the various iterations of the Gundam Universal Century series up to the early 1990s, with strong influence from Gundam 0083 Stardust Memories and Gundam 0080 War in the Pocket. Hints of other influences such as Patlabor and to some extent, Macross and Mospeada, are present, although no transformable mecha appear to date. Jovian Chronicles can be placed in the Real Robot anime genre.

The series art and mechanical designs were created by John Moscato and Ghislain Barbe, the latter who was also responsible for the artistic style which characterized all of the Dream Pod 9's lines including Heavy Gear and Tribe 8.

== Game rules ==
The concept has its origins on a campaign played by the authors Mark A. Vezina and Etienne Gagnon since 1987, using R. Talsorian's Mekton system. After 5 years of development, IANVS publications licensed the Mekton II rules and published the Jovian Chronicles Campaign Setting, a 112-page letter sized book which describes the JC universe, timeline, technologies and introduces players to the setting thru a 12 episode campaign. The JC campaign works as an extension of the Mekton rules set, with minimum changes required and then only for character status and wealth, however, compared to other Mecha depicted in Mekton, JC Exo-armors tend to be less resilient and their weapons are less powerful. It is also of note that at this stage, Exos tend to be more balanced with little differences among them, while on later editions, grunt exos are intentionally inferior to hero machines, for example, a CEGA Syreen and a JC Pathfinder are equally balanced in power, armor and weapons, and similar in capabilities to larger machines.

Mecha designs also vary on this edition, being more complex and elaborated in design than on latter iterations, during this release, there were also a number of metal miniatures for six of the exo-armors in the setting, these were produced by Canadian manufacturer RAFM and were based on the campaign book technical designs by John Moscato. Miniatures were in 1/325 scale due to the fictional size of the exo-armors and presented one of the finest and most dynamic mecha sculptings of the era.

The second release of Jovian Chronicles, was the first one published by DP9, adapts the Silhouette game system, a streamlined set of rules already tested and proved in Heavy Gear, Dream Pod 9's other successful science fiction game. It can be played as either a role-playing game, a tactical wargame, or an integration of both. There are major changes on this release, such as the aforementioned distinction among the different exo-armors and other equipment as well as the focus on the character creation.

Both the RPG and miniature games are built on the same basic rule mechanics. Silhouette which defines characters in terms of 10 base attributes (agility, knowledge, etc.), 5 derived attributes (health, etc.), and a variety of skills. Skill rolls make up the backbone of the system, which focuses on effect-based speed of play over grainy detail. The core mechanic involves rolling a number of 6-sided dice, taking the highest result, adding in modifiers for attributes and/or situation, and then comparing it to a set threshold number. If the result is higher than the threshold the test is a success; if it is lower the test is a failure. The margin by which the test succeeded (Margin of Success, MoS) or failed (Margin of Failure, MoF) helps to determine the outcome. Combat is handled by the same system, with characters taking penalty-inflicting wounds rather than depleting a set number of health points. As a result, the system can be lethal, especially on inexperienced characters.

New miniatures were also released for this edition, for both, exo-armor/fighters as well as spaceships. The new line of miniatures covered a much broader range of subjects, at the expense of size, being scaled at 1/500 for the exo armor/fighters which were near half the size of the original ones, this edition also marks the appearance of spaceship miniatures, which were scaled to 1/5000.

During this stage, the game system was splintered into the Silhouette Core RPG rules and the Lightning Strike system for tactical scenarios. The latter, is a more abstract version of the original tactical system which allow for combined arms maneuvers.

A third edition Jovian Wars was put on kickstarter during March–April 2017 and is in the process of delivering to its backers, the new edition is a fleet scale tactical game, whose rules are distributed for free at the DP9 website and changes (again) the scale of the miniatures to 1/1000 to exo-armors and fighters and 1/4000 for the spaceships.

This change in scale intends to represent more realistically the magnitude of the conflicts depicted, making combat units smaller and warships larger. It features a new turning template for ship maneuvers which is promoted as the major innovation in the system and due to the scale of the exo-armors, they now operate in squadrons of 3 miniatures each. With the new scale, each exo/fighter is around 15mm in height, compared to 30mm for Lightning strike minis and an average of 54mm for RAFM miniatures. The RPG aspect of the game is all but left aside.

The project was funded, however it is uncertain if besides backers, other potential or new players will accept the scale change which has turned the exo-armors, an emblematic symbol of the series and marketing hook (first edition depicted a full page illustration of a Jovian Exo-armor on cover which was also used on the RAFM blister's card) into a sort of battle counter, rather focusing on ship to ship maneuvers.

== Product Line ==
=== IANUS Games (Mekton Supplements) ===
- IMP-01: Jovian Chronicles: Campagne (January 1993).
- IMP-02: Europa Incident: Campagne (January 1995).

=== Dream Pod 9 ===
- DP9-PJC: Jovian Chronicles - Promotional Poster(2002).
- DP9-300: Jovian Chronicles - Lightning Strike Demo Game (2002).
- DP9-301: Rules & Background for Jovian Chronicles - Enter the Saga of Mankind (June 1997).
- DP9-302: Companion to Jovian Chronicles - Advanced Rules & Background(October 1997).
- DP9-303: Mechanical Catalog - Exo-Armors & Spacecraft (July 1997).
- DP9-304: Chaos Principle - Original Cinematic Adventure (April 1998).
- DP9-305: Game Aid for Jovian Chronicles - Gamemastering Made Easy (April 1998).
- DP9-306: Ships of the Fleet - Volume 1: Jovian Confederation (November 1998).
- DP9-307: Spacer's Guide - A Guide to Life in the Twenty-third Century (May 2001).
- DP9-308: Solapol - Sourcebook (May 1999).
- DP9-309: Ships of the Fleet - Volume 3: CEGA Navy (November 1999).
- DP9-310: Earth - Planet Sourcebook (June 2000).
- DP9-311: Mechanical Catalog Two - Civilian Equipment & Spacecraft (August 2000).
- DP9-312: Jovian Fleet - Blueprint File(1998).
- DP9-313: Ships of the Fleet - Volume 2: Jovian Confederation (February 1999).
- DP9-314: Lightning Strike - Fleet Combat Rules(1999).
- DP9-315: CEGA Fleet - Blueprint File (1999).
- DP9-316: Lightning Strike - Behind the Veil: Venus (1999).
- DP9-317: Jupiter - Planet Sourcebook (February 2000).
- DP9-318: Lightning Strike - Call to Arms (1999).
- DP9-319: Ships of the Fleet - Volume 4: Venus (May 2000).
- DP9-320: Shadow of CEGA - Planet Sourcebook (March 2001).
- DP9-321: Space Equipment Handbook - Advanced Tools & Weapons (December 2000).
- DP9-322: Lightning Strike - Second Edition (2000).
- DP9-323: Nomads - Planet Sourcebook (July 2001).
- DP9-324: Lightning Strike - Companion
- DP9-325: Mercury - Planet Sourcebook (January 2002).
- DP9-326: Venus - Planet Sourcebook (May 2002).
- DP9-327: Mars - Planet Sourcebook (August 2002).
- DP9-328: Cislunar Space - Planet Sourcebook (Mars 2003).
- DP9-920: Jovian Chronicles Second Edition - RPG Player's Handbook (July 2003).

== Reception ==
David L. Pulver reviewed Jovian Chronicles in White Wolf #47 (Sept., 1994), rating it a 3.5 out of 5 and stated that "If you're content with your existing Mekton campaign you may not find much use for this book. But if you want to begin anew, Jovian Chronicles offers a lot of material in a beautiful package."

Jovian Chronicles was featured on the front cover of the March–April 1997 edition of Pyramid (Vol. 1, Issue 24), and a sneak preview of the game was offered inside the same issue.

In the February 1998 edition of Dragon (Issue 244), Rick Swan reviewed both the Jovian Chronicles setting and the Heavy Gear setting (also published by Dream Pod 9), and praised the high production values: "Both are beautiful games, into which a lot of effort has been invested." Swan admired the "Silhouette" game system, calling it "the smartest set of universal rules this side of the GURPS game." But he criticized the combat rules, which he called "more work than fun", and he found little to be excited about in the setting, saying, "There's nothing terribly interesting going on here, and the game's ambitions seem awfully modest compared to the wide screen spectacle of Trinity." Given the setting's emphasis on robot combat, Swan believed that "Jovian Chronicles aims at players more interested in hardware than human beings." He concluded with an ambivalent shrug: "Other than the lifeless settings, I couldn’t find anything seriously wrong with... Jovian Chronicles. But I couldn’t find much to be excited about either."

A review of the Ship of the Fleet, Vol. 4 — a supplement describing six Venusian ships of the Jovian Chronicles line — that appeared in the August 11, 2000 issue of Pyramid found the supplement had failed in the small details that other works by Dream Pod 9 had possessed, saying "Being truly excellent is a double-edged sword: On the one hand, of course, you're excellent -- and that comes with a lot of perks. On the other hand, though, you have set yourself a very high standard indeed -- and a failure in the details suddenly becomes a notable offense."

== Reviews ==
- Mecha Press #10 (Nov./Dec. 1993)
- Alarums & Excursions #313 (Sept. 2001)
- Pyramid Volume 1 Issue #24 (March/April 1997)
- Backstab #6
- Casus Belli #109
