= Heavy Gear (video game) =

1997 video game

- Developer: Activision
- Publisher: Activision
- Director: Tim Morten
- Producer: Chacko Sonny
- Designer: Dustin Browder
- Programmer: Bill Ferrer
- Writer: Dustin Browder
- Composer: Jeehun Hwang
- Series: Heavy Gear
- Platform: Microsoft Windows
- Release: NA: November 26, 1997; EU: 1997
- Genres: First-person shooter, vehicle simulation game
- Modes: Single-player, multiplayer

Heavy Gear is a 1997 computer game made for the Windows 95 operating system, based on the Heavy Gear role-playing game. A sequel, Heavy Gear II, was released in 1999.

== Plot ==
The story follows the crew of the CNCS landship Vigilance (an enormous hovercraft carrier) as they played a cat-and-mouse game across the badlands with a rival landship from the AST, the Draco.

== Development ==
Faced with the loss of the BattleTech-MechWarrior property, Activision acquired exclusive worldwide rights to video games based on the Heavy Gear series. Heavy Gear was developed by largely the same team which created Mechwarrior 2, though with the significant addition of Frank Evers, then best known for Earthsiege 2. The game used an enhanced version of the Mechwarrior 2 game engine, and was partly derived from existing MechWarrior 2: Mercenaries code. Before the release of the PC game, an arcade version based on the Virtuality Hardware Platforms was developed but never released.

== Reception ==
Reception

Aggregate score
Aggregator	Score
GameRankings	60%

Review scores
Publication	Score
AllGame	3/5
CNET Gamecenter	8/10
Computer Games Strategy Plus	2/5
Computer Gaming World	2.5/5
Edge	7/10
EP Daily	9/10
Game Informer	8.25/10
GameRevolution	B+
GameSpot	7.3/10
Next Generation	3/5
PC Gamer (US)	82%

The game received mixed reviews according to the review aggregation website GameRankings.

Greg Fortune from Computer Gaming World wrote: "The most disappointing thing about this game is that you see lots of parts of the game that really do show care and creativity." He considered Heavy Gear a missed opportunity that failed to live up to its competitor, the MechWarrior franchise. Fortune concluded: "As it stands, the game feels more like a beta than a finished product and is woefully incomplete in many areas."

Writing for Computer Games Strategy Plus, Tom Chick summarized: "It's not a total loss, but what's good about Heavy Gear is the stuff that was good about the MechWarrior games all along. But what's bad about Heavy Gear is inexcusable coming from a veteran team of game designers."

Boba Fatt from GamePro wrote: "First-timers to the giant-robot-derby genre will enjoy Heavy Gear, but, ultimately, it's nothing more than a disappointing MechWarrior knockoff." (Note: GamePro gave the game two 4.5/5 scores for graphics and sound, 4/5 for control, and 3.5/5 for fun factor.) The reviewer from Next Generation wrote: "In creating Heavy Gear, Activision has a different universe and a better engine but a roughly designed game."

The reviewer from Pyramid #30 (March/April 1998) wrote: "A lot of hype heralded the Heavy Gear Computer Game [sic]. For months prior to its release, gaming magazines touted it as a 'Mechkiller' and the game to 'make Mechwarrior [sic] fans forget Battletech [sic]'. Briefly, it's not and it won't."

The game was nominated for the "Best Sci-Fi Sim" award at the CNET Gamecenter Awards for 1997, which went to Star Wars: X-Wing vs. TIE Fighter.
