= Lightning Strikes (band) =

American heavy metal band

- Origin: Los Angeles, California, U.S.
- Genres: Heavy metal, hard rock
- Years active: 1984–1987; 2011–present
- Label: Pure Legend
- Members: Karpis Maksudian; Barry Sparks; Norifumi Shima; Mariano Gardella
- Past members: Levon Zeytounzian; Rob Math; Cat Tate; Nando Fernandes; Mike Kazarian; Harout Khatchoyan; Brook Hansen; David Modena; Randy Thiel; Greg S. Wood
- Website: http://www.lightningstrikesrocks.com

Lightning Strikes are an American heavy metal band from Los Angeles, California originally formed in 1984 and resurrected again in 2011 by drummer/founder Karpis Maksudian with different musicians, most notably guest vocalist Tony Martin of Black Sabbath fame. Lightning Strikes carry the distinction of being the first all-Armenian-American rock band of note preceding System of a Down by a decade. The band has a now highly collectible 7” single, released in 1986, and 2016 full-length album to their credit.

== Early days ==
The origins of Lightning Strikes go back to 1983 when drummer Karpis Maksudian and guitarist Levon Mkhsigevorkian started to jam together and came up with the name Lightning Strikes. The band began to take shape in earnest when Mkhsigevorkian introduced guitarist Levon Zeytounzian to Maksudian and Mike Kazarian joined on bass. Maksudian eventually approached vocalist Harout Khatchoyan about singing for the band after hearing him perform Elvis Presley and Rockabilly style songs.

By 1985, Lightning Strikes were up and running playing their inaugural show at The Hollywood Roosevelt Hotel ballroom in and getting ready to record their debut single when bassist Mike Kazarian quit due to musical differences. He was replaced by Cat Tate with whom the band entered the studio to record the "Lightning Strikes" b/w "Lottery Ticket" 7" single; keyboardist John Harjo was also brought in for the purpose of these sessions. The single was released in mid-1986 and received airplay on local radio stations KMET, KLOS and KCME. Keyboardist Brook Hansen would join the band as a full-time member as Lightning Strikes began to make inroads on the Southern California club scene playing venues such the Roxy, Country Club, Jezebel's and opening up for Faster Pussycat at the Troubadour.

Still, by late 1986 the members went their separate ways with only Maksudian left to carry on. He recruited an all-new line-up consisting of vocalist David Modena, guitarist Randy Thiel and bassist Greg S. Wood. The revamped band would venture out of state for gigs in Phoenix, Arizona and Las Vegas, Nevada before calling it quits for good in late 1987. Maksudian gave up music altogether and instead turned his focus on his career in the local TV news business. Starting in the mid-2000s, he would direct and edit several music videos for Leatherwolf and Mandy Lion's World War III.

== Reformation and first album ==
In 2011, Maksudian decided to get back into music and began to assemble a new Lightning Strikes line-up including bassist Cat Tate, who had played on the band's 1986 single, guitarist Rob Math, a member of Leatherwolf and Player, and Brazilian vocalist Nando Fernandes who came recommended by way of noted guitarist/producer Roy Z. Re-working some of the band's old unreleased material and writing new songs, Maksudian started recording what would become the eponymous Lightning Strikes debut album, pulling in well known guests musicians, including keyboardist Derek Sherinian, vocalist Tony Martin, and vocalist Noah of Japanese visual kei artists Avanchick, to assist in the effort, with Roy Z mixing the album.

In September 2016 it was announced that Lightning Strikes had signed a worldwide record deal with German label Pure Legend Records. Issued on November 18, 2016, the album's release was accompanied by a promotional video for the song "Death Valley", featuring Tony Martin. A second video for the band's cover of the Deep Purple classic "Our Lady" followed in conjunction with the album's wider North American release in January 2017. Lightning Strikes enjoyed its biggest success in Japan where the album entered the Burrn! magazine Import Charts and stayed there for 3 months peaking at Nr. 6.

A limited edition vinyl version of Lightning Strikes, including both cuts from the band's 1986 single as bonus tracks, was released in November 2017, along with a video for the song "Can't Cross the Rainbow".

== Second album 'The King Is Victorious' ==
In March 2025, Lightning Strikes announced that they were in the process of recording a new album, titled The King Is Victorious, with a multi-national core line-up of Maksudian, Japanese guitarist, Norifumi Shima, American bassist, Barry Sparks, and Argentinian vocalist, Mariano Gardella, as well as returning guest keyboardist, Derek Sherinian. It was also revealed that the album's title track was set to feature the 45-piece Moscow Symphony Orchestra as well as guest spots from guitarists, Rowan Robertson, Rob Math, Dario Mollo, Mark Zavon, Takehiko ‘Shake’ Kogure, keyboardist Michael T. Ross. and former Dio member, Craig Goldy.

== Members ==
=== Current line-up ===
- Karpis Maksudian – drums
- Barry Sparks – bass
- Norifumi Shima – guitars
- Mariano Gardella – vocals

=== Past members ===
- Cat Tate – bass
- Rob Math – guitars
- Nando Fernandes – vocals

=== Original line-up ===
- Karpis Maksudian – drums
- Mike Kazarian – bass
- Levon Zeytounzian – guitar
- Harout Khatchoyan – vocals

== Discography ==
- Lightning Strikes (Pure Legend, 2016)
- "Lightning Strikes" b/w "Lottery Ticket" 7" (1986)
