= Tribe 8 (role-playing game) =

Tabletop science fantasy role-playing game

The Past is Dead; Your Future Begins Now
- First edition cover
- Designers: Philippe R. Boulle, Stéphane Brochu, Joshua Mosqueira-Asheim
- Publishers: Dream Pod 9
- Publication: 1998; 28 years ago
- Genres: Post-apocalyptic fantasy
- Systems: Silhouette
- ISBN: 978-1896776231

Tribe 8 is a fantasy/post-apocalypse role-playing game designed by Philippe R. Boulle, Stéphane Brochu and Joshua Mosqueira-Asheim with visuals by Ghislain Barbe. It was first released in 1998 by Canadian publisher Dream Pod 9 as a departure from their mostly mecha line of hard science fiction games.

== Publication history ==
The third game released by Dream Pod 9 was a new approach for the company, the post-apocalyptic fantasy game Tribe 8 (1998) by Phil Boulle, Josh Mosqueira and Stéphane Brochu. Following the release of Tribe 8, Dream Pod 9 focused most of their new role-playing game production on this new line, making Tribe 8 the top selling RPG for the company from 1999-2001. Tribe 8 second edition was later released in 2004.

== Setting ==
Tribe 8 is a near future game in which the player characters are exiles from their tribes looking to form an eighth tribe based on their fables, while they deal with warring factions and a world invaded by creatures from beyond the River of Dream.

Tribe 8 takes place in a land known as Vimary, which is a post-apocalyptic Montreal, Quebec, Canada. At some indeterminate point in history, something has gone horribly, cosmically wrong. Though the nature of this disaster is never fully explained, the result was the appearance of the "Z'bri", twisted demonic creatures of spirit who either initiated the fall of the "World Before," or came in the wake of its destruction. The Z'bri, needing flesh to sate their demonic hungers, herded the majority of humanity into camps where they were killed or enslaved until the "Fatimas" (Avatars of what is called "The One Goddess") imbued humanity with hope and with Synthesis, a potent but subtle form of dream magic. In this way, the Z'bri were fought back into the wilds. The Fatimas then established the tribal lands of Vimary, protecting the inhabitants of their own tribes.

Player characters typically take on the role of the Fallen, outcasts from the Tribes who live on the exile island of Hom (present day Île Sainte-Hélène). Although many of the Fallen truly are criminal, many have also been cast out from the Tribes due to their inability to deal with the unjust society that the Fatimas have built. They are heretics, warriors, dreamers, and leaders who hope to build something even when society has abandoned them.

The game has a strong metaplot, which tells the tale of the Fallen's struggle with the Tribes, the demonic Z'bri who had destroyed the world before, and also with themselves. It focuses on themes of spirituality, horror, and the cost of hope in a world that has gone terribly wrong.

== The Fatimas ==
The Fates:

- Magdalen the Lover – She is the aspect of the One Goddess' sensuality, mystery and passion. Magdalen appears cloaked in gauzy capes covering a body wrapped in barbed wire, her face hidden behind a hood that is zippered closed. Magdelen's children traditionally play the roles of diplomats, courtesans, pharmacists and whores, and the Synthesis power given to them by their Fatima generally center around seduction and betrayal.
- Eva the Mother – She is the earth mother, the One Goddess' aspect of fertility, with the ability to both create and to destroy. Her anima form is like a headless Venus of Willendorf with gigantic leather bat wings. Her children are farmers, nurses, midwives, healers and caretakers and are granted the Synthesis powers that concentrate on empathy and the manipulation of life-force energy.
- Baba Yaga the Crone – The keeper of the Fold (the gateway between the physical and spiritual realms), Baba Yaga is a miasma of old bones, earth, wood, rot and decay. She rattles like a dying breath and travels in a swarm of flies. Her children are loremasters, witches and death priests, and they are given Synthesis powers over death and dreaming.

The Pillars of the Nation:

- Joan the Warrior – Once a fierce and tireless warrior, Joan is reclusive and silent since the death of her brother Joshua. She is a dauntingly powerful figure in a huge brutal black steel frame with bare rebar wings and fearsome weapons. Her children are both the noble defenders and protectors of the tribes as well as the brutal enforcers of Tera Sheba's will. They are smiths and soldiers, templars and glassblowers, and they are gifted with Synthesis governing martial ability, physical prowess and personal tenacity.
- Tera Sheba the Wise – She is the governance of law and judgment in Vimary. Presenting herself in reams of cloth and parchment, with fans declaring office and three wooden heads, gagged, blindfolded and deafened in turn, Tera Sheba carries a terrifying authority. Her children are the lawmakers, adjudicators, inquisitors and lore keepers, and they are gifted with Synthesis governing truth, wisdom and tradition.

The Dancers:

- Dahlia the Trickster – The joy and movement of the One Goddess, Dahlia is an ever-changing apparition of elusive masks and fans. Among all the tribes, only Her children do not have tribal lands of their own. Instead they are nomadic, following caravan routes throughout Vimary and into the surrounding lands. They are dancers, traders, tinkers, entertainers, actors, envoys and outrunners, and are gifted with the Synthesis abilities that govern illusion and motion.
- Agnes the Child – Agnes was not one of the original eight Fatimas. She is a child Fatima born of the ashes of Mary the Forgiver, who died soon after her brother Joshua. Agnes is composed of two parts, a large frightening teddy bear with iron jaws and scissor claws, and a small bedraggled rag doll. Her tribe is a Lord of the Flies-like environment where children are the leaders, who grow into obscurity either by breeding new children or becoming slaves to the tribe. Agnes' children are given the Synthesis gifts that pertain to capriciousness, inspiration and wonder.

The Dead:

- Joshua the Ravager – The only male Fatima died following the liberation of humanity from the camps, as he and his tribe of berserk warriors led the charge to drive the Z'bri lords and their beasts back from the lands of Vimary. The circumstances of his death are mysterious, carrying special portent due to a prophecy that he uttered before dying: he proclaimed that his death would be avenged, and that his tribe would arise again from the wretches and the outcasts. Tribe 8 gets its name from this prophecy and the belief of many of the Fallen that they are the children of this prophecy.

== Release history ==
The first printing of the core rulebook was soft cover and was later reprinted in a hardcover format. An extensive line of Tribe 8 books was printed, consisting of "Word of" books, cycle books, Legend books, and setting sourcebooks. The "Word of" books focused on the details of the Tribes and their society. Cycle books were a linked series of adventures that built up an epic story of the Fallen and their search for destiny. The setting sourcebooks covered lands and places in detail, expanding the world – including books giving more detail on the Z'bri, the River of Dream, and the Outlands. Finally the Legend books were short series of stories with adventures not connected to the meta-plot of the cycle books.

Tribe 8, 2nd edition was printed in 2004 as a soft cover book that used the Silhouette Core Rules. Thus, unlike the first edition, it was not a complete game and needed the Silhouette CORE Rulebook to play. The second edition moved the setting from Vimary to Capal (another city), advancing the history of the world by 15 years. It also finally revealed the whole course of the metaplot, allowing Gamemasters to weave their own stories rather than wait to find out how the world would change.

Since 2004, many of the Tribe 8 rulebooks and supplements books are available as PDF downloads on DrivethruRPG.

=== Publications ===
Title	Author(s)	Date	Pages	ISBN
Tribe 8: Rulebook	Philippe R. Boulle, Stéphane Brochu, Joshua Mosqueira-Asheim	1 January 1998	208	978-1896776231
Weaver's Screen and Assistant	Philippe R. Boulle, Michael Butler, Joshua Mosqueira-Asheim, Jean Carrières	1998	48	1-896776-38-8
Vimary Sourcebook	Joshua Mosqueira Asheim, Lucien Soulban	1 November 1998	144	978-1896776415
Tribe 8: Companion	Phil Anderson	1999	112	978-1896776477
Horrors of the Z'Bri	Zak Arntson	November 1999	128	978-1896776576
Into the Outlands	Guy-Francis Vella	1 December 1999	96	978-1896776620
Word of the Pillars	Michael Butler, Edwyn Kumar	1999	80	978-1896776552
Word from the North	Edwyn Kumar	1999	62	1-896776-69-8
Children of Lilith	Jim Cotsios, Jason P. Prince	1999	96	1-896776-44-2
Trial by Fire	Jon Dawes, Edwyn Kumar	1999	112	1-896776-65-5
Word of the Fates	Christopher J. Gunning, David M. Jacobs, Jason P. Prince	2000	128	1-896776-77-9
Warrior Unbound	Christopher J. Gunning	2000	96	1-896776-71-X
Broken Pact	Jason P. Prince	2000	96	1-896776-79-5
Vimary Burns	Conan D. T. McKegg	2000	64	1-896776-83-3
Adrift on the River of Dream	Joshua Bishop-Roby, Lisa A. Nichols, Bradley "Brand" Robins	2001	144	978-1894578615
Revanche	Laura Bishop, Lisa A. Nichols, Bradley "Brand" Robins, Joshua Roby, Moyra Turkington	2001	64	1-894578-56-2
Liberation	Joshua Bishop-Roby, Laura Bishop-Roby, Hilary Doda, Lisa A. Nichols, Bradley "Brand" Robins, Moyra Turkington, Gary Winchester	2001	112	1-894578-67-8
Harvest of Thorns	Lisa A Nicols, Bradley Robins	2001	64	1-896776-99-X
Word of the Dancers	Laura Bishop-Roby, Bradley Robins, Moyra Turkington	2001	96	1-894578-52-X
Tribe 8 Player's Handbook	Marc A. Vezina	2002	128	978-1894814768
Capal Book of Days	Joshua Bishop-Roby, Laura Bishop-Roby, Hilary Doda, Lisa A. Nichols, Jason P. Prince, Bradley "Brand" Robins, Moyra Turkington	2002	112	1-894578-69-4
Tribe 8 RPG 2nd Edition Players Handbook	Bob Woods	2004	256	978-1894814904

== Rule system ==
Tribe 8 uses Dream Pod 9's own Silhouette game engine. The latest edition of the Silhouette rules is sold separately as a book titled Silhouette CORE Rulebook, which is needed to play the second edition of the Tribe 8 roleplaying game (the first edition rulebook included its own version of Silhouette).

Silhouette is a realistic, simulationist system that defines characters in terms of 10 base attributes (agility, knowledge, etc.), five derived attributes (health, etc.), and a variety of skills. Skill rolls make up the backbone of the system, which focuses on effect-based speed of play over grainy detail. The core mechanic involves rolling a number of 6-sided dice, taking the highest result and comparing it to a set threshold number. If the result is higher than the threshold the test is a success; if it is lower the test is a failure. The margin by which the test succeeded (Margin of Success, MoS) or failed (Margin of Failure, MoF) helps to determine the final outcome. Combat is handled by the same system, with characters taking penalty-inflicting wounds rather than depleting a set number of health points. As a result, the system can be lethal, especially on inexperienced characters.

== Reception ==
According to Shannon Appelcline: "The game was very well received for its combination of evocative setting, interesting metastory and non-linear play. The simplicity of the Silhouette system also continued to be lauded. [...] Some of the sourcebooks were quite well received, such as the Vimary Sourcebook (1998), which provided a description of post-apocalyptic Montreal and is recognised as one of the industry’s top-rated setting books."

The November 1998 issue of Pyramid reported that "Tribe 8 - the newest game release from Dream Pod 9, is an innovative post-apocalyptic Earth. Summed up in the phrase 'The Past is Dead, Your Future Begins Now,' Tribe 8 deals with the possibilities of what is to come, rather than dwelling on what has happened. The core book offers a complete world and system to immediately begin gaming. The book opens solidly, with the prophecies and words of the leaders and people who inhabit the island of 'Vimary,' the detailed setting of Tribe 8. The world is rich and textured, coming alive as you follow the confessions and tales, and you learn of the many and varied elements of Vimary through the seamless prose. The illustrations, surprisingly, coincide with the writing and are of professional quality. Definite eye candy! By the time you complete the first half of the main rule book, you'll be completely immersed in the atmosphere of the game. Tribe 8 centers around the Fallen, individuals who have questioned the status quo and have subsequently been exiled. This is where the characters begin play, having recently been stripped of family, clan, and tribe. Character creation is fun and set up in steps, helping the player complete a fully realized, three dimensional person".

== Reviews ==
- Backstab #46
