= Heavy Gear =

Tabletop role-playing game and video game

Heavy Gear is a mecha science fiction game universe published since 1994 by Canadian publisher Dream Pod 9. It includes a tabletop tactical wargame, a role-playing game, and a combat card game (Heavy Gear Fighter). The setting is also known through the PC game incarnations published by Activision in 1997 and 1999, which were developed after Activision lost the rights to the Battletech/MechWarrior series. It also spawned a 40-episode, 3D-animated TV series in 2001, which featured a much simplified version of the universe developed in the role-playing game.

The background universe of the game is very detailed – more than a hundred books and game accessories have been published since 1994. A continual epic storyline runs throughout all of the game's material, with new publications moving chronologically along the timeline. The game is best known for its humanoid combat vehicles (or mecha) – the Gears and Striders used by the military forces in the setting.

== Development ==
After Gen Con 1993, the game designers at Dream Pod 9 decided that they wanted to design a game system that they could use to publish their own books; this led to the Silhouette System which would be first used for Heavy Gear.

== Plot and gameplay ==
Characters, machines, creatures, and artifacts in the Heavy Gear universe

Heavy Gear is set on a distant, fictional planet called Terra Nova around 4,000 years from now (AD 6132). Terra Nova was once the pride of the United Earth Government's colonies. However, an economic collapse forced the UEG to abandon Terra Nova and its other colonies centuries before the period depicted in the game setting. This results in Terra Nova suffering a Dark Age. Eventually, city-states rose from the ashes, and either through treaties or tyranny, unite together to form nations called Leagues. These Leagues would in turn ally (again either peacefully or forcibly) to form the superpower blocs that dominated the temperate southern and northern hemispheres of the planet.

The planet's geography is composed primarily of land that contain deep underground water reserves, but few large bodies of open water, and no oceans. The planet has its own existing ecosystem of plants and animals, such as the bison-like animal called the Barnaby which is used as livestock, and the Hopper, which is the equivalent of Earth's rabbit, though most animals are reptilian in nature. The single dominant land feature is a massive mineral rich, hot desert belt around the equator of the world known as the Badlands. This territory is not dominated by any one political group, and is considered open territory to everyone, and contains many bandit groups known as Rovers. Most people live in the northern or southern polar regions where temperatures are more acceptable to human life, and other terrain types such as forests, grasslands, swamps, and jungles can be found. Small ice caps with arctic conditions and glaciers are found on the true north and true south poles. The planet has very little axial tilt, so seasonal weather differences are small to non existent.

As the setting is primarily the backdrop for a series of strategy, roleplaying, and video games the military and their weaponry are the main focus. One of the most popular weapon systems of the various groups on Terra Nova are machines known as Heavy Gears that give the universe its name. They are 12- to 20-foot-tall (3.7 to 6.1 m) bipedal, armored, single occupancy military combat units. The Gears are less heavily armed and armored than main battle tanks used by the Terra Nova armies. However, the Gears provide a mix of capabilities that prove effective as the setting/game rules typically allow victory through maneuver warfare and place less emphasis on raw firepower and armor.

Several major wars take place over time, including the War of the Alliance where Terra Nova unites against a new dictatorial government on Earth that attempts to re-take its former colonies by force. Earth is using its own advanced war machines such as hover tanks and armies of purple skinned GREL super soldiers (Genetically Recombined Experimental Legionaries). In this war, both the North and the South cooperate to fight off the Colonial Expeditionary Force, which during their first defeat and withdrawal, abandon many personnel (both human and GREL). These former soldiers eventually settle Terra Nova and form their own city-state of Port Arthur in the equatorial badlands.

As of 6132 AD (TN 1936, local calendar), the Confederated Northern City-States (CNCS) and the Allied Southern Territories (AST) are recovering and rebuilding from the War of the Alliance. Despite the looming common threat posed by the eventual return of Earth's colonial armies, the polar superpowers have great fear and animosity for each other, an analogy of the real world NATO and Warsaw Pact, while the independent City-States of the Badlands simply try to survive the crossfire.

== Heavy Gears ==
The namesake machines of the universe setting are the Heavy Gears. They are 12- to 20-foot-tall (3.7 to 6.1 m) machines usually weighing between 5 and 12 tons, that resemble robotic humanoids. They seat a single pilot inside the chest and head unit. They provide a flexibility to the battlefield of Heavy Gear setting that make them more useful than most other units, though they do not dominate. They can traverse more difficult terrain faster, and change direction swifter than tanks, which is important to a setting that emphasizes mobility, and not just firepower.

They are powered by a unique hydrocarbon-burning piston engine called a V-engine, often mounted as a backpack. This is different from most science fiction settings, which use some form of nuclear power or a more obscure or invented power source. Confusingly, this V-engine is not the same design as a modern V-engine, but an alternative working design invented by students at the University of Colorado. The engine has two rotating cylindrical engine blocks with multiple chambers in each block. The blocks somewhat resemble large scale cylinders from a revolver handgun. The two rotating cylinders are set approximately 90 degrees from each other, and shared between each rotating block are several solid V-shaped rods that serve as pistons. As the blocks rotate inside static housings, openings in the sides of the rotating and static portions of the engine will line up and act as intake and exhaust ports, and electrical contact connections trigger the spark plugs. The rotation of the cylinder blocks is tapped for electrical power generation or directly for hydraulic pressure.

The weaponry of the Heavy Gear is usually lighter and less powerful than a main battle tank, as Gears themselves typically weigh only a fifth (or less) the weight of a tank. They typically have one automatic cannon carried as a Gear sized hand held assault rifle. They also typically have a shoulder mounted multiple-launch missile launcher rack, as well as a small anti-personnel fragmentation grenade launcher for use against infantry. However, variants of many machines, especially heavier models, can carry or mount a wide variety of weapons, such as heavy mortars, bazookas, guided missiles, larger hand-held grenade launchers, larger cannons or artillery, and even advanced directed energy weapons.

== Artwork and design ==
Cover of the Heavy Gear Blitz! Locked & Loaded rulebook

The Heavy Gear books are notable for their heavily illustrated content. Each book features highly detailed plans and cutaways of the machines, along with flags, insignias, maps and other visual information to help players' immersion. Most of the artwork was done by illustrator Ghislain Barbe, who was also responsible for the artwork of Jovian Chronicles, another Dream Pod 9 game. Although he left Dream Pod 9, Ghislain produced book covers for the Heavy Gear franchise until Heavy Gear Blitz! Locked & Loaded. Currently, artwork is provided by a team of individuals.

The main themes of many artworks are the Heavy Gears themselves, with distinctive backpacks for the V-engine, single 'eye' head units, and at least a small area of the machine painted with an alternating yellow and black warning stripe paint scheme.

== Rules ==
All editions of Heavy Gear use some variation of Dream Pod 9's own Silhouette game system. The first and second editions of the game contain both Role-playing and Tactical Wargame Rules. "Tactical" Heavy Gear calls for the use of hex maps and paper counters or miniatures.

The third edition of the Heavy Gear RPG uses a separate Silhouette CORE Rulebook, which is needed for play. The Heavy Gear 3rd Edition book contains useful summaries from many 2nd edition products, combined with some detailed statistics for both the SilCORE and OGL D20 systems.

Heavy Gear: Blitz! Locked & Loaded is the most recent Heavy Gear: Blitz! rulebook, the first of which was released concurrently in 2006 with a new line of miniatures. It contains no role-playing material and is styled as a dedicated wargame; it contains a streamlined rule system, an innovative new army building system, complete army lists and background information for five factions, a basic campaign system, a painting guide, and a timeline of historic events in the Heavy Gear universe. The Heavy Gear: Blitz! rules are intended for use with 1:144 scale model terrain, but it is still possible to use hexed mapsheets and paper counters.

The Heavy Gear Blitz! ruleset was a nominee for the 2007 Origins Award for Best Miniatures Game or Expansion of the Year.

In May, 2009, Dream Pod 9 released "Return to Cat's Eye", the first expansion book for Heavy Gear Blitz!, which provides background information and army lists for three new armies.

=== Silhouette CORE RPG Rules ===
The Silhouette RPG, known in later editions as SilCORE is a simulationist system that defines characters in terms of 10 base attributes (agility, knowledge, etc.), 5 derived attributes (health, etc.), and a variety of skills. Skill rolls make up the "backbone" of the system, while basic and derived Attributes serve as modifiers to the roll.

The task resolution and tests involve rolling a number of 6-sided dice, taking the highest result, adding in modifiers for attributes and/or situation, and then comparing it to a set threshold number. If the result is higher than the threshold the test is a success; if it is lower the test is a failure. The margin by which the test succeeded (Margin of Success, MoS) or failed (Margin of Failure, MoF) helps to determine the outcome. Characters may suffer penalty-inflicting wounds rather than depleting a set number of health points.

Some players regard the system as particularly lethal, especially for inexperienced characters. A variety of optional rules are available in the SilCORE rulebook to mitigate this lethality.

DP9 ceased producing RPGs between 2006 and 2008 for their entire game catalog, including Heavy Gear.

On August 27, 2008, Steve Jackson Games announced that they had entered into an agreement with Dream Pod 9 to produce a fourth edition of a Heavy Gear roleplaying game. The project never got past the planning stages, however, and on August 9, 2010, Steve Jackson Games announced that they were relinquishing the rights to Heavy Gear back to DP9.

Dream Pod 9 announced that they would produce a fourth edition of a Heavy Gear RPG themselves, with a tentative release date of late 2011. This edition was not published.

In May 2023, Dream Pod 9 announced the coming of the official 4th edition rules for Heavy Gear, funded by crowdfunding to raise money for production and art costs. The project was fully funded and plans for a Q4, 2023 release are still in place. This marks the first new product for the Heavy Gear RPG line since production ceased in 2008. This new edition is reported to be compatible with Dream Pod 9's Heavy Gear Blitz! miniatures game as well as being backwards compatible with all Heavy Gear 2nd Edition rulebooks.

=== Heavy Gear 20th Anniversary Edition ===
On March 5, 2014, Dream Pod 9 announced that a new Heavy Gear RPG would be produced by Arkrite Press LLC, which is co-owned by Dream Pod 9 staff members.

== Heavy Gear Fighter ==
Heavy Gear Fighter is a stand-alone two-player card game set in the Heavy Gear universe. It was published by Dream Pod 9 in 1994, and is currently out of print.

== Miniatures ==
Heavy Gear has had three successive lines of wargaming miniatures starting with the RAFM produced 1:87 scale line, then the in-house produced 1:144 scale Tactical Rules and varying scale Fleet line, and the current 1:144 scale resculpted line for Heavy Gear: Blitz!

The 1:87 scale RAFM line was launched in 1995. The miniatures were largely cast in lead until public safety concerns, originally raised in 1993, influenced the gaming industry to cast lead-free miniatures. The price increase from the adoption of lead-free pewter made Dream Pod 9 reconsider the size and scale of their miniatures. As a result, the RAFM line of Heavy Gear miniatures was discontinued and never expanded beyond the Northern and Southern Terra Novan factions.

The 1:144 scale (12mm) Tactical Rules line was launched in 1997. It was largely the result of a desire to decrease the production cost inherent in lead-free, pewter miniatures. The Tactical Rules line was also developed with a greater attention to the control of proportions of the various Heavy Gear designs using computer-aided design illustrations as guides. The Heavy Gear miniature range was then expanded beyond the Northern and Southern factions to include designs from the Badlands and Colonial Earth Forces factions. The later Tactical Rules line miniatures were sculpted by Philippe Ferrier Le Clerc, who joined Dream Pod 9 in 2001. He also provided Heavy Gear limited edition resin miniatures through his boutique studio, Minimaniak.

During the same era as the Tactical Rules miniatures, Fleet Scale miniatures were also introduced which ranged from 1:350 scale for infantry, tanks, heavy gears, and striders to 1:3500 scale for landships.

The 1:144 scale (12mm) Heavy Gear: Blitz! line was launched in 2006. It preserved some of the Tactical Rules line miniatures for recasting. However, the majority of the Tactical Rules line miniatures will be resculpted. The intention of this change was that the miniatures bear a closer resemblance to the original hand drawn illustrations, that they have a greater range of possible poses, and that unit recognition is made easier for overall improved gameplay. In order to accomplish this, the difference in size between some miniatures has been exaggerated by approximately 10% and the miniatures are now cast on sprues, which allows many smaller, modular parts to be cast. Another effect of the Heavy Gear: Blitz! line of miniatures has been an appreciable increase in detail due to new sculpting and resin-master casting techniques. It has also produced the first new Heavy Gear designs in many years.

Fusion Models has also produced a 1:35 scale resin model of Heavy Gear's Kodiak heavy assault Gear.

== Video games ==
Faced with the loss of the BattleTech-MechWarrior property, Activision's Production Executive, Frank Evers (CEO), spearheaded the acquisition of the video game license in 1995. The first game, Heavy Gear, was released in 1997. The second game, Heavy Gear II, was made in 1999 for the Windows 98 operating system.

After years of the franchise laying dormant a licensing deal was announced on August 1, 2012, between Stompy Bot Productions and the owner of the franchise Dream Pod 9. A Kickstarter campaign for Heavy Gear Assault was launched but eventually cancelled in 2013. The game relaunched in 2015 in early access. The game is developed by MekTek Studios and published by Stompy Bot Productions for Windows and Linux. It's being developed with Epic Games' Unreal Engine 4 and was scheduled for a full release in 2018. As of 2020, Heavy Gear Assault is available for purchase on Steam, but, according to several reviews, the servers are no longer in operation, preventing the game from launching.

The third Heavy Gear game, Heavy Gear III, was announced to be in development on July 30, 2025 and is being developed by Canadian studio Flameborn Games.

== TV series ==
Heavy Gear: The Animated Series
- Based on: Heavy Gear by: Dream Pod 9; Pierre Ouellette
- Developed by: Mark Seidenberg; Mark Hoffmeier; Richard Raynis
- Voices of: Lukas Haas; Vanessa Estelle Williams; David DeLuise; Ed Hopkins; Clancy Brown; Clyde Kusatsu; Charles Shaughnessy; Greg Ellis; Karen Maruyama; Keith Szarabajka; Nicholas Guest; Jim Wise; Sarah Douglas; Tom Kane
- Theme music composer: Jim Latham
- Composers: Jim Latham; Wayne Boon
- Countries of origin: United States; Canada
- Original language: English
- No. of seasons: 1
- No. of episodes: 40

Production
- Executive producers: Chris Lee; Richard Raynis
- Producer: Mark Hoffmeier
- Running time: 22 minutes
- Production companies: Dream Pod 9 Paradox Entertainment; Mainframe Entertainment; Adelaide Productions; Columbia TriStar Domestic Television

Original release
- Network: Syndication
- Release: September 22, 2001 – 2002

In 2001, a computer-animated TV series titled Heavy Gear: The Animated Series was produced by Audu Paden at Mainframe Entertainment and Adelaide Productions for Columbia TriStar Television. The series lasted 40 episodes (though two of these were "recap" episodes and more still were clip shows). It played in syndication in various markets worldwide.

The Dream Pod 9 creative staff had very little input in the series' content, and the animated universe differs significantly from the game's. The show was aimed at an audience much younger than the one the property had previously targeted. The producers' original intent was to start the series with a mecha-combat tournament held between the villainous Vanguard of Justice and the honorable Shadow Dragons (representatives of Terra Nova's Northern and Southern armies respectively), but after the resolution of the tournament storyline rising tensions would lead to war between the North and South, which would in turn be followed by an invasion from Earth trying to reconquer its old colony planet, forcing the North and South to join forces for their own survival. Worries that having the villains from the early episodes (the Vanguard characters) suddenly working with the heroes, and shifting from a tournament-styled competition to all-out mecha warfare would have been too confusing for their targeted age group led to a decision to not use the war storyline. What ended up happening on was that they ran the tournament storyline as planned, but even though the tournament had been 'won' within the first dozen or so episodes, the two teams just kept having exhibition matches for the remainder of the 40-episode run. The series starred the voices of Lukas Haas, Vanessa Estelle Williams, David DeLuise, Ed Hopkins, Clancy Brown, and Clyde Kusatsu with Charles Shaughnessy, Greg Ellis, Karen Maruyama, Keith Szarabajka, Nicholas Guest, Jim Wise, Sarah Douglas, and Tom Kane.

The "in-universe" explanation for the difference between the universes is that the animated series is a Terra Novan entertainment program not unlike real-world professional wrestling.

In 2002, Heavy Gear: The Animated Series was nominated for a Golden Reel Award for Best Sound Editing in Television Animation.

DVD releases include two volumes released in North America in 2002 by Columbia TriStar Home Entertainment each with five episodes edited together into "feature length" stories. 2004 saw a release in the UK of a two disc Season One set including both "feature length" stories and three standalone episodes which collectively present the first thirteen episodes of the series in one form or other, but lacks the bonus content present on the North American releases. Also in 2004 Anchor Bay issued a single disc release in Canada with another five episodes from later in the series.

The entire series was formerly available for streaming for free in the US and Canada on Sony owned Crackle. It was also formerly available for streaming in Canada on Netflix.

The episodes were originally produced in widescreen and presented as such on the DVD releases, while most syndication broadcasts were of a cropped pan and scan version of each episode. The streaming versions formerly available from Crackle and Netflix were also of these pan and scan versions.

== Reception ==
In the February 1998 edition of Dragon, Rick Swan admired the "Silhouette" game system for character creation, "the smartest set of universal rules this side of the GURPS game." He also criticized the "downright dismal" setting and the paucity of information about its history. "Heavy Gear purports to tell the tale of the aftermath of the War of the Alliance, when Terra Nova was invaded by Imperial Earth. But there's next to nothing about the history of the war or the effect on the participants. And don't expect much about politics, culture, or economics. Put it this way: the entire 'World of Heavy Gear' chapter fills only six pages." He concluded with an ambivalent shrug: "Other than the lifeless settings, I couldn't find anything seriously wrong with Heavy Gear... But I couldn't find much to be excited about either."

In Issue 13 of Arcane, Jim Swallow reviewed Heavy Gear Duellist's Handbook, and commented that "There's plenty of source material for campaigns, with data on NPCs. locations and the welcome addition of more maps." Although Swallow gave the game a below-average rating of 6 out of 10, he concluded, "This is certainly a good place to begin a Heavy Gear game."

== Reviews ==
- Shadis #48 (June, 1998)
- Backstab #6
- Backstab #8
- InQuest Gamer #36 (2nd Edition)
- Casus Belli #93
- Backstab #30
- Pyramid (Issue 26 - Jul 1997)

== Publications ==
- Heavy Gear Fighter (1995), stock number ICF-02, card game which was released before the First Edition Rulebook.
- Heavy Gear Fighter: Weapons and Equipment (1995), stock number ICF-03, card game expansion pack.
- Heavy Gear Fighter: Booster I Card Set (1995), stock number not available, card game expansion pack.
- First Edition Rulebook (July 1995), first and second printings stock number ISG-001 (ISBN 2-921573-26-1), later printings stock number DP9-001 (ISBN 1-896776-05-1), rulebook which combined roleplaying and wargaming rules, and an early version of the game's Vehicle Construction System rules to create new Gears and conventional vehicles.
- Operation Jungle Drums (October 1995), stock number ISG-06, ISBN 2-921573-30-X, introductory adventure featuring both roleplaying and Tactical game material.
- Field Guide: Northern Vehicles 1 (December 1995), stock number DP9-009, ISBN 2-921573-28-8, expansion module with additional Gears and weapons options for the Northern faction on Terra Nova. Includes full-color counters showing the Gears in the book, for use in tabletop play.
- Field Guide: Southern Vehicles 1 (December 1995), stock number DP9-010, ISBN 2-921573-31-8, expansion module with additional Gears and weapons options for the Southern faction on Terra Nova. Includes full-color counters showing the Gears in the book, for use in tabletop play.
- First Edition Gamemaster's Screen and Counters (1996), stock number DP9-020, trifold screen for Gamemaster and full-color counters for use in tabletop play.
- Life on Terra Nova (January 1996), stock number DP9-002, ISBN 1-896776-00-0, world sourcebook for Terra Nova, the primary setting for the game.
- Into The Badlands (March 1996), stock number DP9-018, ISBN 1-896776-02-7, regional sourcebook for the Badlands, the equatorial region of Terra Nova.
- Field Guide: Northern Vehicles 2 (April 1996), stock number DP9-012, ISBN 1-896776-01-9, expansion module with additional Gears, conventional vehicles and weapons options for the Northern faction on Terra Nova. Includes full-color counters showing the Gears and vehicles in the book, for use in tabletop play.
- Field Guide: Southern Vehicles 2 (April 1996), stock number DP9-013, ISBN 1-896776-03-5, expansion module with additional Gears, conventional vehicles and weapons options for the Southern faction on Terra Nova. Includes full-color counters showing the Gears and vehicles in the book, for use in tabletop play.
- Tactical Air Support (May 1996), stock number DP9-008, ISBN 1-896776-04-3, new rules and background to include aircraft in Heavy Gear games. Includes additional rules for the First Edition Vehicle Construction system, which were replaced with the rules in the Second Edition Technical Manual.
- Technical Manual (July 1996), stock number DP9-004, ISBN 1-896776-06-X, sourcebook describing the weapons and technology of the Heavy Gear universe.
- Duelist's Handbook (August 1996), stock number DP9-005, ISBN 1-896776-07-8, sourcebook describing the gladiatorial sport of Dueling. Includes roleplaying and Tactical game material.
- Character Compendium 1 (September 1996), stock number DP9-021, ISBN 978-1-896776-08-8, character sourcebook featuring influential and noteworthy characters and groups from around Terra Nova.
- Tactical Field Support: Artillery & Ground Warfare (October 1996), stock number DP9-016, ISBN 1-896776-10-8, sourcebook with new rules for minefields, artillery support and morale, along with new weapons options.
- Southern Army List One: Southern Republic (November 1996), stock number DP9-024, ISBN 1-896776-09-4, army sourcebook for the Southern Republican Army with new and expanded roleplaying and Tactical game material. Though it is labeled "Southern Army List One," no other books were published in this format.
- Northern Vehicles Compendium One: Gears & Striders (December 1996), stock number DP9-025, ISBN 1-896776-11-6, sourcebook featuring additional Gears and weapons options for the Northern faction on Terra Nova. The Vehicle Compendiums expand on the material included in the earlier Field Guides, and feature many new designs.
- Southern Vehicles Compendium One: Gears & Striders (January 1997), stock number DP9-026, ISBN 1-896776-12-4, sourcebook featuring additional Gears and weapons options for the Southern faction on Terra Nova.
- Northern Record Sheets One: Gears & Striders' (February 1997), stock number DP9-027, ISBN 1-896776-14-0, set of Tactical game record sheets for the vehicles described in Northern Vehicle Compendium One.
- Southern Record Sheets One: Gears & Striders (February 1997), stock number DP9-028, ISBN 1-896776-15-9, set of Tactical game record sheets for the vehicles described in Southern Vehicle Compendium One.
- CNCS (Northern) Leaguebook One: Northern Lights Confederacy (May 1997), stock number DP9-030, ISBN 1-896776-16-7, regional sourcebook.
- Southern Leaguebook One: Southern Republic (August 1997), stock number DP9-031, ISBN 1-896776-19-1, regional sourcebook.
- The New Breed: Battle Before The Storm (September 1997), stock number DP9-035, ISBN 1-896776-20-5, campaign sourcebook which tied into the Heavy Gear PC game produced by Activision.
- Heavy Gear Design Works: The Making of a Universe (November 1997), stock number DP9-037, ISBN 1-896776-31-0, contains artworks examples for the Heavy Gear line, from early development through the First Edition.
- Storyline Book One: Crisis of Faith (November 1997), stock number DP9-033, ISBN 1-896776-21-3, the first book detailing DP9's published metaplot for Heavy Gear, from TN 1933 to TN 1935.
- Second Edition Rulebook (December 1997), stock number DP9-101, ISBN 1-896776-32-9, updated rulebook with both roleplaying and wargaming rules. Available in both softcover and hardcover versions.
- Southern Leaguebook Two: Humanist Alliance (January 1998), stock number DP9-032, ISBN 1-896776-26-4, regional sourcebook.
- Northern Vehicles Compendium Two: Tanks & Artillery (February 1998), stock number DP9-038, ISBN 1-896776-29-9, sourcebook featuring additional conventional vehicles and weapons options for the Northern faction on Terra Nova. Includes Tactical game record sheets.
- Southern Vehicles Compendium Two: Tanks & Artillery (February 1998), stock number DP9-039, ISBN 1-896776-30-2, sourcebook featuring additional conventional vehicles and weapons options for the Southern faction on Terra Nova. Includes Tactical game record sheets.
- Gamemaster's Guide and Screen (March 1998), stock number DP9-103, ISBN 1-896776-34-5, trifold screen for Gamemasters and supplement with tips for running games.
- Campaign Setting Two: The Paxton Gambit (March 1998), stock number DP9-040, ISBN 1-896776-33-7, campaign sourcebook set in Peace River.
- Miniatures Rules and Campaigning (April 1998), stock number DP9-043, ISBN 1-896776-39-6, Tactical rules boxed set containing campaign guides, full-color maps and counters for tabletop play.
- Southern Leaguebook Three: Mekong Dominion (July 1998), stock number DP9-036, ISBN 1-896776-28-0, regional sourcebook.
- Terranovan Military Powers Book One: Northern Guard (August 1998), stock number DP9-046, ISBN 1-896776-37-X, army list sourcebook.
- Life on Terra Nova Second Edition (September 1998), stock number DP9-102, ISBN 1-896776-40-X, world sourcebook updated with new material to reflect the events in Storyline Book 1.
- Second Edition Technical Manual (December 1998), stock number DP9-104, ISBN 1-896776-43-4, includes material from the First Edition Technical Manual and an expanded version of the Vehicle Construction System rules.
- Tactical Pack One: Battle of Two Towers (December 1998), stock number DP9-050, ISBN 1-896776-42-6, expansion pack for the Tactical game rules. Includes full-color counters and maps.
- Storyline Book Two: Blood on The Wind (February 1999), stock number DP9-034, ISBN 1-896776-27-2, details DP9's published Heavy Gear metaplot from TN 1935 to TN 1939.
- Northern Leaguebook Two: United Mercantile Federation (March 1999), stock number DP9-051, ISBN 1-896776-46-9, regional sourcebook.
- Northern Leaguebook Three: Western Frontier Protectorate (March 1999), stock number DP9-052, ISBN 1-896776-53-1, regional sourcebook.
- Tactical Pack Two: Shadow War (March 1999), stock number DP9-054, ISBN 1-896776-48-5, expansion pack for the Tactical game rules. Includes full-color counters and maps.
- Southern Leaguebook Four: Eastern Sun Emirates (April 1999), stock number DP9-053, ISBN 1-896776-49-3, regional sourcebook.
- Armor Pack Volume One: Tanks and Striders (May 1999), stock number DP9-057, ISBN 1-896776-51-5, expansion pack for the Tactical game rules. Includes full-color counters.
- Terranovan Military Powers Book Two: Southern MILICIA (August 1999), stock number DP9-048, ISBN 1-896776-54-X, army list sourcebook.
- Tactical Pack Three: Operation Sudden Fire (October 1999), stock number DP9-055, ISBN 1-896776-58-2, expansion pack for the Tactical game rules. Includes full-color counters and maps.
- Storyline Book Three: Return to Cat's Eye (November 1999), stock number DP9-056, ISBN 1-896776-59-0, details DP9's published Heavy Gear metaplot from TN 1939 to TN 1941.
- Activision Game Companion: Black Talon - Mission to Caprice (January 2000), stock number DP9-059, ISBN 1-896776-63-9, campaign sourcebook which tied into the Heavy Gear 2 PC game produced by Activision.
- Tactical Space Support - Space Warfare (March 2000), stock number DP9-060, ISBN 1-896776-68-X, new rules and background material for fighting in space.
- Life on Caprice (April 2000), stock number DP9-047, ISBN 1-896776-66-3, world sourcebook for Caprice, a "hypercity" world first introduced in Activision Game Companion: Black Talon - Mission to Caprice.
- Tools and Weapons: Equipment Catalog (June 2000), stock number DP9-061, ISBN 1-896776-73-6, sourcebook featuring additional weapons and equipment for player characters.
- Storyline Book Four: Storm on the Horizon (August 2000), stock number DP9-062, ISBN 1-896776-74-4, details DP9's published Heavy Gear metaplot from TN 1941 to TN 1943.
- Caprice Book One: Corporate Sourcebook (September 2000), stock number DP9-063, ISBN 1-896776-78-7, sourcebook detailing the corporations which rule Caprice.
- Caprice Book Two: Liberati Sourcebook (October 2000), stock number DP9-064, ISBN 1-896776-80-9, sourcebook detailing the clans which inhabit the "highlands" of Caprice.
- Second Edition Duelist's Handbook (December 2000), stock number DP9-105, ISBN 1-896776-95-7, updated Dueling rules and background material.
- Tactical Miniatures Rules: The War Goes On (February 2001), stock number DP9-106, ISBN 1-896776-98-1, updated Tactical game rules featuring a condensed "datacard" record sheet for each Gear or vehicle.
- Earth Book One: Colonial Expeditionary Force (April 2001), stock number DP9-065, ISBN 1-894578-51-1, army sourcebook for the Colonial Expeditionary Force with roleplaying and Tactical game material.
- Miniatures Supplement: Raids & Raiders - Interstellar Strikes (June 2001), stock number DP9-107, ISBN 1-894578-55-4, additional Tactical game rules and background material for special forces units.
- Spaceship Compendium One: Ships of Terra Nova (July 2001), stock number DP9-066, ISBN 1-894578-57-0, sourcebook describing spacecraft and space facilities in use by the various factions on Terra Nova.
- Miniatures Supplement: Tactical Dueling - Arena Champions (October 2001), stock number DP9-108, ISBN 1-894578-62-7, rules for Dueling with Tactical game figures.
- Operation Jungle Drums Redux (November 2001), stock number DP9-109, ISBN 1-894814-07-X, updating of the original supplement for use with the Second Edition roleplaying rules and the "datacard" vehicle sheet format in Tactical Miniatures Rules.
- Storyline Book Five: Distant Shores (December 2001), stock number DP9-067, ISBN 1-894578-66-X, details DP9's published Heavy Gear metaplot from TN 1943 to TN 1948.
- Spaceship Compendium Two: Ships of The CEF (March 2002), stock number DP9-068, ISBN 1-894814-31-2, sourcebook describing spacecraft and space facilities in use by Earth and Caprice.
- Life on Atlantis (September 2002), stock number DP9-070, ISBN 1-894814-46-0, world sourcebook for Atlantis, a waterworld.
- Life on Utopia (April 2002), stock number DP9-069, ISBN 1-894814-38-X, world sourcebook for Utopia, a world devastated by nuclear war.
- Life on Eden (January 2003), stock number DP9-072, ISBN 1-894814-78-9, world sourcebook for Eden, a world recovering from a natural disaster.
- Heavy Gear Third Edition Player's Handbook (September 2003), stock number DP9-925, ISBN 1-894814-88-6, roleplaying game to be used with the Silhouette CORE rules, or the d20 OGL rules produced by Wizards of the Coast. Includes material from the Equipment Catalog.
- Heavy Gear Third Edition Earth Companion (December 2003), stock number DP9-926, ISBN 1-894814-91-6, an expanded and updated version of Earth Book One: Colonial Expeditionary Force to be used with the Silhouette CORE rules. Includes OGL-compatible statistics.
- Heavy Gear Third Edition Vehicle Companion (January 2004), stock number DP9-927, ISBN 1-897042-00-0, updates for the Silhouette CORE rules for Gears and vehicles from previous publications. Includes OGL-compatible statistics.
- Heavy Gear Third Edition Terra Nova Companion (March 2004), stock number DP9-928, ISBN 1-897042-02-7, a sourcebook for Terra Nova compiled from previous editions of Life on Terra Nova and the various Leaguebooks.
- Silhouette CORE Miniature Rules (July 2005), stock number DP9-919, ISBN 1-897042-01-9, tabletop wargaming rules for the Silhouette CORE edition. Includes Dueling and "fleet scale" rules for 1/350 scale miniatures.
- Heavy Gear Blitz! (August 2006), stock number DP9-996, ISBN 1-897042-39-6, new rules for tabletop wargaming play. HGB includes no roleplaying rules.
- Heavy Gear Blitz! Hammers of Faith (December 2006), stock number DP9-9031, ISBN 1-897042-48-5, army list book detailing rules and units in the Blitz! rules for the North.
- Heavy Gear Blitz! Swords of Pride (March 2007), stock number DP9-9032, ISBN 1-897042-92-2, army list book detailing rules and units in the Blitz! rules for the South.
- Heavy Gear Blitz! Shields of Freedom (December 2007), stock number DP9-9033, ISBN 1-897042-69-8, army list book detailing rules and units in the Blitz! rules for the Badlands.
- Heavy Gear Blitz! Locked and Loaded (May 2008), stock number DP9-9996c, ISBN 978-1-897460-92-4, updated version of the Blitz! rules. Includes new army lists.
- Heavy Gear Blitz! Black Talon - Return to Cat's Eye (May 2009), stock number DP9-9034, ISBN 978-1-897460-18-4, features new army lists and vehicles for the CEF and the local forces on Caprice.
- Heavy Gear Blitz! Field Manual - Core Book Revised (November 2011), stock number DP9-9997, ISBN 978-1-926790-54-1, update of the Blitz! rules.
- Heavy Gear Blitz! Perfect Storm - NuCoal Field Guide (November 2011), stock number DP9-9191, ISBN 978-1-926790-30-5, features new army lists and vehicles for the NuCoal faction.
- Heavy Gear Blitz! Forged In Fire - Southern Field Guide (December 2012), stock number DP99266e, ISBN 978-1-927334-59-1, features new army lists and vehicles for the Southern factions.
