= Dream Pod 9 =

Canadian publisher of tabletop games

Dream Pod 9 (DP9), formerly Ianus Games, is a Montreal-based Canadian game publisher. Its most notable products are Heavy Gear, Jovian Chronicles, Tribe 8, and Gear Krieg, as well as the Silhouette role-playing game system.

== History ==
=== Ianus ===
In 1987, Montreal-based Ianus Publications was licensed by Harmony Gold to publish Protoculture Addicts, a quarterly magazine dedicated to the Robotech TV series. In 1989, Ianus relinquished the Robotech license so that they could turn Protoculture Addicts, into a bi-monthly magazine with an industry-wide focus; it became the first large mainstream anime and manga magazine in North America. In 1991, Ianus began publishing the mecha-inspired Mecha Press.

The following year, Ianus and R. Talsorian Games (RTG) struck a deal to develop a series of products set in an alternate reality based on RTG's successful game Cyberpunk 2020. The Ianus design team working on this project became known in-house as Dream Pod 9, and within three years had produced 15 various rulebooks and adventure modules.

In 1993 the Dream Pod 9 design team then created Jovian Chronicles, a new setting for RTG's Mekton II roleplaying game. In 1993, the same design team was hired by Palladium Books to work on supplementary deck plans of the Macross II roleplaying game. The design team, under license from RTG, also created the comedy sf game Star Riders using the rules system from RTG's Teenagers from Outer Space roleplaying game. This also resulted in a three-part comic book anthology in Dark Horse Presents.

In 1994, the Dream Pod 9 team developed a card game called Heavy Gear Fighter, their first in-house project, and started to develop a game called Project A-ko: The Roleplaying Game based on the anime movie Project A-ko, as well as a roleplaying game system. They also released Video Fighter: Dragons of Fury in 1995.

=== Dream Pod 9 ===
In 1995, the Dream Pod 9 team released the first edition of Heavy Gear, their first roleplaying and combat game that used the design team's roleplaying game system called "Silhouette", and started using a "Dream Pod 9" logo to identify their work. In December 1995, after experiencing strong growth in both the magazine business and the games division, Ianus decided to split into two ventures: Protoculture, which continued to publish Protoculture Addicts; and a completely independent game publisher, Dream Pod 9, which would design and market miniatures and gaming books. Mecha (giant robots) would be the focus of Dream Pod 9.

==== Silhouette game system ====
The Silhouette game system was developed by Dream Pod 9 specifically to work with both its mecha-based miniatures combat games and roleplaying adventures. As Moby Games summarized it: "This new addition in the world of giant robots (mecha) gaming not only introduced realistic warfare game mechanics to the hobby, but gave North Americans what they have been waiting for since they were introduced to the world of mecha warfare in the early eighties: a story that is both vivid and entertaining, and designs which are made by North Americans for North Americans."

Rick Swan wrote, in Dragon #244 (1998), "I do, however, like the system, one of the smartest set of universal rules this side of the GURPS* game. Called Silhouette, the system uses 6-sided dice to generate quick and sensible results. All skills are rated from a low of 0 (little or no aptitude) to 5 (superhuman aptitude). Actions are assigned thresholds of difficulty, ranging from 1 (effortless) to 12 (near-impossible). When a PC attempts an action, the gamemaster assigns a threshold and determines the relevant skill. The player rolls a number of dice equal to the skill level. The results are not added together. Instead, the highest number rolled on an individual die is considered the outcome (if a player rolls two dice and gets a 2 and a 5, the outcome is 5). Every additional 6 adds 1 to the total (if he gets two 6s, the outcome is 7). If all of the dice show 1s, the PC suffers a critical mishap. Actions with higher thresholds, then, become increasingly difficult to achieve. PCs with low skill levels are more likely to fumble then their high-level counterparts. It’s a clever, elegant system, a snap to learn and adjudicate. Character creation is equally smooth, involving the purchase of attributes (Agility, Build, Perception) and skills (Acrobatics, Law, Stealth) from a pool of character points. Simple formulas are used to compute secondary traits (Strength, Stamina, Health). Creating a PC from scratch takes half an hour, tops".

RPGGeek wrote that "the system is based upon rolling multiple d6s and the results exaggerate the effect either way. A big success roll results in highly positive effects, a bad roll means you suffer more damage for example. There were three editions of the system, with Dream Pod 9 bringing out a Silhouette Core rules book to enable all their games to be run from one system". In 2003, Dream Pod 9 released a conversion guide from the Silhouette game system to the d20 Open Gaming License.

=== Heavy Gear ===
In 1996, Dream Pod 9 partnered with Activision to create a Heavy Gear computer game, and the following year, Heavy Gear: The New Breed became Activision's first property to sell over a million copies. At the height of Dream Pod 9's popularity in the late 1990s, despite having a staff of only nine writers, Heavy Gear was reportedly the fourth-most popular roleplaying game in the U.S.

In 1997, Dream Pod 9 released the second edition rules for Heavy Gear, again using the Silhouette game system.

In 1998, Dream Pod 9 released their next major property, Jovian Chronicles, a rewrite of the setting they had created for the Mekton II RPG in 1993, now adapted to their own Silhouette game system. The company then published the post-apocalyptic fantasy role-playing game Tribe 8 (1998), and then its fourth role-playing game Gear Krieg (2001), set in an alternate-history World War II.

In 1999, Dream Pod 9 licensed Heavy Gear to Sony Pictures, which resulted in a 40-episode 3D-animated series that had world-wide syndication. In 2002, Heavy Gear: The Animated Series was nominated for a Golden Reel Award for Best Sound Editing in Television Animation.

=== Decline ===
In 1999, Activision's Heavy Gear II: Black Talon was commercially unsuccessful, selling less than 30,000 copies by the end of the year; Activision chose not to develop a third title.

By 2001, sales of Dream Pod 9's Silhouette-based games also declined as the d20 system became popular throughout the role-playing game industry. Dream Pod 9 responded by releasing a third edition of the Heavy Gear roleplaying game in 1993 that had been converted to the d20 system under the Open Game License (OGL). Since this edition could not include game system rules under the terms of the d20 System Trademark License, players had to purchase the Players Handbook for the 3rd edition of Dungeons & Dragons in order to play the game. For players who still wanted to use the Silhouette rules system, Dream Pod 9 also published the Silhouette CORE Rulebook (SilCORE), which contained the Silhouette rules system; conversely, it also explained how to convert previous editions of their games that used the Silhouette system to d20 rules. Regardless of which system players wanted to use, they still had to purchase two books in order to play the third edition of Heavy Gear. Sales of both products were low, and in 2004 the company ended its role-playing game production to concentrate on their miniatures combat games.

The company then created Dream Pod Entertainment to bring the company into movies and television, including work on the 2004 film Eternal with Caroline Néron and the 2007 film 300, and used this movie industry money to help fund production of Heavy Gear Blitz!, a mecha miniatures game, which was nominated for a 2007 Origins Award in the category of "Miniatures Game or Expansion of the Year". Dream Pod 9 was nominated for two ENnie Awards, "Best Miniature Product" and "Best Electronic Book", in 2008.

In 2008, Dream Pod 9 licensed the rights to Heavy Gear to Steve Jackson Games, which wanted to create a fourth edition Heavy Gear roleplaying game based on the GURPS rule system; ultimately Steve Jackson Games decided to shelve the project, and in 2010 relinquished their rights to the game.

After that decision, when an interviewer asked Dream Pod 9 company president Robert Dubois which of the three versions of Heavy Gear players should use, he replied, "The second edition of the Heavy Gear Roleplaying Game is the best version of the RPG and has the most support in material." In the same interview, Dubois also revealed that the design team was working on a fourth edition that would be a revision of the second edition, not as a roleplaying game but as a combat game compatible with the miniatures game Heavy Gear Blitz!; to date, it has not been published.

In 2012, Dream Pod 9 announced a five-year partnership with Stompy Bot Productions (now BlocPlay Entertainment) to commercialize Heavy Gear; in 2017, the two companies renewed the partnership for a further five years, with plans to include sponsorship of eSports tournamaents.

In 2013, Dream Pod 9 was nominated for an Origins Award in the category of "Best Miniatures Rules" for Heavy Gear Blitz! Perfect Storm: The NuCoal Field Guide.

In 2015, Heavy Gear Blitz! Tabletop Wargaming - Living Rulebook was released for free on DrivethruRPG as a PDF. In the following year, Heavy Gear Blitz! Tabletop Wargaming - Quick Start Rulebook was also released on DrivethruRPG. Both of these rulebooks were last updated on February 23, 2018.

In 2016, Beta Playtest Rules for a new edition of Jovian Chronicles, called Jovian Wars, were released for free on DrivethruRPG as a PDF. These rules were last updated on February 14, 2018.

==== Kickstarter ====
Between 2014 and 2018, Dream Pod 9 launched six Kickstarter campaigns - five campaigns were successfully funded. All of the campaigns focused on raising funds to create new miniatures for either Heavy Gear or Jovian Wars.

Campaign	Goal (CAD)	Date	Backers	Amount Raised (CAD)
Heavy Gear Blitz -War for Terra Nova- Miniatures Starter Set	27,000	11/22/2014	1,015	150,406
Jovian Wars - Resin Spaceship Miniatures	9,000	03/19/2017	143	25,090
Heavy Gear Blitz! Plastic Peace River, NuCoal & Utopia Minis	50,000	12/05/2017 - 01/06/2018	232	30,180
Heavy Gear Blitz! Utopia Armed Forces Plastic Miniatures	30,000	01/16/2018 - 02/03/2018	192	30,516
Heavy Gear Blitz! Peace River & NuCoal Plastic Miniatures	25,000	04/25/2018 - 05/26/2018	243	40,912
Jovian Wars Venus Forces Kickstarter	4,000	11/05/2018 - 12/03/2018	57	8,708

== Properties ==
The company is best known for a set of universes on which role-playing games, wargames, scale models and miniatures have been based:

- Heavy Gear is a military science-fiction universe where human worlds wage war against one another with mecha.
- Jovian Chronicles follows the exploration of the Solar System in the 23rd century and the conflicts that arise between the Earth and the space colonies.
- Tribe 8 is a tribal, post-apocalyptic fantasy game of horror and epic adventures.
- Gear Krieg takes place in an alternate reality World War II firmly set in the pulp genre.

A few other less well-known settings for use in various publications include CORE Command, a space opera universe set millennia in the future.

== Reviews ==
In the February 1998 edition of Dragon (Issue 244), Rick Swan reviewed two of Dream Pod 9's game settings, Heavy Gear and Jovian Chronicles. Swan praised the high production values of both settings, saying, "Both are beautiful games, into which a lot of effort has been invested". He also thought the Silhouette game system rules used in both was "a clever, elegant system, a snap to learn and adjudicate" and "the smartest set of universal rules this side of the GURPS game." But overall he found Dream Pod 9's work "lifeless" and focussed more on giant robots than roleplaying, saying their work "aims more at players interested in hardware than human beings."

== See also ==
- D20 Mecha Compendium
