= 1964 Gabonese coup d'état =

Military coup against President Léon M'ba

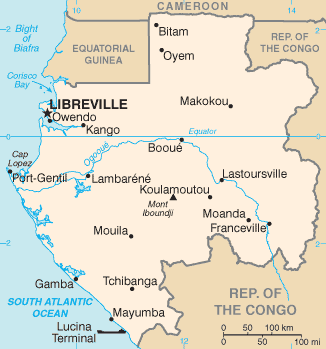
- Map of Gabon
Date	17 February 1964 (night) until 19 February 1964 (night)
Location	Gabon
Result	Provisional government toppled; Léon M'ba reinstated as president

The 1964 Gabonese coup d'état was staged between 17 and 19 February 1964 by Gabonese military officers who rose against Gabonese President Léon M'ba. Before the coup, Gabon was seen as one of the most politically stable countries in Africa. The coup resulted from M'ba's dissolution of the Gabonese legislature on 21 January 1964. During a takeover with few casualties, 150 coup plotters arrested M'ba and a number of his government officials. Through Radio Libreville, they asked the people of Gabon to remain calm and assured them that the country's pro-France foreign policy would remain unchanged. A provisional government was formed, and the coup's leaders installed Deputy Jean-Hilaire Aubame, who was M'ba's primary political opponent and had been uninvolved in the coup, as president. Meanwhile, M'ba was sent to Lambaréné, 250 kilometres (155 mi) from Libreville. There was no major uprising or reaction by the Gabonese people when they received word of the coup, which the military interpreted as a sign of approval.

After being informed of the coup by Gabonese Chief of Staff Albert-Bernard Bongo, French President Charles de Gaulle resolved to restore the M'ba government, honoring a 1960 treaty signed between the deposed government and France when Gabon became independent. With the help of French paratroopers, the provisional government was toppled during the night of 19 February and M'ba was reinstated as president. Afterward, M'ba imprisoned more than 150 of his opponents, pledging "no pardon or pity" but rather "total punishment". Aubame was sentenced to 10 years of hard labor and 10 years of exile, a sentence that was later commuted. During this time, the ageing president became increasingly reclusive, opting to stay in his presidential palace under the protection of French troops. Within three years, M'ba was diagnosed with cancer; he died on 28 November 1967.

== Background and origins ==
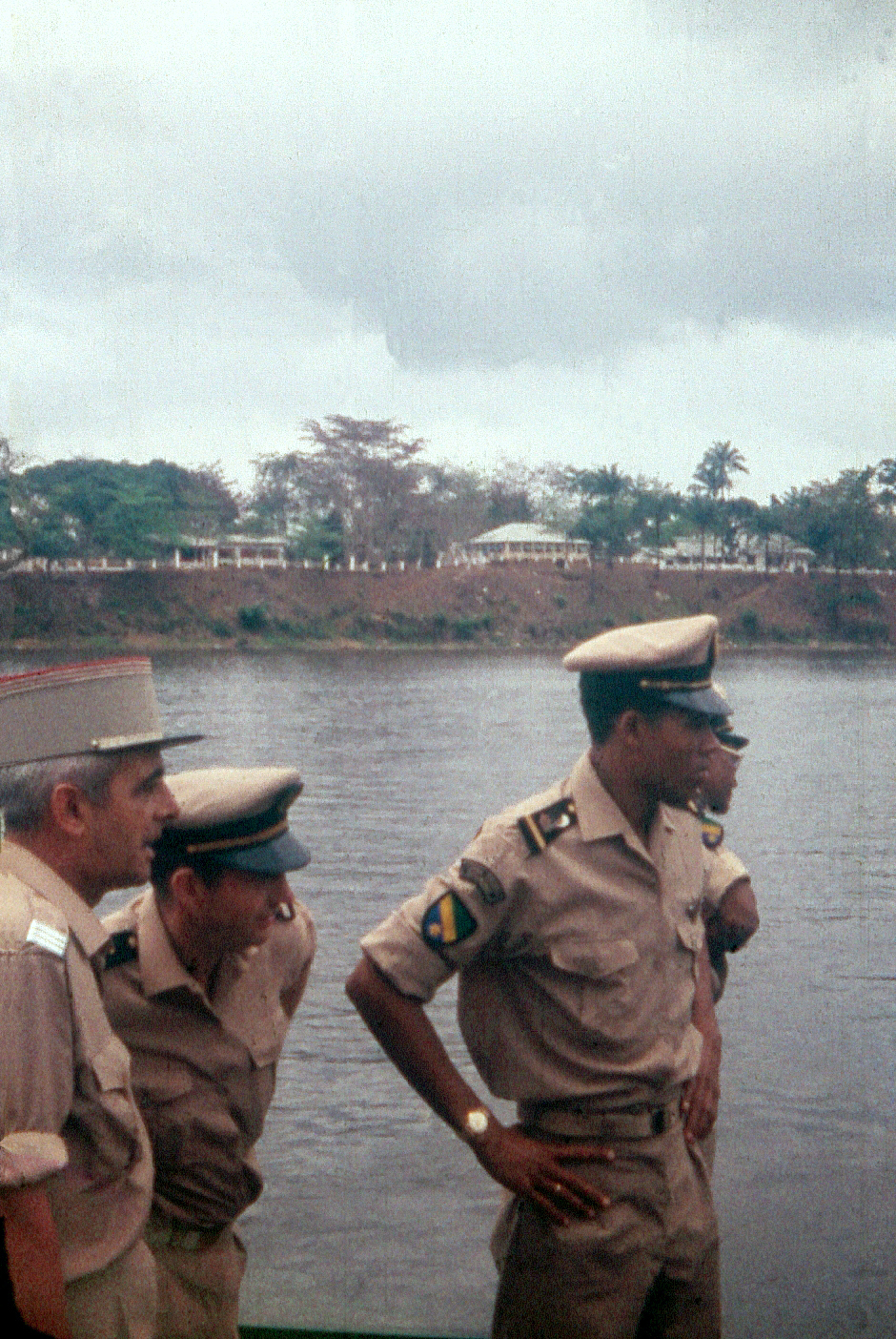
Gabonese and French military officers, 1959

Gabon gained its independence from France on 17 August 1960. The country had a relatively high standard of living and was considered one of the more stable countries in West Africa, both politically and economically. At the time of the coup, the country had an estimated US$200 average annual income and was one of the few countries in Africa with a positive trade balance, with exports exceeding imports by 30 percent. As of 1964, the country was among the largest producers of uranium and manganese in French Africa, which Time suggested was one of the reasons for France's response to the coup. It also had petroleum, iron, and logging interests stationed in Gabon.

Léon M'ba was one of the most loyal allies to France in Africa, even after the country's independence. In fact, France maintained 600 paratroopers and an air force unit, which included Mirage V and Jaguar jet fighters, at the Camp de Gaulle military base until at least 1987, a warning to any Gabonese coup plotters. M'ba famously commented during a 1961 visit to France that "[a]ll Gabonese have two fatherlands: France and Gabon",^{[a]} and Europeans enjoyed particularly friendly treatment under his regime. French journalist Pierre Péan asserted that M'ba secretly tried to prevent Gabonese independence; instead, he lobbied for it to become an overseas territory of France. He went so far as to say that "Gabon is an extreme case, verging on caricature, of neocolonialism."

M'ba aspired to establish Gabon as a democracy, which he believed was necessary to attract foreign investors. At the same time, he attempted to reconcile the imperatives of democracy with the necessity for a strong and coherent government. In practice, however, M'ba showed a weakness in attaining his goal—by this time he was known as "the old man", or "the boss"—to have a high degree of authority. On 21 February 1961, a new constitution was unanimously adopted, providing for a "hyperpresidential" regime. M'ba now had full executive powers: he could appoint ministers whose functions and responsibilities were decided by him; he could dissolve the National Assembly by choice or prolong its term beyond the normal five years; he could declare a state of emergency when he believed the need arose, though for this amendment he would have to consult the people via a referendum. This was, in fact, very similar to the constitution adopted in favor of Fulbert Youlou at roughly the same time. A report from the French secret service summarized the situation:

He regarded himself as a truly democratic leader; nothing irritated him more than being called a dictator. Still, [M'ba] wasn't happy until he had the constitution rewritten to give him virtually all power and transforming the parliament into high-priced scenery that could be bypassed as needed.^{[b]}

M'ba's chief political opponent had been Jean-Hilaire Aubame, a former protégé and his half-brother's foster son. M'ba was backed by the French forestry interests, while Aubame was supported by the Roman Catholic missions and the French administration. Aubame, a deputy of the opposition party l'Union démocratique et sociale gabonaise (UDSG) in the National Assembly, had few fundamental ideological differences with the M'ba-led Bloc Démocratique Gabonais (BDG), including advocating less economic dependence on France and faster "Africanization" of French political jobs. However, the new constitution and the National Union (a political union they founded) suspended the quarrels between M'ba and Aubame from 1961 to 1963. Despite this, political unrest grew within the population, and many students held demonstrations on the frequent dissolutions of the National Assembly and the general political attitude in the country. The president did not hesitate to enforce the law himself: with a chicotte, he whipped citizens who did not show respect for him, including passersby who "forgot" to salute him.

Aubame served as foreign minister under the coalition government, though in early 1963 he was dropped from the Cabinet for refusing to create a single-party Gabon. To oust Aubame from his legislative seat, M'ba appointed him President of the Supreme Court on 25 February, practically a powerless post. M'ba supporters tried to pass a bill that declared that a member of parliament could only hold a single role in government. The president claimed that Aubame had resigned from the National Assembly, citing incompatibility with the functions of the assembly. Aubame, however, unexpectedly resigned from the Supreme Court on 10 January 1964, complicating matters for M'ba. In a fit of rage, M'ba dissolved the National Assembly on 21 January 1964. The New York Times speculates that this was due to it not supporting M'ba in Aubame's removal.

The electoral conditions were announced as such: The election 67 districts were reduced to 47. M'ba disqualified Aubame by announcing that anyone who had held a post recently was banned. Any party would have to submit 47 candidates who had to pay US$160 or none at all. Thus, over US$7,500 would be deposited without considering campaign expenses. M'ba's idea was that no party other than his would have the money to enter candidates. In response to this, the opposition announced its refusal to participate in elections that they did not consider fair.

== Planning ==
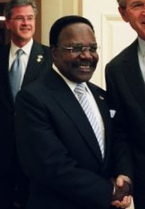
Bongo in 2004

Little is known of the planning of the coup. No demonstrations followed Mba's dissolution of the National Assembly, so the coup could be classified as simply a "palace coup". The 1964–1965 edition of the Adelphi Papers speculates that the continued presence of young French military officers in Gabon may have been an inspiration to the plotters of the coup. Much of the 600-man Gabonese army had previously served in the French army prior to independence, where they were paid modestly. Like much of the rest of the country, they were displeased by M'ba's actions against Aubame, a probable cause for involvement.

U.S. Ambassador to Gabon Charles Darlington suggested that the coup plotters may have tried to imitate the style of Colonel Christophe Soglo. Soglo, a commander in Dahomey's 800-man army, had deposed President Hubert Maga in October 1963, ruled for about a month, then resigned in favor of Dahomey's citizens. The plotters apparently did not consider French involvement, so therefore didn't take any additional steps to prevent it. They could have created protests to show public support, although the spokesman for the coup plotters, Sub-Lieutenant Daniel Mbene, justified the coup by claiming in a broadcast that the army had to act to avoid the rash of "uncontrollable demonstrations that would have been difficult to halt".

It is unlikely that Aubame participated in the planning of the coup. It appears that he joined the effort after being recruited by the new government. His nephew, Pierre Eyeguet, a former ambassador to the United Kingdom, may have known of the plot beforehand and notified his uncle, although it is unknown whether or not Aubame established contact with the plotters.

Lieutenant Valerie Essone only decided to participate on 17 February. This was a crucial decision for he led the First Company of the Gabonese Army, the company of the other officers. Apparently at that moment he told his troops to perform average night maneuvers. That day, Gabonese chief of staff Albert Bernard (later Omar) Bongo informed President M'ba that the number of troops outside Libreville was unusually high. M'ba, however, did not think much of this anomaly.

== Coup ==
During the night of 17 February and the early morning of 18 February 1964, 150 members of the Gabonese military, gendarmerie, and police, headed by Lieutenant Jacques Mombo and Valére Essone, seized the presidential palace. The gendarmes on duty claimed that this was but a military exercise. However, during the "exercise" the lieutenants dragged President M'ba from his bed at gunpoint. Bongo heard this noise and telephoned President of the National Assembly Louis Bigmann to find out what had happened. Bigmann arrived at the presidential palace and asked the rebels what Bongo had asked him. At this point they opened the gates and arrested him too. The plotters subsequently arrested every member of the Gabonese cabinet except the respected technician André Gustave Anguilé. Apparently, the plotters let him roam free in the hopes of him joining them, although before noon he asked to be arrested. Joseph N'Goua, the Gabonese minister of foreign affairs, was able to tell the French Embassy of this before he was arrested.

The insurgents, calling themselves a "revolutionary committee", spread themselves strategically across the Gabonese capital during the night. They shut down the airport and seized the post office and radio station. On Radio Libreville, the military announced that a coup had taken place and that they required "technical assistance". They issued radio statements every half-hour promising that "public liberties will be restored and all political prisoners will be freed" and ordered the French not to interfere in the matter, claiming that it would be a violation of their sovereignty. In addition, they decreed the closing of schools and businesses. M'ba acknowledged his defeat in a radio broadcast, in accordance with orders from his captors. "D-Day is here, the injustices are beyond measure, these people are patient, but their patience has limits", he said. "It came to a boil."^{[c]}

During these events, no gunshots were fired. The public did not react strongly, which, according to the military, was a sign of approval. A provisional government was formed, composed of civilian politicians from the UDSG and BDG such as Philippe N'dong, editor of Gabon's literary review Réalités Gabonaises; Dr. Eloi Chambrier, Gabon's only physician; Philippe Mory, a famous Gabonese actor; and civil servant Paul Gondjout. Mbene stated that the provisional government would not include any members of the M'ba government. He declared that Gabon's pro-French foreign policy would remain unchanged and that Mombo would supervise the government until the presidency was given to Aubame. The plotters were content to ensure security for civilians, urging them to remain calm and not hurt anyone. Most of them were junior officers, living in the army barracks. The senior officers did not intervene; instead, they stayed in their "pleasant" houses.

Aubame was unaware of the coup until the French ambassador to Gabon, Paul Cousseran, called him on the telephone roughly a half-hour after sunrise. Cousseran, meanwhile, was awoken by the noisy streets and checked to see what was happening. Aubame replied that he was to find out why there was "no government", as Cousseran never directly mentioned a coup. However, about midway through the morning an automobile carrying the revolutionary committee arrived at Aubame's residence and drove him to the governmental offices, where he had been named president.

Second Lieutenant Ndo Edou gave instructions to transfer M'ba to Ndjolé, Aubame's electoral stronghold. However, due to heavy rain, the deposed president and his captors took shelter in an unknown village. The next morning they decided to take him over the easier road to Lambaréné. Several hours later, they returned to Libreville.

=== French intervention ===
French authorities first received information on the coup not from Cousseran but rather from Bongo, giving him some standing among them. President de Gaulle, upon advice from his chief adviser on African policy, Jacques Foccart, decided that he would restore the legitimate government. This was in accordance with a 1960 treaty between Gabon and the French, which was signed by Aubame in his stint as Foreign Minister. Foccart, on the other hand, had only decided to launch the countercoup to protect the interests of the French petroleum group Elf, which operated in Gabon and was led by a close friend of his. M'ba was also a close friend of his; David Yates reports that M'ba could call Foccart personally, and Foccart would meet with him "at a moment's notice". French commentators, however, claimed that if they did not intervene, they would be tempting other dissidents. France had refrained from intervening in recent coups in the French Congo, Dahomey, and Togo, despite being opposed to all of them. However, the Gabon coup differed in that, they claimed, it lacked notable public support. Following the restoration of M'ba's government in Gabon, the French intervened militarily in Africa roughly every other year. In 1995, the French Minister for Foreign Assistance Jacques Godfrain explained that Paris "will intervene each time an elected democratic power is overthrown by a coup d'état if a military cooperation agreement exists".

Shortly after de Gaulle and Foccart's meeting, French commanders Haulin and Royer were released at the request of the French Embassy. Intervention could not commence without a formal petition to the Head of State of Gabon. Since M'ba was held hostage, the French contacted the Vice President of Gabon, Paul-Marie Yembit, who had not been arrested. At the time, Yembit was in a car with U.S. ambassador Charles Darlington travelling to N'Dende. This was to officially open a school built by the Peace Corps nearby, in Yembit's birthplace of Moussambou, and completing his electoral campaign. Therefore, they decided to compose a predated letter that Yembit would later sign, confirming their intervention. They sent this to him via a small airplane, since there were no road bridges in Gabon at the time and the only way to cross a river was on a ferry. Yembit did not come back to Libreville on the plane as would be expected, but rather at 8:00 WAT on 18 February to read a statement over Radio Libreville that was likely prepared by French officials. Yembit, however, claimed that he called for French intervention while the insurgent troops held M'ba hostage; this version of the story was quickly disputed by several diplomats on the scene, as several French troops had arrived before this alleged incident.

Less than 24 hours after de Gaulle had been notified, French paratroopers stationed in Dakar and Brazzaville under General René Cogny and a General Kergaravat were notified that they were going to end the coup. This had come even before the provisional government was formed. Maurice Robert and Guy Ponsaille, who were among a group Foccart convened to discuss the French intervention, were part of the paratrooper unit. Receiving Foccart's orders to "normalize" the situation by 19 February or the next day at the latest, at 10:50 WAT on 18 February, the first 50 troops landed at the Libreville International Airport. The rebels closed the airport but failed to establish obstacles, allowing the French troops to land unharmed, albeit during a large storm. Throughout that day, more than 600 paratroopers arrived at the airport.

Sweeping through Libreville unopposed, the troops easily captured the provisional council, though they met resistance at the Baraka military base in Lambaréné when they attacked at daylight. Upon learning of the impending attack, Aubame called Cousseran and asked him what had been going on. Cousseran dodged answering the question and requested that Aubame release M'ba uninjured. After receiving the false assurance from the ambassador that the French government had no intention of restoring M'ba to power, Aubame sent out a military officer to the countryside to find the deposed president. M'ba was moved to a small village near the Albert Schweitzer Hospital. At dawn on 19 February, French Air Force Dassault MD 315 Flamant planes strafed the rebels at Baraka, while the French Army attacked the insurgents with machine gun fire and mortars. The rebels at the military base promptly surrendered once their ammunition supply ran out, and their commander, Lieutenant Ndo Edou, was executed. Later, the French army managed to break through the gate to the village where M'ba was held and rescued the deposed president.

Before the end of the day, the French troops surrounded all of Libreville's public buildings. Shortly thereafter, Radio Libreville announced the surrender of the rebel forces. Kergaravat concluded his military operation on 20 February, saluting Cousseran and saying "Mission accomplie". Over its course, one French soldier was killed and 18 died on the Gabonese side. Unofficial sources said two French soldiers and 25 insurgents were killed, with more than 40 Gabonese and four French troops were wounded. The number of civilian casualties was unknown but numerous, as the straw roofs on their homes were not a good protector against aerial bullets.

== Aftermath ==
=== Immediate aftermath and riots ===
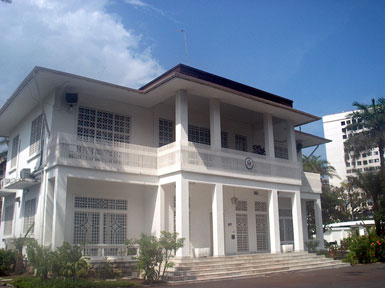
The United States Embassy in Libreville

France's intervention in the coup was openly applauded by the Central African Republic, Chad, Côte d'Ivoire, Madagascar, Niger, and Upper Volta. In fact, France was barely criticised at all in Africa, other than a mild response by Dahomey and one by the Democratic Republic of Congo. The matter was not discussed at the next meeting of the Council of Ministers of the OAU, held on 24 February–29 February in Lagos. The revolutionary movement in French Africa immediately retrogressed following the coup.

M'ba was returned to Libreville on 21 February. Shortly after his arrival, the 10:00 pm curfew that had been imposed by the French was lifted, and some stores were reopened. Squads of officials, known as "les gorilles", travelled through Libreville and arrested any suspected M'ba opposers. After his reinstatement, M'ba refused to believe that the coup was directed against his regime, instead considering it to be a conspiracy against the state. Nonetheless, following the coup M'ba dismissed every soldier in the army and started recruiting new men.

On 1 March, however, anti-government demonstrations began, with protesters shouting "Léon M'ba, président des Français!" ("Léon M'ba, President of the French!") and calling for the end of the "dictatorship". Originating in Libreville, these demonstrations spread to Port-Gentil and Ndendé and lasted into the summer. When 1,000 pro-government demonstrators responded by shouting "Long Live Léon M'ba" outside the presidential palace, they were attacked by dissidents. Among the pro-government demonstrators were an opposition member, Martine Oyane, who had been forcefully undressed following her arrest, beaten by the police, paraded naked throughout Libreville, and forced to shout "Long Live Léon M'ba". At the height of these demonstrations, 3,000 to 4,000 Gabonese protested throughout central Libreville. Protesters also took their anger out against the French in Gabon, stoning more than 30 cars belonging to Frenchmen and chanting "Go home, go home!" This rioting was so intense that M'ba announced that whoever went to work would not be paid. The French reacted to these incidents by swinging rifle butts and throwing grenades. The crowds responded by throwing bottles and stones, though they were put down soon after. There were no reports of injured protesters, despite orders to the Gabonese police that they fire at protesters on sight.

=== Allegations of U.S. involvement ===
Some Gabonese mistakenly identified the United States as a co-conspirator in the coup. Time asserted that French officials helped spread the rumor of American involvement. This reached a point which some automobile stations refused to help Darlington and other Americans. After William F. Courtney, deputy chief of the United States Embassy, received a call from a man identifying himself as DuPont and threatening an imminent attack, a hand grenade exploded outside the embassy. The explosion, which occurred at a time when the building was closed and locked on 3 March, resulted in damage to the embassy sign and the cracking of two windows.

Following the bombing, French Gabonese made more threatening phone calls to the embassy. A second bomb exploded at the embassy two nights later, causing no damage. A drive-by shooting, during which at least five rounds of buckshot were fired from a 12-gauge automatic shotgun, riddled the second-story windows with over 30 holes. It is likely that its perpetrators were French, as Gabonese have no access to grenades. Following the second bombing a car containing white men was noticed, driving through otherwise empty Shore Boulevard. At the time, almost all white men in Gabon were French.

Two Gabonese policemen were assigned to protect the building, and M'ba ordered an investigation into the bombings. He denounced the allegations against Americans, saying:

Nothing permits to determine that the United States played a role in the recent events. However, relations of friendship existing between members of the United States Embassy and some politicians who participated in the rebellion could have given this impression to some, an impression which I do not share.

Many of these attacks against Americans were against Darlington personally. His son Christopher was hit by a grenade in July, though it did not detonate. The ambassador resigned his post on 26 July. It was not until 14 August 1965 that David M. Bane replaced him.

=== 1964 elections ===
Despite these incidents, legislative elections planned before the coup were held in April 1964. They were originally to be held on 23 February, though he dissolved the National Assembly and rescheduled them for 12 April. Upon insistence of the French, M'ba allowed opposition candidates to run, which it claimed was the main reason for starting the coup in the first place. However, their leaders were barred from participating because of their involvement in the coup, and known anti-Mba organizers were deported to remote parts of the country. In addition, M'ba was known to have bribed voters with banknotes.

France closely followed the election, deporting a Peace Corps teacher. The UDSG disappeared from the political scene, and M'ba's opposition was composed of parties that lacked national focus and maintained only regional or pro-democracy platforms. Nevertheless, the opposition garnered 46% of the vote and 16 of 47 seats in the assembly, while the BDG received 54% of the vote and 31 seats. The opposition disputed this, and held strikes across the country, though these did not have a sizable impact on business.

=== Lambaréné trial and rest of M'ba's term ===
Aubame and Gondjout fled Libreville, but were captured sometime before 20 February. Most of the other rebels took refuge at the U.S. Embassy, though they were soon discovered and brought to jail. That August, a trial of the military rebels and provisional government was opened in Lambaréné. A "state of precations" was imposed, which decreed that local government kept surveillance on suspected troublemakers and, if necessary, order curfew, while special permits were required to travel through the town. The trial was held in a school building overlooking the Ogooue River, which was near Albert Schweitzer's hospital. Space at the hearing was limited, so members of the public were disallowed from attending. Permits were required to attend the trial, and family members were restricted to one permit each. Press coverage was limited, and journalists were allowed only if they represented a high-profile news agency. In addition, there were restrictions on the defence of the accused.

The prosecution called 64 separate witnesses. Essone, Mbene, and Aubame claimed that their involvement in the coup was due to a lack of development in the Gabonese army. Judge Leon Auge, the judge in the case, said that if "that is the only reason for your coup d'état, you deserve a severe penalty." Essone said that almost all Gabonese military officers knew of an imminent coup beforehand, while Aubame affirmed his position that he did not participate in its planning. According to him, he formed the provisional government in a constitutional manner, and at the request of some "putschists". He reasoned that the French intervention was effectively an illegal act of interference, an assertion which Gondjout and the former education minister, Jean Marc Ekoh, shared. Ekoh had served as Foreign Minister during the coup. The Gabonese actor said that it should be the French troops being tried, not he and his comrades: "If we'd been able to put up a few more Gabonese soldiers against the French, we'd have won — and we shouldn't be here today."

On 9 September, without consulting M'ba, Leon Auge handed down a verdict which acquitted both Ekoh and Gondjout; although the charges carried the death sentence as a maximum. Aubame was sentenced to 10 years of hard labor and 10 years of exile on a remote island off Setté Cama, 160 kilometres (100 mi) down the coast of Gabon, as were most criminals of the case. He was not particularly popular during his political career, though according to Time, his arrest "ballooned him to heroic proportions in the eyes of the aroused public". While serving his 10 years of labor, he was beaten regularly by prison guards. Besides Aubame, M'ba imprisoned more than 150 of his opponents, most of whom were sentenced to 20 years of hard labor. These included the two officers and Aubame's nephew, Pierre Eyeguet, a former ambassador to the United Kingdom. The actor and the doctor were given 10 years of imprisonment each. While appealing for peace on 18 February, he pledged "no pardon or pity" to his enemies, but rather "total punishment".

Two years after the coup there was still open repression of dissent in Gabon. Following these events M'ba became increasingly reclusive, staying in his presidential palace protected by French troops known as the "Clan des Gabonais". Not even Yembit was close to him, but Foccart's friends Ponsaille and Robert "were never far" from M'ba, according to Pean, and provided the aging president with counseling and advice. M'ba was, however, still convinced of his popularity. Three years later, M'ba was diagnosed with cancer, and he died on 28 November 1967. After M'ba's death, French-supported Bongo succeeded him as president, and released Aubame in 1972.

== Footnotes ==
=== Notes ===
- [a] "Tout Gabonais a deux patries : la France et le Gabon."
- [b] "Se voulant et se croyant sincèrement démocrate, au point qu'aucune accusation ne l'irrite davantage que celle d'être un dictateur, il n'en a pas moins eu de cesse qu'il n'ait fait voter une constitution lui accordant pratiquement tous les pouvoirs et réduisant le parlement au rôle d'un décor coûteux que l'on escamote même en cas de besoin."
- [c] "Le jour J est arrivé, les injustices ont dépassé la mesure, ce peuple est patient, mais sa patience a des limites... il est arrivé à bout."

=== Bibliography ===
- Bernault, Florence (1996), Démocraties ambiguës en Afrique centrale: Congo-Brazzaville, Gabon, 1940–1965 (in French), Paris: Karthala, ISBN 2-86537-636-2, OCLC 36142247.
- Biteghe, Moïse N'Solé (1990), Echec aux militaires au Gabon en 1964 (in French), Paris: Chaka, ISBN 2-907768-06-9, OCLC 29518659.
- Darlington, Charles Francis; Darlington, Alice B. (1968), African Betrayal, New York, New York: D. McKay Co., OCLC 172139.
- Gardinier, David E. (1994), Historical Dictionary of Gabon (2nd ed.), Metuchen, New Jersey: Scarecrow Press, ISBN 0-8108-1435-8, OCLC 7462387.
- International Institute for Strategic Studies (1964), Adelphi Papers: NATO and the Cyprus Crisis, Adelphi Papers (9,14,17,21–23 ed.), Oxford: Oxford University Press, OCLC 173447370.
- Keese, Alexander (2004), "L'évolution du leader indigène aux yeux des administrateurs français: Léon M'Ba et le changement des modalités de participation au pouvoir local au Gabon, 1922–1967", Afrique & Histoire (in French), 2 (1): 141–170, doi:10.3917/afhi.002.0141, ISSN 1764-1977.
- Matthews, Ronald (1966), African Powder Keg: Revolt and Dissent in Six Emergent Nations, London: The Bodley Head, OCLC 246401461.
- Murison, Katharine, ed. (2003), Africa South of the Sahara 2004 (33rd ed.), London: Europa Publications, ISBN 1-85743-183-9, OCLC 52621809.
- Péan, Pierre (1983), Affaires africaines (in French), Paris: Fayard, ISBN 2-213-01324-1, OCLC 10363948.
- Reed, Michael C. (June 1987), "Gabon: A Neo-Colonial Enclave of Enduring French Interest", The Journal of Modern African Studies, 25 (2), Cambridge University Press: 283–320, doi:10.1017/S0022278X00000392, JSTOR 161015, OCLC 77874468, S2CID 153880808.
- Wallerstein, Immanuel Maurice (2005), Africa: The Politics of Independence and Unity, Lincoln, Nebraska: University of Nebraska Press, ISBN 0-8032-9856-0, OCLC 60590049.
- Yates, Douglas A. (1996), The rentier state in Africa: oil rent dependency and neocolonialism in the Republic of Gabon, Trenton, New Jersey: Africa World Press, ISBN 0-86543-521-9, OCLC 34543635.
