= General debate of the eighty-first session of the United Nations General Assembly =

September 2026 session

- 22 – 28 September 2026 81st session 81st general debate

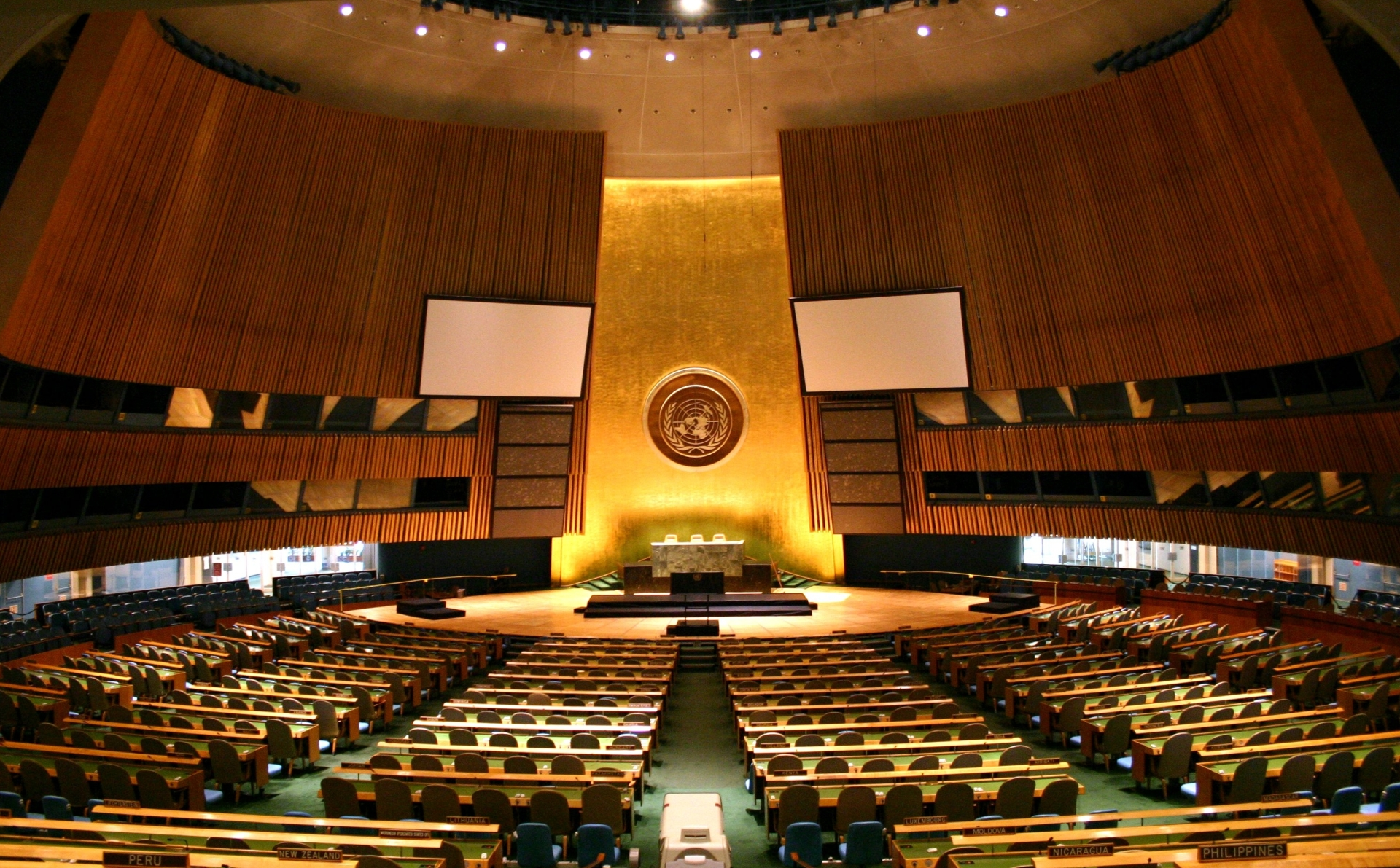
- General Assembly Hall at United Nations Headquarters, New York City
- Host country: United Nations
- Cities: New York City, United States
- Venues: General Assembly Hall at the United Nations Headquarters
- Participants: United Nations Member States
- President: Khalilur Rahman

The general debate of the eighty-first session of the United Nations General Assembly (UNGA) opened on 22 September and ran to 28 September 2026. Leaders from a number of member states addressed the UNGA.

== Organization and subjects ==
The order of speakers is given first to member states, then observer states and supranational bodies. Any other observer entities have a chance to speak at the end of the debate, if they so choose. Speakers are put on the list in the order of their request, with special consideration for ministers and other government officials of similar or higher rank. According to the rules in place for the general debate, the statements should be in one of the United Nations official languages (Arabic, Chinese, English, French, Russian or Spanish) and will be interpreted by interpreters. Each speaker is requested to provide advance copies of their statements to the conference officers to facilitate interpretation. The theme for the 2026 general debate was chosen by the President of the General Assembly, Khalilur Rahman, as: "Restoring trust, managing transformation: A United Nations that delivers for all."

== Notable speeches ==
=== Argentina ===
President Javier Milei reiterated Argentina's sovereignty over the Falkland Islands.

=== Brazil ===
President Lula da Silva emphasized Brazilian sovereignty, reaffirming that Brazil does not accept external interference in its political and institutional decisions. Lula advocated for the strengthening of multilateralism and the reform of the Security Council, criticizing the paralysis of the United Nations in the face of international conflicts. He also condemned the wars in Gaza and Ukraine, while highlighting the importance of combating inequality, protecting the environment, and regulating large technology companies and artificial intelligence.

=== Cuba ===
Foreign Minister Bruno Rodríguez Parrilla addressed the Assembly on 26 September, condemning the Trump administration's "maximum pressure" policy against Cuba as collective punishment. He cited Trump's remark in his own speech four days earlier that the US was applying the greatest pressure ever on the Cuban government. The Cuban delegation had earlier walked out during Trump's speech, in which he called Cuba a "completely failed state" and predicted the downfall of its government.

=== Israel ===
Pro-Palestine protesters in Times Square in front of a state sponsored pro-Israel ad on the day of Netanyahu's speech, September 24

A Times Square ad displays a photo of Netanyahu waving, with the text "Welcome Prime Minister Netanyahu", September 24

Protesters march through Manhattan on the day of Netanyahu's speech, September 24

In a speech delivered on September 24, Prime Minister Benjamin Netanyahu defended Israel's actions in the Gaza war and denied that Israel was committing genocide in Gaza Strip. 77 countries' delegations, mostly African and Muslim-majority, walked out during his speech, while protestors gathered outside the General Assembly Building.

=== Iran ===
President Masoud Pezeshkian used his 23 September speech to rebut Trump's remarks of the previous day, accusing the United States and Israel of aggression and terrorism and insisting that Iran had "only defended" itself. Addressing Trump by name, he said Iran would "never bow our head or bend the knee" but was ready for negotiations without accepting "the language of force". He held up photographs of the late Supreme Leader Ali Khamenei and of schoolgirls killed in an alleged US air strike. A US delegate walked out as he began speaking, and the Israeli delegation boycotted the address, a day after most of Iran's delegation had left the hall during Trump's speech.

At a press briefing at a New York hotel on 24 September, Pezeshkian denied that Iran sought to kill Trump, saying it had never been the Iranian government's position, "overtly or covertly", to seek the assassination of Trump or his family. The US had accused Iran of plotting his death, including in a case in which the Justice Department announced charges in 2024, and hardline Iranian media and rallies had featured calls to kill Trump.

=== United States ===
U.S. president Donald Trump addresses the assembly at the Headquarters of the United Nations

President Donald Trump spoke on 22 September, the first day of the debate. Much of his address concerned the war with Iran; he asked whether he should "annihilate the Islamic Republic" or offer it a chance to rebuild through a deal. He also promoted the strength of the US and a security agreement with Denmark and Greenland, signed on the sidelines of the Assembly, that would allow two American military bases in the territory. Delegations from Iran and Cuba walked out during the speech.

=== Venezuela ===
Acting President Delcy Rodríguez gave her first address to the Assembly since taking office after the capture of Nicolás Maduro, the first by a Venezuelan head of state since Maduro's in 2018. She promised that elections would be held, saying the government had begun a political dialogue with opposition sectors, but gave no date. She thanked Trump for resuming diplomatic relations and cooperation between the two countries, and restated Venezuela's claim to the Guayana Esequiba. She had met Trump on the sidelines of the Assembly the day before.

== Speaking schedule ==
Since 1955, Brazil and the United States have been the first and second countries to speak. Other countries follow according to a speaking schedule issued by the Secretariat.

The list of speakers was published and updated daily in the Journal of the United Nations and on the general debate website.

=== 22 September ===
==== Morning session ====
- United Nations – António Guterres, Secretary-General (Report of the Secretary-General)
- United Nations – Khalilur Rahman, President of the General Assembly (Opening statement)
- Brazil – President Luiz Inácio Lula da Silva
- United States – President Donald Trump
- Jordan – King Abdullah II
- Turkey – President Recep Tayyip Erdoğan
- Kyrgyzstan – President Sadyr Japarov
- Qatar – Emir Tamim bin Hamad Al Thani
- Lithuania – President Gitanas Nausėda
- Peru – President Keiko Fujimori
- Chile – President José Antonio Kast
- Finland – President Alexander Stubb
- Luxembourg – Grand Duke Guillaume V
- France – President Emmanuel Macron
- Angola – President João Lourenço

==== Afternoon session ====
- Mongolia – President Ukhnaagiin Khürelsükh
- South Korea – President Lee Jae Myung
- Suriname – President Jennifer Geerlings-Simons
- Sierra Leone – President Julius Maada Bio
- Bosnia and Herzegovina – Chairman of the Presidency Denis Bećirović
- Dominica – President Sylvanie Burton
- Switzerland – President Guy Parmelin
- Seychelles – President Patrick Herminie
- Nauru – President David Adeang
- Vietnam – General Secretary and President Tô Lâm
- Tanzania – Vice-President Deogratius Ndejembi
- Bhutan – Prime Minister Tshering Tobgay
- Trinidad and Tobago – Prime Minister Kamla Persad-Bissessar
- Japan – Prime Minister Sanae Takaichi
- United Kingdom – Prime Minister Andy Burnham
- Croatia – Prime Minister Andrej Plenković
- Belgium – Deputy Prime Minister Maxime Prévot
- Morocco – Minister of Foreign Affairs Nasser Bourita

=== 23 September ===
==== Morning session ====
- Syria – President Ahmed al-Sharaa
- Latvia – President Edgars Rinkēvičs
- Romania – President Nicușor Dan
- Burundi – President Évariste Ndayishimiye
- Iran – President Masoud Pezeshkian
- Paraguay – President Santiago Peña
- Czech Republic – President Petr Pavel
- Argentina – President Javier Milei
- Estonia – President Alar Karis
- Timor-Leste – President José Ramos-Horta
- Libya – Chairman of the Presidential Council Mohamed al-Menfi
- Palau – President Surangel Whipps Jr.
- Cyprus – President Nikos Christodoulides
- Dominican Republic – President Luis Abinader
- Botswana – President Duma Boko
- Ecuador – President Daniel Noboa
- Ukraine – President Volodymyr Zelenskyy
- Bulgaria – President Iliana Iotova
- Central African Republic – President Faustin-Archange Touadéra
- Panama – President José Raúl Mulino
- Ethiopia – President Taye Atske Selassie

==== Afternoon session ====
- Poland – President Karol Nawrocki
- Namibia – President Netumbo Nandi-Ndaitwah
- Slovakia – President Peter Pellegrini
- Kenya – President William Ruto
- Serbia – President Aleksandar Vučić
- Mozambique – President Daniel Chapo
- Guinea – President Mamady Doumbouya
- Eswatini – King Mswati III
- Honduras – President Nasry Asfura
- Montenegro – President Jakov Milatović
- Venezuela – Acting President Delcy Rodríguez
- Uganda – Vice-President Jessica Alupo
- Rwanda – Prime Minister Justin Nsengiyumva
- Spain – Prime Minister Pedro Sánchez
- Andorra – Head of Government Xavier Espot Zamora
- Democratic Republic of the Congo – Prime Minister Judith Suminwa
- Italy – Deputy Prime Minister Antonio Tajani
- Uzbekistan – Head of Presidential Administration Saida Mirziyoyeva

=== 24 September ===
==== Morning session ====
- Zimbabwe – President Emmerson Mnangagwa
- Madagascar – President Michael Randrianirina
- Ghana – President John Mahama
- Palestine – President Mahmoud Abbas (via pre-recorded video)
- Guyana – President Irfaan Ali
- Somalia – President Hassan Sheikh Mohamud
- Comoros – President Azali Assoumani
- Liberia – President Joseph Boakai
- Bolivia – President Rodrigo Paz
- Hungary – President András Baka
- Uruguay – President Yamandú Orsi
- European Union – President of the European Council António Costa
- Equatorial Guinea – Vice President Teodoro Nguema Obiang Mangue
- Gambia – Vice-President Muhammad B. S. Jallow
- Colombia – Vice President José Manuel Restrepo
- Israel – Prime Minister Benjamin Netanyahu
- Portugal – Prime Minister Luís Montenegro

==== Afternoon session ====
- Senegal – President Bassirou Diomaye Faye
- Fiji – President Naiqama Lalabalavu
- Ivory Coast – Vice-President Tiémoko Meyliet Koné
- Nigeria – Vice-President Kashim Shettima
- Yemen – Vice President of the Presidential Leadership Council Abdullah al-Alimi Bawazir
- Kuwait – Crown Prince Sabah Al-Khalid Al-Sabah
- Barbados – Prime Minister Mia Mottley
- Armenia – Prime Minister Nikol Pashinyan
- Thailand – Prime Minister Anutin Charnvirakul
- Georgia – Prime Minister Irakli Kobakhidze
- Bangladesh – Prime Minister Tarique Rahman
- Netherlands – Prime Minister Rob Jetten
- Slovenia – Prime Minister Janez Janša
- Greece – Prime Minister Kyriakos Mitsotakis
- Australia – Prime Minister Anthony Albanese
- Ireland – Taoiseach Micheál Martin
- Nepal – Prime Minister Balen Shah
- Austria – Minister for European and International Affairs Beate Meinl-Reisinger
- South Africa – Minister of International Relations and Cooperation Ronald Lamola

=== 25 September ===
==== Morning session ====
- Kiribati – President Taneti Maamau
- Maldives – Vice President Hussain Mohamed Latheef
- Iraq – Prime Minister Ali al-Zaidi
- Lebanon – Prime Minister Nawaf Salam
- Monaco – Minister of State Christophe Mirmand
- Marshall Islands – President Hilda Heine
- Malta – Prime Minister Robert Abela
- Lesotho – Prime Minister Sam Matekane
- Tuvalu – Prime Minister Feleti Teo
- North Macedonia – Prime Minister Hristijan Mickoski
- Solomon Islands – Prime Minister Matthew Wale
- Saint Lucia – Prime Minister Philip J. Pierre
- Albania – Prime Minister Edi Rama
- Pakistan – Prime Minister Shehbaz Sharif
- Papua New Guinea – Prime Minister James Marape
- Niger – Prime Minister Ali Lamine Zeine
- Bahamas – Prime Minister Philip Davis
- Haiti – Acting Prime Minister Alix Didier Fils-Aimé
- Liechtenstein – Deputy Prime Minister Sabine Monauni

==== Afternoon session ====
- Guinea-Bissau – Prime Minister Ilídio Vieira Té
- Egypt – Prime Minister Mostafa Madbouly
- Saint Vincent and the Grenadines – Prime Minister Godwin Friday
- Tonga – Prime Minister Fatafehi Fakafānua
- Samoa – Deputy Prime Minister Mulipola Anarosa Ale Molioʻo
- Saint Kitts and Nevis – Deputy Prime Minister Geoffrey Hanley
- Bahrain – Minister for Foreign Affairs Abdullatif bin Rashid Al Zayani
- Azerbaijan – Minister for Foreign Affairs Jeyhun Bayramov
- Kazakhstan – Minister for Foreign Affairs Mukhtar Tleuberdi
- Mauritania – Minister for Foreign Affairs Mohamed Salem Ould Merzoug
- Mexico – Minister for Foreign Affairs Roberto Velasco Álvarez
- Mauritius – Minister of Foreign Affairs, Regional Integration and International Trade Ritish Ramful
- Chad – Minister of Public Health Abdel-Madjid Abderahim Mahamat
- Norway – Minister for Foreign Affairs Espen Barth Eide
- Guatemala – Foreign Minister Carlos Ramiro Martínez
- Sweden – Minister for Foreign Affairs Maria Malmer Stenergard
- Togo – Minister of Foreign Affairs Robert Dussey

=== 26 September ===
==== Morning session ====
- China – Vice President Han Zheng
- Federated States of Micronesia – Vice President Aren Palik
- Belize – Prime Minister Johnny Briceño
- Cape Verde – Prime Minister Francisco Carvalho
- Moldova – Prime Minister Vasile Tofan
- Holy See – Secretary of State Pietro Parolin
- Laos – Deputy Prime Minister Thongsavanh Phomvihane
- Cambodia – Deputy Prime Minister Prak Sokhonn
- Philippines – Secretary for Foreign Affairs Tess Lazaro
- Cuba – Minister for Foreign Affairs Bruno Rodríguez Parrilla
- Russia – Minister for Foreign Affairs Sergey Lavrov
- Brunei – Minister for Foreign Affairs Abdul Mateen
- Saudi Arabia – Minister for Foreign Affairs Faisal bin Farhan Al Saud
- Iceland – Minister for Foreign Affairs Þorgerður Katrín Gunnarsdóttir
- Singapore – Minister for Foreign Affairs Vivian Balakrishnan
- Nicaragua – Minister for Foreign Affairs Valdrack Jaentschke
- India – Minister for External Affairs S. Jaishankar
- Germany – Minister for Foreign Affairs Johann Wadephul
- Belarus – Minister for Foreign Affairs Maxim Ryzhenkov
- Tajikistan – Minister for Foreign Affairs Sirojiddin Muhriddin
- Tunisia – Minister for Foreign Affairs Mohamed Ali Nafti

==== Afternoon session ====
- San Marino – Secretary for Foreign and Political Affairs Luca Beccari
- Djibouti – Minister for Foreign Affairs Abdoulkader Houssein Omar
- Malaysia – Minister for Foreign Affairs Mohamad Hasan
- Oman – Minister for Foreign Affairs Badr bin Hamad Al Busaidi
- Gabon – Minister for Foreign Affairs Marie-Édith Tassyla-Ye-Doumbeneny
- Canada – Minister of Foreign Affairs Anita Anand
- Jamaica – Minister for Foreign Affairs and Foreign Trade Kamina Johnson Smith
- São Tomé and Príncipe – Minister for Foreign Affairs Ilza Amado Vaz
- Zambia – Minister of Foreign Affairs and International Cooperation Mulambo Haimbe
- Indonesia – Minister for Foreign Affairs Sugiono
- Cameroon – Minister for Foreign Affairs Lejeune Mbella Mbella

=== 28 September ===
==== Morning session ====
- Mali – Minister for Foreign Affairs Abdoulaye Diop
- Eritrea – Minister for Foreign Affairs Osman Saleh
- Burkina Faso – Minister for Foreign Affairs Karamoko Jean-Marie Traoré
- Algeria – Minister for Foreign Affairs Ahmed Attaf
- El Salvador – Minister for Foreign Affairs Alexandra Hill Tinoco
- Malawi – Minister for Foreign Affairs George Chaponda
- Sri Lanka – Minister for Foreign Affairs Vijitha Herath
- Republic of the Congo – Minister for Foreign Affairs Constant-Serge Bounda
- Sudan – Minister for Foreign Affairs Mohi El-Din Salem
- United Arab Emirates – Minister of State at the Ministry of Foreign Affairs Khalifa Shaheen Al Marar
- North Korea – Vice Minister for Foreign Affairs Kim Son Gyong
- New Zealand – Permanent Representative Victoria Hallum
- Turkmenistan – Permanent Representative Wepa Hajyýew
- Antigua and Barbuda – Permanent Representative Walton Alfonso Webson
- Grenada – Permanent Representative Ingrid Jackson
- South Sudan – Permanent Representative Cecilia Adout Majok Adeng
- Denmark – Permanent Representative Christina Markus Lassen
- Costa Rica – Permanent Representative Boris Vasir Marchegiani Carrero
- Vanuatu – Permanent Representative Odo Tevi
- Benin – Permanent Representative Marc Hermanne Gninadoou Araba
- United Nations – Khalilur Rahman, President of the General Assembly (Closing statement)
