= Liliane Massala =

Gabonese diplomat (born 1964)

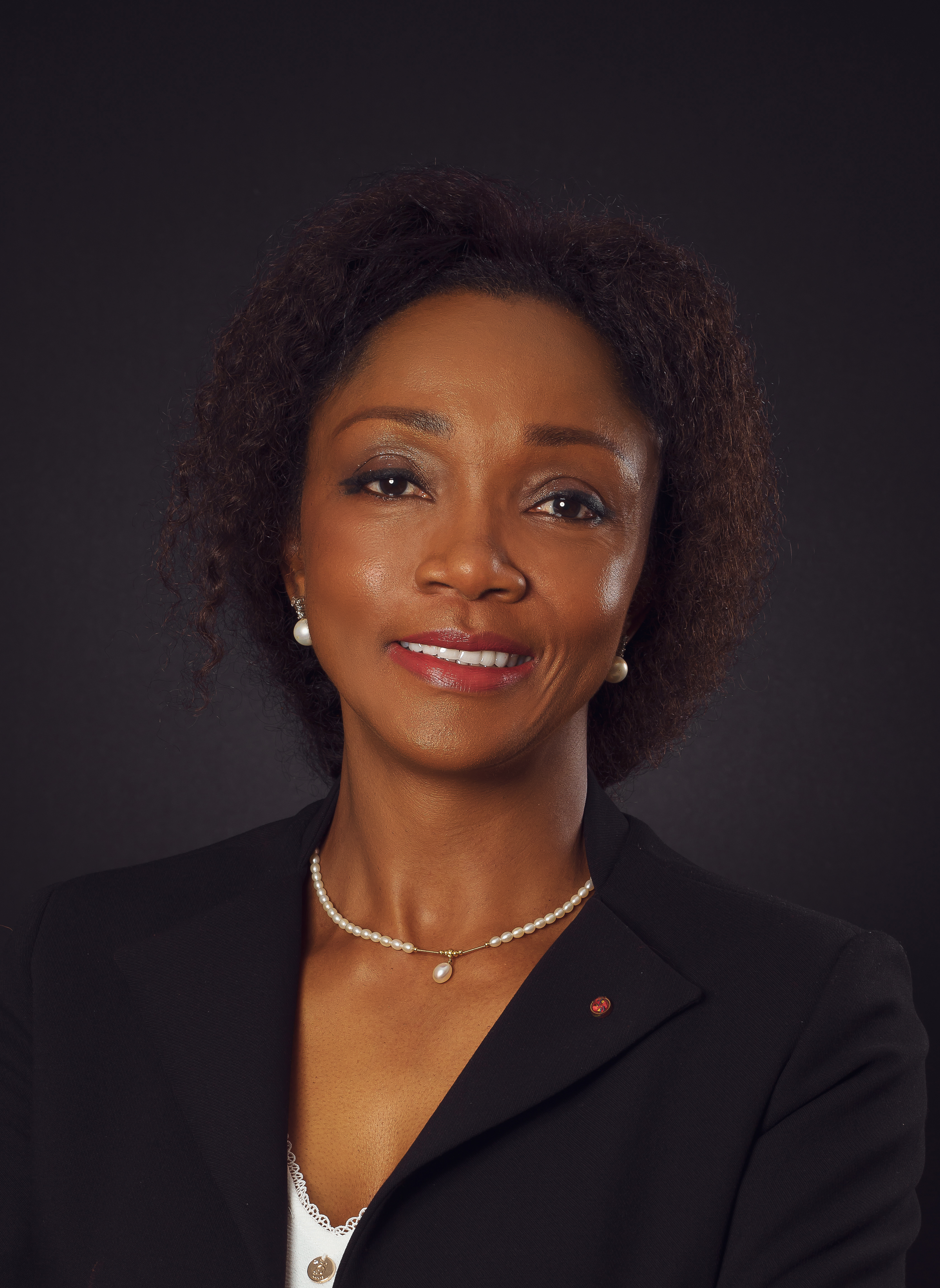
- Massala in 2020

High Representative of Gabon to France and Andorra and delegate to the Organisation internationale de la Francophonie (OIF)
- In office 20 October 2020 – 16 April 2024
- Prime Minister: Rose Christiane Ossouka Raponda; Alain Claude Bilie By Nze; Raymond Ndong Sima
- Preceded by: Flavien Enongoue
- Succeeded by: Marie-Édith Tassyla-Ye-Doumbeneny

Personal details
- Born: 12 December 1964 (age 61)
- Education: Université du Québec à Montréal (MBA)

Liliane Massala (born 12 December 1964) is a Gabonese civil servant and diplomat. She was the High Representative of Gabon to France and Andorra and delegate the Organisation internationale de la Francophonie (OIF) from October 2020 to April 2024. Massala has also previously served as Deputy Chief of Staff to the President of the Republic, Secretary General at the Ministry of Family and Social Affairs and Secretary General at the Ministry of Communication and the Digital Economy. She is the founder of Gabon's Digital and Gender Forum (FNG) and International Institute for Advanced Education and Training (IIEFA), which specialises in digital professions.

== Biography ==
Massala is the daughter of politician and diplomat Édouard Bulabul and his wife Christine Bahati. She studied a Master's in Business Administration (MBA) at the Université du Québec à Montréal in Canada.

From 2007 to 2009, Massala was Deputy Chief of Staff to the President of the Republic. In 2010, she led an economic mission from Gabon to Serbia and the Republic of San Marino.

From 2012 to 2014, Massala was Secretary General at the Ministry of Family and Social Affairs.

From 2014 until 2020, Massala was Secretary General at the Ministry of Communication and the Digital Economy. In the role, she founded the Digital and Gender Forum (FNG) in Libreville as well as the International Institute for Advanced Education and Training (IIEFA) in Gabon, which specialises in digital professions. She also sponsored the Digie Women School's virtual open days in August 2020.

Massala was appointed as Gabon's High Representative to France and Andorra and as delegate to the Organisation internationale de la Francophonie (OIF) from 20 October 2020. She was the third woman appointed to this post, following Honorine Dossou Naki and Félicité Ongouori Ngoubili. Massala presented her credentials to Pierre-Christian Soccoja, the Deputy Director of State Protocol and Diplomatic Events at the French Ministry for Europe and Foreign Affairs. She served as High Representative until 16 April 2024 and was succeeded by Marie-Édith Tassyla-Ye-Doumbeneny in June 2024.

As Ambassador, Massala requested that the French Minister of Ecology and President of COP21, Ségolène Royal, host a series of virtual conferences on environmental issues for Gabonese students in France. On International Women's Day in 2021 she initiated the creation of a "Women's Diplomacy" unit in the Gabonese embassy, to conduct discussions focused on the role of women in Gabonese diplomacy. She also attended the opening of Gabon's new consulate in Marseille in 2022.

Alongside her civil service and diplomacy career, Massala has founded Moza Consulting. In February 2025, with Michel Fossaert she co-organised a conference held at the InterContinental Paris le Grand Hotel titled "Agriculture and Food Security in Africa." From 2014 to 2022, she also served as Member of the Board of Directors and Vice President of the World Union of Small and Medium Enterprises (WUSME).
