= Jean-Hilaire Aubame =

Gabonese politician (1912–1989)

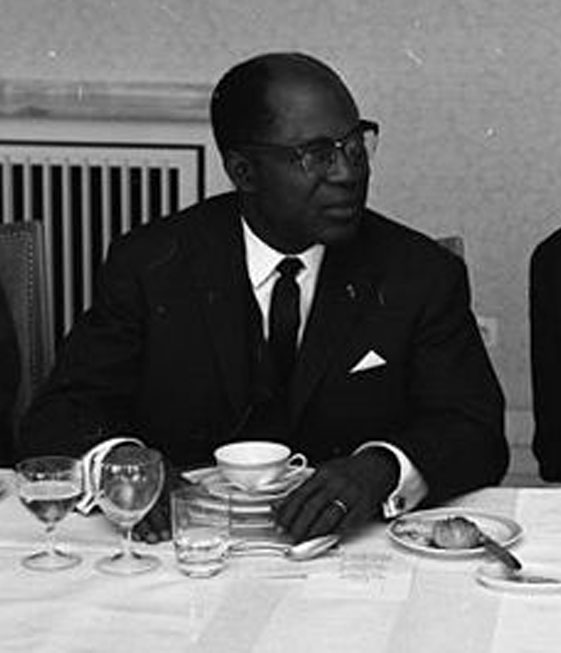
- Aubame in 1962

President of Gabon (disputed)
- In office 18 February 1964 – 19 February 1964
- Preceded by: Revolutionary Committee
- Succeeded by: Léon M'ba

Foreign Minister of Gabon
- In office 1961–1963
- Preceded by: André Gustave Anguilé
- Succeeded by: Jean François Ondo

Personal details
- Born: 10 November 1912 Libreville, Gabon
- Died: 18 August 1989 (aged 76) Libreville, Gabon
- Party: Gabonese Democratic and Social Union
- Spouse

Jean-Hilaire Aubame (10 November 1912 – 18 August 1989) was a Gabonese politician active during both the colonial and independence periods. The French journalist Pierre Péan said that Aubame's training "as a practicing Catholic and a customs official helped to make him an integrated man, one of whom political power was not an end in itself."

Born into a Fang family, Aubame was orphaned at a young age. He was raised by the stepbrother of Léon M'ba, who became Aubame's chief political rival. Encouraged by his colleagues, Aubame entered politics, serving as Gabon's first representative in the National Assembly of France from 1946 to 1958. Aubame was also a leader in solving African problems, particularly developing the Gabonese standard of living and planning urban sites. Aubame's quick rise in Gabonese politics was spurred by the support of the missions and administration, whereas much of M'ba's strength came from the colonists.

Despite a rivalry, Aubame and M'ba, now the President of Gabon, formed several political unions which were sufficiently politically balanced to appeal to the electorate. In appreciation for his help, M'ba appointed Aubame as foreign minister and later President of the Supreme Court. Tensions soon rose between the two due to Aubame's refusal to merge his party with M'ba's and create a one-party state. Aubame was installed as President of Gabon during a 1964 coup d'état against M'ba. However, the coup was toppled three days later, and although he did not participate in the coup's planning, Aubame was sentenced to 10 years of hard labor and 10 years of exile. He was beaten almost daily by his prison guards while serving out his sentence. M'ba's successor as President, Omar Bongo, allowed the return of Aubame to Gabon in 1972. The elder politician died in 1989 in Gabon's capital of Libreville.

== Youth and early political career ==
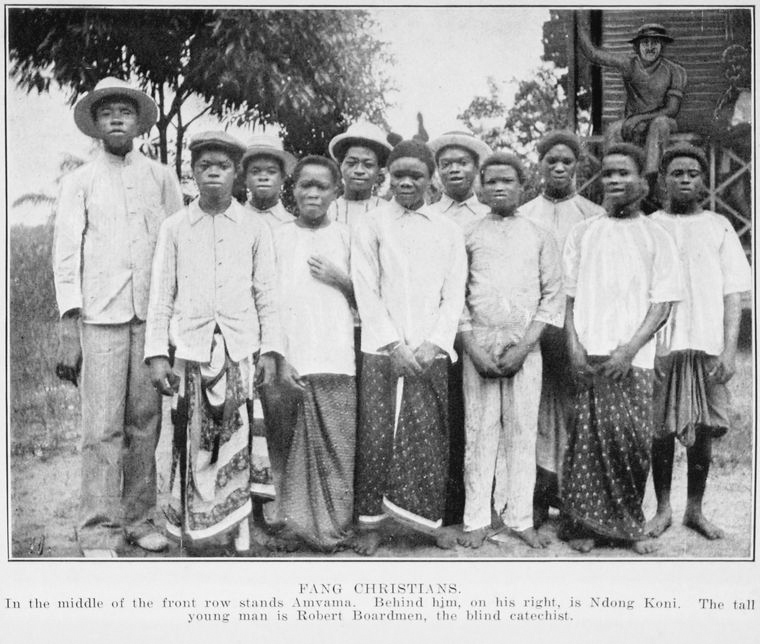
Fangs in a Christian mission, c. 1912

Born into a Fang family near Libreville, Aubame lost his father at eight years of age and his mother at eleven. Abbé Jean Obame, stepbrother of Léon M'ba, looked after the orphaned Aubame and arranged for schooling at several Roman Catholic missions. After he graduated, Aubame became a schoolteacher.

M'ba helped get him a job in customs on 24 March 1931. First appointed to Libreville from 1931 to 1935, he was transferred to Bangui in 1935 and then to Brazzaville in 1936, where he co-founded a branch of the Mutuelle Gabonaise with a brother of politician Louis Bigmann. He was also a member of the Association des fonctionnaires, an organization which was dominated by two other soon-to-be politicians: René-Paul Sousatte and Jean Rémy Ayouné.

Following the speech given by Charles de Gaulle on the Appeal of 18 June 1940, Aubame sided with the Free French, and in November was sent by Libreville authorities to rally Fangs for the cause. In February 1942, Aubame met colonial administrator Félix Éboué and quickly became his protégé. He served as an informant for Éboué on African affairs. Aubame's reward was to be one of several Africans promoted on 23 February 1943 into the European section of the civil service, and on 1 January 1944 Éboué appointed him president of the municipal commission for the Poto-Poto section of Brazzaville.

Aubame participated in the 1944 Brazzaville Conference and served in this post until 10 November 1946. After Éboué's sudden death in March 1944, Aubame worked as an adviser to Governor-General André Bayardelle and his secretary André Soucadoux. They encouraged Aubame to run for office, and he returned to Gabon to campaign with the support of both the administration and the missionaries.

== Deputy ==
=== Deputy to the French National Assembly ===
Aubame lost in the 1945 elections, though on 10 November 1946 became Gabon's first representative to the French National Assembly by winning 7,069 votes out of 12,528 possible. From 1946 to 1951 he was Commissioner of shipping, the press, communication, labor and social security. He voted for Algerian independence on 27 August 1947 and for the establishment of a Council of Europe on 9 July 1949.

On 17 June 1951, Aubame was reelected a deputy with 17,329 votes out of a total of 29,203 and on 2 January 1956 with 26,712 votes out of a total of 57,031, with this term lasting until the end of the Fourth French Republic. Around this time, M'ba was establishing his political career after being exiled to Oubangui-Chari. Affiliating with the French Section of the Workers' International (SFIO), Aubame later worked most closely with the Indépendants d'Outre-Mer, an African parliamentary group whose leaders were Senegalese Léopold Sédar Senghor and Cameroonian Louis-Paul Aujoulat. While a deputy he lived in Paris and toured Gabon regularly.

He continued to develop local Gabonese politics, in particular revitalizing the Fang clans. In fact, M'ba asserted that Aubame was too involved with the Fang to pay attention to the interests of the southern tribes, a charge Aubame ridiculed. Aubame was also a leader in solving African problems, particularly developing the Gabonese standard of living and planning urban sites. On 29 September 1951, he voted to increase the minimum wage in the overseas territories of France, and served as vice president of its Commission from 1953 to 1955. He organized the Gabonese Democratic and Social Union (UDSG) in 1947, whose leadership came mostly from the interior, particularly Woleu-Ntem Province. The party in turn backed Aubame's reelection in 1951 and 1956. It had few philosophical differences with the M'ba-led Bloc Démocratique Gabonais (BDG), including advocating less economic dependence on France and faster "Africanization" of French political jobs. Fairly quickly, Gabonese politics became dominated by Aubame, supported by the missions and the administration, and M'ba, supported by the settlers.

=== Deputy to the Gabonese Territorial Assembly ===
In 1952 he was elected as Woleu-N'Tem's representative for Gabon's Territorial Assembly. He was re-elected in the March 1957 elections, in which the UDSG also placed first, winning 18 of the 40 contested seats, against 16 for BDG. M'ba's party won 21 seats against 19 for Aubame's party after a recount. However, in the absence of an absolute majority, on 21 May 1957, both parties were obligated to submit a list of individuals that both agreed were suitable for inclusion in the government. That same day, M'ba was appointed vice president of the government. Soon, divisions within the government grew, and Aubame resigned from his position and filed a motion of censure against the government. The motion was rejected by a 21–19 vote. With M'ba's victory, many elected UDSG members joined the parliamentary majority, giving the ruling government 29 of the 40 legislative seats. Well installed in the government, he slowly began to reinforce his power.

== Independence and opposition ==
=== Opposition leader ===
Flag of Gabon

After voting in favor of the 1958 French constitutional referendum, Gabon became pseudo-politically independent. Legislative elections were scheduled for 19 June 1960 through the Scrutin de Liste voting system, a form of bloc voting in which each party offers a list of candidates who the population vote for; the list that obtains a majority of votes is declared the winner and wins all the contested seats. Through the redistricting of district and constituency boundaries, the BDG arbitrarily received 244 seats, while the UDSG received 77. In the months that followed, the legislative majority was plagued by internal strife. M'ba, now President of Gabon, decided to dissolve the Assembly and looked to the opposition to strengthen his position.

With Aubame, he formed a number of sufficiently balanced political unions to appeal to the electorate. On 12 February, they won 99.75% of the vote, and later that day, M'ba, running unopposed, was elected president of Gabon. For his cooperation, M'ba appointed Aubame foreign minister, replacing André Gustave Anguilé. In contrast to M'ba who wanted a strong executive regime, Aubame preferred a parliamentary republic. Tensions rose when a new constitution was unanimously adopted, on 21 February 1961, providing for a "hyperprésidentiel" regime. Under this system, M'ba was able to appoint ministers whose functions and limitations were decided by him.

On 19 February, he broke his ties with Aubame; all UDSG representatives were dismissed, with the exception of M'ba supporter Francis Meye. This was due to Aubame's refusal to merge the UDSG with M'ba's and create a one-party state. In an attempt to oust Aubame from his legislative seat, M'ba appointed him President of the Supreme Court on 25 February. Thereafter, M'ba claimed that Aubame had resigned from the National Assembly, citing incompatibility with parliamentary functions. Aubame resolved the accusation by resigning from his post as President of the Supreme Court, complicating matters for M'ba. Faced with reports of tension between the government and the National Assembly, even though 70% of its composition were BDG members, the Gabonese president dissolved the legislature on 21 January 1964 as an "economy measure".

The electoral conditions were announced as such: The election 67 districts were reduced to 47. M'ba disqualified Aubame by announcing no one who held a post recently was banned. Any party would have to submit 47 candidates who had to pay US$160 or none at all. Thus, over US$7,500 would be deposited without considering campaign expenses. M'ba's idea was that no party other than his would have the money to enter candidates. In response to this, the opposition announced its refusal to participate in elections that they did not consider fair.

It is unlikely that Aubame participated in the planning of the 1964 Gabon coup d'état. It appears that he joined the effort after being recruited by the new government. His nephew, Pierre Eyeguet, a former ambassador to the United Kingdom, may have known of the plot beforehand and notified his uncle, although it is unknown whether or not Aubame established contact with the plotters.

=== 1964 Gabon coup d'état ===
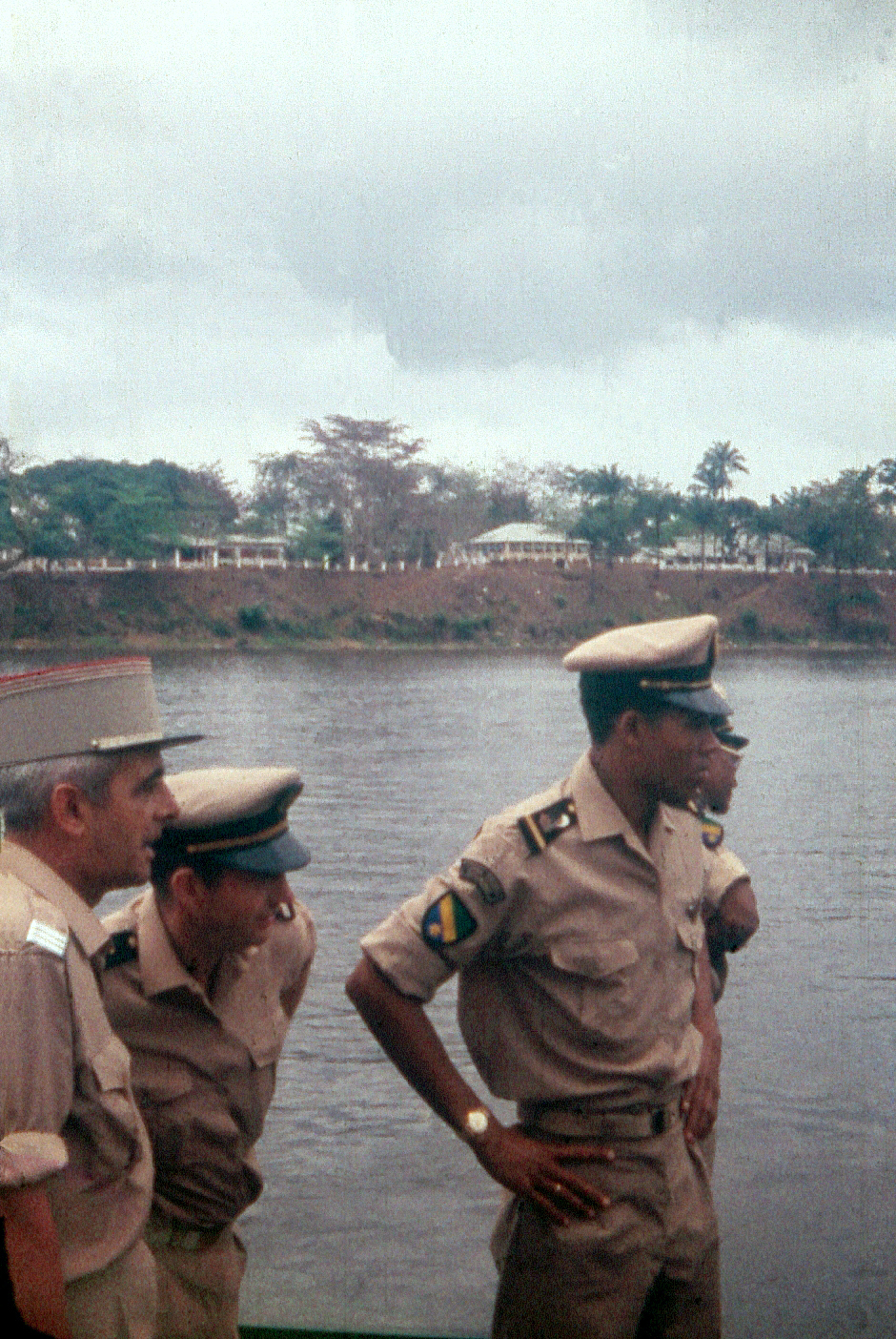
Gabonese and French military officers

During the night of 17 February and the early morning of 18 February 1964, 150 members of the Gabonese military, gendarmerie, and police, headed by Lieutenant Jacques Mombo and Valére Essone, seized the presidential palace. They arrested President of the National Assembly Louis Bigmann, French commanders Claude Haulin and Major Royer, several ministers, and President M'ba, who was dragged from his bed at gunpoint. On Radio Libreville, the military announced to the Gabonese people that a coup d'état had taken place, and that they required technical assistance and told the French not interfere in this matter. M'ba was instructed to broadcast a speech acknowledging his defeat. "The D-Day is here, the injustices are beyond measure, these people are patient, but their patience has limits", he said. "It came to a boil."

During these events, no gunshots were fired. The people did not react strongly, which according to the military, was a sign of approval. A provisional government was formed, and the presidency was offered to Aubame. The government was composed of civilian politicians from both the UDSG and BDG, such as Paul Gondjout. As for the coup plotters, they were content to ensure security for civilians. The small Gabonese army did not intervene in the coup; composed mostly of French officers, they remained in their barracks.

Aubame was unaware of the coup until the French ambassador to Gabon, Paul Cousseran, called him on the telephone roughly a half hour after sunrise. Cousseran, meanwhile, was awoken by the noisy streets and checked to see what was happening. Aubame replied that he was to find out why there was "no government", as Cousseran never directly mentioned a coup. However, about midway through the morning an automobile carrying the revolutionary committee arrived at Aubame's residence and drove him to the governmental offices, where he had been named president.

Second Lieutenant Ndo Edou gave instructions to transfer M'ba to Ndjolé, Aubame's electoral stronghold. However, due to heavy rain, the deposed president and his captors took shelter in an unknown village. The next morning they decided to take him over the easier road to Lambaréné. Several hours later, they returned to Libreville. The new head of government quickly contacted French ambassador Paul Cousseran, to assure him that the property of foreign nationals would be protected and to ask him to prevent any French military intervention.

In Paris, French president Charles de Gaulle decided otherwise. M'ba was one of the most loyal allies to France in Africa. While visiting France in 1961, M'ba said: "[a]ll Gabonese have two fatherlands: France and Gabon." Moreover, under his regime, Europeans enjoyed particularly friendly treatment. Therefore, President de Gaulle, upon advice from his chief adviser on African policy, Jacques Foccart, decided that he would restore the legitimate government. This was in accordance with a 1960 treaty between Gabon and the French, which was ironically signed by Aubame in his stint as Foreign Minister. Intervention could not commence without a formal request to the Head of State of Gabon. Since M'ba was otherwise occupied, the French contacted the Vice President of Gabon, Paul-Marie Yembit, who had not been arrested. However, he remained unaccounted for; therefore, they decided to compose a predated letter that Yembit would later sign, confirming their intervention. Less than 24 hours later, French troops stationed in Dakar and Brazzaville landed in Libreville and restored M'ba to power. Over the course of the operation, one French soldier was killed, while 15 to 25 died on the Gabonese side.

== Trial at Lambaréné ==
Aubame and Gondjout fled Libreville as fugitives, though were eventually discovered. In August, the trial of the military rebels and provisional government was opened in Lambaréné. A "state of precations" was enacted, which decreed that the local government maintained surveillance over suspected troublemakers and, if necessary, order a curfew. Special permits were required to travel through the town. The trial was held in a school building overlooking the Ogooue River, near Albert Schweitzer's hospital. Space was limited, so there was no representative section of the public. One needed a permit to witness the trial, and family members were restricted to one each. Press coverage was limited, and journalists were only allowed if they were representing a high-profile news agency. In addition, there were restrictions on the defence of the accused.

The prosecution called 64 witnesses to the trial. Essone, Mbene, and Aubame claimed that their involvement in the coup was due to a lack of development in the Gabonese army. Judge Leon Auge, the judge in the case, said that if "that is the only reason for your coup d'état, you deserve a severe penalty." Aubame affirmed his position that he did not participate in its planning. According to him, he formed the provisional government in a constitutional manner, at the request of some "putschists". He stated that the French intervention was an illegal act of interference, an assertion that Gondjout and Jean Mare Ekoh, a former education minister, shared.

On 9 September, the judge came to a verdict without consulting M'ba. Aubame was sentenced to 10 years of hard labor and 10 years of exile on a remote island off Settecama, 100 miles (161 km) down the coast of Gabon, as were most criminals of the case. He was not particularly popular during his political career, though according to Time, his arrest "ballooned him to heroic proportions in the eyes of the aroused public". While serving his 10 years of labor, he was beaten regularly by prison guards. Besides Aubame, M'ba imprisoned more than 150 of his opponents, most of whom were sentenced to 20 years of hard labor. The actor and the doctor were given 10 years of imprisonment each. While appealing for peace on 18 February, he pledged "no pardon or pity" to his enemies, but rather "total punishment".

== Later life ==
M'ba's successor as President, Omar Bongo, allowed the return of Aubame to Gabon in 1972. Afterward, Aubame lived in Paris and removed himself from the world of politics. He did visit Libreville in 1981, on which occasion Bongo appointed him "special adviser"—a mostly honorary post. Although not a supporter of the Movement for National Renewal (MORENA), his home was bombed on 12 December 1984 by anti-MORENA extremists. Aubame and his family barely escaped harm.

Aubame, whom journalist Ronald Matthews described as having "a curiously harsh voice, a severe appearance, and... a stern character", died in 1989 in Libreville. The French journalist Pierre Péan said that Aubame's training "as a practicing Catholic and a customs official helped to make him an integrated man, one of whom political power was not an end in itself." Michael C. Reed speculates that, had Aubame become president instead of M'ba, he might have made the country more democratic. After his death, a Libreville high school was established in his name.

== Awards and decorations ==
- Médaille de la Résistance
- Commandeur de la Légion d'honneur
- l'Étoile équatoriale (Gabon)
- l'Étoile africaine (Libéria)
- l'Ordre libérien de la Rédemption africaine
- l'Ordre national du Mérite du Niger
- l'Ordre national du Mérite centrafricain
- l'Ordre national du Mérite de Côte-d'Ivoire
- l'Ordre national du Tchad
- l'Étoile noire du Bénin

== Notes ==
Preceded by André Gustave Anguilé	Foreign Minister of Gabon; 1961–1963	Succeeded by Jean François Ondo
