= Mbulu Ngulu =

Mbulu Ngulu are figures made of wood and brass or copper decorating reliquary bundles of the Kota people. Their main purpose is to protect the relics of ancestors from evil, and to serve as visual representation of their power and prestige.

== History ==
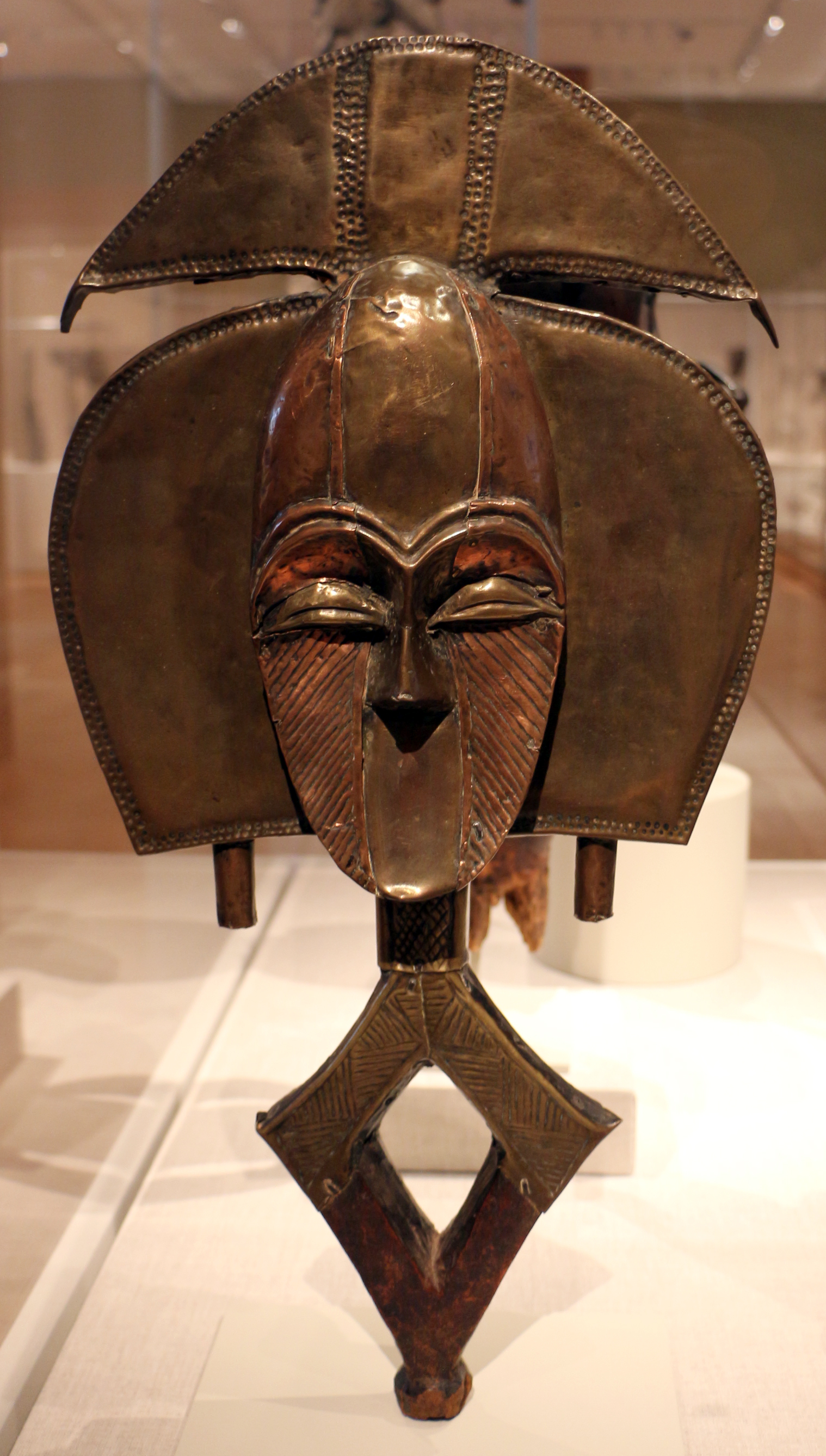
Photography of a Mbulu Ngulu held at the Art Institute of Chicago.

The Kota people participate in the cult of ancestors, a spiritual practice common to a variety of people in Equatorial Africa, notably to those taking part in Bwiti spiritual beliefs. To them, the remains of relatives who stood out during their life for either their position in society or abilities were imbued with the powers those people showed during their lives. Such ancestors could have been, for example, special leaders, warriors, artists or particularly fertile women. In conserving the skulls, bones and objects that were thought to either also be imbued with those powers or to emphasize the power held by the remains, those participating in the cult of ancestor would ensure that such powers could be used towards the protection of descendants.

Because the Kota engaged in slash-and-burn-agriculture, they relocated every 5 to 7 years. This meant that their reverence to ancestors could not be tied to ancestral shrines at gravesites. To remedy this issue, the Kota began preserving the remains of their ancestors in reliquary bundles called bwete. The bones and relics of ancestors would be tied into a packet and attached to the base of a figure, the Mbulu Ngulu.

The first examples of Mbulu Ngulu arrived to France and Germany during the end of the 19th century, yet most remaining exemplars are believed to be older than this due to both the ancient exploitation of copper mines in the region, and some of the symbolism used on the sculpture being believed to be inspired by the region’s conversion to Catholicism by the end of the 15th century.

The creation of the reliquary figures is believed to have stopped by the 1930s. This is largely due to the aggressive work of Christian missionaries and their ban by French colonial authorities. As a consequence, many Mbulu Ngulu were burned or buried in the early 20th century.

== Symbolism ==
Despite being based on the human face, the Mbulu Ngulu are not created as a representation of the ancestor whose remains they protect. To most, they appear as a visual representation of the lineage they are tied to – an abstract non-human spiritual force rather than an individual in particular.

Due to being rooted in a spiritual practice, a lot of symbolism is tied to the Mbulu Ngulu. Already at the time of its creation, the craftsmanship required for the skillful combination of wood and metals that come to shape the figure can be considered a first form of spiritual intercession. In fact, in African sculptural traditions, such a combination of wood and hammered metal is unique to the Mbulu Ngulu and other similar reliquary artefacts of the region.

The use of copper and brass in creating the Mbulu Ngulu is of particular interest to its symbolism. Prior to colonial powers requiring the use of coinage in Central Africa, copper was the main form of currency in Central Africa. Its use on the figures therefore hints at the social value of the sculpture, as well as its spiritual value in embodying a notion of prosperity.

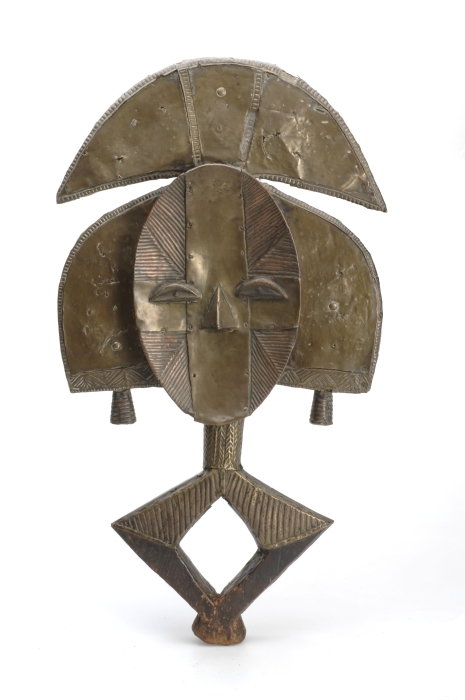
Mbulu Ngulu on which the alternating use of brass and copper allow to differentiate elements of the figure.

The aesthetic quality of the metals also plays an important role in the symbolism of the figures. The metals would be scrubbed often so as to ensure that they would preserve their lustre. Indeed, their shine would have two forms of association. On the one hand, the reflectivity would echo the shimmer of water. This would make the figure a conduit for communication with the dead, or simply represent the separation between the world of the living and the dead, with the supernatural realm often being thought to exist under or beyond seas, rivers, and other bodies of water. On the other hand, the reflexivity of the material would play an important role in protecting the remains of the ancestors, its shine being thought to scare away evils.

Interpretations regarding the shape of the figures vary greatly among scholars. Where some see the crescent shapes above and on the sides of the face as suggesting a special hairdo, some believe it to be a hat. Similarly, the cylindrical pendants often present on the side of the sculpture have been interpreted as either ear ornaments or as referring to traditional hairstyles. The meaning of the lozenge forming the base of the sculpture has also been interpreted differently, sometimes as a torso, sometimes as arms.

Regardless of the chosen interpretation of the form, most scholars seem to agree that the figurative and abstract shapes of the Mbulu Ngulu provide to the sculpture a certain rhythmic energy, its shape therefore reinforcing its perception as a powerful and potent object.

== Spiritual Practice ==
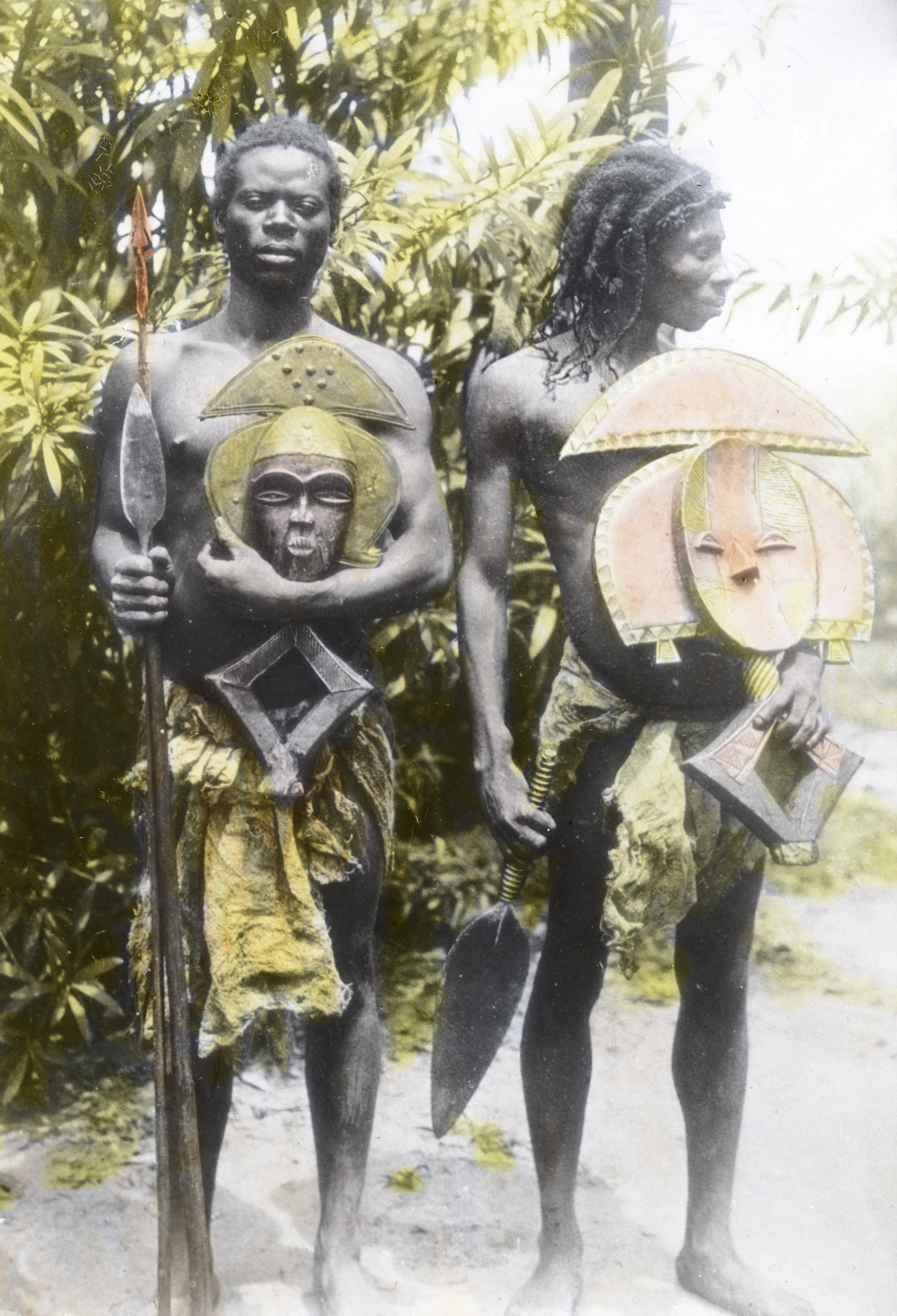
Two Kota men holding Mbulu Ngulu figures. Photography held at the Museum of Ethnography, Sweden

The Mbulu Ngulu, as part of the bwete reliquary bundles would either be kept in the house of the family or leader belonging to the same lineage, or placed in small huts away from daily life. While their day-to-day purpose was to protect the relics, the Mbulu Ngulu could serve as effective agents in a variety of rituals. Ancestors would be called upon to remedy social crises, ensure health, fertility, or successful hunting and trading. Some men also used the bwete as an insurance against their wife’s infidelity. It was believed that placing pieces of her clothing inside the reliquary would drive an unfaithful wife mad.

The figures would also play an essential role in initiation rituals for young men. The bundles as a whole would be used as a representation of a transfer of the family history from one generation to the next, while the Mbulu Ngulu would serve as visual evidence of the power of the relics, helping the young men better grasp the extent of their potency.

The power held in different bundles could also be aggregated if neighbouring communities believed they had to come together to face danger. With the Mbulu Ngulu as a symbolic portrait of the lineages comprising the communities, their bringing together would strengthen notions of allyship. The shiny figures would then work jointly to ward off menaces to the community, while ceremonies involving feasts, dances and the making of medicines for protection would take place.
