= Brigitte Onkanowa =

Gabonese military woman and politician

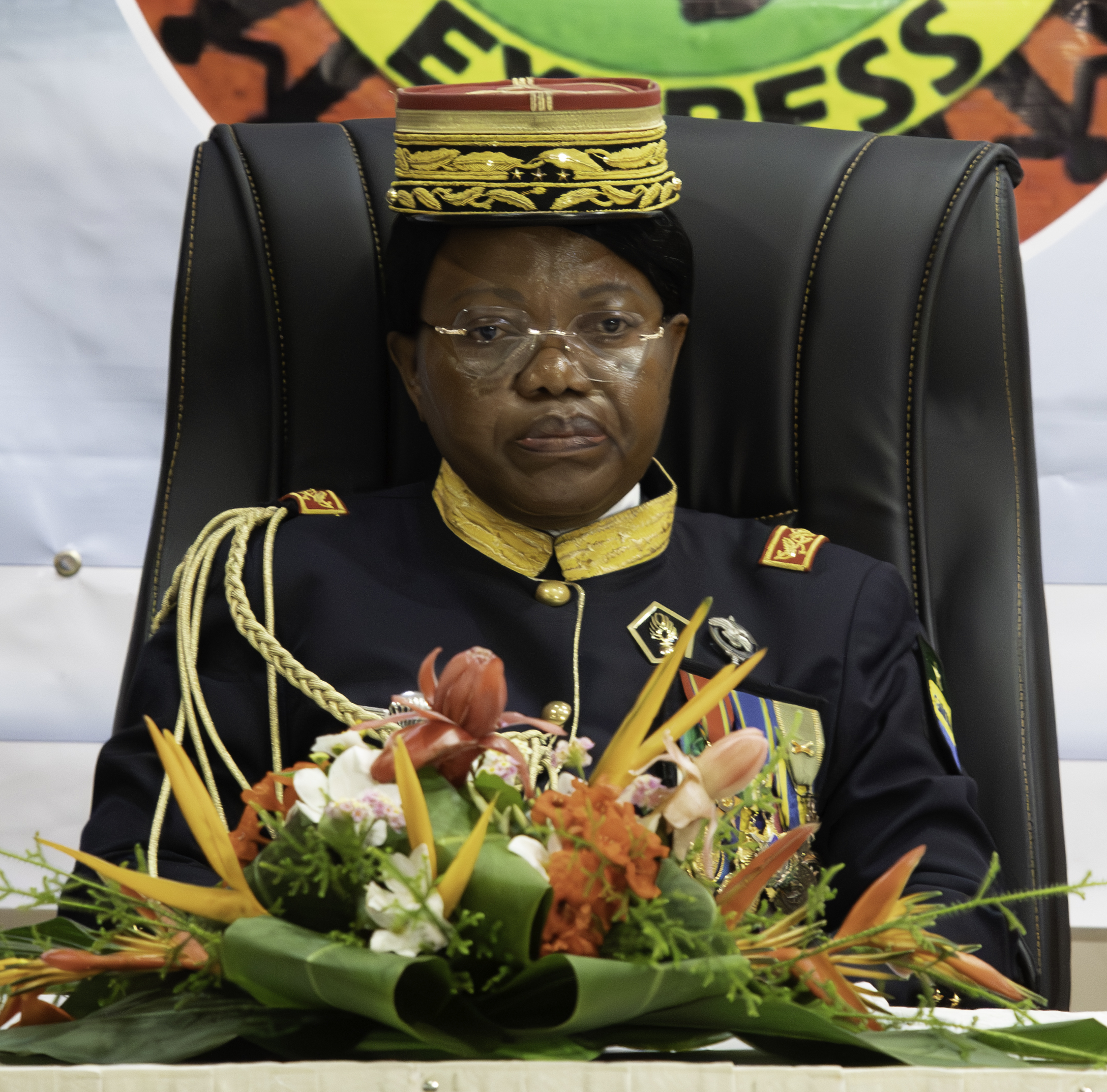

Minister of National Defence
- Incumbent
- Assumed office 17 January 2024
- President: Brice Oligui Nguema
- Preceded by: Félicité Ongouori Ngoubili

Personal details
- Born: Okodja, Haut-Ogooué Province, Gabon

Brigitte Onkanowa (also spelled Onganoa) is a General in the Armed Forces of Gabon who has served as the country's National Defence Minister since January 2024.

Onkanowa was born in Okodja in Haut-Ogooué Province. In 2018, she was the first woman promoted to the rank of Brigadier General within the National Gendarmerie of Gabon.

After the August 2023 coup by the Gabonese armay deposed President Ali Bongo, she was appointed Minister Delegate to the Presidency by transitional President Brice Oligui Nguema. She was announced as Minister of National Defense on 17 January 2024 by transitional Prime Minister Raymond Ndong Sima. This made her the first woman to head the armed forces in a Central African country. She was reappointed in 2025 and 2026.
