= Michaël Moussa Adamo =

Gabonese politician and diplomat (1961–2023)

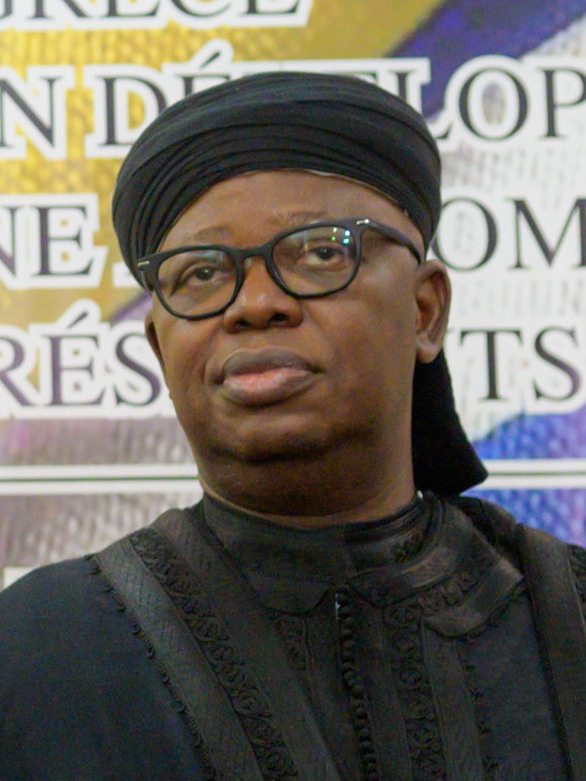
- Adamo in 2023

Minister for Foreign Affairs
- In office March 2022 – 20 January 2023
- President: Ali Bongo Ondimba
- Preceded by: Pacôme Moubelet-Boubeya
- Succeeded by: Hermann Immongault

Minister of National Defense
- In office January 2020 – March 2022
- President: Ali Bongo Ondimba
- Preceded by: Rose Christiane Raponda
- Succeeded by: Félicité Ongouori Ngoubili

Ambassador to the United States
- In office 2011 – January 2020
- President: Ali Bongo Ondimba
- Preceded by: Carlos Victor Boungou
- Succeeded by: Noël Nelson Messone

Personal details
- Born: 10 January 1961 Makokou, Gabon
- Died: 20 January 2023 (aged 62) Gabon
- Party: Gabonese Democratic Party

Michaël Moussa Adamo (10 January 1961 – 20 January 2023) was a Gabonese politician and diplomat.

== Career ==
Moussa Adamo was born on 10 January 1961 in Makokou. He started out as a presenter on national television. In 2000, he was made chief of staff of defense minister Ali Bongo Ondimba. When Bongo was elected president in 2009, he served as Bongo's special adviser. Moussa Adamo served as Gabon's ambassador to the United States from 2011 to 2020. After, he served as Minister of National Defense from 2020 to 2022. He later became foreign minister. He died on 20 January 2023 after a heart attack while waiting to go into a cabinet meeting.
