= Missiroli =

Missiroli is an Italian surname. Notable people with the surname include:

- Antonio Missiroli (born 1955), Italian researcher, editorialist, lecturer and policy adviser in the European Institutions
- Mario Missiroli (1934–2014), Italian stage, television and film director
- Simone Missiroli (born 1986), Italian footballer
