= Engone =

Engone is a surname. Notable people with the surname include:

- Basile Mvé Engone (born 1941), Gabonese Roman Catholic archbishop
- Jean Engone (born 1932), Gabonese politician
