= Jules-Marius Ogouebandja =

Gabonese political figure (born 1950)

Jules-Marius Ogouebandja (born 19 April 1950) is a Gabonese political figure who served for a time as Gabon's Ambassador to the United States and later served as Executive Secretary of the National Agency of National Parks.

Ogouebandja was born in Libreville. From 1979 to 1987, he worked at the North America, South America, and Africa Department of the Ministry of Foreign Affairs and Cooperation, first as Director of Studies (Chargé d'études) and then as Director of the Department. He was Ambassador to Italy, Greece, Turkey, and Cyprus from 1987 to 1992 and then Ambassador to Spain from 1992 to 2001. He was appointed as Ambassador to the United States on 26 September 2001 and presented his credentials on 10 October 2001. Later, he was appointed by the government of Gabon as Executive Secretary of the National Agency of National Parks, in addition to his role as High Commissioner at the Presidency of the Republic, on 24 July 2008.
