= List of ambassadors of Gabon to the United States =

Ambassador of Gabon to the United States
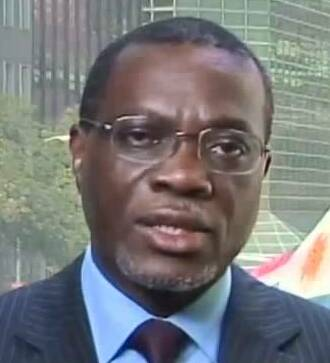
- Incumbent; Noel Nelson Messone since December 12, 2022
- Inaugural holder: Joseph Ngoua
- Formation: March 22, 1961

The Gabonese ambassador in Washington, D. C. is the official representative of the Government in Libreville to the Government of the United States.

Ambassador Noel Nelson Messone presented his credentials on December 12, 2022.

== List of representatives ==
Diplomatic agrément	Diplomatic accreditation	Ambassador	Observations	President of Gabon	President of the United States	Term end
March 22, 1961			Embassy opened	Léon M'ba	John F. Kennedy	
March 4, 1961	March 22, 1961	Joseph Ngoua		Léon M'ba	John F. Kennedy	
December 5, 1961	January 10, 1962	Jules Mbah		Léon M'ba	John F. Kennedy	
September 9, 1963	October 21, 1963	Aristide Isembe		Léon M'ba	Lyndon B. Johnson	
July 14, 1966	July 22, 1966	Louis Owanga		Léon M'ba	Lyndon B. Johnson	
December 21, 1967	January 19, 1968	Leonard Antoine Badinga		Omar Bongo	Lyndon B. Johnson	
January 9, 1970	February 3, 1970	Gaston Robert Bouckat-Bou-Niziengui		Omar Bongo	Richard Nixon	
July 23, 1973	July 26, 1973	Vincent Mavoungou		Omar Bongo	Richard Nixon	
September 30, 1976	November 24, 1976	Rene Kombila		Omar Bongo	Gerald Ford	
January 25, 1978	February 15, 1978	Jean-Daniel Mambouka		Omar Bongo	Jimmy Carter	
November 3, 1978	January 11, 1979	Jose-Joseph Amiar		Omar Bongo	Jimmy Carter	
July 18, 1980	August 22, 1980	Aboubacar Bokoko		Omar Bongo	Jimmy Carter	
November 12, 1981	December 8, 1981	Hubert Ondias-Souna		Omar Bongo	Ronald Reagan	
November 10, 1982	November 22, 1982	Mocktar Georges Abdoulaye-Mbinqt		Omar Bongo	Ronald Reagan	
September 9, 1986	November 21, 1986	Jean-Robert Odzaga		Omar Bongo	Ronald Reagan	
April 26, 1991	June 11, 1991	Alexandre Sambat		Omar Bongo	George H. W. Bush	
June 23, 1993	September 3, 1993	Paul Boundoukou-Latha		Omar Bongo	Bill Clinton	
September 26, 2001	October 10, 2001	Jules-Marius Ogouebandja		Omar Bongo	George W. Bush	
January 14, 2008	January 22, 2008	Carlos Victor Boungou	Ambassador in Manila	Omar Bongo	George W. Bush	
September 2, 2011	September 9, 2011	Michael Moussa-Adamo		Ali Bongo Ondimba	Barack Obama	
