= Minister for Foreign Affairs (Gabon) =

The Minister for Foreign Affairs of Gabon is a government minister in charge of the Ministry for Foreign Affairs of Gabon, responsible for conducting foreign relations of the country.

The following is a list of foreign ministers of Gabon since its founding in 1960:

No.	Name (Birth–Death)	Portrait	Tenure
1	André Gustave Anguilé (1920–1999)		1960–1961
2	Jean-Hilaire Aubame (1912–1989)		1961–1963
3	Jean François Ondo (1916–1972)		1963
4	Joseph Ngoua (1923–1999)		1963–1964
5	Jean-Marc Ekoh (1929–2022)		1964
6	Léon M'ba (1902–1967)		1964
7	Pierre Auguste Avaro (1911–?)		1964–1965
8	Jean Engone (b. 1932)		1965–1967
9	Jean Marie M'ba		1967
10	Benjamin Ngoubou (1925–2008)		1967–1968
11	Paul Malékou (b. 1938)		1968
12	Jean Rémy Ayouné (1914–1992)		1968–1971
13	Georges Rawiri (1932–2006)		1971–1974
14	Paul Okoumba d'Okwatsegue (1933–2020)		1974–1976
15	Martin Bongo (b. 1940) (Note: Nephew of President Omar Bongo.)		1976–1989
16	Ali Bongo (b. 1959) (Note: Son of President Omar Bongo.)		1989–1991
19	Pascaline Bongo Ondimba (b. 1956) (Note: Daughter of President Omar Bongo.)		1991–1994
20	Jean Ping (b. 1942)		1994
21	Casimir Oyé-Mba (1942–2021)		1994–1999
(20)	Jean Ping (b. 1942)		1999–2008
22	Laure Olga Gondjout (b. 1953)		2008
23	Paul Toungui (b. 1950) (Note: Husband of Pascaline Bongo.)		2008–2012
24	Emmanuel Issoze-Ngondet (1961–2020)		2012–2016
25	Pacôme Moubelet-Boubeya (b. 1963)		2016–2017
26	Noël Nelson Messone (b. 1960)		2017–2018
27	Régis Immongault Tatangani		2018–2019
28	Abdu Razzaq Guy Kambogo (b. 1974)		2019
29	Alain Claude Bilie By Nze (b. 1967)		2019–2020
(25)	Pacôme Moubelet-Boubeya (b. 1963)		2020–2022
30	Michael Moussa Adamo (1961–2023)		2022–2023
—	Hermann Immongault (b. 1972) Acting Minister		2023
—	Yolande Nyonda (b. 1965) Acting Minister		2023
31	Hermann Immongault (b. 1972)		2023
32	Régis Onanga Ndiaye (b. 1966)		2023–2025
33	Marie-Édith Tassyla-Ye-Doumbeneny (b. 1972)		2026–present
