= Ministry of National Defense (Gabon) =

Ministry of National Defence
- Ministère de la Défense nationale du Gabon (French)
- Coat of arms of Gabon

Agency overview
- Jurisdiction: Government of Gabon
- Minister responsible: Brigitte Onkanowa
- Website: Official website

The Ministry of National Defence (French: Ministère de la Défense nationale du Gabon) is a ministry of the Government of Gabon. This ministry is responsible for military and defence of the country. Although the President of Gabon has authority over all of the Military of Gabon, the Defence Ministry administers it. However, in practice the president has held the control over the military since 1967.

== Ministers of National Defence ==
- Jean François Ondo, 1960-1963
- Pierre Avaro, 1963-1965
- Omar Bongo, 1965-1981
- Julien Mpouho Epigat, 1981-1990
- Martin Fidèle Magnaga, 1990-1994
- Idriss Ngari, 1994-1999
- Ali Bongo, 1999-2009
- Angélique Ngoma, 2009-2011
- Pacôme-Rufin Ondzounga, 2011-2014
- Ernest Mpouho Epigat, 2014-2015
- Mathias Otounga Ossibadjouo, 2015-2016
- Etienne Massard Kabinda Makaga, 2016-2019
- Rose Christiane Ossouka Raponda, 2019-2020
- Michaël Moussa Adamo, 2020-2022
- Félicité Ongouori Ngoubili, 2022-2023
- Brigitte Onkanowa 2024-current

== See also ==
- Cabinet of Gabon
- Armed Forces of Gabon
