= Jean Marie M'ba =

Gabonese politician

Jean Marie M'ba was the foreign minister of Gabon for a period in 1967.

| Preceded by Jean Engone | Foreign Minister of Gabon; 1967 | Succeeded by Benjamin Ngoubou |
