= Antonio Missiroli =

Antonio Missiroli (born 1955 in Modena) is an Italian scholar, policy analyst, journalist and former international civil servant who writes and teaches on European and transatlantic security. He was Director of the European Union Institute for Security Studies (EUISS) from 2012 to 2017 and, from December 2017 to October 2020, NATO Assistant Secretary General for Emerging Security Challenges.

Before joining NATO he was a policy adviser at the European Commission and a researcher and director of studies at think tanks in Rome, Paris and Brussels. He is a Senior Advisor at the Italian Institute for International Political Studies (ISPI) and teaches at Sciences Po in Paris and SAIS Europe in Bologna.

== Early life and education ==
Missiroli was born in Modena in 1955. He holds a PhD in contemporary history from the Scuola Normale Superiore di Pisa, awarded in 1997, and a master's degree in international public policy from the Johns Hopkins University School of Advanced International Studies (SAIS). In 1996–97 he was a British Council Visiting Fellow at St Antony's College, Oxford.

== Career ==
=== Early career ===
Missiroli worked as a professional journalist and commentator on European affairs and was Head of European Studies at the Centro Studi di Politica Internazionale (CeSPI) in Rome from 1994 to 1997. He also lectured in West European politics at Dickinson College.

=== Think tanks and the European Commission ===
From 1998 to 2005 Missiroli was a research fellow and later senior research fellow at the Institute for Security Studies in Paris, which until 2002 was an institute of the Western European Union and has since been the EU Institute for Security Studies. From 2005 to 2010 he was Director of Studies at the European Policy Centre in Brussels. He joined the board (Direktorium) of the Institute for European Politics in Berlin in 2006.

From 2010 to 2012 he was an adviser at the Bureau of European Policy Advisers (BEPA) of the European Commission, responsible for relations with think tanks and research centres and for publications.

=== Director of the EU Institute for Security Studies ===
In September 2012 the board of the EUISS appointed Missiroli as director. The appointment was made on the proposal of EU High Representative Catherine Ashton. Italy's Ministry of Foreign Affairs called his election an important recognition for Italy.

Missiroli led the institute from October 2012 to November 2017. He also chaired the Executive Academic Board of the European Security and Defence College from 2015 to 2017. In 2015 he edited Towards an EU Global Strategy, a EUISS volume published during the consultation that preceded the EU Global Strategy, with a preface by High Representative Federica Mogherini. In 2017 he co-authored, with Daniel Fiott and Thierry Tardy, a Chaillot Paper on Permanent Structured Cooperation (PeSCo) in EU defence.

=== NATO ===
Missiroli became NATO Assistant Secretary General for Emerging Security Challenges in December 2017 and held the post until 31 October 2020. The Emerging Security Challenges Division runs, among other things, the Science for Peace and Security Programme, which addresses issues such as cyber defence, counter-terrorism, CBRN defence, energy security and advanced technologies.

=== Since 2020 ===
After leaving NATO, Missiroli became a non-resident associate fellow at the NATO Defense College in Rome and, in 2021, Associate Senior Policy Fellow for Emerging Security Threats at the Institute of Security and Global Affairs of Leiden University. He was also a Distinguished Adjunct Professor at the Brussels School of Governance. as of 2026, he is a Senior Advisor at ISPI in Milan and, at SAIS Europe, an adjunct professor and associate fellow. He also comments on European security in the Italian media, including Formiche.net, and has written opinion pieces for the newspaper Domani.

=== Teaching and affiliations ===
Missiroli has taught at the universities of Bath, Trento and Boston, at SAIS, at the College of Europe in Bruges, at Sciences Po in Paris and at the Scuola Superiore Sant'Anna in Pisa. He currently teaches at Sciences Po, at SAIS Europe and at the EU Diplomatic Academy in Bruges. He has also been an Honorary Fellow of the European Security and Defence College and a Distinguished Visiting Fellow of the German Marshall Fund.

== Selected works ==
- La questione tedesca (1991)
- Dove nascono le élites (Reset, 1997)
- "CFSP, Defence and Flexibility", Chaillot Paper 38, WEU Institute for Security Studies, 2000
- "The Central Europeans between the EU and NATO", Survival, vol. 46, no. 4, 2004
- "European Football Cultures and their Integration: The 'Short' Twentieth Century", Culture, Sport, Society, vol. 5, no. 1, 2002
- La difesa europea, with Alessandro Pansa (Il Nuovo Melangolo, 2007)
- Towards an EU Global Strategy: Background, Process, References (editor, EUISS, 2015)
- Permanent Structured Cooperation: What's in a name?, with Daniel Fiott and Thierry Tardy, Chaillot Paper 142, EUISS, 2017
- L'Europa come potenza: diplomazia, sicurezza e difesa (il Mulino, 2022)
- Games of Peace and War: The Olympics and International Politics, CSDS Policy Brief, no. 21, 2024
- La difesa dell'Europa: Chi garantisce la sicurezza del continente? (Mondadori, 2024)
- Defending Europe: Transatlantic and European Security from Truman to Trump (Ledizioni, 2025), a revised and updated English edition of La difesa dell'Europa
