= Jean Engone =

Foreign Minister of Gabon

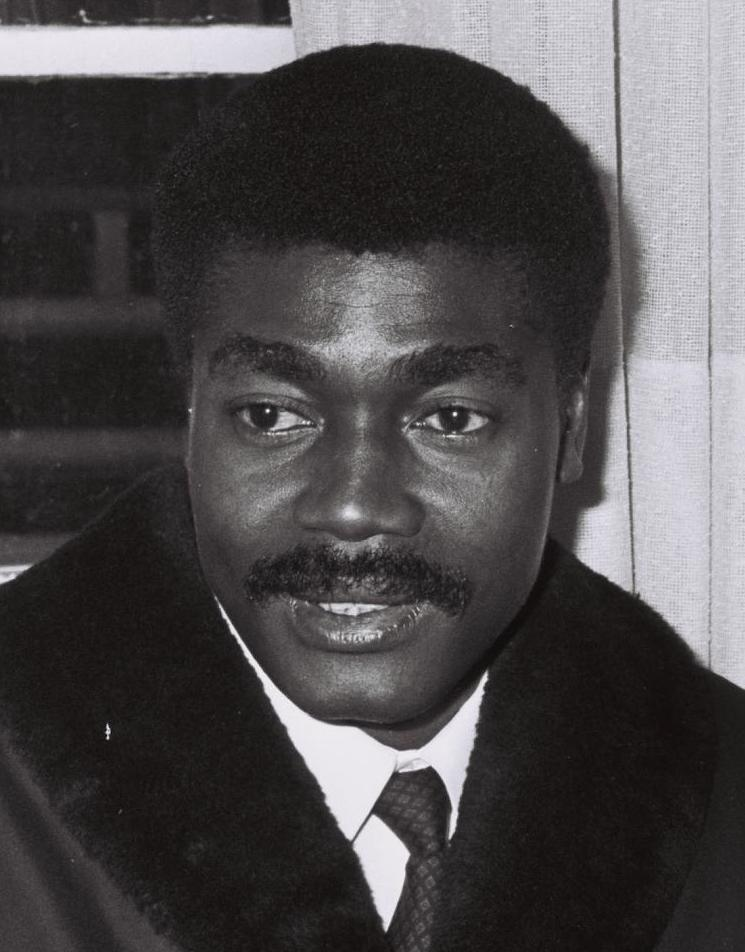
- Jean Engone, 1967

Foreign Minister of Gabon
- In office 1965–1967

Personal details
- Born: January 1, 1932

Jean Engone (born 1 January 1932) was the foreign minister of Gabon for 1965 to 1967, during the country’s early years of post-independence diplomacy.

Preceded by Pierre Auguste Avaro	Foreign Minister of Gabon; 1965–1967	Succeeded by Jean Marie M'ba
