= Pierre Avaro =

Gabonese politician

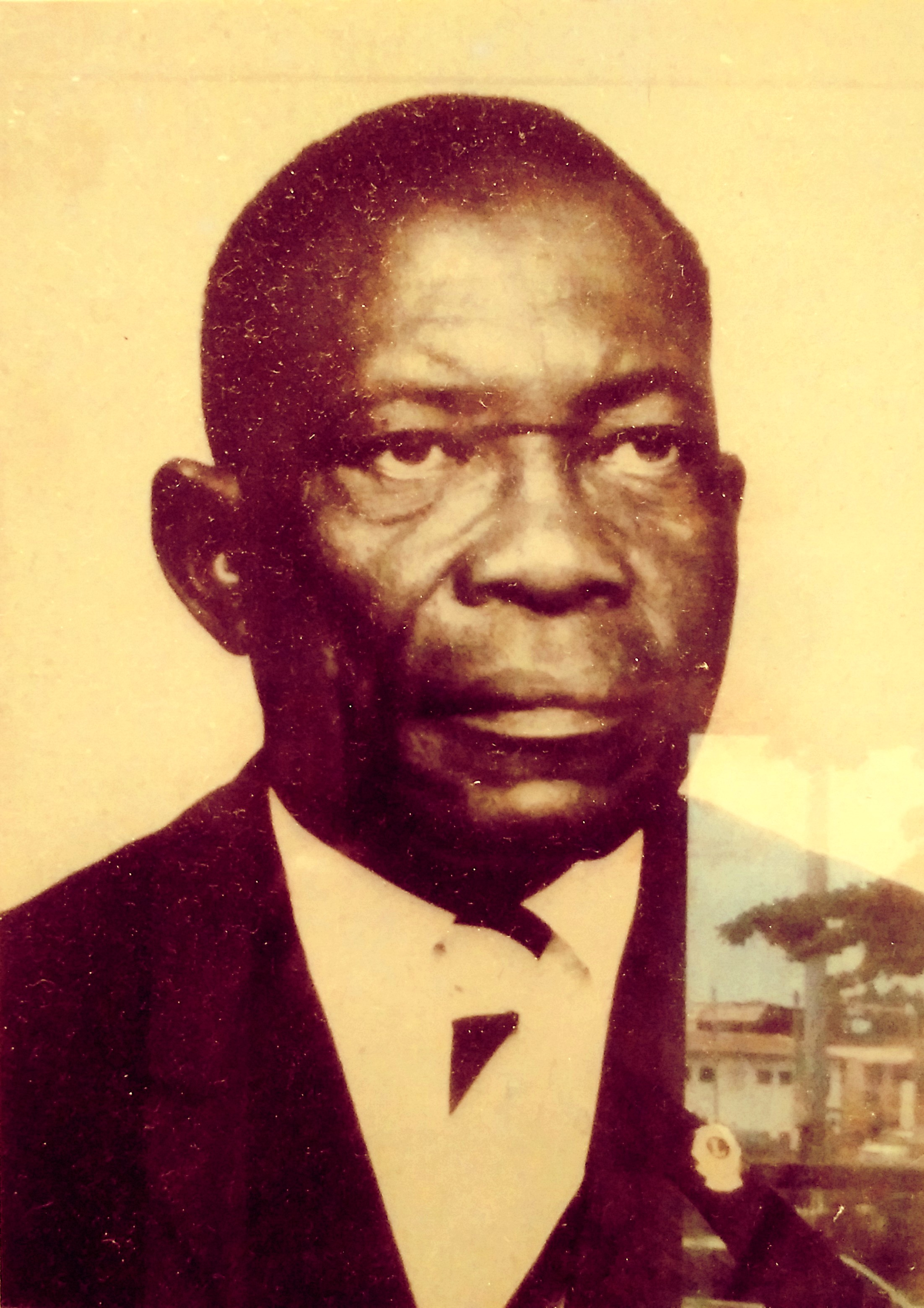
Pierre Auguste Avaro

Pierre Auguste Avaro (15 March 1911 in Port-Gentil–??) was a Gabonese politician.

He helped Léon M'ba to organize Gabonese Democratic Bloc (BDG) and served as the secretary-general of the party from 1960 to 1963. He was also an elected deputy in the National Assembly of Gabon. He held several ministerial portfolios between November 1960 and December 1966. He was the foreign minister of Gabon in 1964 to 1965. He was Minister of National Defense from 1963 to 1965.

Preceded by Léon M'ba	Foreign Minister of Gabon; 1964–1965	Succeeded by Benjamin Ngoubou
