= Kota people (Gabon) =

Bantu ethnic group

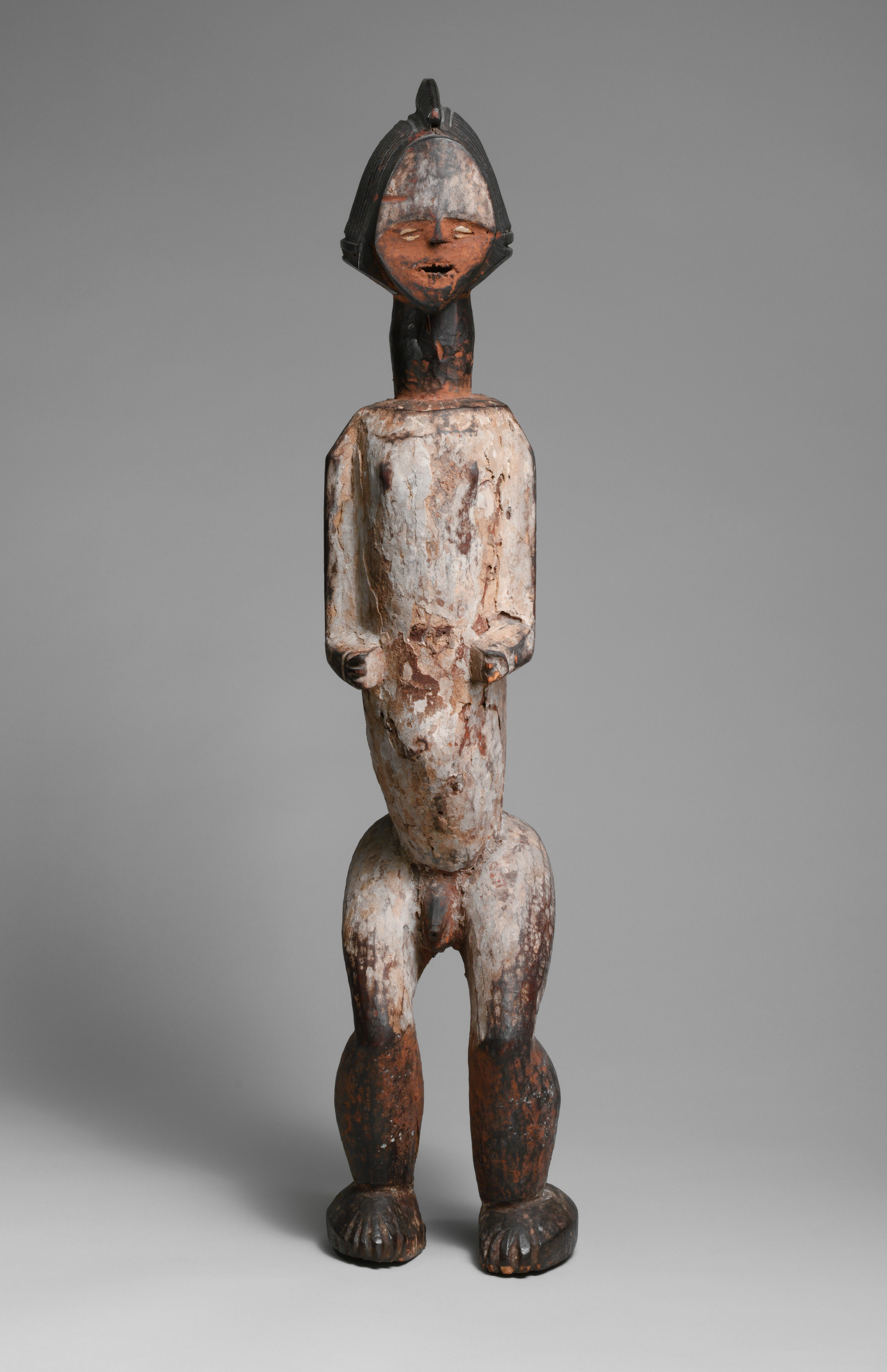
Standing male figure; 19th century; wood, pigment, metal & cowrie shells; height: 82.6 cm (32.5 in.); Metropolitan Museum of Art (New York City)

The Bakota (or Kota) are a Bantu ethnic group from the northeastern region of Gabon and Congo. The language they speak is called iKota, but is sometimes referred to as Bakota, ikuta, Kota, and among the Fang, they are known as Mekora. The language has several dialects, which include: Ndambomo, Mahongwe, Ikota-la-hua, Sake, Menzambi, Bougom. Some of these dialects themselves include regional variations of some kind.

== Culture ==
The Kota are traditionally a patriarchal society, however some of the sub-groups such as the Mahongwe have over time adopted a matrilineal system of lineage (Mahongwe means, "from your father"). Another key feature of the Kota people is the originality of its circumcision and widow-purification rituals, which are generally kept secret.

The true meaning of Bakota is unclear, however it may be derived from the word kota, which means to bind/to attach/to link, hereby suggesting they view themselves as a united people bound by a common fate.

Most Kota people are Roman Catholic. The area of Gabon they live in is home of the Apostolic Vicariate of Makokou.

== Population ==
Estimates indicate that there are at least 43,500 Kota speakers in the world, of whom 34,442 people (79%) live in the Ogouee-Ivindo province of northeastern Gabon, and 9055 people (21%) in neighboring Congo-Brazzaville. They make up the majority of the population of the regional capital city Makokou.

Politically, the Kota have been classified under the disputed "stateless societies" category. They have a strong egalitarian background, which in some instances cuts across age and gender lines. Kota children are taught to value tradition, respect for the elderly, and the concept of "Ewele" (loosely translated as 'pride').

== Mbulu Ngulu Reliquary Figures ==
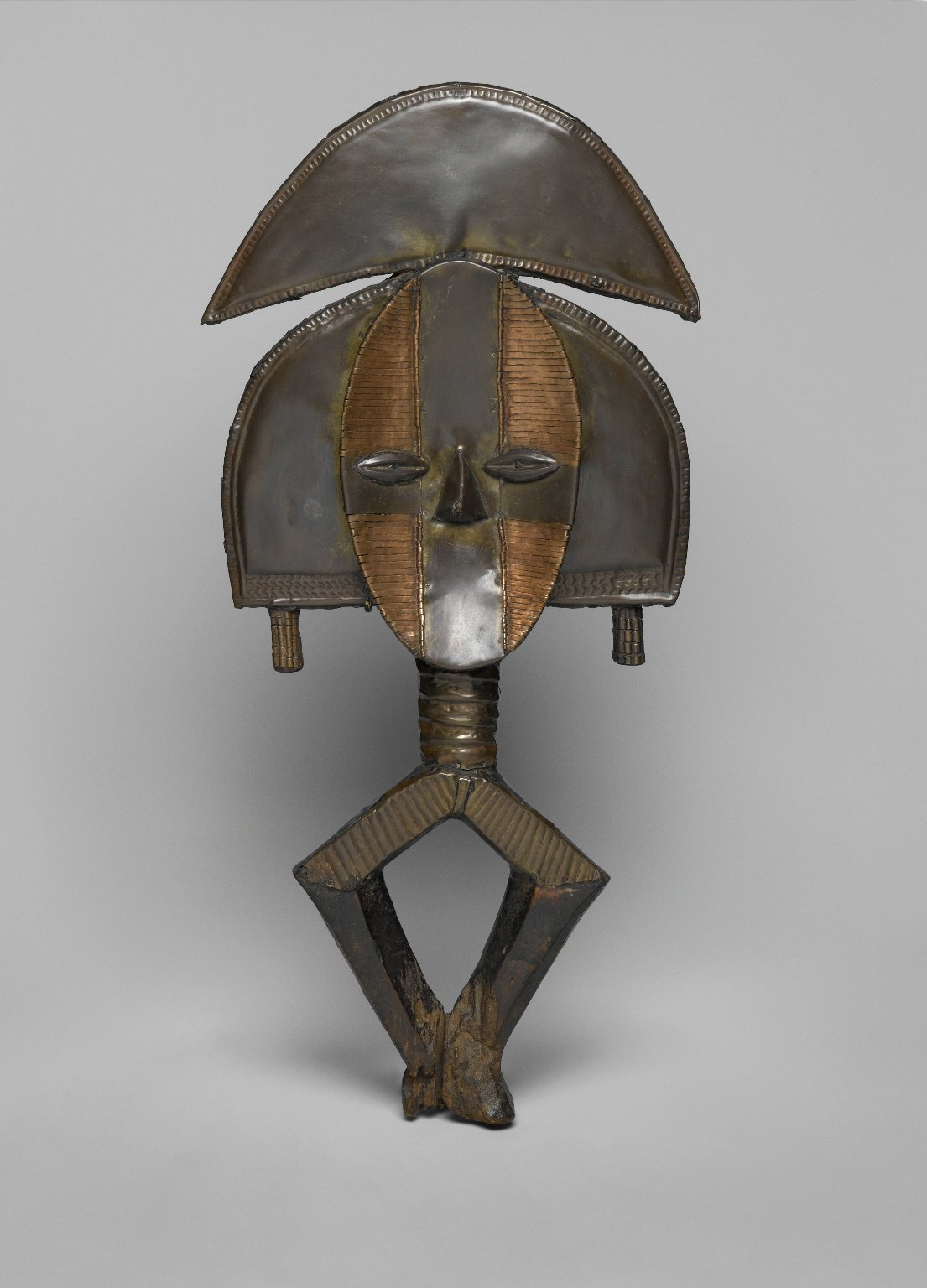
Brooklyn Museum 1989.51.2 Reliquary Guardian Figure Mbulu Ngulu

They are noted for their copper and brass reliquary guardian figures, which are part of a powerful religious and mystical order known as Bwete. However, it is unclear if these figures were made by the Kota people themselves, of other people living in the same area of Gabon. In the iKota language these figures are called mbulu ngulu. As the people of Gabon began to convert to Christianity in the 18th and 19th centuries, missionaries and colonial officials began to collect these figures. Today, most reliquary figures are found in museums in Europe and North America.

== Influential Kota People ==
The Kota are not considered big players in Gabonese politics, however some Kota have been appointed to key positions in the Government. Alexandre Sambat, a long-time ambassador to the United States who later ran for president in 1993, was of Kota origin. Pascal Desire Misongo, another Kota, has served as minister of Justice in Gabon. Emmanuel Issoze-Ngondet was an established representative in the United Nations and served as Prime Minister of Gabon as well.
