= Angélique Ngoma =

Gabonese politician

Angélique Ngoma is a Gabonese politician who served as Minister of National Defense from October 2009 to January 2011.

== Career ==
Ngoma was a national delegate of the Women's Union of the Gabonese Democratic Party. She served as Minister for Family, Child Welfare and Advancement of Women from 1999 until 2009. In October 2009, she was appointed Minister of National Defense by President Ali Bongo Ondimba, one of the few ministers to be reappointed. In 2011, she was appointed Minister of Labor, Employment and Social Welfare.

In June 2015, Ngoma was elected to the National Assembly for the second seat of Lower Banio. As of 2017, she is President of the Committee on Environment and Sustainable Development.
