= Jean François Ondo =

Gabonese politician

Jean François Ondo (1916–1972) was a Gabonese politician. He was Minister of National Defense from 1960 to 1963. He was the foreign minister of Gabon for a period in 1963.

Ondo died in 1972 in Oyem. A foundation in his name was established in 1984.

Preceded by Jean-Hilaire Aubame	Foreign Minister of Gabon; 1963	Succeeded by Joseph Ngoua
