= Paul Malékou =

Gabonese politician

Paul Malékou (born November 17, 1938) was the Foreign Minister of Gabon for a period in 1968. He was born in Fougamou, Gabon.

Malékou was Director-General of ASECNA from 1975 to 1983.

Preceded by Benjamin Ngoubou	Foreign Minister of Gabon; 1968	Succeeded by Jean Rémy Ayouné
