= Joseph Ngoua =

Gabonese politician

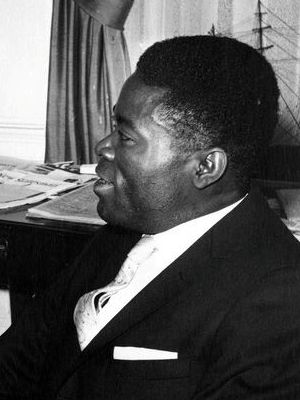
- Joseph Ngoua in March 1961

Gabonese Minister of Foreign Affairs
- In office 1963–1964

Gabonese Ambassador to the United States
- In office 1961

Personal details
- Born: 12 May 1923
- Died: August 1999 (aged 76)
- Occupation: Politician, diplomat

Joseph Ngoua (12 May 1923 – August 1999) was Ambassador of Gabon to the U.S. in 1961 and Gabon's foreign minister in 1963 to 1964.

Preceded by Jean François Ondo	Foreign Minister of Gabon; 1963-1964	Succeeded by Léon M'ba
