= Benjamin Ngoubou =

Gabonese politician

Benjamin Ngoubou (23 July 1925 – 15 March 2008) was the Foreign Minister of Gabon from 1967 to 1968. He also served as Minister of Labour and Social Affairs in 1967. He studied medicine at the University of Lyon and had worked as the head of the maternity/gynecology department at Libreville Hospital before becoming a government minister.

Preceded by Jean Marie M'ba	Foreign Minister of Gabon; 1967–1968	Succeeded by Paul Malékou
