= Constant-Serge Bounda =

Congolese diplomat

Constant-Serge Bounda (born 1966) is a Congolese national and United Nations Environment Programme (UNEP) Representative to the African Union, the United Nations Economic Commission for Africa (UNECA) and the Government of Ethiopia. He has been appointed as the United Nations Population Fund (UNFPA) Representative to the African Union, which he will assume on 1 October 2012.

== Personal background ==
Constant-Serge Bounda was born in 1966 in Brazzaville. He has earned degrees in information sciences from the National School of Information Science and Libraries (École Nationale Supérieure de Sciences de l'Information et des Bibliothèques [ENSSIB]) in Lyon, France, a degree in history from Lumière University Lyon 2, and a degree in documentation from the University of Dakar.

== Professional background ==
Serge Bounda began serving as the UNEP Representative to the African Union and the Government of Ethiopia on 1 June 2010. He has been appointed as the United Nations Population Fund Representative to the African Union, and the United Nations Economic Commission for Africa. He is expected to begin serving in this capacity on 1 October 2012.

In 2008, Bounda began serving as the head of UNEP's Support Office to the Nobel Peace Laureate, Goodwill Ambassador for the Congo Basin Forest Ecosystem and co-chair of the Congo Basin Forest Fund (CBFF) with Paul Martin, former Prime Minister of Canada. He assisted Wangari Maathai in her capacity as the President of the Economic, Social and Cultural Council of the African Union (AU-ECOSOCC) from 2005–2008.

Bounda also coordinated and led the implementation of the UNEP related projects in the Congo Basin such as the Mayombe Transboundary Initiative, aiming at creating a protected area/reserve of biosphere between the Democratic Republic of the Congo, Angola, and the Republic of the Congo. While working with the UNEP's support office, he assisted in raising US$200 million for the Congo Basin Forest Fund to finance development projects in Central Africa. He is a member of the United Nations' Reducing Emissions from Deforestation and Forest Degradation programme, a joint effort of the United Nations Development Programme, Food and Agriculture Organization, and the United Nations Environment Programme.

Since 2006, Bounda also served as regional advisor for Africa to the board of directors of the United Nations Federal Credit Union (UNFCU). He also assisted in the opening of the UNFCU Liaison Office in Nairobi.

Bounda served as the chief librarian of the Sérgio Vieira de Mello United Nations Information Services in Nairobi from 2002–2005.
