= Alexandre Sambat =

Gabonese politician and diplomat

Alexandre Sambat (4 October 1948 – 19 September 1998) was a Gabonese politician and diplomat. He was Gabon's Ambassador to the United States from 1991 to 1993 and then joined the opposition in Gabon, standing unsuccessfully as a candidate in the December 1993 presidential election. After that election, he served in the government until his death in 1998.

Born in Makokou, Sambat became a chemical engineer. He was Minister of National Education until being appointed as Minister of State for Tourism, Leisure, and National Parks on 18 November 1987. He was subsequently appointed as Ambassador to the United States on 26 April 1991 and presented his credentials on 11 June 1991.

A composition by Sambat, the "World Peace Song", premiered in January 1992; Sambat sang and played keyboard during the performance, which was characterized by a "bright, melodic refrain". Its lyrics were in both English and French.

After the 1993 election, he was again included in the government; as of 1995 he was Minister of Human Rights. He was the only member of the opposition included in the government that was named on 28 January 1997; on that occasion he was appointed as Minister of Youth, Sports, and Leisure.

Sambat remained Minister of Youth and Sports until he died of an aneurysm at a Paris hospital in September 1998. He was succeeded as Minister of Youth and Sports by Pierre Emboni.
