= Jean Rémy Ayouné =

Gabonese politician

Jean Rémy Ayouné (June 5, 1914 – December 1992) was the foreign minister of Gabon from 1968 to 1971, and then Minister of Justice.

Preceded by Paul Malékou	Foreign Minister of Gabon; 1968–1971	Succeeded by Georges Rawiri
