= Noel Nelson Messone =

Gabonese politician (born 1960)

Noël Nelson Messone (born 22 December 1960 in Ovan) is the Gabonese ambassador to the United States of America.

== Education ==
In 1987, Messone specialized in American studies at the Omar Bongo Odimba University in Gabon, after which he studied at the University of Paris-Sorbonne-Nouvell where he received his bachelor in 1988. He received his master's degree in diplomacy and international trade from the Patterson School of Diplomacy and International Commerce in Lexington, Kentucky in 1991 and his Ph.D in political economy from the University of Kentucky in 1994.

== Diplomatic career ==
Messone worked as associate director of the United States Peace Corps from 1995 to 1999. From 1999 to 2007, he held various positions for the International Organization of La Francophonie (OIF). From 2007 to 2009, Messone was the minister of foreign affairs to the Gabonese Republic, after which he was elected senator of the parliament.

In 2010 he was the Gabonese ambassador to the Benelux states and the European Union before being appointed permanent representative of Gabon to the United Nations in 2011.

In 2013, he was appointed as Minister of Forest, Environment and Protection of Natural Resources. In 2016, Noël Nelson Messone became minister of foreign affairs to the Gabonese Republic, replacing Pacôme Moubelet-Boubeya.

On 10 August 2022, Messone was appointed as ambassador of the Gabonese Republic to the United States of America.
