= Chaillot Papers =

Official publication series by the European Union Institute for Security Studies

Chaillot Papers are monographic publications of various topics issued by the European Union Institute for Security Studies (EUISS). They are written by the EUISS researchers or by external authors commissioned by the EUISS. The Papers can be found at the EUISS website, downloadable in PDF format.

The Chaillot Papers have been issued since 1991, initially by the Institute for Security Studies of the Western European Union.

== See also ==
- Adelphi Papers
- European Union Institute for Security Studies
- European External Action Service
- Common Foreign and Security Policy
