= André Gustave Anguilé =

Gabonese politician and diplomat

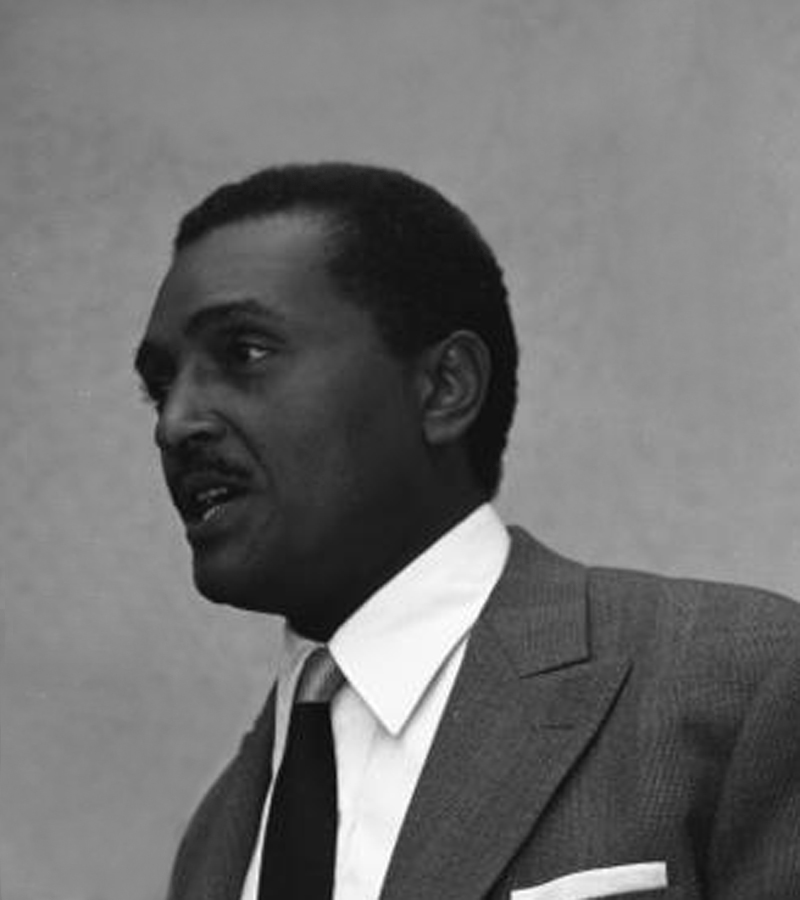
Anguilé in 1963

André Gustave Anguilé (3 March 1920 in Libreville – 23 May 1999 in Paris) was a former Gabonese politician and diplomat. He was the foreign minister of his country from 1960 to 1961, and the minister of public finance from 1960 to 1965.

== Biography ==
He was born in Libreville, Gabon. He was educated in France, served in the French armed forces during World War II, and worked in the forestry service of the French Ministry of Industrial Production after the war.

Anguilé returned to Gabon in 1946 and entered politics, becoming the Secretary General of the Territorial Assembly in 1952. Due to his forestry training, he was named Forestry Minister as part of the first Gabonese government in 1957. In 1958, he became the Minister of Finance, Economy, and National Planning. He was also part of Gabon's first delegation to the United Nations in 1960.

Preceded by Position created	Foreign Minister of Gabon; 1960-1961	Succeeded by Jean-Hilaire Aubame
