= Wepa Hajyýew =

Turkmenistan politician

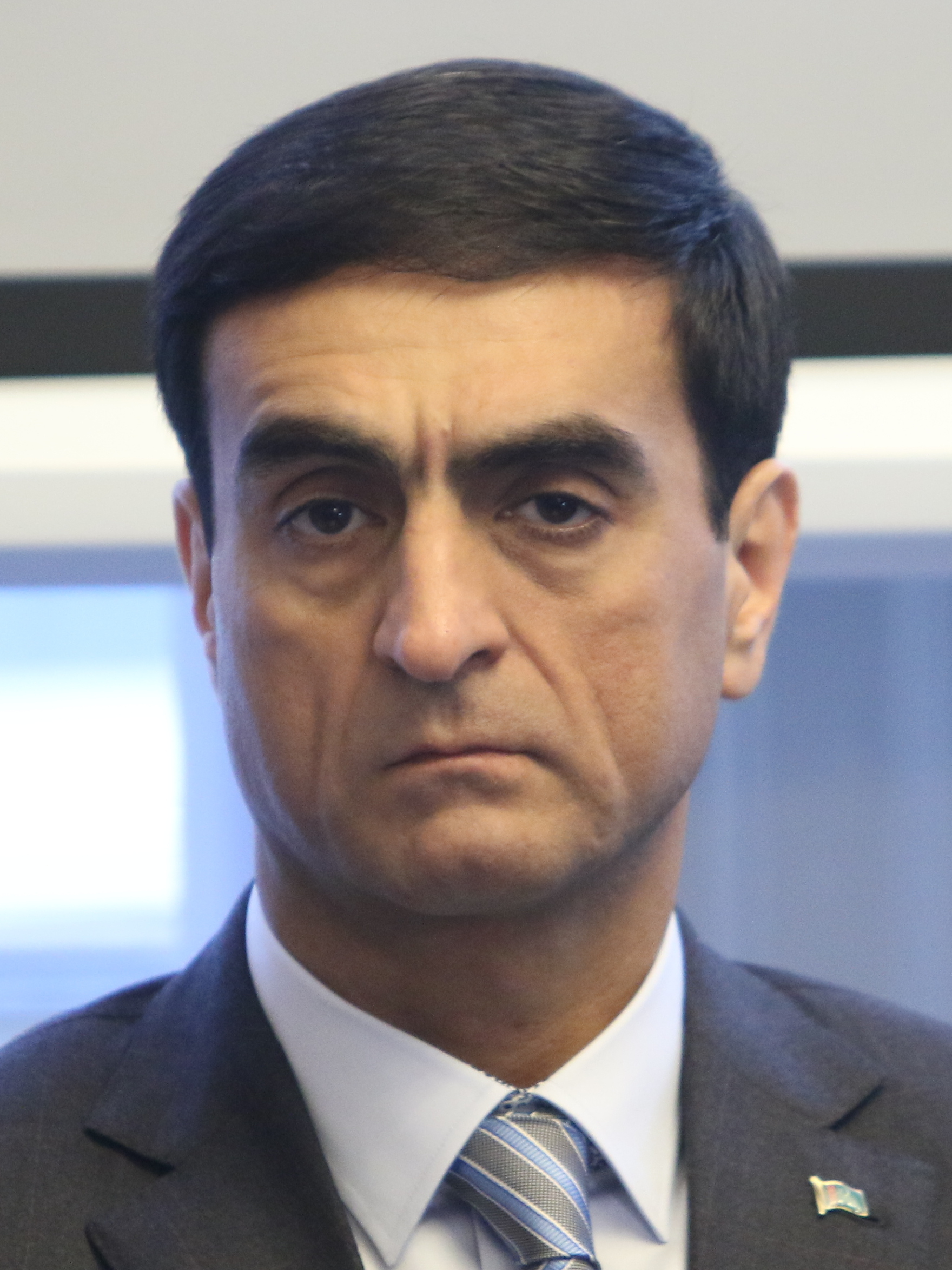
- Hajyýew in 2018

Deputy Minister of Foreign Affairs
- In office 2006 – December 11, 2023

Permanent Representative to UN Agencies in Geneva, Ambassador to Switzerland
- Incumbent
- Assumed office December 14, 2023
- Preceded by: Atageldi Haljanow

Personal details
- Born: Wepa Seksengeldiýewyç Hajyýew; 1972 (age 53–54) Ashgabat, Turkmen SSR, Soviet Union (now Turkmenistan)

Wepa Seksengeldiýewyç Hajyýew (Russian: Вепа Сексенгельдыевич Хаджиев) is a Turkmenistan politician who is currently serving as Turkmenistan's permanent representative to the United Nations agencies in Geneva and ambassador to Switzerland. From 2006 to 2023 he was Deputy Minister of Foreign Affairs.

== Career ==
In his previous position, Hajyýew was the Ministry of Foreign Affairs' point person for dealing with Afghanistan and Iran, in part due to his fluency in Persian. He also held the human rights portfolio for dealing with international human rights agencies.

Hajyýew is a graduate of Turkmen State University; he joined the Ministry of Foreign Affairs in 2002. He was appointed a counselor of the Middle East Department in 2005, acting head of that department in 2006, and deputy minister of foreign affairs in 2006. On 11 December 2023 he was appointed permanent representative to the United Nations agencies in Geneva and concurrently ambassador to Switzerland.

According to opposition media, Hajiyev is also a general officer in the Ministry of National Security.

== Personal life ==
Hajyýew's daughter and eldest son, Aýlar Nuryýewa and Myrat Hajyýew, are members of the Turkmenistan parliament. In addition, according to opposition media reports, Hajyýew's son is an adviser to the President of Turkmenistan on foreign trade and international legal issues and at the same time an officer in the special reserve of the Ministry of National Security of Turkmenistan was caught in connections with the criminal world and deals in oil products using his official position.
