= Adelphi Papers =

The Adelphi Papers is a monograph series in which the policy-related original academic research of the International Institute for Strategic Studies is principally published. The series was established in 1961 and continues today.

The publications are required to be about 28,000 to 30,000 words—longer than typical journal articles, but shorter than books. About eight Adelphi papers are published annually. 385 issues have been published from 1961 to 2006.

== See also ==
- Chaillot Papers
