= Marie-Édith Tassyla-Ye-Doumbeneny =

Gabonese politician

Minister of Foreign Affairs
- Incumbent
- Assumed office 1 January 2026
- President: Brice Oligui Nguema
- Preceded by: Régis Onanga Ndiaye

Personal details
- Born: 1972 (age 53–54)

Marie-Édith Tassyla-Ye-Doumbeneny (born 1972) is a Gabonese politician who has served as Minister for Foreign Affairs since 2026.

== Biography ==
Tassyla-Ye-Doumbeneny is originally from Franceville in Haut-Ogooué Province. As a diplomat she served as ambassador to France.
