= Félicité Ongouori Ngoubili =

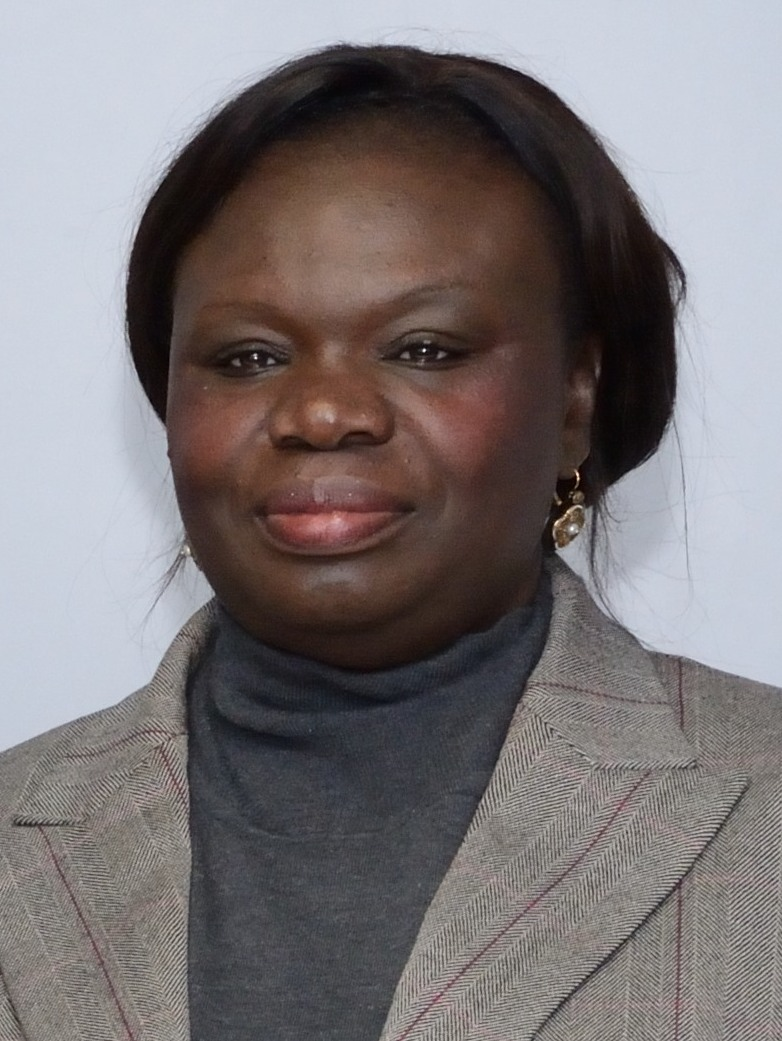
- Félicité Ongouori Ngoubili in 2014

Minister of National Defence
- In office 8 March 2022 – 30 August 2023
- President: Ali Bongo
- Preceded by: Michael Moussa Adamo
- Succeeded by: Brice Oligui Nguema

Personal details
- Born: Félicité Ongouori Ngoubili; 1 September 1959 (age 67) Obia, Lekoni-Lekori, Gabon
- Party: Gabonese Democratic Party
- Education: Omar Bongo University

Félicité Ongouori Ngoubili (born 1 September 1959) is a Gabonese politician and diplomat. She served as Gabon's Minister of National Defence under President Ali Bongo until he was overthrown by Brice Oligui Nguema in the coup d'état of 30 August 2023. She is the third woman to hold this position.

== Biography ==
=== Academic background ===
Félicité Ongouori Ngoubili was born in the village of Obia in the Haut-Ogooué province of Gabon. After obtaining her baccalaureate, she studied history at Omar Bongo University between 1979 and 1984. There she obtained a bachelor's degree and then a master's degree in history. Ongouori Ngoubili then went to France in 1985, where she obtained a Diploma of Advanced Studies (DEA) in the History of International Relations from the Pierre Renouvin Institute in Paris.

=== Political career ===
Upon returning to Gabon, Ongouori Ngoubili became a Foreign Affairs Advisor in 1986. The following year, in 1987, she became Ambassador-at-Large for the Europe Zone. Between 1990 and 2002, she served as Deputy Secretary-General and Ambassador Extraordinary and Plenipotentiary of Gabon to Ghana, Benin and Niger.

From 2002 to 2008, she was Deputy Chief of Staff to the President of the Republic in charge of Administrative Affairs (2002-2008) under the presidency of Omar Bongo.

In June 2008, she was promoted to High Representative of Gabon to France. She has also served as Gabon's Ambassador to Monaco, Switzerland and Portugal.

== Distinctions ==
- Ordre de l'Étoile équatoriale
- Officier de l’ordre national du Mérite
- Médaille de la Gendarmerie nationale
- Officier de l’ordre national du Mérite français
