= Radio Libreville =

Radio Libreville is a radio station based in Libreville, Gabon's capital. The station played an important role politically in Gabon throughout the 1960s and 1970s and was the state's communication system to the nation.

== See also ==
- Media of Gabon
