= Andrew Aaron Chisha =

Zambian Roman Catholic bishop (born 1933)

The Most Reverend Andrew Aaron Chisha
- Bishop emeritus of Mansa
- Church: Catholic Church
- Archdiocese: Kasama
- Diocese: Mansa
- Appointed: 1 July 1993
- Installed: 12 December 1993
- Retired: 15 January 2009
- Predecessor: James Mwewa Spaita
- Successor: Patrick Chilekwa Chisanga

Orders
- Ordination: 29 August 1965
- Consecration: 12 December 1993 by Giuseppe Leanza

Personal details
- Born: 24 November 1933 (age 92) Kaputa, Northern Province, Northern Rhodesia

Andrew Aaron Chisha (born 24 November 1933) is a Zambian Roman Catholic prelate who served as the Bishop of Mansa from 1993 until his retirement in 2009.

== Early life and priesthood ==
Chisha was born in Kaputa, Zambia, on 24 November 1933, at the present-day an ecclesiastical territory of the Archdiocese of Kasama.

He was ordained a priest for then Diocese of Kasama on 29 August 1965. During his priestly ministry he served in several parishes of Kasama.

== Episcopate ==
On 1 July 1993, Pope John Paul II appointed Chisha Bishop of Mansa. The appointment was recorded in the Acta Apostolicae Sedis, which lists him as the vicar general of the Archdiocese of Kasama on that date.

Chisha was consecrated a bishop on 12 December 1993. Giuseppe Leanza, then titular Archbishop of Lilybaeum and Apostolic Nuncio to Zambia, served as principal consecrator, while James Mwewa Spaita, Archbishop of Kasama, and Adrian Mung'andu, Archbishop of Lusaka, were principal co-consecrators.

He succeeded James Mwewa Spaita as Bishop of Mansa. Chisha remained in office for more than 15 years.

== Retirement ==
On 15 January 2009, Pope Benedict XVI accepted Chisha's resignation from the pastoral government of the Diocese of Mansa in accordance with canon 401 §1 of the Code of Canon Law.

After his retirement he continued to be involved in the life of the Catholic Church in Zambia. In 2018, as Bishop Emeritus of Mansa, he was the principal celebrant at a Mass marking the 25th anniversary of religious profession of three sisters, where he preached on Christian vocation and service.

In 2021, during celebrations marking the diamond jubilee of the Diocese of Mansa, Bishop Patrick Chilekwa Chisanga presented Chisha with an Exemplary Service Award for his contribution to the growth of the diocese.

In 2025, Chisha marked 60 years of priestly ministry. A Mass celebrating his diamond jubilee as a priest was held at St. John the Apostle Cathedral, Kasama, on 11 October 2025. The Mass was presided over by Ignatius Chama, Archbishop of Kasama, and was attended by, among others, Patrick Chisanga, Bishop of Mansa, and George Cosmas Zumaire Lungu, Bishop of Chipata.

At the time of the celebration, Chisha was residing in retirement at Mary Queen of Peace Parish in Mporokoso.

== See also ==
Diocese of Mansa
