= Catholic Church in Gabon =

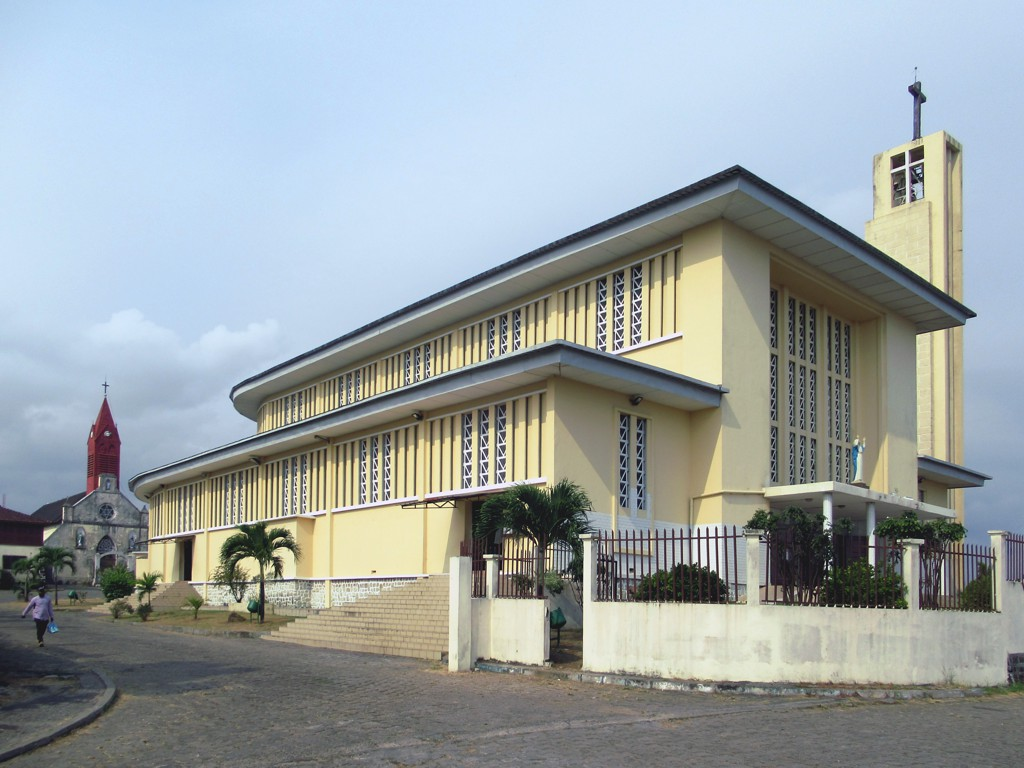
Cathedral of Saint-Marie in Libreville

The Catholic Church in Gabon is part of the worldwide Catholic Church, under the spiritual leadership of the Pope in Rome. It is endowed with the right to elect its own clergy, except archbishops.

In 2020, there were over 960,000 Catholics in Gabon; almost half the population divided in five major congregations. There are five dioceses including one archdiocese, plus an apostolic vicariate.

== History ==
The Catholic Church had its big first French missionary in Gabon Jean-Rémi Bessieux, from the Congregation of the Holy Spirit in the first half of the 19th century. In 1863 was born the apostolic vicariate of Gabon, then called from the Two Guineas. Only after the 1878 began the evangelization of the hinterland. In 1958 Gabon becomes an Ecclesiastical province, with an autonomous Metropolitan see in Libreville, in 1899 the first priest was ordained in Gabon, and in 1961 was ordered the first bishop. In 1982 the Catholic Church received a pastoral visit of Pope John Paul II.

On December 12, 1997 Holy See and the Republic of Gabon signed an agreeing on the principles and some legal provisions concerning their relationship and their collaboration.

In 2026, Pope Leo XIV appointed Archbishop Relwendé Kisito Ouédraogo, titular-elect of Ilta, as apostolic nuncio in Gabon.

== Ecclesiastical organization ==
The Catholic Church is present in Gabon with one ecclesiastical province, four suffragan dioceses and one apostolic prefecture:

- Archdiocese of Libreville
- Diocese of Franceville
- Diocese of Mouila
- Diocese of Oyem
- Diocese of Port-Gentil
- Apostolic Vicariate of Makokou

== Statistics ==
At the end of 2020 the Catholic Church in Gabon counted:

- 98 parishes;
- 229 priests;
- 198 religious sisters;
- 6 hospitals and care homes.

== See also ==
- Apostolic Nunciature to Gabon
- Religion in Gabon
- Evangelical Church of Gabon
