= List of Catholic dioceses in Gabon =

The Roman Catholic Church in Gabon is composed of one ecclesiastical province with 4 suffragan dioceses.

== List of dioceses ==
=== Episcopal Conference of Gabon ===
==== Ecclesiastical Province of Libreville ====
- Archdiocese of Libreville (1842; diocese 1955; archdiocese 1958)
  - Diocese of Franceville (1974)
  - Diocese of Mouila (1958)
  - Diocese of Oyem (1969)
  - Diocese of Port-Gentil (2003)

==== Immediately subject to the Holy See ====
- Apostolic Vicariate of Makokou
