= List of dioceses =

List of dioceses may refer to:

- List of Church of England dioceses
- List of dioceses of the Philippine Independent Church
- List of Roman Catholic Dioceses in South America
- List of Catholic dioceses
- List of dioceses of the Anglican Church of Canada
- Ecclesiastical provinces and dioceses of the Episcopal Church
- List of Anglican dioceses in Great Britain and Ireland
- List of dioceses, deaneries and parishes of the Church of Sweden

== Catholic dioceses by country and region ==
- List of Catholic dioceses in the United States
- List of Catholic dioceses in Uruguay
- List of Catholic dioceses in Ukraine
- List of Catholic dioceses in Uganda
- List of Catholic dioceses in the Philippines
- List of Catholic dioceses in Rwanda
- List of Catholic dioceses in Romania
- List of Catholic dioceses in Russia
- List of Catholic dioceses in Australia
- List of Catholic dioceses in Canada
- List of Catholic dioceses in Colombia
- List of Catholic dioceses in Costa Rica
- List of Catholic dioceses in the Czech Republic
- List of Catholic dioceses in China
- List of Catholic dioceses in Central Asia
- List of Catholic dioceses in Cuba
- List of Catholic dioceses in Chile
- List of Catholic dioceses in the Central African Republic
- List of Catholic dioceses in Chad
- List of Catholic dioceses in Iran
- List of Catholic dioceses in India
- List of Catholic dioceses in Italy
- List of Catholic dioceses in Ivory Coast
- List of Catholic dioceses in Iraq
- List of Catholic dioceses in Kenya
- List of Catholic dioceses in Scotland
- List of Catholic dioceses in Europe
- List of Catholic dioceses in El Salvador
- List of Catholic dioceses in Equatorial Guinea
- List of Catholic dioceses in Estonia
- List of Catholic dioceses in Ireland
- List of Catholic dioceses in Germany
- List of Catholic dioceses in Mexico
- List of Catholic dioceses in Cameroon
- List of Catholic dioceses in Bangladesh
- List of Catholic dioceses in Timor-Leste
- List of Catholic dioceses in South Africa, Botswana, and Swaziland
- List of Catholic dioceses in Spain
- List of Catholic dioceses in Switzerland
- List of Catholic dioceses in Senegal
- List of Catholic dioceses in Sri Lanka and the Maldives
- List of Catholic dioceses in France
- List of Catholic dioceses in Indonesia
- List of Catholic dioceses in Croatia
- List of Catholic dioceses in Angola
- List of Catholic dioceses in Albania
- List of Catholic dioceses of Asia
- List of Catholic dioceses in Angola and São Tomé and Príncipe
- List of Catholic dioceses in Algeria
- List of Catholic dioceses in Argentina
- List of Catholic dioceses in Africa
- List of Catholic dioceses in Austria
- List of Catholic dioceses in South Pacific Conference states
- List of Catholic dioceses in Sudan and South Sudan
- List of Catholic dioceses in Somalia and Djibouti
- List of Catholic dioceses in Slovakia
- List of Catholic dioceses in Serbia
- List of Catholic dioceses in Benin
- List of Catholic dioceses in Brazil
- List of Catholic dioceses in Bulgaria
- List of Catholic dioceses in Belgium
- List of Catholic dioceses in Belarus
- List of Catholic dioceses in Burundi
- List of Catholic dioceses in Burkina Faso and Niger
- List of Catholic dioceses in Bolivia
- List of Catholic dioceses in Bosnia and Herzegovina
- List of Catholic dioceses in Malaysia, Singapore, and Brunei
- List of Catholic dioceses in Panama
- List of Catholic dioceses in Mozambique
- List of Catholic dioceses in Madagascar
- List of Catholic dioceses in Malawi
- List of Catholic dioceses in Montenegro
- List of Catholic dioceses in Morocco, Mauritania and Western Sahara
- List of Catholic dioceses in Papua New Guinea and Solomon Islands
- List of Catholic dioceses in Pakistan and Afghanistan
- List of Catholic dioceses in Portugal
- List of Catholic dioceses in Paraguay
- List of Catholic dioceses in Poland
- List of Catholic dioceses in Mali
- List of Catholic dioceses in Myanmar
- List of Catholic dioceses in Zambia
- List of Catholic dioceses in Japan
- List of Catholic dioceses in Guatemala
- List of Catholic dioceses in Gabon
- List of Catholic dioceses in Guinea
- List of Catholic dioceses in Great Britain
- List of Catholic dioceses in Greece
- List of Catholic dioceses in Ghana
- List of Catholic dioceses in the Gambia and Sierra Leone
- List of Catholic dioceses in Guinea-Bissau
- List of Catholic dioceses in the Dominican Republic
- List of Catholic dioceses in Korea
- List of Catholic dioceses in Ethiopia and Eritrea
- List of Catholic dioceses in Egypt
- List of Catholic dioceses in Peru
- List of Catholic dioceses in Transcaucasia
- List of Catholic dioceses in Togo
- List of Catholic dioceses in Thailand
- List of Catholic dioceses in Liberia
- List of Catholic dioceses in Libya
- List of Catholic dioceses in Vietnam
- List of Catholic dioceses in Venezuela
- List of Catholic dioceses in Nicaragua
- List of Catholic dioceses in North Macedonia
- List of Catholic dioceses in Northern Arabia
- List of Catholic dioceses in Nigeria
- List of Catholic dioceses in Namibia
- List of Catholic dioceses in Norway
- List of Catholic dioceses in the Kingdom of the Netherlands
- List of Catholic dioceses in Nordic Europe
- List of Catholic dioceses in Laos and Cambodia
- List of Catholic dioceses in Lesotho
- List of Catholic dioceses in Lithuania
- List of Catholic dioceses in Lebanon
- List of Catholic dioceses in Latvia
- List of Catholic dioceses in Denmark
- List of Catholic dioceses in Hungary
- List of Catholic dioceses in Honduras
- List of Catholic dioceses in Haiti
- List of Catholic dioceses in Oceania
- List of Catholic dioceses in Zimbabwe
- List of Catholic dioceses in Finland
- List of Catholic dioceses in the Democratic Republic of the Congo
