= Raymond Mpezele =

Zambian Roman Catholic prelate

- Bishop
- Church: Catholic Church
- Archdiocese: Roman Catholic Archdiocese of Lusaka
- See: Roman Catholic Diocese of Livingstone
- Appointed: 3 May 1985
- Predecessor: Adrian Mung'andu
- Successor: Valentine Kalumba

Orders
- Ordination: 7 September 1969
- Consecration: 7 July 1985 by James Corboy
- Rank: Bishop

Personal details
- Born: Raymond Mpezele; May 7, 1939 (age 86) Bulanda Village, Zambia

Styles of Raymond Mpezele
- Reference style: His Grace; The Most Reverend
- Spoken style: Your Grace
- Religious style: Bishop

Raymond Mpezele (born 7 May 1939) is a Zambian Catholic prelate who is the Bishop Emeritus of the Diocese of Livingstone. He was appointed Bishop of Livingstone on 3 May 1985 by Pope John Paul II. He was consecrated bishop on 7 July 1985. He retired as bishop on 18 June 2016.

== Background and education ==
He was born on 7 May 1939 in Bulanda Village, in the Southern Province of Zambia. He studied for the priesthood at Kachebere Seminary in Malawi. Following this he studied at the University of Zambia in Lusaka, graduating with an academic degree.

== Priesthood ==
He was ordained a priest on 7 September 1969. He worked as a priest until 3 May 1985.

While he was priest he held the following offices, among other responsibilities:

- Lecturer and Spiritual Director at St. Dominic's Major Seminary in Lusaka, from 1981 until 1984.
- Parish priest in the Maamba area, Sinazongwe District in the Southern Province, Zambia from 1984 until 1985. This area is within the Diocese of Monze.

== As bishop ==
On 3 May 1985 Pope John Paul II appointed Father Raymond Mpezele as Bishop of the Diocese of Livingstone in Zambia. He was consecrated bishop and installed on 7 July 1985 outside Christ the King Cathedral in Livingstone, Zambia. The Principal Consecrator was Bishop James Corboy, SJ, Bishop of Monze, assisted by Archbishop Adrian Mung'andu, Archbishop of Lusaka and Archbishop Elias White Mutale, Archbishop of Kasama.

Having reached the retirement age, Bishop Raymond Mpezele requested Pope Francis for permission to resign. The Holy Father accepted the resignation and the resignation date was set for 18 June 2016. On that day he resigned and Bishop Valentine Kalumba was installed to replace him. Bishop Mpezele was the Principal Consecrator of Bishop Kalumba. Bishop Mpezele stayed on at the Diocese of Livingstone, as Bishop Emeritus.

== See also ==
- Edwin Mwansa Mulandu
- Catholicism in Zambia

== Succession table ==
Catholic Church titles
Preceded by Adrian Mung'andu (1974 - 1984)	Bishop of Diocese of Livingstone; 1985 - 2016	Succeeded by Valentine Kalumba (Since 16 June 2016)
