= Basile Mvé Engone =

Basile Mvé Engone SDB
- Archbishop Emeritus of Libreville
- Church: Catholic Church
- Archdiocese: Archdiocese of Libreville
- In office: 3 April 1998 – 12 March 2020
- Predecessor: André Fernand Anguilé
- Successor: Jean-Patrick Iba-Ba
- Previous posts: Apostolic Administrator of Franceville (2016-2018); Bishop of Oyem (1982-1998); Apostolic Administrator of Mouila (1992-1995); Coadjutor Bishop of Oyem (1980-1982)

Orders
- Ordination: 29 June 1973
- Consecration: 24 August 1980 by François Ndong

Personal details
- Born: 30 May 1941 (age 84)

Styles of Basile Mvé Engone
- Reference style: The Most Reverend
- Spoken style: Your Excellency
- Religious style: Monsignor

Basile Mvé Engone (born 30 May 1941) is a Gabonese prelate of the Catholic Church. He was Archbishop of Libreville in Gabon from 1998 to 2020.

== Biography ==
Mvé Engone was born in Nkolmelène, Gabon, in the Diocese of Oyem. He was ordained a priest on 29 June 1973 as a member of the Salesians of Saint John Bosco.

== Episcopal career ==
Mvé Engone was appointed coadjutor bishop of Oyem on 24 August 1980. He received his episcopal consecration on 24 August from Bishop François Ndong, with Archbishop André Fernand Anguilé and Bishop Félicien-Patrice Makouaka as co-consecrators. Mvé Engone succeeded Ndong as bishop of Oyem on 23 August 1982. He was appointed Metropolitan Archbishop of Libreville on 3 April 1998.

On 27 June 2007, Mvé Engone, along with several other prelates, attended a briefing at the Apostolic Palace on Pope Benedict's impending motu proprio allowing wider celebration of the Tridentine Mass.

Preceded by André Fernand Anguilé	Archbishop of Libreville; April 3, 1998—present	Succeeded by (incumbent)
