= Patrick Chilekwa Chisanga =

Zambian Roman Catholic prelate

- Bishop
- Church: Catholic Church
- Archdiocese: Roman Catholic Archdiocese of Kasama
- See: Roman Catholic Diocese of Mansa
- Appointed: 30 November 2013
- Predecessor: Andrew Aaron Chisha
- Successor: Incumbent

Orders
- Ordination: 27 June 1999
- Consecration: 1 February 2014 by Ignatius Chama
- Rank: Bishop

Personal details
- Born: Patrick Chilekwa Chisanga; May 16, 1971 (age 55) Kamuchanga Village, Zambia
- Coat of arms

Styles of Patrick Chilekwa Chisanga
- Reference style: His Grace; The Most Reverend
- Spoken style: Your Grace
- Religious style: Bishop

Patrick Chilekwa Chisanga (born 16 May 1971) is a Zambian Catholic prelate who is the Bishop of the Diocese of Mansa, in Zambia. He was appointed Bishop of Mansa on 30 November 2013 by Pope Francis. He was consecrated bishop in February 2014.

== Background and education ==
He was born on 16 May 1971 in Kamuchanga, Mufulira District, in the Copperbelt Province of Zambia. He completed his secondary school at the minor seminary of Ndola Diocese in 1990. He then joined the Order of Friars Minor Conventual. Upon completion of training as a Franciscan student, he studied philosophy and Theology. He graduated with a Doctoral degree in clinical psychology from the Pontifical Gregorian University in Rome, Italy in 2006.

== Priesthood ==
He professed as Member of Order of Friars Minor Conventual, in 1992. He took the Perpetual Vows of that religious Order in 1998. On 27 June 1999, he was ordained a priest in Ndola.

While he was priest he held the following offices, among other responsibilities:

- Parish priest in various parishes in the Diocese of Ndola
- Director of Formation for the Franciscans, responsible for the Franciscans in Zambia
- Senior Lecturer of Psychology at St. Bonaventure College, Lusaka.

== As bishop ==
On 30 November 2013 Pope Francis appointed Father Patrick Chilekwa Chisanga, OFM Conv. as the Bishop of Mansa, Zambia. He was consecrated bishop and installed on 1 February 2014 at the Don Bosco Centre in Mansa, Zambia. The Principal Consecrator was Archbishop Ignatius Chama, Archbishop of Kasama, assisted by Bishop Gianfranco Girotti, OFM Conv. Titular Bishop of Meta and Bishop George Cosmas Zumaire Lungu, Bishop of Chipata.

== See also ==
- Edwin Mwansa Mulandu
- Catholicism in Zambia

== Succession table ==
Catholic Church titles
Preceded by Andrew Aaron Chisha (1993 - 2009)	Bishop of Diocese of Mansa; 2013 - present	Succeeded by Incumbent (Since 30 November 2013)
