= Jean-Jérôme Adam =

French Roman Catholic archbishop and linguist

Jean-Jérôme Adam C.S.Sp.
- Archbishop of Libreville
- Church: Catholic Church
- Archdiocese: Archdiocese of Libreville
- In office: 10 July 1947 – 29 May 1969
- Predecessor: Louis-Michel-François Tardy
- Successor: André Fernand Anguilé
- Other post: Titular Bishop of Brixellum (1969-1976)
- Previous post: Titular Bishop of Rhinocorura (1947-1955)

Orders
- Ordination: 28 October 1928
- Consecration: 9 December 1947 by Jean-Julien Weber

Personal details
- Born: 8 June 1904 Wittenheim, Alsace–Lorraine, German Empire
- Died: 11 July 1981 (aged 77) Franceville, Haut-Ogooué Province, Gabon

Jean-Jérôme Adam (8 June 1904 – 11 July 1981) was the French Roman Catholic archbishop of Libreville, Gabon, and an accomplished linguist who studied several of the languages of Gabon.

He was born at Wittenheim in Alsace and educated in the seminaries of the Holy Ghost Fathers. He arrived in Gabon on 29 September 1929, and spent the next 18 years as a missionary in the Haut-Ogooué Province. During that time he prepared grammars for the Mbédé, Ndumu, and Duma languages.

In 1947, Adam was appointed Vicar Apostolic of Libreville and bishop of the titular see of Rhinocorura; he became bishop of Libreville when it was elevated to a diocese in 1955, and he was made archbishop of the see in 1958. He retired in 1969 and moved to Franceville, where he died in 1981.
