= St. John the Apostle Cathedral, Kasama =

St. John the Apostle Cathedral
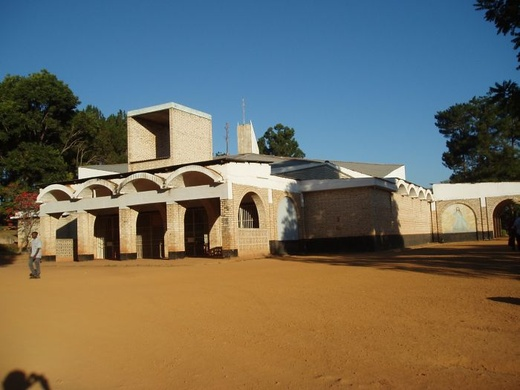
- St. John the Apostle Cathedral
- Location: Kasama
- Country: Zambia
- Denomination: Roman Catholic Church

Administration
- Archdiocese: Kasama

Clergy
- Archbishop: Ignatius Chama

The St. John the Apostle Cathedral or just Kasama Cathedral, is a religious building belonging to the Catholic Church and is located in the town of Kasama, in Northern Province, in the African country of Zambia.

The church follows the Roman or Latin rite. The church functions as the headquarters of the Metropolitan Archdiocese of Kasama (Archidioecesis Kasamaënsis), which was created in 1967 by the papal bull Qui altissimi Dei by Pope Paul VI.

== See also ==
- Roman Catholicism in Zambia
- St. John's Cathedral (disambiguation)
