= Étienne-Benoît Larue =

Mgr. Etienne-Benoît Larue
- Vicar Apostolic of Bangueolo
- Installed: 28 January 1913
- Term ended: 5 October 1935
- Successor: Alexandre-Auguste-Laurent-Marie Roy
- Other post: Titular Bishop of Thuburbo Minus (28 January 1913 - 5 October 1935)

Orders
- Ordination: 28 May 1891
- Consecration: 1 April 1913 by Bishop Henri-Raymond Villard

Personal details
- Born: 12 June 1865 Saint-Christophe-en-Brionnais, France
- Died: 5 October 1935 (aged 70)

Étienne-Benoît Larue (12 June 1865 - 5 October 1935) was a French Catholic White Fathers missionary who was the first Vicar Apostolic of Bangueolo (now Kasama) in what is now Zambia from 1913 until his death in 1935.

== Early years ==
Etienne-Benoît Larue was born on 12 June 1865 in Saint-Christophe-en-Brionnais, France. On 28 May 1891 he was ordained a priest of the White Fathers (Society of Missionaries of Africa). For a period he was a lecturer of moral theology at the White Fathers' Seminary in Carthage. He was regional superior of the Apostolic Vicariate of Nyasa before being appointed Vicar Apostolic of Bangueolo.

== Vicar Apostolic ==
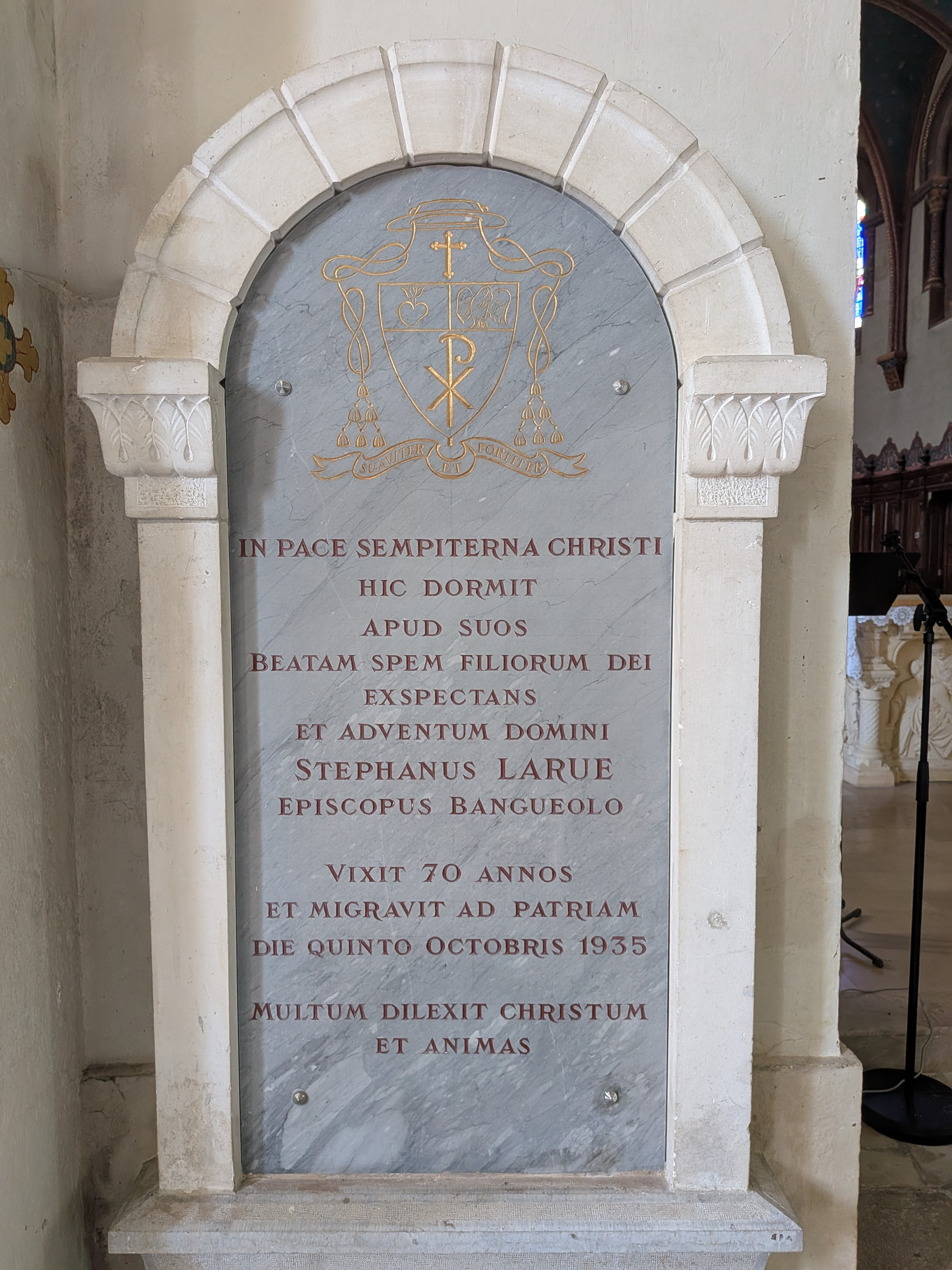
Étienne-Benoît Larue grave in Saint-Christophe-en-Brionnais' church.

On 28 January 1913 the Apostolic Vicariate of Bangueolo was separated from that of Nyassa. The new vicariate of Bangweulu covered the Northern and Luapula Regions, while the southeast part kept the name Nyassa. Bishop Mathurin Guillemé continued to administer the vicariate of Nyassa from Bembeke. Larue was appointed Titular Bishop of Thuburbo Minus and Vicar Apostolic of Bangueolo. He was based at Chilubula. Larue was ordained bishop on 1 April 1913 by Bishop Henri-Raymond Villard.

Larue did not at first see secular education as part of the mission's role, saying in 1924, "The chapels have nothing to do with the schools. This is the tyranny of the Protestants, driven no doubt by the English administration." However, the Vatican felt otherwise, and in 1926 issued an Encyclical on Catholic Education. The church leaders felt developing an educated Catholic elite was of great importance.

In 1928 Larue made a rule that each Christian adult had to pay a tithe of three pennies per year, in cash or kind, or they would not be allowed to receive sacraments at their village, although they could receive sacraments elsewhere. In 1930 Larue turned down a request to take responsibility for missionary work in the Lambaland mining region since he felt his missionaries were needed to support the fast-growing population of converts in his largely-rural vicariate.

Etienne died on 5 October 1935.

== Views ==
Larue tended to take a legalistic view of the relationships between the mission, the local people and the colonial authorities. His views are often given in terms of rights and duties. Thus he felt that non-believers had a duty to be taught the Catholic faith, and that once baptized they lost some rights, such as the right to a civil divorce. He was willing to collaborate with the administration. He felt that the civil power and the mission had different areas of authority, which were usually not in conflict. As a result of Laroue's insistence on obligations, some people came to think that the missionaries derived authority from the government, and even that they were paid by the government.
