= Islam in Gabon =

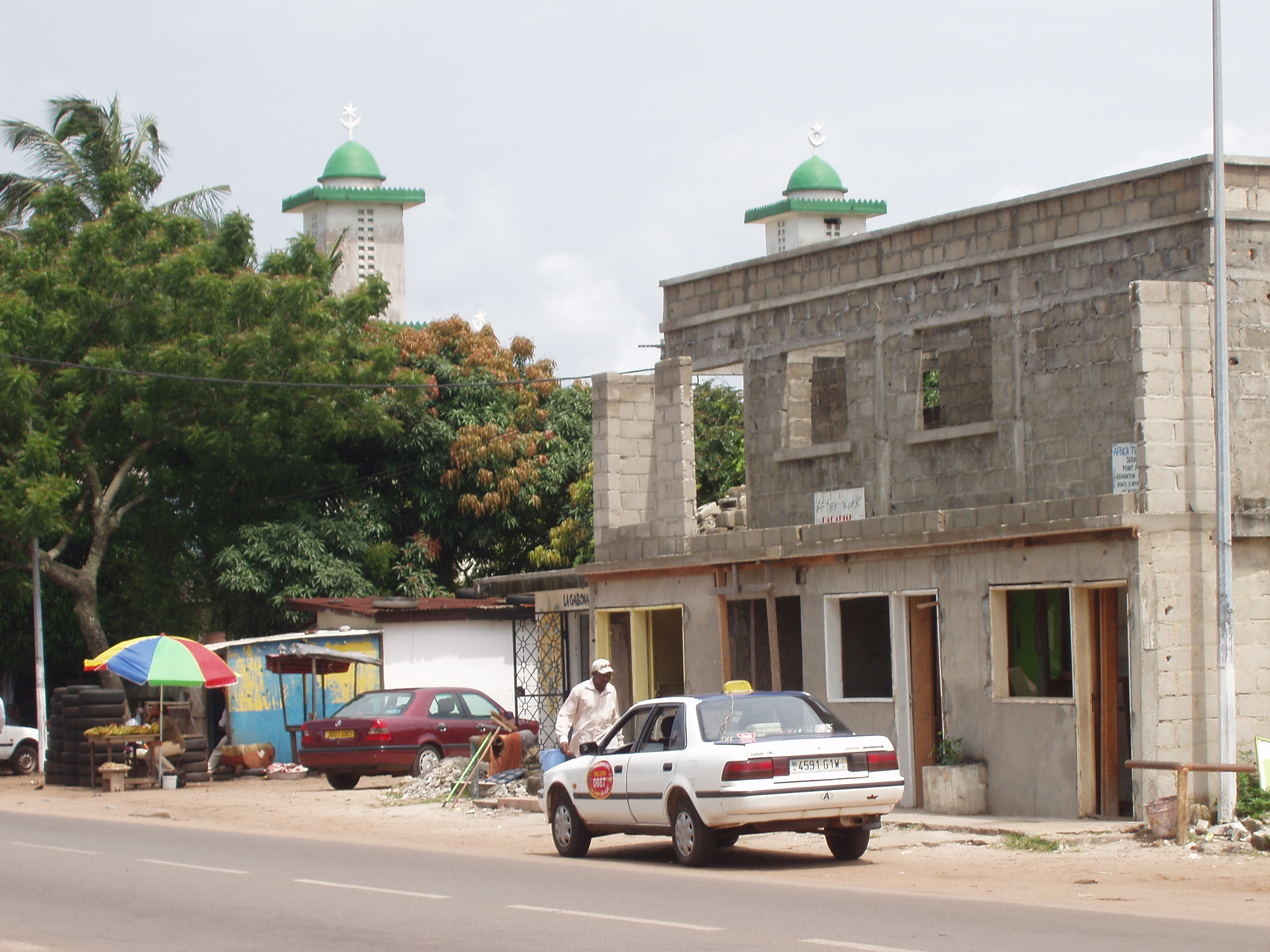
Mosque in Port-Gentil, Gabon

Gabon is a Christian majority nation, with around ten percent of the population being Muslim according to 2020 figures. Almost all of them follow Sunni Islam. Due to the secular nature of the country's constitution, Muslims are free to proselytize and build places of worship in the country.

== History ==
Islam first arrived in Gabon due to the presence of Hausa–Fulani merchants and Muslim Senegalese troops sent in by the French during the 19th and 20th centuries. Gabon was also the site where two prominent Muslims, Amadou Bamba and Samori Touré, were exiled to by the French colonial government. However, Islam did not actively spread until the 1970s and 1980s. The conversion of Gabonese president Omar Bongo to Islam helped to popularize the religion along with other notable Gabonese figures converting. Since then, Islam has become a significant religion in the nation.

Islam in Gabon is primarily practiced by those of immigrant origin, mainly from West Africa. A significant minority are native Gabonese. As of 2017, there are 24 mosques found throughout Gabon. The largest mosques are located in Libreville, Port-Gentil, Franceville, and Oyem.

== Overview ==
Islamic, Catholic and Protestant denominations operate primary and secondary schools in Gabon. These schools are required to register with the Ministry of Education, which is charged with ensuring that these religious schools meet the same standards required for public schools. The government does not contribute funds to private schools, whether religious or secular.

The Gabonese Government celebrates some Christian and Muslim holy days as national holidays. These include Easter Sunday and Monday, Ascension Day, Assumption Day, All Saints' Day, Christmas, Eid al-Kebir, and Eid al-Fitr.

The government television stations accorded free transmission time to the Catholic Church, some Protestant congregations, and Islamic mosques. Some Protestant denominations alleged that the government television station does not accord free airtime to minority religious groups. Protestants have alleged in the past that the armed forces favor Catholics and Muslims in hiring and promotion.

Gabon's presidency has been held by Muslims since 1973. Political strongman Omar Bongo converted to Islam in 1973 and changed his name from Albert-Bernard Bongo to its current form. Following Omar Bongo's death, his son Ali Bongo Ondimba, also a Muslim, ascended to the presidency. Gabon is a member of the Organisation of Islamic Cooperation, having joined under Omar Bongo's leadership in 1974.

In 2004 a first national conference for the Muslims of Gabon was held in the capital city of the country, Libreville, on the theme ‘United for the sake of a flourishing and tolerant Islam’. During the conference, heads of some 34 Islamic societies of Gabon signed an agreement for undertaking coordinated Islamic works on the sidelines of the event.

== Notable Muslims ==
- Ali Bongo Ondimba
- Edith Lucie Bongo
- Omar Bongo

== See also ==
- Religion in Gabon
