= List of Catholic dioceses in Zambia =

The Roman Catholic Church in Zambia is composed of three ecclesiastical provinces and 9 suffragan dioceses.

== List of dioceses ==
=== Zambia Conference of Catholic Bishops ===
==== Ecclesiastical Province of Kasama ====
- Archdiocese of Kasama
  - Diocese of Mansa
  - Diocese of Mpika

==== Ecclesiastical Province of Lusaka ====
- Archdiocese of Lusaka
  - Diocese of Chipata
  - Diocese of Livingstone
  - Diocese of Mongu
  - Diocese of Monze

==== Ecclesiastical Province of Ndola ====
- Archdiocese of Ndola
  - Diocese of Kabwe
  - Diocese of Solwezi
