= Ngol =

Congolese religious sect

Ngol, or Dance de Gaulle, was a syncretic messianic sect that emerged in northern Moyen-Congo around 1950. The cult organized itself copying the ecclesiastical hierarchy of the mission churches. The name ngol was derived from Charles de Gaulle and the Kikongo word 'ngolo' (meaning 'power').

In a few months it had spread across Moyen-Congo and to southern Gabon. The ngol movement gathered many Bakongo youth, in revolt against tribal elders. The leaders of the movement were jailed or exiled for engaging in violence, and the movement soon ebbed out. Moreover, the use of the name of de Gaulle caused confusion as he was identified with the French authorities.

== See also ==
- Religion in Gabon
- Religion in the Republic of the Congo
