= Diocese of Livingstone =

Roman Catholic diocese in Zambia

Coordinates: 17.8532°S 25.8557°E

Diocese of Livingstone Dioecesis Livingstonensis
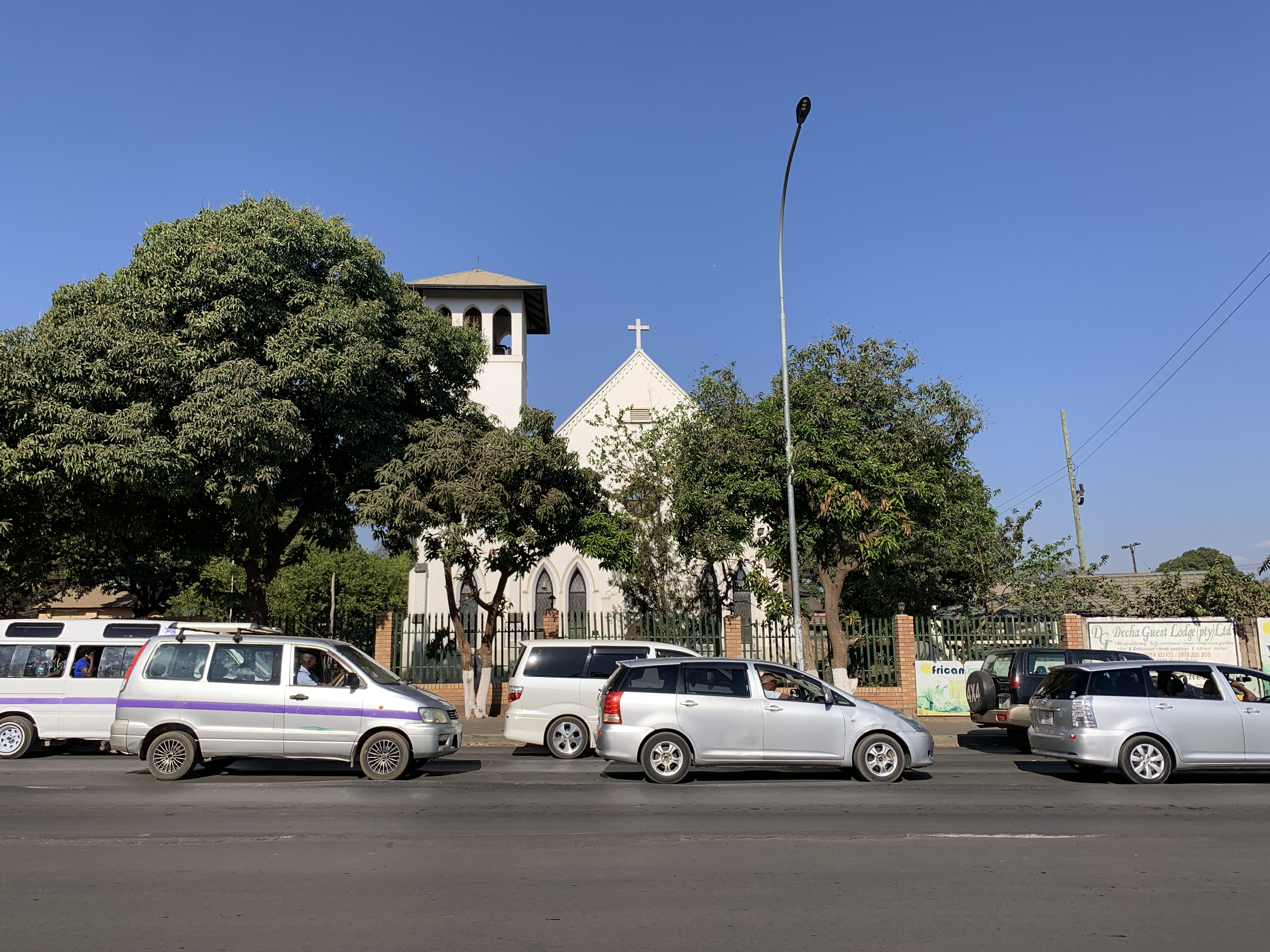
- St. Theresa's Catholic Church

Location
- Country: Zambia
- Metropolitan: Lusaka

Statistics
- Area: 58,200 km^{2} (22,500 sq mi)
- Population: Total; Catholics: (as of 2004); 419,060; 69,810 (16.7%)

Information
- Rite: Latin Rite

Current leadership
- Pope: Leo XIV
- Bishop: Valentine Kalumba, OMI
- Bishops emeritus: Raymond Mpezele

The Roman Catholic Diocese of Livingstone (Latin: Livingstonen[sis]) is a diocese located in Livingstone in Zambia.

== History ==
- May 25, 1936: Established as Apostolic Prefecture of Victoria Falls from the Apostolic Prefecture of Broken Hill
- March 10, 1950: Promoted as Apostolic Vicariate of Livingstone
- April 25, 1959: Promoted as Diocese of Livingstone

== Leadership ==
- Prefect Apostolic of Victoria Falls
  - Fr. Vincent Joseph Flynn, OFMCap (1936.07.28 – 1950.03.10)
- Vicar Apostolic of Livingstone
  - Bishop Timothy Phelim O'Shea, OFMCap (1950.05.24 – 1959.04.25 see below)
- Bishops of Livingstone
  - Bishop Timothy Phelim O'Shea, OFMCap (see above 1959.04.25 – 1974.11.18)
  - Bishop Adrian Mung'andu (1974.11.18 – 1984.01.09), appointed Archbishop of Lusaka
  - Bishop Raymond Mpezele (1985.05.03 - 2016.05.18)
  - Bishop Valentine Kalumba, OMI (since 2016.06.18)

== See also ==
- Roman Catholicism in Zambia

== Sources ==
- GCatholic.org
- Catholic Hierarchy
