= Casino de Port-Gentil =

Casino in Port-Gentil, Gabon

- Interactive map of Casino de Port-Gentil
- Location: Port-Gentil, Gabon; 0°43′8″S 8°46′58″E

Casino de Port-Gentil is a casino in Port-Gentil, Gabon. It is located near the École Mixte and Saint Louis Church. The casino forms part of an entertainment complex in the city which includes "Le Galion" next door, the Supermarche Casino across the street and the City Sport Centre. It opens at 10pm from Thursday to Sunday and features blackjack, roulette, poker and slot machines.
