= Diocese of Franceville =

Roman Catholic diocese in Gabon

Coordinates: 1.6318°S 13.6077°E

Diocese of Franceville Dioecesis Francopolitan(us) in Gabone

Location
- Country: Gabon
- Metropolitan: Libreville

Statistics
- Area: 61,927 km^{2} (23,910 sq mi)
- Population: Total; Catholics: (as of 2004); 287,045; 82,150 (28.6%)

Information
- Rite: Latin Rite

Current leadership
- Pope: Leo XIV
- Bishop elect: Ephrem Ndjoni

The Roman Catholic Diocese of Franceville (Latin: Francopolitan(us) in Gabone, French: Diocèse catholique romain de Franceville) is a diocese located in the city of Franceville in the ecclesiastical province of Libreville in Gabon.

== History ==
- 5 October 1974: Established as Diocese of Franceville from the Diocese of Mouila

== Bishops of Franceville ==
- Félicien-Patrice Makouaka (5 October 1974 – 8 November 1996)
- Timothée Modibo-Nzockena (8 November 1996 – 4 November 2017)
- Jean-Patrick Iba-Ba (4 November 2017 – 12 March 2020)
- Ephrem Ndjoni (25 July 2022 – present) bishop elect

== See also ==
- Roman Catholicism in Gabon
