= Diocese of Port-Gentil =

Roman Catholic diocese in Gabon

Diocese of Port-Gentil Portus Gentil(is)

Location
- Country: Gabon
- Metropolitan: Libreville

Statistics
- Area: 22,850 km^{2} (8,820 sq mi)
- Population: Total; Catholics: (as of 2013); 127,300; 71,705 (56.3%)

Information
- Rite: Latin Rite

Current leadership
- Pope: Leo XIV
- Bishop: Eusebius Chinekezi Ogbonna Managwu

The Roman Catholic Diocese of Port-Gentil (Latin: Portus Gentil(is), French: Diocèse catholique romain de Port-Gentil) is a diocese located in the city of Port-Gentil in the ecclesiastical province of Libreville in Gabon.

== History ==
- 19 March 2003: Established as the Diocese of Port-Gentil from the Metropolitan Archdiocese of Libreville

== Bishops of Port-Gentil ==
- Mathieu Madega Lebouankehan (19 March 2003 - 19 January 2013); transferred to Mouila, also apostolic administrator of Port-Gentil
- Eusebius Chinekezi Ogbonna Managwu (12 January 2016 – present)

== See also ==
- Roman Catholicism in Gabon
