= Port-Gentil =

Port-Gentil Mandji
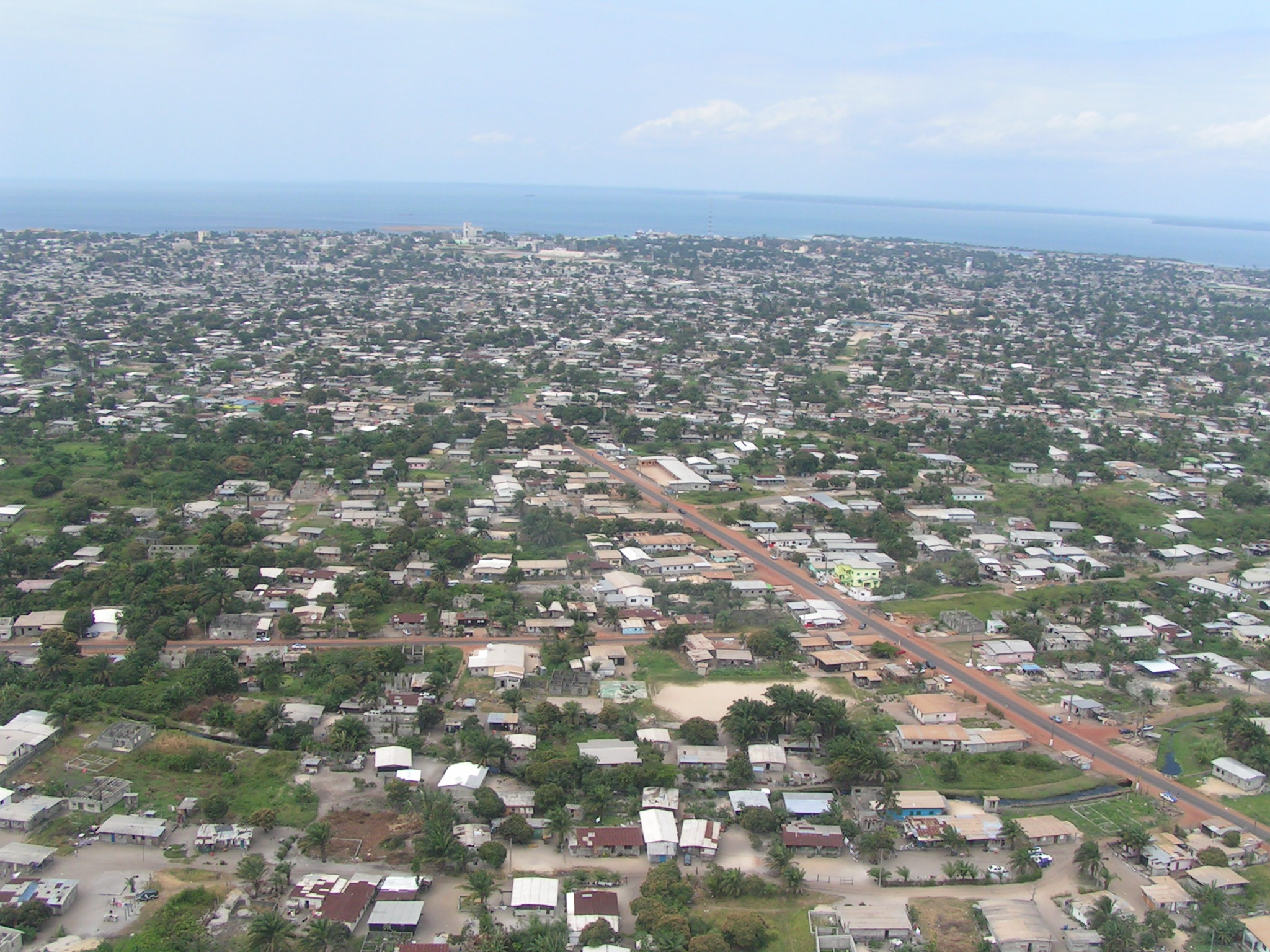

- Coat of arms

- Location in Gabon
- Coordinates: 0°43′S 8°47′E
- Country: Gabon
- Province: Ogooue-Maritime
- Department: Bendje Department

Population (2013 census)
  - Total: 136,462

Port-Gentil (French pronunciation: [pɔʁ ʒɑ̃ti]) or Mandji is the second-largest city of Gabon, and a leading seaport. It is the center of Gabon's petroleum and timber industries. The city is located on a delta island in the Ogooue delta. Nearby Cape Lopez is Gabon's westernmost point. As of 2013 census, it had a population of 136,462.

== History ==
In 1473, the Portuguese navigator Lopo Gonçalves sailed near Cape Lopez. In 1722, pirates led by Bartholomew Roberts fought a battle in the Cape Lopez Bay against the Royal Navy. The encounter ended in Roberts' death. The settlement was established on Mandji Island in the delta of the Ogooué River by the French, who signed a treaty with the Orungu people in 1873. It was used as a base for Pierre Savorgnan de Brazza's expeditions into the interior, then in 1894 a customs post was set up, becoming the nucleus of a trading center that included Hatton & Cookson, John Holt, Woermann, Société du Haut-Ogooué, and Compagnie d'Exploitations Forestières Africaines. The main products were initially rubber and ivory, gradually supplemented by wood, particularly okoumé for plywood.

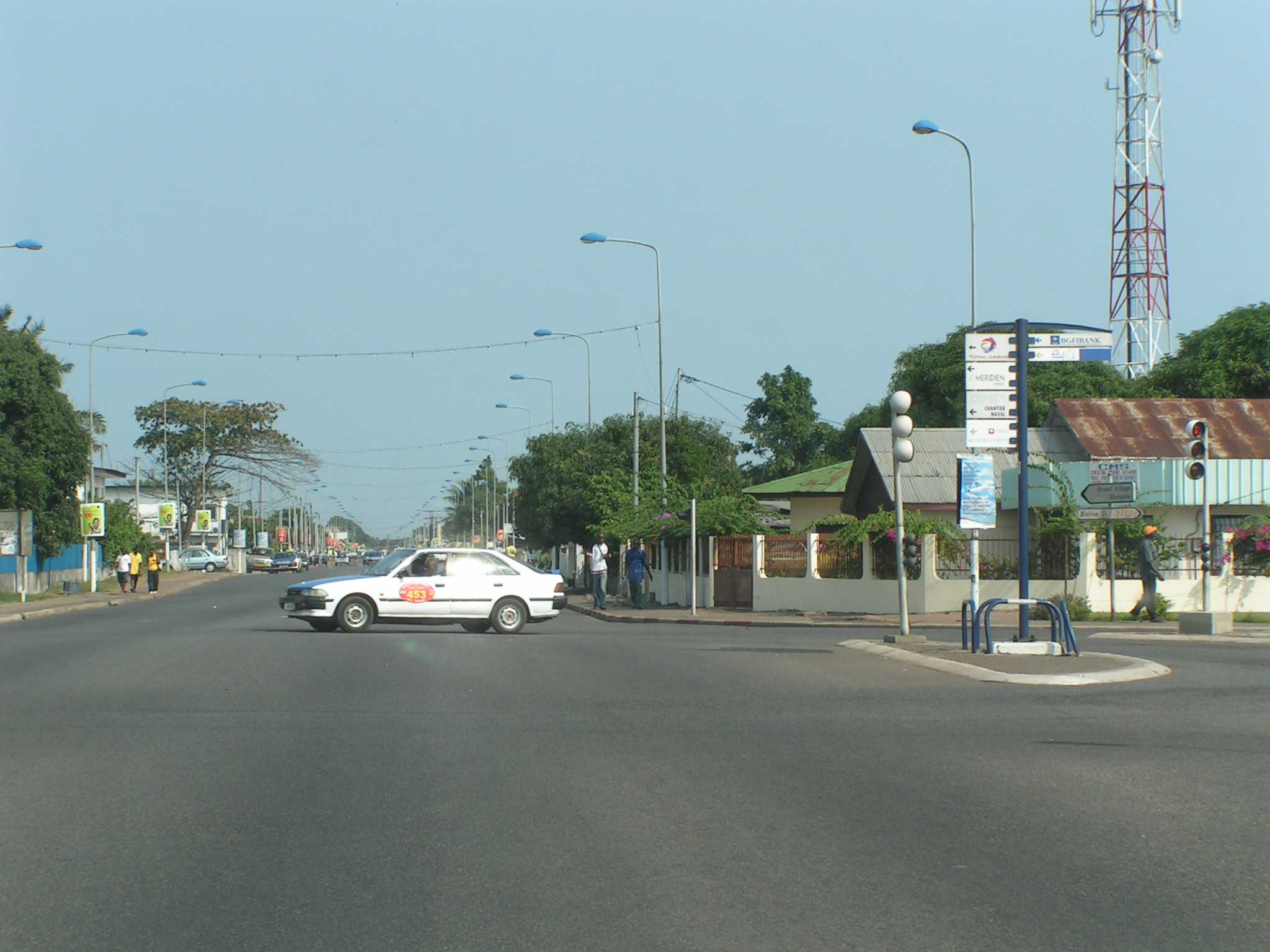
A street in Port-Gentil

The town was named after the French colonial administrator Émile Gentil in 1900. After World War I it became a port for timber, but it grew rapidly only after Elf began oil exploration in the area. It received its first bank branch when Bank of West Africa (BAO) opened a branch there in 1928.

The city was the location of the exile of Moroccan nationalist leader Allal al-Fassi who resided in the city between 1937 and 1946.

A 1947 population of 4,500 grew to 21,000 by 1960. An oil refinery was established by SOGARA in the 1960s, with natural gas added in 1968.

The town is now known for its hotels and its nightlife, while attractions include the St Louis Church (built in 1927), a zoo, a casino, beaches and a golf course, as well as the wildlife in local swamps.

== City districts ==
The city centre lies next to the harbour on the Port-Gentil Bay seaside. Hotels, banks, shops, and supermarkets (such as the Casino and Cecado brands) and the Casino de Port-Gentil are found within the downtown area between the Avenue Savorgnan de Brazzaville and the seaside. The area also concentrates a residential compound for foreign workforce. In the southern part, the BEAC building lies next to the port. The western Atlantic seaside is scarcely populated, mainly due to the presence of strong winds and sea currents. As is the case with other cities in Gabon, the authorities have not yet implemented house numbering in Port-Gentil, and the use of postal boxes is common.

== Climate ==
The Köppen-Geiger climate classification system classifies Port-Gentil's climate as tropical wet and dry (Aw). Despite the fact that the city lies in close proximity to the equator, Port-Gentil experiences noticeably warmer and cooler periods of the year with average temperatures in July (the city's coolest month) hovering at around 23.5 °C (74.3 °F) and average temperatures in February and March (the city's warmest months) at around 27 °C (81 °F). Port-Gentil features a lengthy wet season that runs from October through May and a relatively short dry season that covers the remaining four months. The city receives roughly 2,000 millimetres (79 in) of precipitation annually.

The highest recorded temperature was 38.0 °C (100.4 °F) on 26 February 2016; the lowest recorded temperature was 13.2 °C (55.8 °F) on 1 August 1953.

Climate data for Port-Gentil (1961–1990, extremes 1950–present)
Month	Jan	Feb	Mar	Apr	May	Jun	Jul	Aug	Sep	Oct	Nov	Dec	Year
Record high °C (°F)	32.6 (90.7)	38.0 (100.4)	34.6 (94.3)	33.7 (92.7)	33.2 (91.8)	33.2 (91.8)	30.8 (87.4)	33.1 (91.6)	33.3 (91.9)	33.0 (91.4)	34.0 (93.2)	35.0 (95.0)	38.0 (100.4)
Mean daily maximum °C (°F)	29.5 (85.1)	30.2 (86.4)	30.3 (86.5)	30.0 (86.0)	29.0 (84.2)	26.7 (80.1)	25.9 (78.6)	27.4 (81.3)	27.7 (81.9)	28.3 (82.9)	28.6 (83.5)	29.0 (84.2)	28.5 (83.3)
Daily mean °C (°F)	26.9 (80.4)	27.3 (81.1)	27.3 (81.1)	27.1 (80.8)	26.6 (79.9)	24.4 (75.9)	23.5 (74.3)	24.7 (76.5)	25.4 (77.7)	25.9 (78.6)	26.1 (79.0)	26.5 (79.7)	26.0 (78.8)
Mean daily minimum °C (°F)	24.2 (75.6)	24.4 (75.9)	24.3 (75.7)	24.2 (75.6)	24.1 (75.4)	22.0 (71.6)	21.1 (70.0)	21.9 (71.4)	23.0 (73.4)	23.5 (74.3)	23.5 (74.3)	24.0 (75.2)	23.3 (73.9)
Record low °C (°F)	17.6 (63.7)	19.4 (66.9)	19.5 (67.1)	18.0 (64.4)	19.0 (66.2)	16.4 (61.5)	16.0 (60.8)	13.2 (55.8)	18.2 (64.8)	19.5 (67.1)	15.8 (60.4)	18.2 (64.8)	13.2 (55.8)
Average precipitation mm (inches)	247.8 (9.76)	177.8 (7.00)	266.8 (10.50)	299.3 (11.78)	150.6 (5.93)	11.5 (0.45)	3.4 (0.13)	5.0 (0.20)	31.8 (1.25)	179.9 (7.08)	352.2 (13.87)	227.1 (8.94)	1,953.2 (76.90)
Average precipitation days	14.8	12.7	16.4	15.5	10.2	0.9	0.5	3.4	9.0	17.4	19.6	13.9	134.3
Average relative humidity (%)	84	84	83	84	85	84	83	82	82	84	86	84	84
Mean monthly sunshine hours	150.4	160.8	154.5	151.5	147.8	156.3	163.1	135.3	125.7	116.1	115.1	147.2	1,723.8
Source 1: NOAA
Source 2: Meteo Climat (record highs and lows)

== Transportation ==
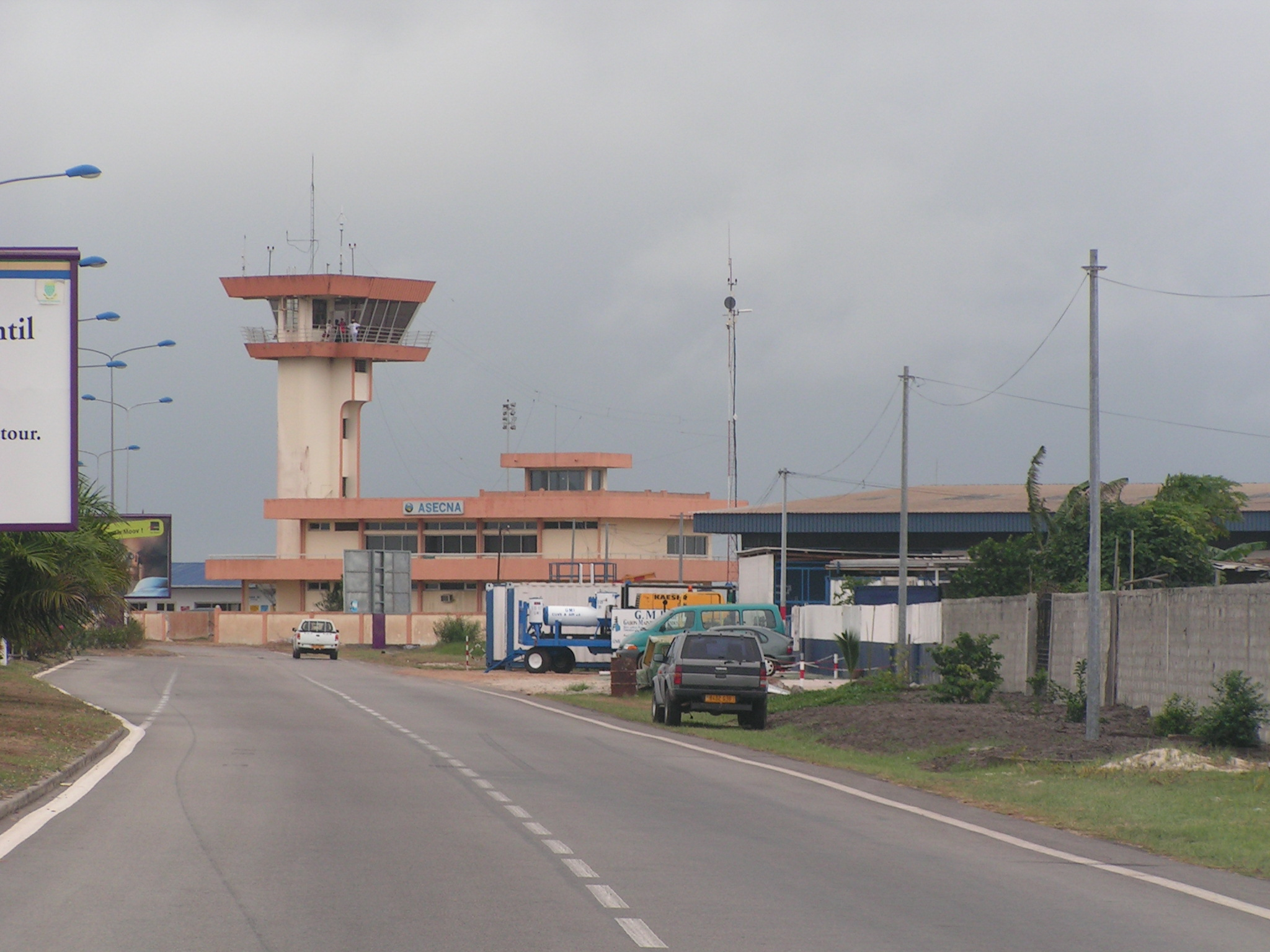
The airport in Port-Gentil

The city has an airport, Port-Gentil International Airport, serving as the main channel of transportation with the world. Regular flights connect it with Libreville, capital of Gabon.

Port-Gentil is connected to the mainland by a series of roads and bridges, stretching 93 km southwards along the coast to Omboué. The project was funded by a loan from the Export–Import Bank of China and constructed by the China Road and Bridge Corporation and GAUFF Engineering.

The limited number of paved roads within the city are poorly maintained. The roads are paved in the inner city up to the outskirts of the new residential districts in N'Tchengue, where sandy paths with frequent potholes prevail. Traffic jams are common in road junctions such as the Carrefour Tobia or Léon Mba, close to the downtown area. There are plenty of shared taxi services for which the price of a drive is negotiable, starting usually at 400 CFA Francs. The taxi fare usually doubles for night drives. A premium price (doubled fare) is requested for passengers travelling beyond paved roads, given the hardships of the road, lack or non existence of illuminated roads at night, or pedestrians randomly walking on the road. Most of the cars are obsolete given the prohibitively high cost of new imported cars. Furthermore, the lack of local car spareparts manufacturers underscores the need to import such parts from as far as Europe, the increased price as well as the lengthy delivery duration penalize altogether the traffic.

== Healthcare ==
Hospitals within Port-Gentil include:
* Clinique Mandji, located in the Littoral district on the Route de la Sobraga,
* Clinique du Littoral, located on the Boulevard du Gouverneur Pélieu,
* Centre du Traitement Ambulatoire on the road to N'Tchengue.

== Education ==
Schools include:

- École Mixte Port-Gentil or École publique conventionnée de Port-Gentil
- École primaire Léopold Sédar Senghor (French primary school)
- Lycée Français Victor Hugo de Port-Gentil (French secondary school)

== Places of worship ==
Among the places of worship, they are predominantly Christian churches and temples : Roman Catholic Diocese of Port-Gentil (Catholic Church), Assemblies of God, Evangelical Church of Gabon. There are also Muslim mosques.

== Notable residents ==
- Stéphane Lasme, professional basketball player
- Alexander N'Doumbou, professional footballer

== Gallery ==
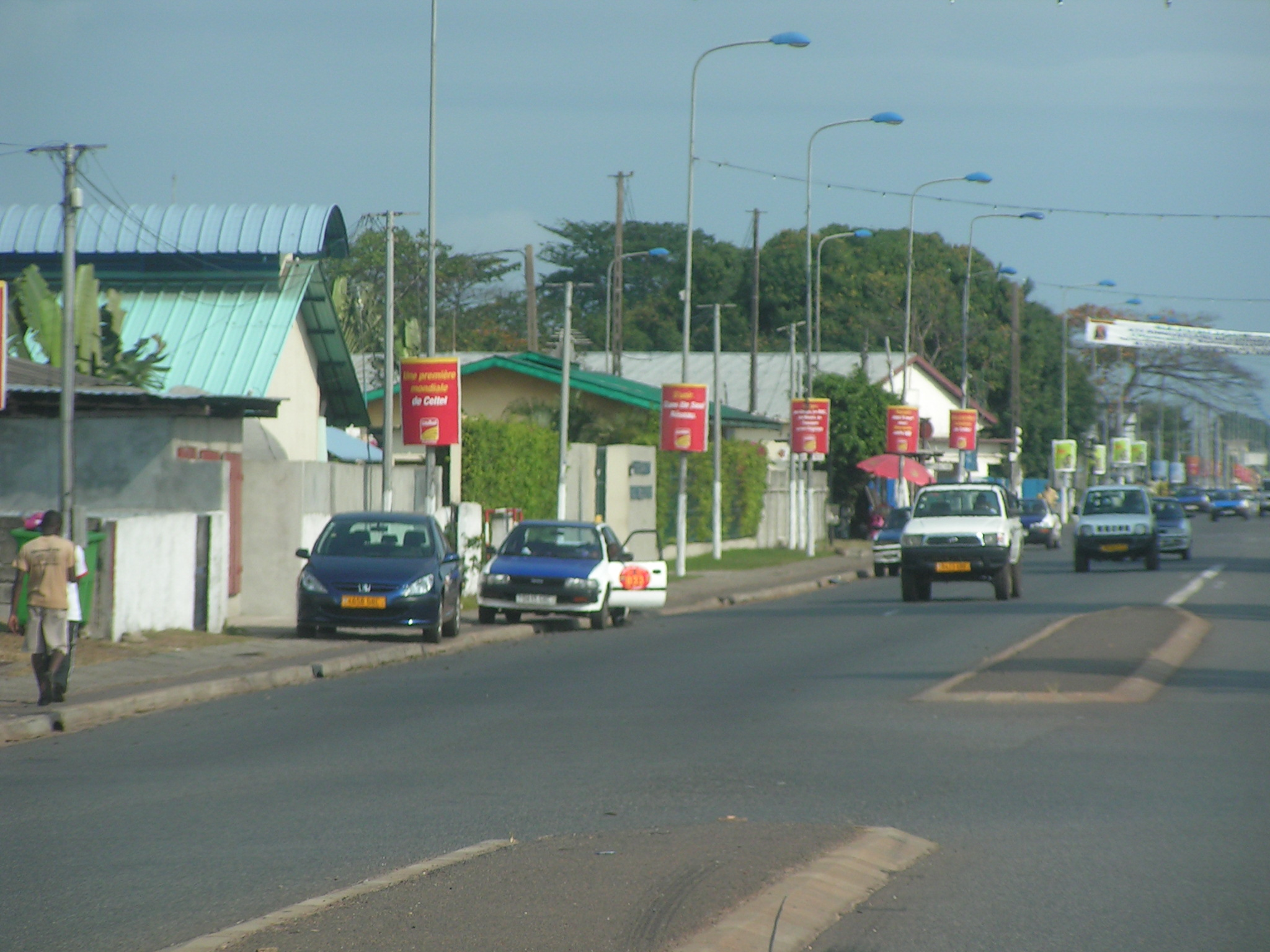
Main street

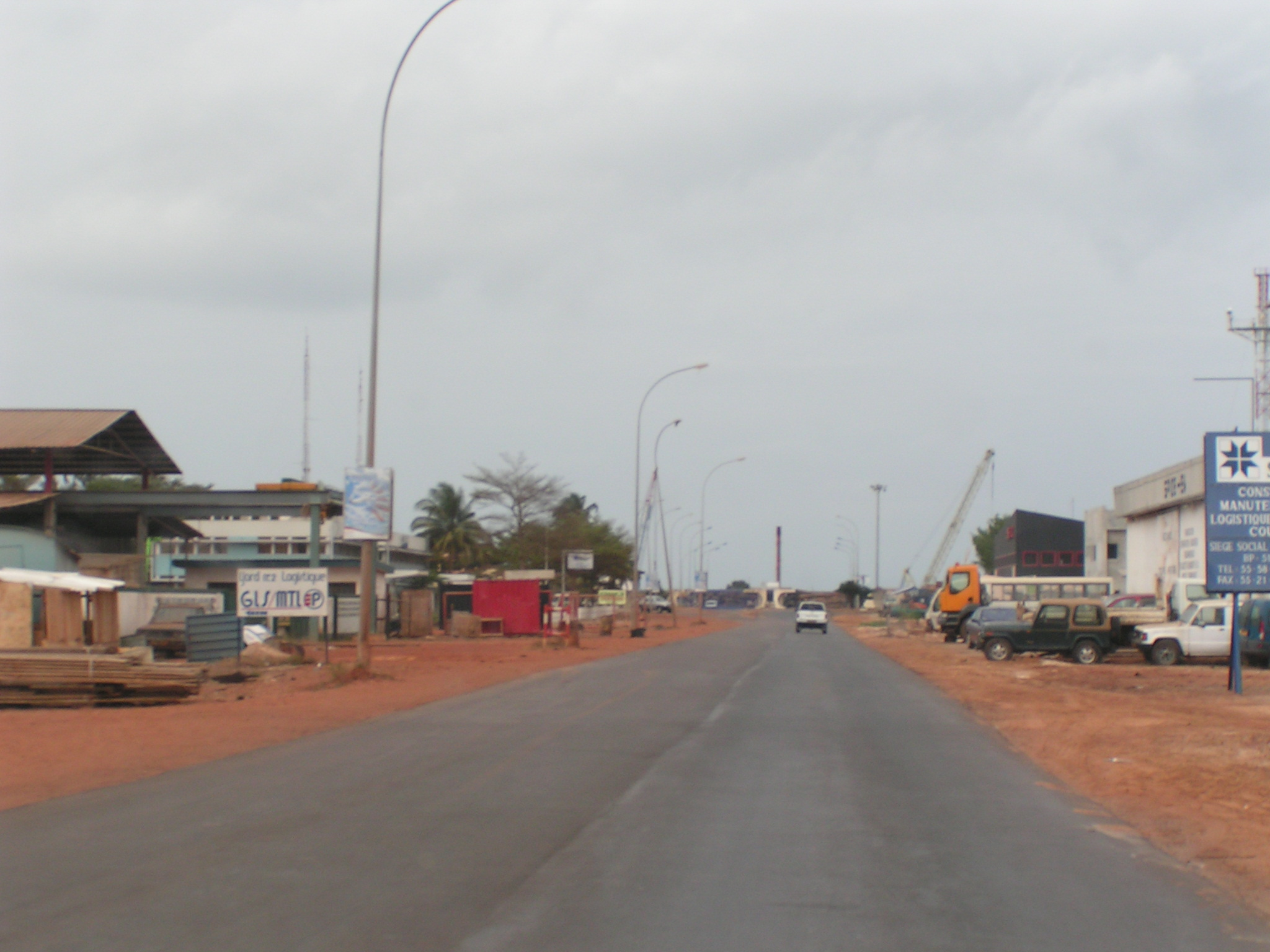
Street

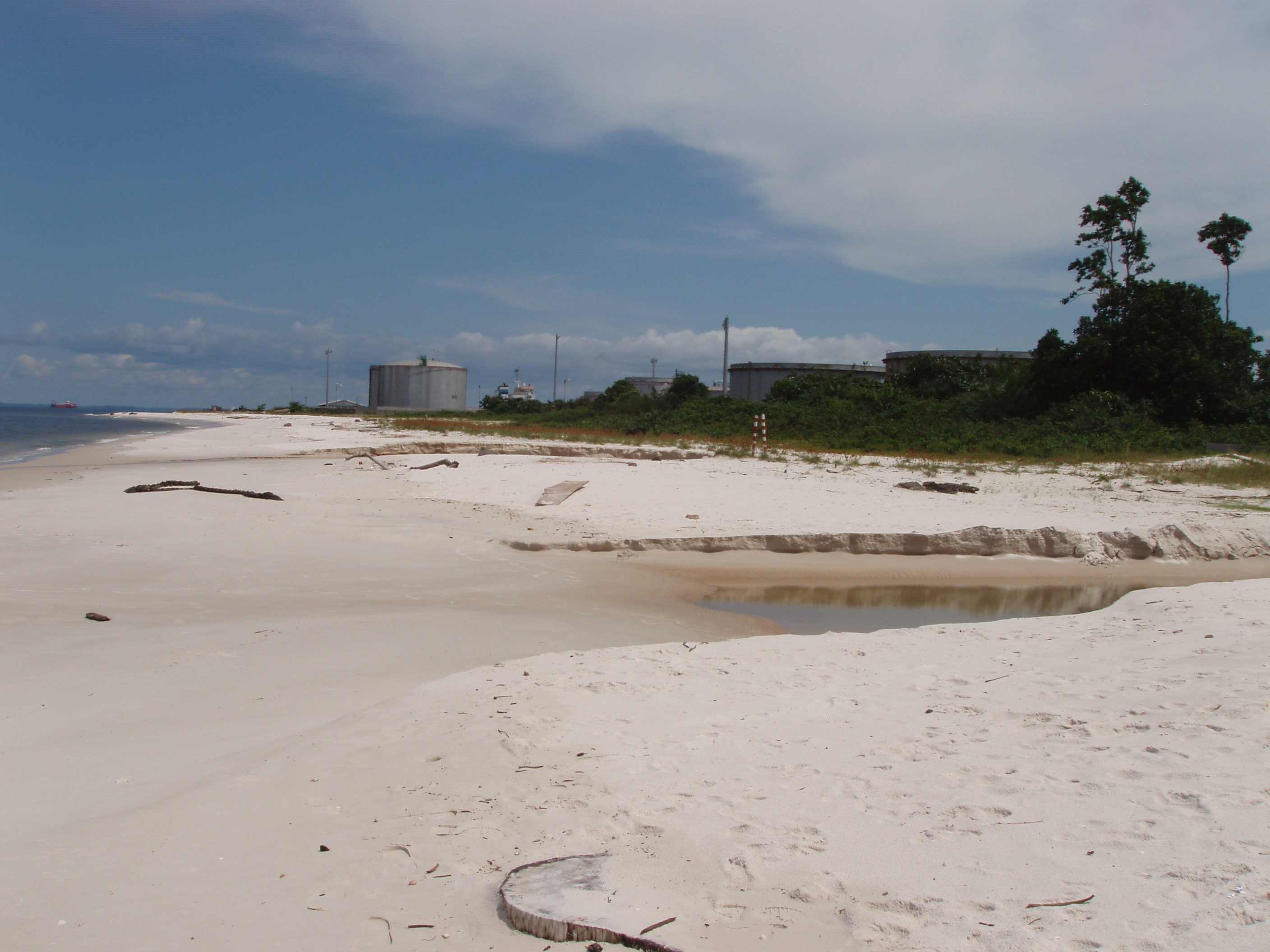
Beach

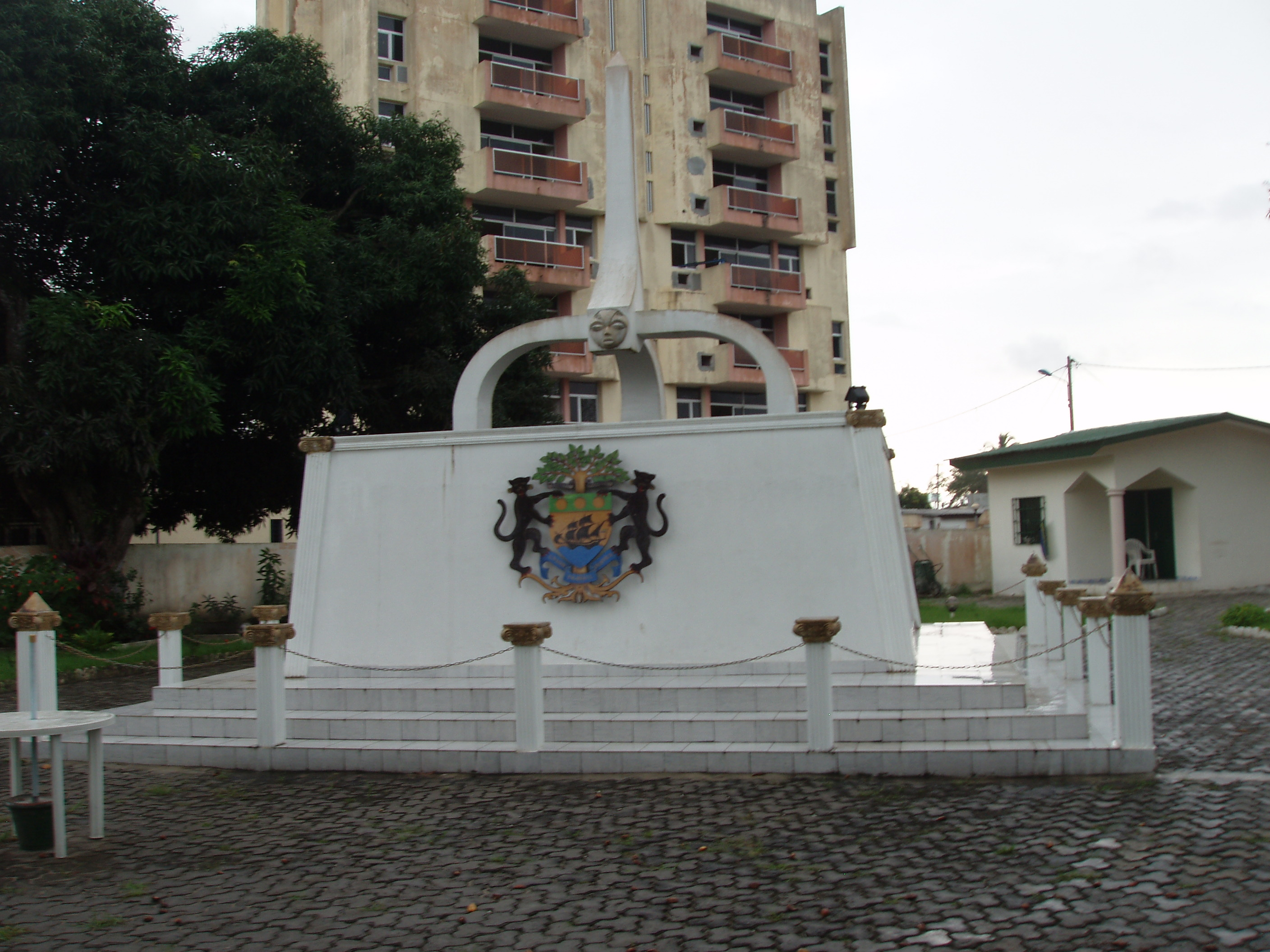
Fiftieth anniversary monument

== Sources ==
- David E. Gardinier, Historical Dictionary of Gabon, 2nd ed. (The Scarecrow Press, 1994) p. 275–276
- Port Gentil - the world's most expensive city, Time Magazine online, Mar 16 2007
