= Valentine Kalumba =

Zambian Roman Catholic prelate

- Bishop of Livinstone
- Church: Catholic Church
- Archdiocese: Roman Catholic Archdiocese of Lusaka
- See: Roman Catholic Diocese of Livingstone
- Appointed: 18 June 2016
- Predecessor: Raymond Mpezele
- Successor: Incumbent

Orders
- Ordination: 22 October 2005
- Consecration: 3 September 2016 by Raymond Mpezele
- Rank: Bishop

Personal details
- Born: Valentine Kalumba; January 16, 1967 (age 59) Mufulira, Mufulira District, Zambia

Styles of Valentine Kalumba
- Reference style: His Grace; The Most Reverend
- Spoken style: Your Grace
- Religious style: Bishop

Valentine Kalumba (born 16 January 1967) is a Zambian Catholic prelate who is the Bishop of the Diocese of Livingstone. He was appointed Bishop of Livingstone on 18 June 2016 by Pope Francis.

== Background and education ==
He was born on 16 January 1967, in the town of Mufulira, Copperbelt Province in the Archdiocese of Ndola, Zambia. He attended primary school and secondary school in his home area. In 1993 he spent a year at Emmaus Spirituality Centre in Lusaka considering "a calling to religious life". He then studied philosophy at seminaries in Zambia and in 2000 joined the Missionary Oblates of Mary Immaculate.

== Priesthood ==
Before his ordination as a priest, he joined the Zambian Airforce after high school and worked at Standard Chartered Bank.

He took his perpetual vows as a member of Oblates of Mary Immaculate on 20 February 2005. He was ordained a priest on 22 October 2005 by Bishop Paul Francis Duffy OMI, Bishop of Mongu.

While he was priest he held the following offices:

- Pastoral work at various parishes throughout Zambia.
- Director of Oblate Radio Liseli, which provides a network of religious and educational programming to a vast section of Western Zambia, from 2011 until 2014
- Pastor at Blessed Mary Theresa Parish in Kabwe Diocese, from 2014 until 2016.

== As bishop ==
On 18 June 2016 Pope Francis appointed Father Valentine Kalumba as Bishop of the Diocese of Livingstone in Zambia. He was consecrated bishop and installed on 3 September 2016 at Christ the King Cathedral in Livingstone, Zambia. The Principal Consecrator was Bishop Raymond Mpezele, Bishop Emeritus of Livingstone, assisted by Bishop George Cosmas Zumaire Lungu, Bishop of Chipata and Bishop Clement Mulenga SDB, Bishop of Kabwe.

== See also ==
- Edwin Mwansa Mulandu
- Catholicism in Zambia

== Succession table ==
Catholic Church titles
Preceded by Raymond Mpezele (1985 - 2016)	Bishop of Diocese of Livingstone; Since 3 September 2016	Succeeded by Incumbent
