= Archdiocese of Libreville =

Roman Catholic archdiocese in Gabon

Coordinates: 0.4028°N 9.4364°E

Archdiocese of Libreville Liberopolitanus

Location
- Country: Gabon

Statistics
- Area: 41,370 km^{2} (15,970 sq mi)
- Population: Total; Catholics: (as of 2004); 553,777; 289,500 (52.3%)

Information
- Rite: Latin Rite

Current leadership
- Pope: Leo XIV
- Archbishop: Jean-Patrick Iba-Ba
- Bishops emeritus: Basile Mvé Engone

The Roman Catholic Archdiocese of Libreville (French: Archidiocèse catholique romain de Libreville) is the Metropolitan See of the Latin Ecclesiastical province covering all Gabon.

Its cathedral episcopal see is the Cathédrale Notre Dame de l’Assomption of Libreville, the national capital, which also has a former cathedral of the same name (both dedicated to the Assumption of Mary).

== History ==
- 22 January 1842: Established as the Apostolic Prefecture of Two Guineas and Senegambia on vast West African and central African territories split off from the Diocese of Funchal on Madeira and the Diocese of Tomé in São Tomé and Príncipe, both Atlantic islands in colonial Portugal
- 1846: Promoted as the Apostolic Vicariate of Two Guineas and Senegambia, entitled to be led by a titular bishop
- Lost territories on 10 October 1855 to establish the Apostolic Vicariate of Annobon, Corisco and Fernando Poo Islands, on 13 April 1858 to establish the Apostolic Vicariate of Sierra Leone and on 28 August 1860 to establish the Apostolic Vicariate of Dahomey
- 6 February 1863: Renamed the Apostolic Vicariate of Two Guineas (Deux Guinées), having lost territory to establish the Apostolic Vicariate of Senegambia
- Lost more territories on 3 July 1879 to establish the Apostolic Prefecture of Cimbebasia, on 27 September 1879 to establish the Apostolic Prefecture of Gold Coast, on 2 May 1884 to establish the Apostolic Prefecture of Upper Niger, on 4 June 1886 to establish the Apostolic Vicariate of Congo français and on 22 November 1886 to establish the Mission sui juris of Congo Belge
- Renamed on 18 March 1890 the Apostolic Vicariate of Gabon, having lost territory to establish the Apostolic Prefecture of Cameroun
- 10 July 1947: Renamed the Apostolic Vicariate of Libreville after its see
- 14 September 1955: Promoted as the Diocese of Libreville
- 11 December 1958: Promoted as the Metropolitan Archdiocese of Libreville
- Lost territory on 29 May 1969 to establish the Diocese of Oyem as its own suffragan
- Was visited by Pope John Paul II on 18–19 February 1982
- Lost territory on 19 March 2003 to establish the Diocese of Port-Gentil as its suffragan.

== Leadership ==
Apostolic Prefects of Two Guineas and Senegambia

- Edward Barron (1842.10.03 – 1844.09.03), Titular Bishop of Constantina (1842.10.03 – 1844.03.02), emeritus as Titular Bishop of Eucarpia (1844.03.02 – death 1854.09.12)
- Fr. Eugène Tisserant 1844 – death 1846,

Apostolic Vicars of Two Guineas and Senegambia

- Jean-Benoît Truffet, C.S.Sp. 1846.09.22 – death 1847.11.23, Titular Bishop of Callipolis (1846.09.22 – 1847.11.23)
- Jean René Bessieux, C.S.Sp. (1848.06.20 – death 1863.02.06), Titular Bishop of Callipolis (1848.06.20 – 1876.04.30)

Apostolic Vicar of Two Guineas

- Jean-René Bessieux, C.S.Sp. (1863.02.06 – death 1876.04.30)

Apostolic Vicars of Gabon

- Pierre-Marie Le Berre, C.S.Sp. 1877.09.07 – 1891.07.16, Titular Bishop of Arca in Phoenicia (1877.09.07 – 1891.07.16)
- Alexandre-Louis-Victor-Aimé Le Roy, C.S.Sp. 1892.07.03 – 1896.05.24, Titular Bishop of Alinda (1892.07.03 – 1921.05.13); later superior general of the Congregation of the Holy Spirit (1896.07 – 1926), retired as Titular Archbishop of Caria (see) (1921.05.13 – 1938.04.21)
- Jean Martin Adam, C.S.Sp. 1897.02.16 – 1914.05.07, Titular Bishop of Thmuis (1897.02.16 – death 1929.01.14)
- Louis Jean Martrou, C.S.Sp. 1914.05.07 – death 1925.03.22, succeeding as former Coadjutor Vicar Apostolic of Gabon (Gabon) (1912.12.10 – 1914.05.07) & Titular Bishop of Corycus (1912.12.10 – 1925.03.22)
- Louis-Michel-François Tardy, C.S.Sp. 1926.01.04 – death 1947.01.28, Titular Bishop of Acalissus (1925.12.18 – 1947.01.28)

Apostolic Vicar of Libreville

- Jean-Jerôme Adam, C.S.Sp. (1947.07.10 – 1955.09.14 see below), Titular Bishop of Rhinocorura (1947.07.10 – 1955.09.14)

Bishop of Libreville

- Jean-Jerôme Adam, C.S.Sp. (1955.09.14 – 1958.12.11)

Metropolitan Archbishops of Libreville

- Jean-Jerôme Adam, C.S.Sp. (1958.12.11 – 1969.05.29), emeritus as Titular Archbishop of Brescello (1969.05.29 – 1976.10.27)
- André Fernand Anguilé (1969.05.29 – retired 1998.04.03), also President of Episcopal Conference of Gabon (1970 – 1981)
- Basile Mvé Engone, S.D.B. (3 April 1998 – 12 March 2020); also President of Episcopal Conference of Gabon (1989 – 2005), President of the Association of Episcopal Conferences of the Central Africa Region (1994 – 1997); previously Coadjutor Bishop of Oyem (1980.04.24 – 1982.08.23), succeeding as Bishop of Oyem (23 August 1982 – 3 April 1998)
- Jean-Patrick Iba-Ba (12 March 2020 - present), previously bishop of Franceville

=== Coadjutor Vicars Apostolic ===
- Aloys Kobès (1848–1863), did not succeed to see; appointed apostolic vicar of Senegambia, Senegal
- Louis Jean Martrou, C.S.Sp. (1912–1914)

=== Auxiliary Bishops ===
- Mathieu Madega Lebouankehan (2000–2003), appointed bishop of Port-Gentil on 19 March 2003
- François Ndong (1960–1969), appointed Bishop of Oyem

=== Other priests of this diocese who became bishops ===
- Jean-Patrick Iba-Ba, appointed bishop of Franceville on 4 November 2017; later returned to Libreville as archbishop
- Euzébius Chinekezy Ogbonna Managwu, appointed bishop of Port-Gentil on 12 January 2016

== Province ==
Its ecclesiastical province comprises the Metropolitan's own see and the following suffragan bishoprics, all in Gabon:

- Roman Catholic Diocese of Franceville
- Roman Catholic Diocese of Mouila
- Roman Catholic Diocese of Oyem
- Roman Catholic Diocese of Port-Gentil

== See also ==
- List of Roman Catholic dioceses in Gabon
