= Lycée Français Victor Hugo de Port-Gentil =

Location
- Port-Gentil; Gabon
- Coordinates: 0.7079°S 8.7806°E

Information
- Established: 1990; 36 years ago
- Grades: 6^{e} – Terminale (6–12)
- Enrollment: 325 (as of 2014)

Lycée Français Victor Hugo de Port-Gentil is a French secondary international school in Port-Gentil, Gabon. It serves collège (junior high school) and lycée (senior high school) levels, and was established in 1990. In September 2014, it had 325 students.

The school is named after the 19th-century French writer Victor Hugo.

== See also ==
- Education in Gabon
- List of international schools
