= Diocese of Oyem =

Roman Catholic diocese in Gabon

Diocese of Oyem Dioecesis Oyemen(sis)

Location
- Country: Gabon
- Metropolitan: Libreville

Statistics
- Area: 84,540 km^{2} (32,640 sq mi)
- Population: Total; Catholics: (as of 2004); 159,615; 78,020 (48.9%)

Information
- Rite: Latin Rite
- Established: 29 May 1969; 56 years ago

Current leadership
- Pope: Leo XIV
- Bishop: Jean-Vincent Ondo Eyene

The Roman Catholic Diocese of Oyem (Latin: Oyemen(sis), French: Diocèse catholique romain d'Oyem) is a diocese located in the city of Oyem in the ecclesiastical province of Libreville in Gabon.

== History ==
- 29 May 1969: Established as Diocese of Oyem from the Metropolitan Archdiocese of Libreville
- 19 March 2003: Lost territory to the erection of the Apostolic Prefecture of Makokou.

== Bishops of Oyem ==
- François Ndong (29 May 1969 – 23 August 1982)
- Basile Mvé Engone, S.D.B. (23 August 1982 – 3 April 1998), appointed archbishop of Libreville
- Jean-Vincent Ondo Eyene (18 March 2000 – present)

Coadjutor Bishops

- Basile Mvé Engone, S.D.B. (1980-1982)

== See also ==
- Roman Catholicism in Gabon
