= Elias White Mutale =

Zambian Roman Catholic prelate

- Bishop
- Church: Catholic Church
- Archdiocese: Roman Catholic Archdiocese of Kasama
- See: Roman Catholic Archdiocese of Kasama
- Appointed: 17 September 1973
- Term ended: 12 February 1990
- Predecessor: Clemens P. Chabukasansha
- Successor: James Mwewa Spaita
- Other post: Bishop of Diocese of Mansa (1971 - 1973)

Orders
- Ordination: 6 September 1964
- Consecration: 12 September 1971 by Clemens P. Chabukasansha
- Rank: Archbishop

Personal details
- Born: Elias White Mutale; November 21, 1929 Cikamutumba, Northern Province, Zambia
- Died: 12 February 1990 (aged 60) Lusaka, Zambia

Styles of Elias White Mutale
- Reference style: His Grace; The Most Reverend
- Spoken style: Your Grace
- Religious style: Bishop

Elias White Mutale (21 November 1929 - 12 February 1990) was a Zambian Catholic prelate, who was the Archbishop of the Archdiocese of Kasama, in Zambia. He was appointed Archbishops of Kasama on 17 September 1973 by Pope Paul VI. He died as Archbishop of Kasama on 12 February 1990, in a road traffic accident in Lusaka, Zambia's capital city. For a period of two years from 1971 until 1973, he was the Bishop of the Roman Catholic Diocese of Mansa, a position he was appointed to by Pope Paul VI, on 3 July 1971. Father Elias White Mutale was consecrated bishop and installed on 12 September 1971.

== See also ==
- Edwin Mwansa Mulandu
- Catholicism in Zambia

== Succession table ==
Catholic Church titles
Preceded by Clemens P. Chabukasansha (1965 - 1973)	Archbishop of Archdiocese of Kasama; 1973 - 1990	Succeeded by James Mwewa Spaita (1990 - 2009)
Preceded by René-Georges Pailloux (1952 - 1971)	Bishop of Diocese of Mansa; 1971 - 1973	Succeeded by James Mwewa Spaita (1974 - 1990)
