= James Mwewa Spaita =

- Archbishop of Kasama
- Church: Catholic Church
- Archdiocese: Archdiocese of Kasama
- In office: 3 December 1990 – 30 April 2009
- Predecessor: Elias White Mutale
- Successor: Ignatius Chama
- Previous post: Bishop of Mansa (1974-1990)

Orders
- Ordination: 9 September 1962
- Consecration: 28 April 1974 by Elias White Mutale

Personal details
- Born: 8 April 1934
- Died: 4 November 2014 (aged 80)

James Mwewa Spaita (April 8, 1934 – November 4, 2014) was a Roman Catholic archbishop, born in Bombwe.

Ordained to the priesthood on September 9, 1962, Spaita was named bishop of the Roman Catholic Diocese of Mansa. Zambia on February 28, 1974 and was ordained bishop on April 28, 1974. On December 3, 1990, Spaita was appointed archbishop of the Roman Catholic Archdiocese of Kasama, Zambia and retired on April 30, 2009.
