= Saint-Christophe-en-Brionnais =

- Commune
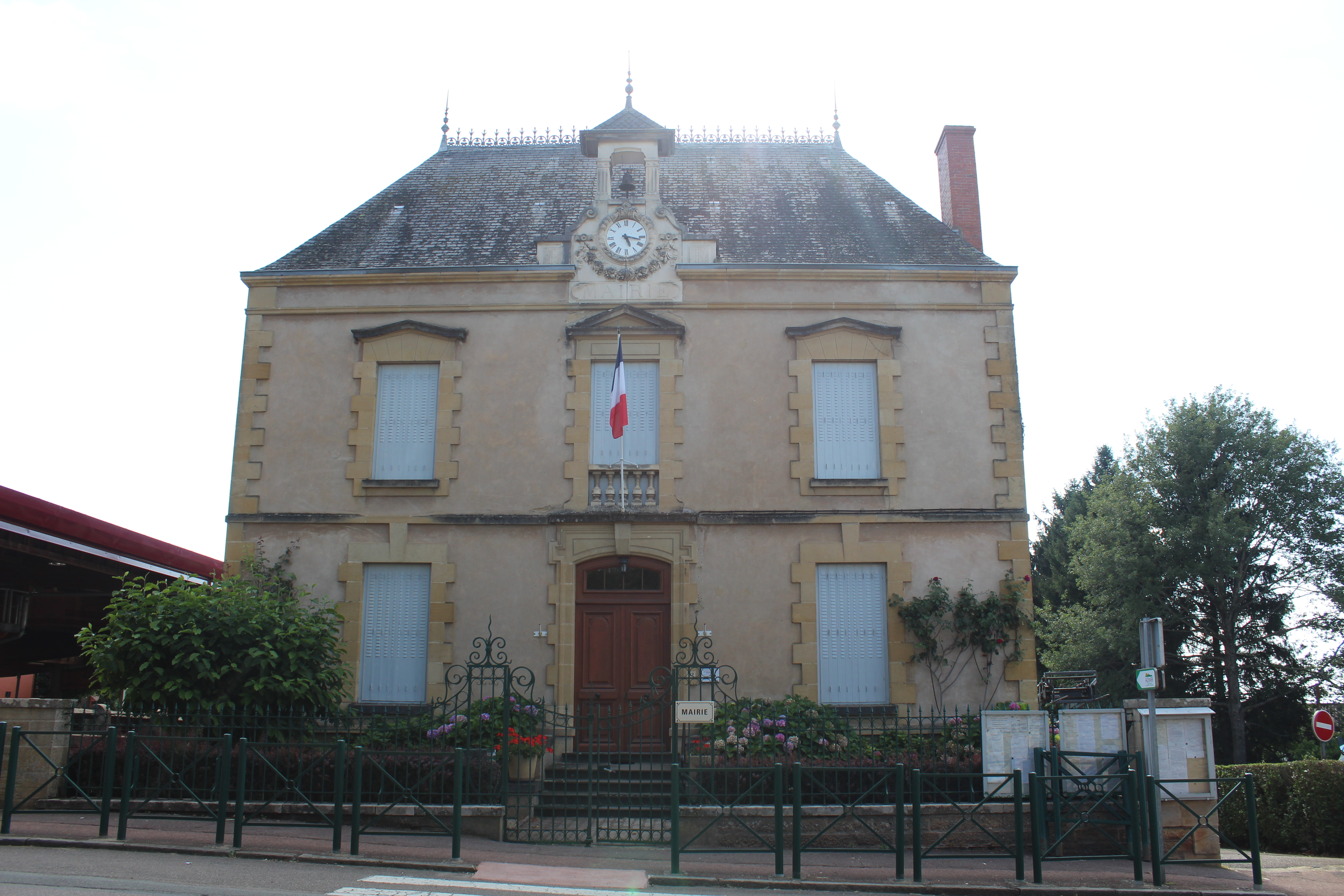
- The town hall in Saint-Christophe-en-Brionnais
- Location of Saint-Christophe-en-Brionnais
- Location within France Location within Bourgogne-Franche-Comté
- Coordinates: 46°17′24″N 4°10′44″E
- Country: France
- Region: Bourgogne-Franche-Comté
- Department: Saône-et-Loire
- Arrondissement: Charolles
- Canton: Chauffailles

Government
  - Mayor (2023–2026): Bernard Patteeuw
- Area^{1}: 15.07 km^{2} (5.82 sq mi)
- Elevation: 425 m (1,394 ft)
- Highest elevation: 508 m (1,667 ft)
- Lowest elevation: 335 m (1,099 ft)
- Population (2023): 503
  - Density: 33.4/km^{2} (86.4/sq mi)
- Time zone: UTC+01:00 (CET)
  - Summer (DST): UTC+02:00 (CEST)
- INSEE/Postal code: 71399 /71800
- ^{1} French Land Register data, which excludes lakes, ponds, glaciers > 1 km^{2} (0.386 sq mi or 247 acres) and river estuaries.

Saint-Christophe-en-Brionnais (French pronunciation: [sɛ̃ kʁistɔf ɑ̃ bʁijɔnɛ]) is a commune in the Saône-et-Loire department in the region of Bourgogne-Franche-Comté in eastern France.

== See also ==
- Communes of the Saône-et-Loire department
