= List of Catholic dioceses in Guinea-Bissau =

The Roman Catholic Church in Guinea-Bissau is composed of 2 dioceses.

== List of dioceses ==
=== Episcopal Conference of Guinea-Bissau ===
==== Immediately Subject to the Holy See ====
- Diocese of Bafatá
- Diocese of Bissau
