= Diocese of Mansa =

Roman Catholic diocese in Zambia

Coordinates: 11.2018°S 28.8904°E

Diocese of Mansa Dioecesis Mansaensis
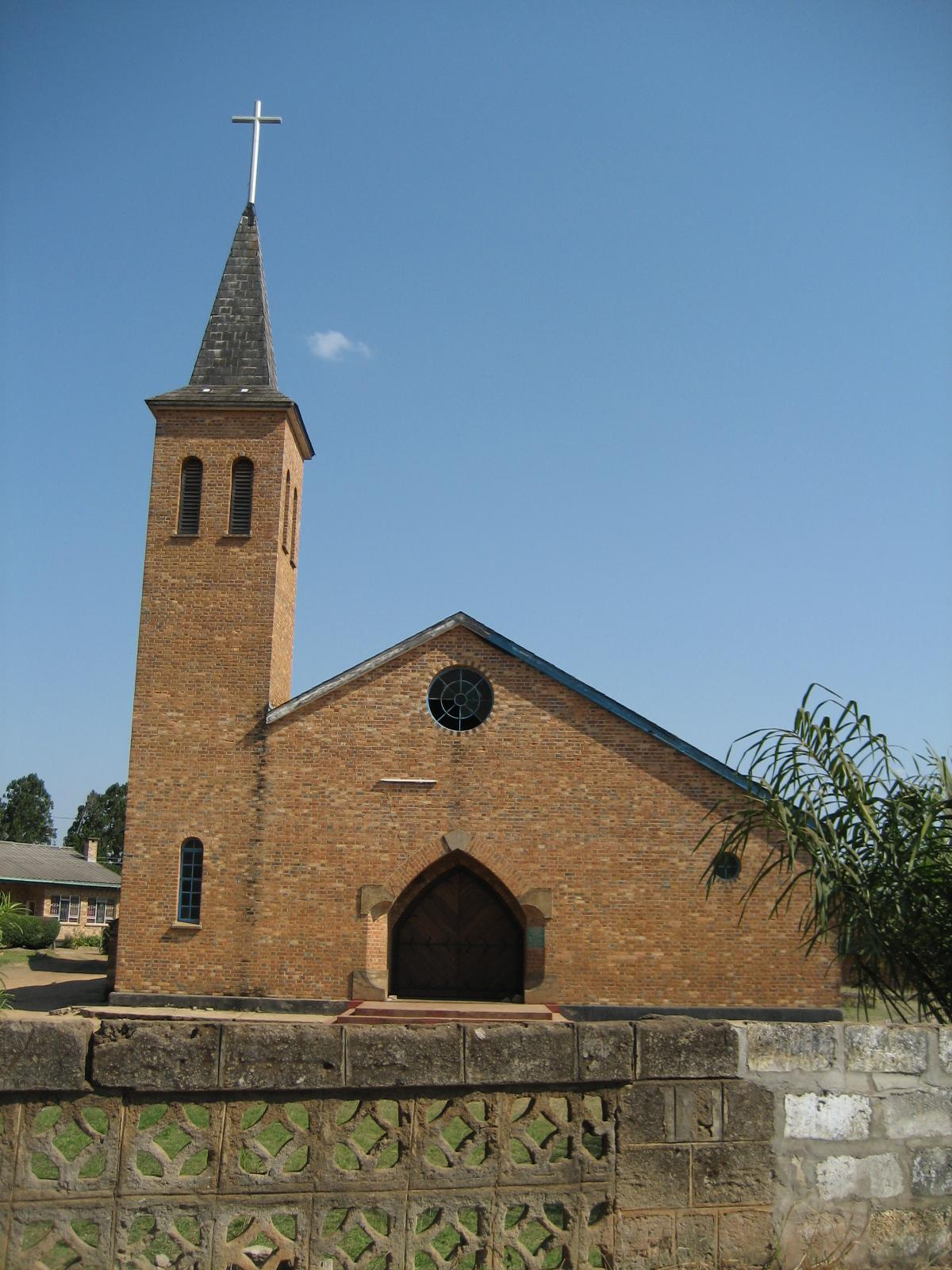
- Cathedral of the Assumption of Our Lady in Mansa

Location
- Country: Zambia
- Ecclesiastical province: Kasama

Statistics
- Area: 44,000 km^{2} (17,000 sq mi)
- Population: Total; Catholics: (as of 2004); 927,197; 474,252 (51.1%)

Information
- Rite: Roman Rite
- Cathedral: Mansa Cathedral Parish of the Assumption

Current leadership
- Pope: Leo XIV
- Bishop: Patrick Chilekwa Chisanga, O.F.M. Conv.
- Bishops emeritus: Andrew Aaron Chisha

The Roman Catholic Archdiocese of Mansa (Latin: Mansaën(sis)) is a suffragan diocese in the city of Mansa in the ecclesiastical province of Kasama in Zambia.

== History ==
- July 10, 1952: Established as Apostolic Prefecture of Fort Rosebery from the Apostolic Vicariate of Bangueolo
- January 3, 1961: Promoted as Diocese of Fort Rosebery
- November 22, 1967: Renamed as Diocese of Mansa

== Bishops ==
- Prefect Apostolic of Fort Rosebery (Roman rite)
  - Fr. René-Georges Pailloux, M. Afr. (1952.11.07 – 1961.01.03 see below)
- Bishop of Fort Rosebery (Roman rite)
  - Bishop René-Georges Pailloux, M. Afr. (see above 1961.01.03 – 1967.11.22 see below)
- Bishops of Mansa (Latin Church)
  - Bishop René-Georges Pailloux, M. Afr. (see above 1967.11.22 – 1971.07.03)
  - Bishop Elias White Mutale (1971.07.03 – 1973.09.17), appointed Archbishop of Kasama
  - Bishop James Mwewa Spaita (1974.02.28 – 1990.12.03), appointed Archbishop of Kasama
  - Bishop Andrew Aaron Chisha (1993.07.01 - 2009.01.15)
  - Bishop Patrick Chilekwa Chisanga, O.F.M. Conv. (2013.11.30 - )

=== Auxiliary Bishop ===
- Clemens P. Chabukasansha (1963-1965), appointed Bishop of Kasama

=== Other priest of this diocese who became bishop ===
- Ignatius Chama, appointed Bishop of Mpika in 2008. Appointed Archbishop of Kasama on 2012.

== See also ==
- Roman Catholicism in Zambia
