= Evangelical Church of Gabon =

Christian church

The Evangelical Church of Gabon (French: Église Evangélique du Gabon) belongs to the Reformed family of churches.

== History ==
It was created by American missionaries, the American Board of Foreign Missions worked in Gabon between 1842 and 1870. The Board of Foreign Mission of the Presbyterian Church (USA) worked from 1870 to 1913. The Paris Mission Society took over the mission till 1961, when the Evangelical Church of Gabon become independent. The church underwent several splits, and the denomination had hard times in the 1970s.

In 1997 the Synod was formed. In April 2005 several dissenting groups reunified. From this time the united denomination extended its activities to south Gabon.

== 21st century ==
The church accepts the La Rochelle Confession of Faith. It is a member of the World Council of Churches, the Fellowship of Christian Councils and Churches of Central Africa.

Since 2004 women were accepted to the ministry.

In 2016, the church had 20,500 members. In 2020, 79.52% of the population had a Christian background; most of these were Catholic.

In 2022, Louis-Sylvain Allogho Engo became the president of the church.

== See also ==
- Religion in Gabon
- Roman Catholicism in Gabon
