= Okolo =

Okolo is a surname. Notable people with the surname include:

- Bartho Okolo, Nigerian biologist
- Courtney Okolo (born 1994), American sprinter
- Jude Thaddeus Okolo (born 1956), Nigerian bishop
- Vera Okolo (born 1985), Nigerian footballer
- Wendy Okolo, Nigerian-American aerospace research engineer
