= Religion in Gabon =

Religion in Gabon (2019-2021 DHS survey)
1. Christianity (80.2%)
2. Islam (10.8%)
3. No religion (7.00%)
4. Traditional faiths (1.10%)
5. Other religions (0.90%)

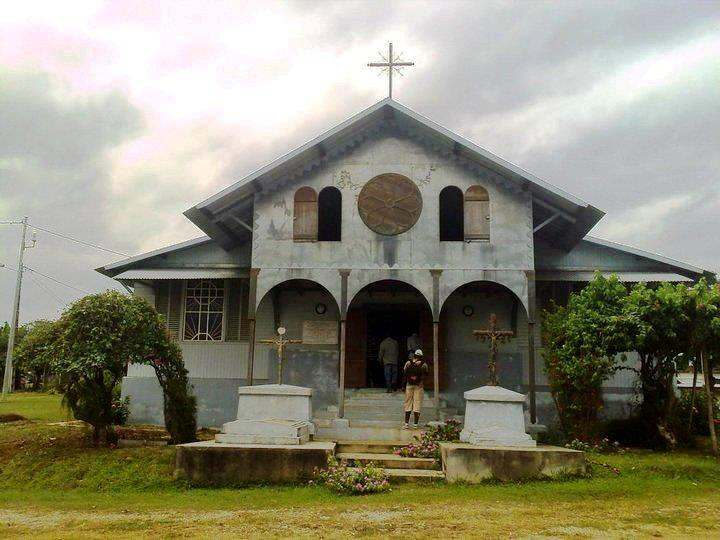
St. Lucy's Cathedral in Donguila

Christianity is the predominant religion in Gabon, with significant minorities of the adherents of Islam and traditional faiths.

Gabon is a secular state and the constitution ensures freedom of religion. Many people practice elements of both Christianity and traditional indigenous religious beliefs. Christmas, Easter, Ascension Day, Assumption Day, All Saints' Day, Pentecost, Eid al-Fitr, and Eid al-Adha are recognised as public holidays. The 2022 Afrobarometer found that 40.4% of the population identified as Nondenominational Christian, 7.2% Evangelical, 5.3% Pentecostal and 22.5% as Catholic.

== Statistics ==
=== Demographic and Health Surveys ===
Gabon has had three Demographic and Health Surveys (DHS) conducted since the 21st century, all of which collected data on the religious affiliation of Gabonese respondents. The most recent DHS survey was conducted between 2019 and 2021.

Censuses generally do not record or release information on religious affiliation, with estimates from religious leaders and government agencies varying significantly.

Religion	DHS Surveys					
Religion	2000		2012		2021	
Religion	#	%	#	%	#	%
Christianity	6,590	80.5	11,090	82.0	12,648	80.2
—Catholicism	4,476	54.7	5,720	42.3	4,703	29.8
—Protestantism^{*}	1,266	15.5	1,662	12.3	7,316	46.4
—Other Christian	848	10.3	3,708	27.4	629	4.0
Islam	627	7.6	1,328	9.8	1,703	10.8
Traditional faiths	56	0.7	80	0.6	170	1.1
Other^{**}	107	1.3	65	0.5	138	0.9
No religion	808	9.9	967	7.1	1,105	7.0
Total sample	8,188	100	13,530	100	15,764	100
*Protestantism includes revival churches in the 2021 survey. **Other includes no responses to the religion question.

== History ==
Christianity arrived in Gabon through the Portuguese traders in early 16th century. The Italian Capuchin friars set up Christian missions in the 17th century. The Portuguese missionaries and Italian friars' cooperation ended in the 18th century, and the Portuguese officials expelled the Capuchin friars in 1777. New missions such as the Sacred Heart and Holy Ghost, as well as Protestant missions from Europe arrived in the mid 19th century. Catholicism had established itself in Gabon with the Portuguese colonial efforts in 18th century and grown to be the leading denomination by 1900. With the start of French colonial rule, Christian missions from Paris arrived between 1890s and 1960. More evangelical Churches have grown since the mid 20th century.

The Babongo are a forest people of Gabon on the west coast of equatorial Africa. They are the originators of the Bwiti religion. Other peoples in Gabon have combined traditional Bwiti practices with animism and Christian concepts to produce a very different modern form of Bwiti. The Bwiti rituals form part of the initiation into the Babongo people. Babonga people's lives are highly ritualised through dance, music and ceremony associated with natural forces and jungle animals. Other traditional religions practised in Gabon include Mwiri and Ndiobi.

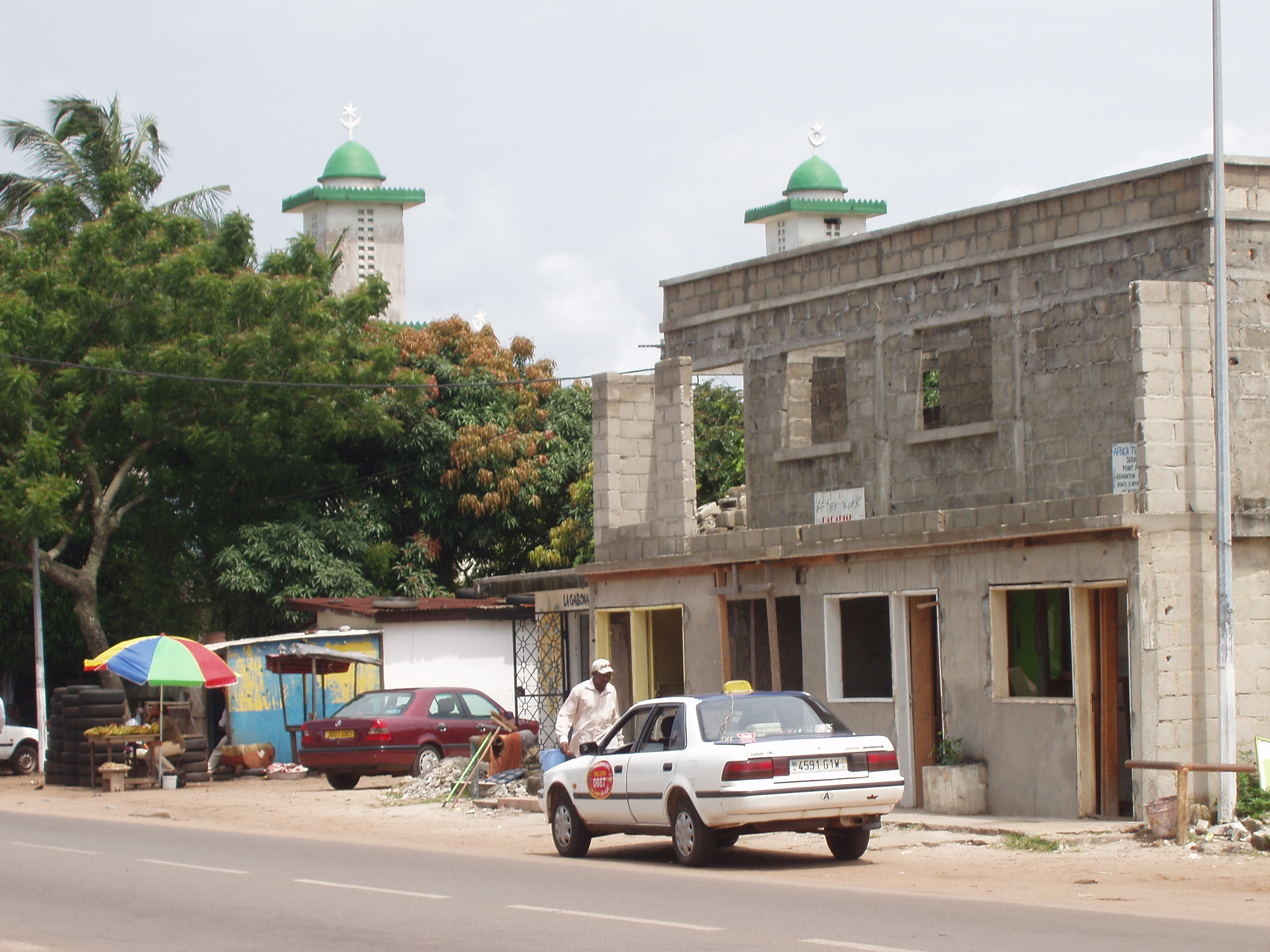
Mosque in Port-Gentil Gabon

Islam is the second largest religion in Gabon, with about 11% of the people following Sunni practice. The former president Omar Bongo converted to Islam in 1973 after a visit to Libya. Under Bongo's one-party rule, Gabon joined the Organisation of Islamic Cooperation in 1974. Gabon reintroduced multiparty democracy in 1993, though Bongo remained president until his death in 2009, upon which his son, also a Muslim, succeeded him. As of 2022, the High Council of Islamic Affairs in Gabon estimates approximately 12% of the population identifies as Muslim, including noncitizens of West African background.

The Constitution provides for freedom of religion, and the government generally respects this right in practice.

On February 3, 2016, the Gabonese Republic granted official recognition to the local Orthodox Church, including plans to erect the first Orthodox church in the capital city Libreville.

== Religious freedom ==
In 2023, the country was scored 3 out of 4 for religious freedom; it was noted that some religious groups reported difficulty in registering with the government.

== See also ==
- Evangelical Church of Gabon
- Islam in Gabon
- Roman Catholicism in Gabon
