= Jean-Rémy Bessieux =

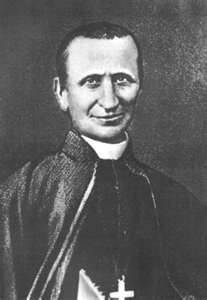
Mgr Jan-Rémy Bessieux.

Jean-Rémy Bessieux (24 December 1803 – 30 April 1876), also seen as Jean-Rémi or Jean René, was the founder of the Roman Catholic mission in Gabon and the first bishop to serve there.

Bessieux was born in Vélieux in Montpellier, France, to a farming family; he was ordained in 1829.

He served as a parish priest and seminary teacher before he entered the Holy Heart of Mary Congregation in August 1842. (The group had been founded to evangelize newly freed slaves who were returning to Africa; it merged with the Holy Ghost Fathers in 1848.)

On 13 September 1843, Bessieux and several missionaries and laymen left Bordeaux on “Les deux Clementintes” to sail for West Africa; most of the passengers died during the journey and Bishop Edward Barron reported that all had died and the mission was to be closed. However, travelling with Brother Grégoire Say, Bessieux arrived in Gabon September 1844. They settled at Okolo, a village in the Agekaza-Quaben clan's area, not far from the French fort. Bessieux learned Mpongwe, and published a grammar of it in 1847. He also established a school for boys, a church, and arranged the 1849 arrival of the Immaculate Conception Sisters of Castres.

Bessieux published a Pongwe dictionary in 1847, as well as several other books.

He was elevated to bishop in December 1848. His efforts in the 1850s to establish additional outposts in the Gabon Estuary were not successful. Even so, he continued in Gabon and Senegal until his death in 1876, sometimes without official support, and with only occasional brief visits to Europe to recover his health. Gardinier observes that Bessieux's determination to stay in Gabon probably influenced the French government's decision to maintain their base.

During one of his visits to France, he met Mother Marie de Villeneuve and assisted her with her new missionary society, the Sisters of the Immaculate Conception of Castres.

Bessieux was remembered on the 100th anniversary of his death by a postage stamp of Gabon.
