= Archdiocese of Kasama =

Roman Catholic archdiocese in Zambia

Coordinates: 10.2117°S 31.1783°E

Archdiocese of Kasama Archidioecesis Kasamaënsis
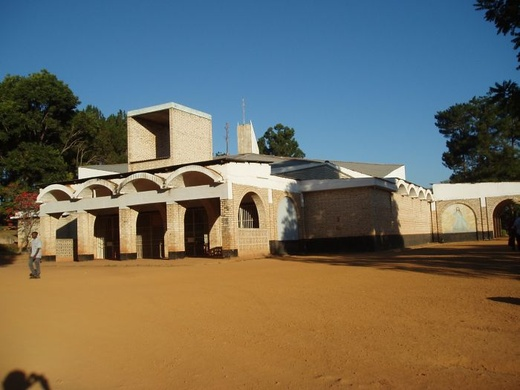
- St. John the Apostle Cathedral in Kasama

Location
- Country: Zambia
- Territory: Northern Province, Zambia
- Ecclesiastical province: Kasama

Statistics
- Area: 59.13 km^{2} (22.83 sq mi)
- Population: Total; Catholics: 1,216,000; 570,130 (46.9%%)
- Parishes: 23

Information
- Denomination: Catholic
- Sui iuris church: Latin Church
- Rite: Roman Rite
- Established: 28 January 1913
- Archdiocese: 1967
- Cathedral: St. John the Apostle Cathedral, Kasama
- Secular priests: 54

Current leadership
- Pope: Leo XIV
- Metropolitan Archbishop: Ignatius Chama
- Suffragans: Mansa, Mpika

Map
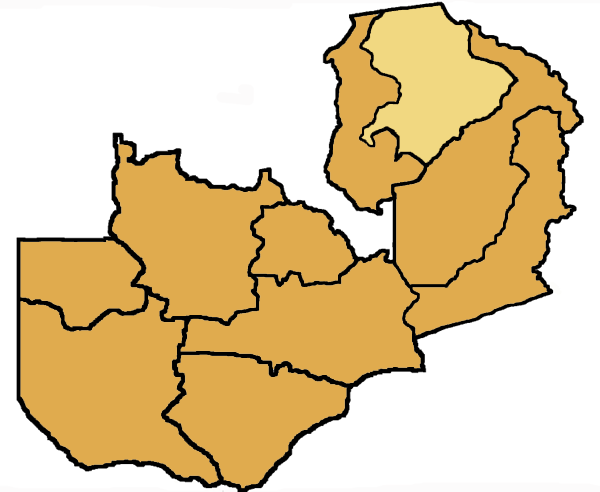
- The Northern Province of Zambia which is the territory of the Archdiocese of Kasama

The Roman Catholic Archdiocese of Kasama (Latin: Kasamaën(sis)) is the Metropolitan See for the ecclesiastical province of Kasama in Zambia.

== History ==
- January 28, 1913: Established as Apostolic Vicariate of Bangueolo from the Apostolic Vicariate of Nyassa in Malawi.
- May 23, 1933: Mission of Lwangwa is separated.
- July 10, 1952: Western part of the vicariate became Apostolic Prefecture of Fort Rosebery, eastern part becomes Apostolic Vicariate of Kasama.
- April 25, 1959: Promoted as Diocese of Kasama.
- June 12, 1967: Promoted as Metropolitan Archdiocese of Kasama.

== Special churches ==
The seat of the archbishop is the Cathedral of St. John the Apostle in Kasama.

== Bishops ==
- Vicars Apostolic of Bangueolo (Roman rite)
  - Bishop Etienne-Benoît Larue, M. Afr. (1913.01.28 – 1935.10.05)
  - Bishop Alexandre-Auguste-Laurent-Marie Roy, M. Afr. (1935.10.05 – 1949.05.16)
- Vicar Apostolic of Kasama (Roman rite)
  - Bishop Marcel Daubechies, M. Afr. (1950.02.03 – 1959.04.25 see below)
- Bishops of Kasama (Roman rite)
  - Bishop Marcel Daubechies, M. Afr. (see above 1959.04.25 – 1964.11.25)
  - Bishop Clemens P. Chabukasansha (1965.07.06 – 1967.06.12 see below)
- Metropolitan Archbishops of Kasama (Roman rite)
  - Archbishop Clemens P. Chabukasansha (see above 1967.06.12 – 1973.02.22)
  - Archbishop Elias White Mutale (1973.09.17 – 1990.02.12)
  - Archbishop James Mwewa Spaita (1990.12.03 - 2009.04.30)
  - Archbishop Ignatius Chama (since 2012.01.12)

=== Coadjutor Vicar Apostolic ===
- Alexandre-Auguste-Laurent-Marie Roy, M. Afr. (1934-1935)

=== Other priest of this diocese who became bishop ===
- Justin Mulenga, appointed Bishop of Mpika in 2015
- Telesphore George Mpundu Archbishop Emeritus of Lusaka

== Suffragan dioceses ==
- Mansa
- Mpika

== See also ==
- Roman Catholicism in Zambia
- List of Roman Catholic dioceses in Zambia

== Sources ==
- catholic-hierarchy
- GCatholic.org
