= Diocese of Mouila =

Roman Catholic diocese in Gabon

Diocese of Mouila Dioecesis Muilaën(sis)

Location
- Country: Gabon
- Metropolitan: Libreville

Statistics
- Area: 59,035 km^{2} (22,794 sq mi)
- Population: Total; Catholics: (as of 2004); 115,800; 46,200 (39.9%)

Information
- Rite: Latin Rite

Current leadership
- Pope: Leo XIV
- Bishop: Mathieu Madega Lebouakehan
- Bishops emeritus: Dominique Bonnet, C.S.Sp.

The Roman Catholic Diocese of Mouila (Latin: Muilaën(sis), French: Diocèse catholique romain de Mouila) is a diocese located in the city of Mouila in the ecclesiastical province of Libreville in Gabon.

== History ==
- 11 December 1958: Established as Diocese of Mouila from the Diocese of Libreville

== Bishops of Mouila ==
- Raymond-Marie-Joseph de La Moureyre, C.S.Sp. (14 May 1959 – 28 October 1976)
- Cyriaque Siméon Obamba (28 October 1976 – 22 April 1992)
- Dominique Bonnet, C.S.Sp. (8 November 1996 – 19 January 2013)
- Mathieu Madega Lebouakehan (19 January 2013 – present); transferred from Port-Gentil

== See also ==
- Roman Catholicism in Gabon
