= Adrian Mung'andu =

Catholic archbishop of Lusaka, Zambia

- Archbishop of Lusaka
- Church: Catholic Church
- Archdiocese: Archdiocese of Lusaka
- In office: 9 January 1984 – 30 November 1996
- Predecessor: Emmanuel Milingo
- Successor: Medardo Joseph Mazombwe
- Previous post: Bishop of Livingstone (1974-1984)

Orders
- Ordination: 29 October 1950
- Consecration: 9 February 1975 by Luciano Angeloni

Personal details
- Born: c. 1923 Kasisi (northeast of Lusaka), Northern Rhodesia, British Empire
- Died: 25 June 2007 (aged 83–84)

Adrian Mung'andu (c. 1923 – 25 June 2007) was the Catholic archbishop of Lusaka between 1984 and 1996.

Mung'andu was born in Kasisi, Chongwe District, around 1923 and went to primary school there. He went to secondary school in Chikuni where he also studied to be a teacher. In 1943, he went to the seminary at Chishawasha in Zimbabwe being ordained as a priest in 1950.

During the 1950s and early 1960s, Mung'andu worked as a parish priest and as a principal of the Kasisi Boys School. He was made Vicar-General of Lusaka in 1963 before being moved to a parish in Livingstone in 1969. Pope Paul VI appointed him as Bishop of Livingstone in 1975 before Pope John Paul II promoted him in 1984.
