= Apostolic Vicariate of Makokou =

Catholic missionary jurisdiction in Gabon

The Apostolic Vicariate of Makokou (French: Vicariat apostolique de Makokou) is the last Roman Catholic missionary jurisdiction in Gabon, Equatorial Africa, as the rest of the country forms the ecclesiastical province of the Metropolitan Archbishop of Libreville. The vicariate is directly under authority of the Holy See and its Dicastery for Evangelization.

Its episcopal seat is the Cathédrale Notre-Dame des Victoires, devoted to Our Lady of Victory, in Makokou, the regional capital of the Ogooué-Ivindo province in northern Gabon.

== History ==
On 19 March 2003, it was established as the Apostolic Prefecture of Makokou, on territory split off from the Roman Catholic Diocese of Oyem.

On 11 July 2014, it was promoted to the status of an Apostolic Vicariate, which is normally led by a titular bishop.

== Ordinaries ==
Apostolic Prefect of Makokou

- Father Joseph Koerber, C.S.Sp. (19 March 2003 – 11 July 2014)

Apostolic Vicars of Makokou

- Joseph Koerber, C.S.Sp. (11 July 2014 – 6 January 2022), titular bishop of Siccenna
- Father Severin Nziengui Mangandza, C.S.Sp. (6 January 2022 – present)
