= Ignatius Chama =

Zambian Roman Catholic prelate

- Archbishop
- Church: Catholic Church
- Archdiocese: Kasama
- Appointed: 12 January 2012
- Predecessor: James Mwewa Spaita
- Successor: Incumbent

Orders
- Ordination: 12 August 1984
- Consecration: 12 January 2012 by Nicola Girasoli
- Rank: Archbishop

Personal details
- Born: Ignatius Chama; August 12, 1957 (age 68); Mutomo-Kawambwa, Mansa District, Diocese of Mansa, Zambia
- Motto: "The truth will make you free"

Styles of Ignatius Chama
- Reference style: His Grace; The Most Reverend
- Spoken style: Your Grace
- Religious style: Archbishop

Ignatius Chama (born 12 August 1957) is a Zambian Catholic prelate who is the Archbishop of the Archdiocese of Kasama. He was appointed Archbishop of Kasama on 12 January 2012 by Pope Benedict XVI.

== Background and education ==
Chama was born on 12 August 1957, in the village of Mutomo-Kawambwa, Mansa District, in the Diocese of Mansa, Zambia. He attended primary school and middle school in his home area. He completed high school at the Minor Seminary in Mansa, Zambia.

He continued with his priestly studies at Saint Augustine's Major Seminary in Mpika, Zambia, where he studied philosophy. He then transferred to Saint Dominic National Major Seminary in Lusaka, where he studied theology. He completed studies in business administration at the Nyengezi Social Training Institute (today St. Augustine University of Tanzania), in Mwanza Tanzania.

== Priesthood ==
He was ordained a priest on 12 August 1984. He served as a priest of the Diocese of Mansa until 17 July 2008.

While priest of Mansa, he served in various roles, including as:

- Assistant pastor in Kasaba from 1984 until 1985
- Vocations director for the Mansa Diocese from 1986 until 1987
- Pastor of the parish church of Kabunda and rector of St. Charles Lwanga Minor Seminary, Bahati, from 1987 until 1990
- Diocesan vice-treasurer and director of the Economic Affairs Council from 1991 until 1993
- Treasurer and director of the Economic Affairs Council from 1994 until 1997
- Bursar of St. Charles Lwanga Minor Seminary, Bahati from 1998 until 2002
- Director of the Diocesan Development Office and chaplain of the Diocesan Congregation of the Sisters of Mercy, in Mansa from 2003 until 2008.

== As bishop ==
Father Ignatius Chama was appointed Bishop of the Diocese of Mpika on 17 July 2008 and received episcopal consecration on 28 September 2008 at the hands of Archbishop Nicola Girasoli, Titular Archbishop of Egnazia Appula and Papal Nucio, assisted by Bishop George Cosmas Zumaire Lungu, Bishop of Chipata and Archbishop James Mwewa Spaita, Archbishop of Kasama.

On 12 January 2012 Pope Benedict XVI appointed Bishop Ignatius Chama as the Archbishop of the Roman Catholic Archdiocese of Kasama, in Zambia. On the same day, he was appointed as Apostolic Administrator of the Diocese of Mpika. His apostolic administration over the Diocese of Mpika ceased on 12 March 2016.

Archbishop Ignatius Chama has served as the president of the Zambian Conference of Catholic Bishops (ZCCB), for more than one three-year terms.

== See also ==
- Edwin Mwansa Mulandu
- Catholicism in Zambia

Catholic Church titles
Preceded by Telesphore George Mpundu (1987 - 2004)	Bishop of Mpika; 2008–2012	Succeeded by Justin Mulenga (2015-2020)
Preceded by James Mwewa Spaita (1990-2009)	Archbishop of Kasama; 2012–present	Succeeded by Incumbent
