= Diocese =

Christian district governed by a bishop

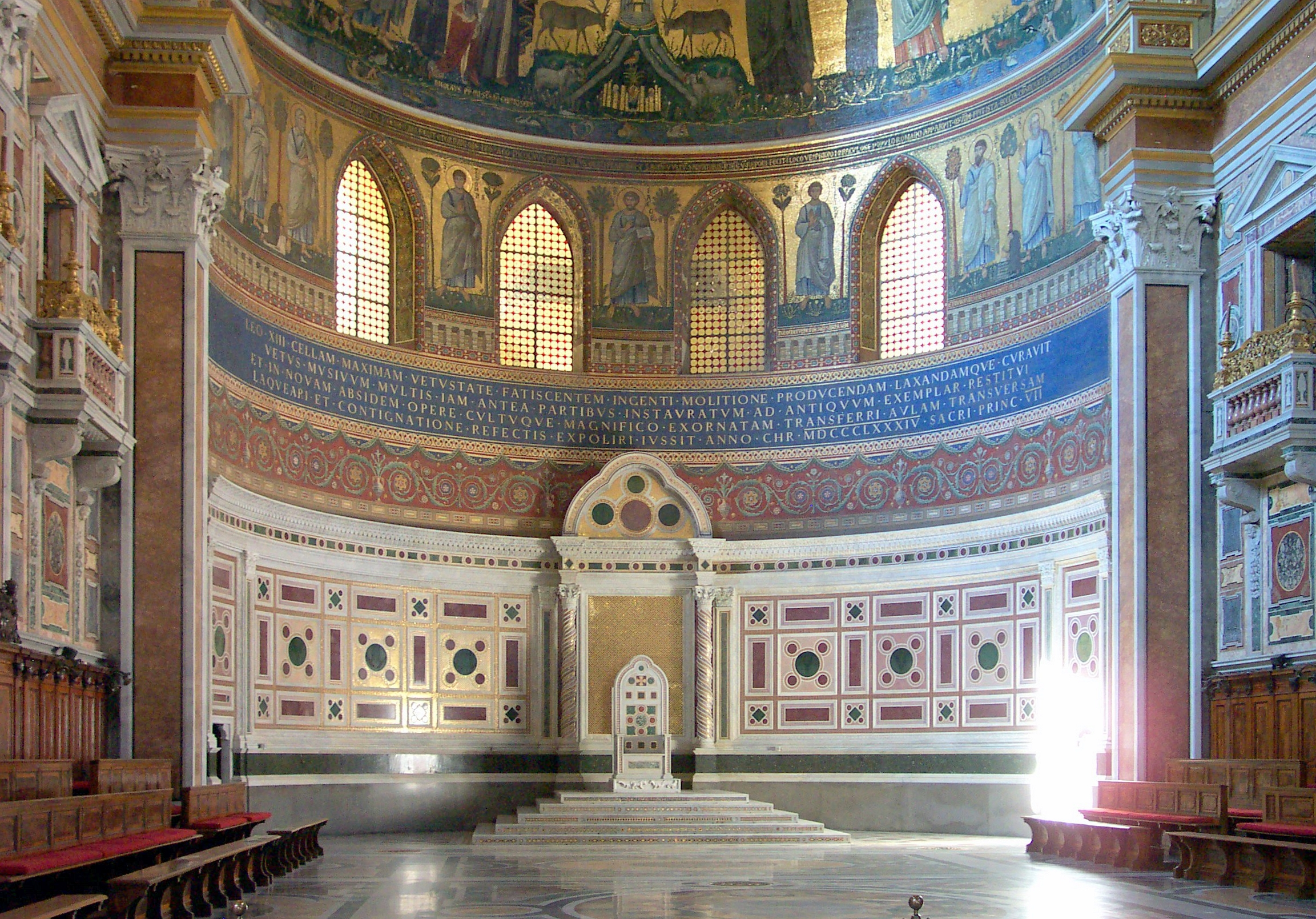
Like other dioceses, the Diocese of Rome has a cathedra, the official seat of the Bishop of Rome.

In church governance, a diocese (/ˈdaɪ.ə.sɪs/) or bishopric is the ecclesiastical district under the jurisdiction of a bishop.

== History ==
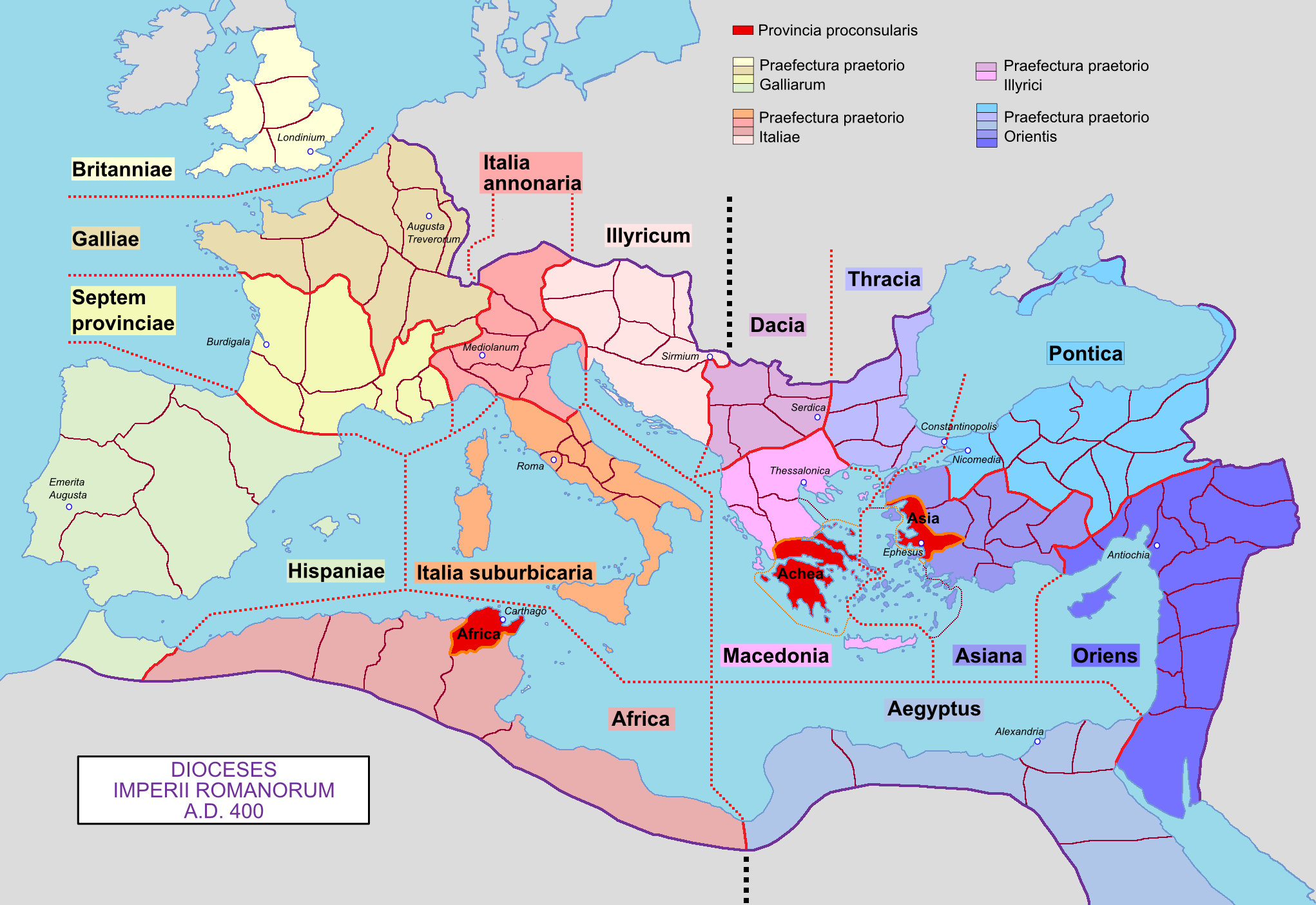
Dioceses of the Roman Empire, AD 400

In the later organization of the Roman Empire, the increasingly subdivided provinces were administratively associated in a larger unit, the diocese (Latin dioecesis, from the Greek term διοίκησις, meaning "administration").

Christianity was given legal status in 313 with the Edict of Milan. Churches began to organize themselves into dioceses based on the civil dioceses, not on the larger regional imperial districts. These dioceses were often smaller than the provinces. Christianity was declared the Empire's official religion by Theodosius I in 380. Constantine I in 318 gave litigants the right to have court cases transferred from the civil courts to the bishops. This situation must have hardly survived Julian, 361–363. Episcopal courts are not heard of again in the East until 398 and in the West in 408. The quality of these courts was low, and not above suspicion as the Bishop of Alexandria Troas found that clergy were making a corrupt profit. Nonetheless, these courts were popular as people could get quick justice without being charged fees. Bishops had no part in the civil administration until the town councils, in decline, lost much authority to a group of 'notables' made up of the richest councilors, powerful and rich persons legally exempted from serving on the councils, retired military, and bishops post-AD 450. As the Western Empire collapsed in the 5th century, bishops in Western Europe assumed a larger part of the role of the former Roman governors. A similar, though less pronounced, development occurred in the East, where the Roman administrative apparatus was largely retained by the Byzantine Empire. In modern times, many dioceses, though later subdivided, have preserved the boundaries of a long-vanished Roman administrative division. For Gaul, Bruce Eagles has observed that "it has long been an academic commonplace in France that the medieval dioceses, and their constituent pagi, were the direct territorial successors of the Roman civitates."

Modern usage of 'diocese' tends to refer to the sphere of a bishop's jurisdiction. This became commonplace during the self-conscious "classicizing" structural evolution of the Carolingian Empire in the 9th century, but this usage had itself been evolving from the much earlier parochia ("parish"; Late Latin derived from the Greek παροικία paroikia), dating from the increasingly formalized Christian authority structure in the 4th century.

== Archdiocese ==
Dioceses ruled by an archbishop are commonly referred to as archdioceses; most are metropolitan sees, being placed at the head of an ecclesiastical province. In the Catholic Church, some are suffragans of a metropolitan see or are directly subject to the Holy See.

The term "archdiocese" is not a distinct category in Catholic canon law, where the terms "diocese" and "episcopal see" apply to the territory under the ecclesiastical jurisdiction of any bishop. If the title of archbishop is granted on personal grounds to a diocesan bishop, his diocese does not thereby become an archdiocese.

== Catholic Church ==
Coat of arms of the Roman Catholic Archdiocese of Las Vegas

The Canon Law of the Catholic Church defines a diocese as "a portion of the people of God which is entrusted to a bishop for him to shepherd with the cooperation of the presbyterium, so that, adhering to its pastor and gathered by him in the Holy Spirit through the gospel and the Eucharist, it constitutes a particular church in which the one, holy, catholic, and apostolic Church of Christ is truly present and operative." "Proper determination of the boundaries" of each diocese was highlighted by the Second Vatican Council as a critical measure needed to facilitate effective pastoral care and self-understanding among "the people of God who constitute that diocese". A review of diocesan boundaries was therefore enacted by the Council.

Also known as particular churches or local churches, dioceses are under the authority of a bishop. They are described as ecclesiastical districts defined by geographical territory. Dioceses are often grouped by the Holy See into ecclesiastical provinces for greater cooperation and common action among regional dioceses. Within an ecclesiastical province, one diocese can be designated an "archdiocese" or "metropolitan archdiocese", establishing centrality within an ecclesiastical province and denoting a higher rank. Archdioceses are often chosen based on their population and historical significance. All dioceses and archdioceses, and their respective bishops or archbishops, are distinct and autonomous. An archdiocese has limited responsibilities within the same ecclesiastical province assigned to it by the Holy See.

In the Eastern Catholic Churches that are in communion with the Pope, the equivalent entity is called an eparchy or "archeparchy", with an "eparch" or "archeparch" serving as the ordinary. As of December 2024, in the Catholic Church there are 2,898 regular dioceses or eparchies, consisting of the Holy See, 9 patriarchates, 4 major archeparchies, 564 metropolitan archdioceses, 77 single archdioceses and 2,261 dioceses in the world.

The Constitution on the Sacred Liturgy, issued by the Second Vatican Council in 1963, directed that every diocese, or where appropriate a combination of dioceses, should establish a diocesan commission on the sacred liturgy, and, if possible, a commission for sacred music and a commission for sacred art, directing that they either work together in close collaboration or form a single body. Other sections or departments within a diocese include a department with oversight of Catholic education within the area. Michael Bayldon, in an article published in 1996, is critical of those dioceses whose education department is pre-occupied with schools rather than the lifelong education of the whole person, and similarly those dioceses which treat the initiation of adults into the life of the church as a liturgical rather than an educational concern.

== Eastern Orthodox Church ==
In the Eastern Orthodox Church, a diocese is also known as an eparchy (from the Greek ἐπαρχία, meaning "province"), a term used in both the Greek and Slavic traditions.

== Lutheran churches ==
Certain Lutheran denominations such as the Church of Sweden do have individual dioceses similar to Roman Catholics. These dioceses and archdioceses are under the government of a bishop (see Archbishop of Uppsala). Other Lutheran bodies and synods that have dioceses and bishops include the Church of Denmark, the Evangelical Lutheran Church of Finland, the Evangelical Church in Germany (partially), and the Church of Norway.

From about the 13th century until the German mediatization of 1803, the majority of the bishops of the Holy Roman Empire were prince-bishops, and as such exercised political authority over a principality, their so-called Hochstift, which was distinct, and usually considerably smaller than their diocese, over which they only exercised the usual authority of a bishop.

Some American Lutheran church bodies such as the Evangelical Lutheran Church in America have a bishop acting as the head of the synod, but the synod does not have dioceses and archdioceses as the churches listed above. Rather, it is divided into a middle judicatory.

The Lutheran Church - International, based in Springfield, Illinois, presently uses a traditional diocesan structure, with four dioceses in North America. Its current president is Archbishop Robert W. Hotes.

== Anglican Communion ==
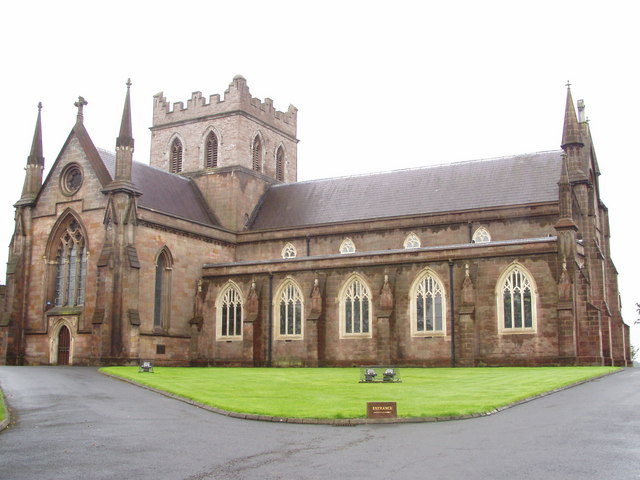
St Patrick's Cathedral, the seat of the Anglican Diocese of Armagh in the Church of Ireland

After the English Reformation, the Church of England retained the existing diocesan structure which remains throughout the Anglican Communion. The one change is that the areas administered under the Archbishop of Canterbury and Archbishop of York are properly referred to as dioceses, not archdioceses: they are the metropolitan bishops of their respective provinces and bishops of their own diocese and have the position of archbishop.

The Anglican Church in Aotearoa, New Zealand and Polynesia in its constitution uses the specific term "Episcopal Unit" for both dioceses and pīhopatanga because of its unique three-tikanga (culture) system. Pīhopatanga are the tribal-based jurisdictions of Māori pīhopa (bishops) which overlap with the "New Zealand dioceses" (i.e. the geographical jurisdictions of the pākehā (European) bishops); these function like dioceses, but are never called so.

== Pentecostalism ==
=== Church of God in Christ ===
The Church of God in Christ (COGIC) has dioceses throughout the United States. In the COGIC, most states are divided into at least three or more dioceses that are each led by a bishop (sometimes called a "state bishop"); some states have as many as ten dioceses. These dioceses are called "jurisdictions" within COGIC.

== Catharism ==
An organization created by the Gnostic group known as the Cathars in 1167 called the Council of Saint-Félix organized Cathar communities into bishoprics, which each had a bishop presiding over a specific division, even though there was no central authority.

== Churches that have bishops, but not dioceses ==
In the Free Methodist Church, Global Methodist Church, Evangelical Wesleyan Church, African Methodist Episcopal Church and United Methodist Church, a bishop is given oversight over a geographical area called an episcopal area. Each episcopal area contains one or more annual conferences, which is how the churches and clergy under the bishop's supervision are organized. Thus, the use of the term "diocese" referring to geography is the most equivalent in the United Methodist Church, whereas each annual conference is part of one episcopal area (though that area may contain more than one conference).

In the British Methodist Church and Irish Methodist Church, the closest equivalent to a diocese is the 'circuit'. Each local church belongs to a circuit, and the circuit is overseen by a superintendent minister who has pastoral charge of all the circuit churches (though in practice they delegate such charge to other presbyters who each care for a section of the circuit and chair the local church meetings as deputies of the superintendent). This echoes the practice of the early church where the bishop was supported by a bench of presbyters. Circuits are grouped together to form districts. All of these, combined with the local membership of the church, are referred to as the "connexion". This 18th-century term, endorsed by John Wesley, describes how people serving in different geographical centres are 'connected' to each other. Personal oversight of the Methodist Church is exercised by the president of the conference, a presbyter elected to serve for a year by the Methodist Conference; such oversight is shared with the vice-president, who is always a deacon or layperson. Each district is headed by a 'chair', a presbyter who oversees the district. Although the district is similar in size to a diocese, and chairs meet regularly with their partner bishops, the Methodist superintendent is closer to the bishop in function than is the chair. The purpose of the district is to resource the circuits; it has no function otherwise.

In the Church of Jesus Christ of Latter-day Saints, the term "bishopric" is used to describe the bishop together with his two counselors, not the ward or congregation of which a bishop has charge.

A diocese would be more similarly compared to a stake in the Church of Jesus Christ of Latter-day Saints, led by a stake president who, similarly to a bishopric, forms the head of a stake presidency along with two counselors that assist him.

== Churches that have neither bishops nor dioceses ==
Many churches worldwide have neither bishops nor dioceses. Most of these churches are descended from the Protestant Reformation and more specifically the Swiss Reformation led by John Calvin; these are known as the Reformed churches (which include the Continental Reformed, Presbyterian, and Congregationalist traditions).

Continental Reformed churches are ruled by assemblies of "elders" or ordained officers. This is usually called synodal government by the Continental Reformed but is essentially the same as presbyterian polity.

Presbyterian churches derive their name from the presbyterian form of church government, which is governed by representative assemblies of elders. The Church of Scotland is governed solely through presbyteries, at parish and regional level, and therefore has no dioceses or bishops.

Congregational churches practice congregationalist church governance, in which each congregation independently and autonomously runs its own affairs.

Some Methodist denominations have a congregational polity, such as the Congregational Methodist Church, while others such as the Fellowship of Independent Methodist Churches or Association of Independent Methodists are composed of independent Methodist congregations.

Most Baptists hold that no church or ecclesiastical organization has inherent authority over a Baptist church. Churches can properly relate to each other under this polity only through voluntary cooperation, never by any sort of coercion. Furthermore, this Baptist polity calls for freedom from governmental control. Most Baptists believe in "two offices of the church"—pastor-elder and deacon—based on certain scriptures (1 Timothy 3:1–13; Titus 1–2); and in Baptist doctrine, the pastor is the local, congregational bishop. Exceptions to this local form of local governance include a few churches that submit to the leadership of a body of elders, as well as the Episcopal Baptists that have an episcopal system with diocesan-equivalents.

Churches of Christ, being strictly non-denominational, are governed solely at the congregational level.

== See also ==
- Church of England § Structure
- Global organization of the Catholic Church
- Lists of patriarchs, archbishops, and bishops
- Notitia Dignitatum
- Particular church
- Personal ordinariate
- Methodist Church Ghana
- List of dioceses

== Sources and external links ==
- Complete list of Catholic dioceses worldwide by GCatholic.org
- Virtually complete list of current and historical Catholic dioceses worldwide
- Another such list, in English and Norwegian
- List of current Anglican/Episcopalian dioceses
- Indian Orthodox Church Diocese Portal
- Coats of Bishops and of Dioceses
- Ligação externa Diocese de Santo Anselmo – Brasil (archived 9 October 2011)
