= Remington =

Remington may refer to:

== Businesses ==
- Remington Arms, an American manufacturer of firearms, ammunition, and related products, 1816–2020
  - Remington Ammunition, an American brand operated by Vista Outdoor since 2021
  - Remington Firearms, an American brand operated by RemArms since 2021
  - Remington Outdoor Company, an American firearms manufacturer and holding company, 2007–2020
- E. Remington and Sons, an American manufacturer of firearms and typewriters, 1816–1896
- Remington (personal care brand), an American manufacturer of shavers and haircare products, founded 1937
- Remington College, an American chain of private schools
- Remington Rand, an American computer manufacturer, originally a typewriter manufacturer, 1927–1955
- Remington & Co, a 19th century British book publisher

== Arts and entertainment ==
- Remington (album), a 2016 album by Granger Smith
- The Remingtons, an American country music group in the early 1990s
- Remington Records, an American record label of the 1950s
- Remington and the Curse of the Zombadings, a 2011 Filipino independent horror comedy film

== People ==
- Remington (given name), including a list of people and fictional characters with the given name
- Remington (surname), including a list of people and fictional characters with the surname

== Places ==
=== United States ===
- Remington, Indiana
- Remington, Baltimore, Maryland
- Remington, Ohio
- Remington, Virginia
  - Remington Historic District
- Remington, Wisconsin
- Remington City Historic District, Bridgeport, Connecticut
- Remington Hill, California, a historic mining camp

=== Antarctica ===
- Mount Remington, in the Helliwell Hills
- Remington Glacier

== See also ==
- Rimington (disambiguation)
- Rimmington (disambiguation)
- Remy (disambiguation)
- Remi (disambiguation)
- Remington Carriage Museum, a museum in Cardston, Alberta, Canada
- Remington House (disambiguation)
- Remington Medal, an American award given in the pharmacy profession
- Remington Park, in Oklahoma City, Oklahoma, U.S.
- Remington Ranch, Texas, U .S.
- Remington Stables, in Herkimer County, New York, U.S.
