= Rémy (name) =

- Gender: Unisex
- Language: French

Origin
- Languages: Old French, Latin
- Origin: Remigius (Latin)
- Meaning: "oarsman"
- Region of origin: France

Other names
- Variant forms: Remy; Remie; Rémi; Rémie; Remi
- Related names: Remigius, Remington, Nina, Emily, Amelia, Emil, Remiyan

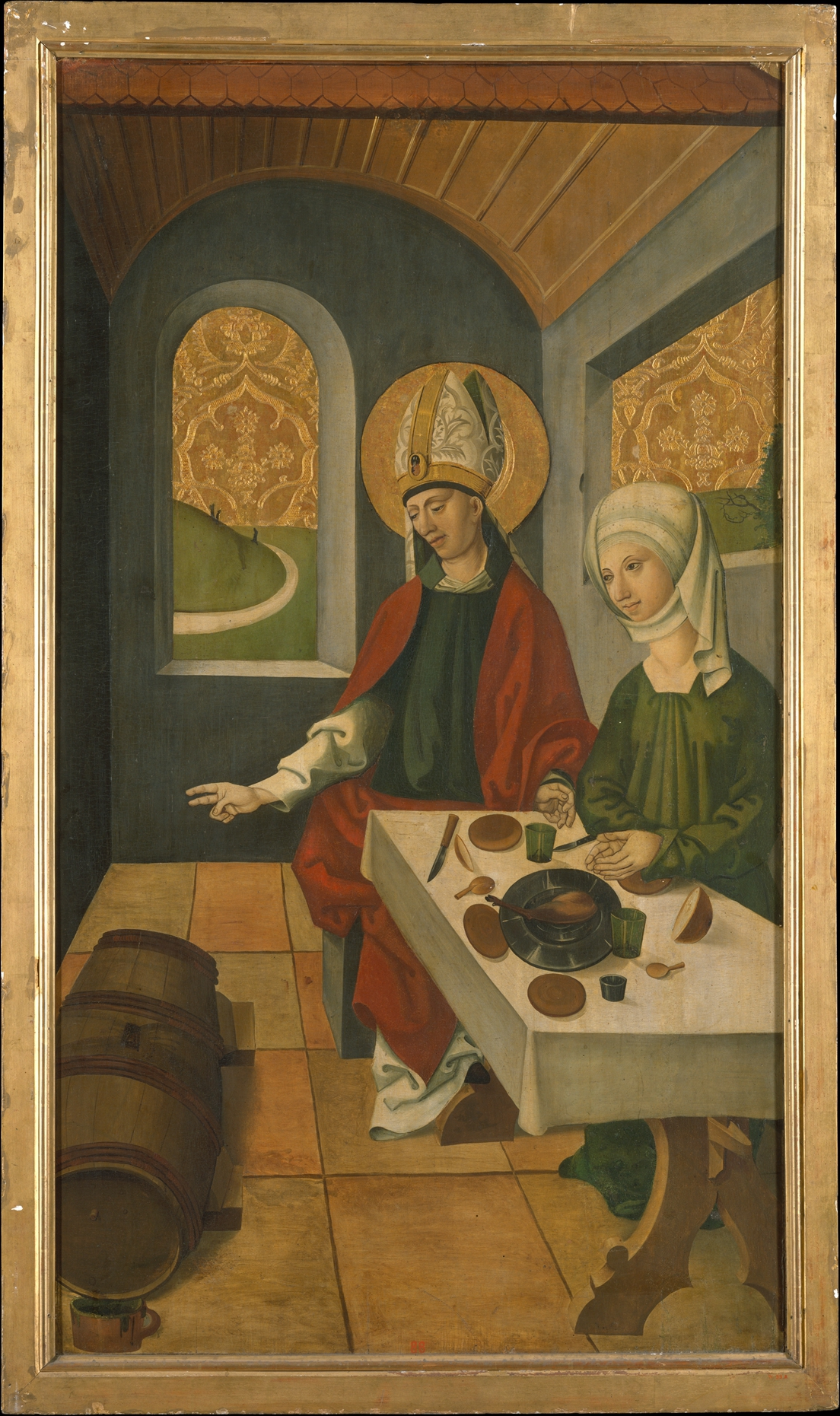
Painting of Saint Rémy c. 1500–1505

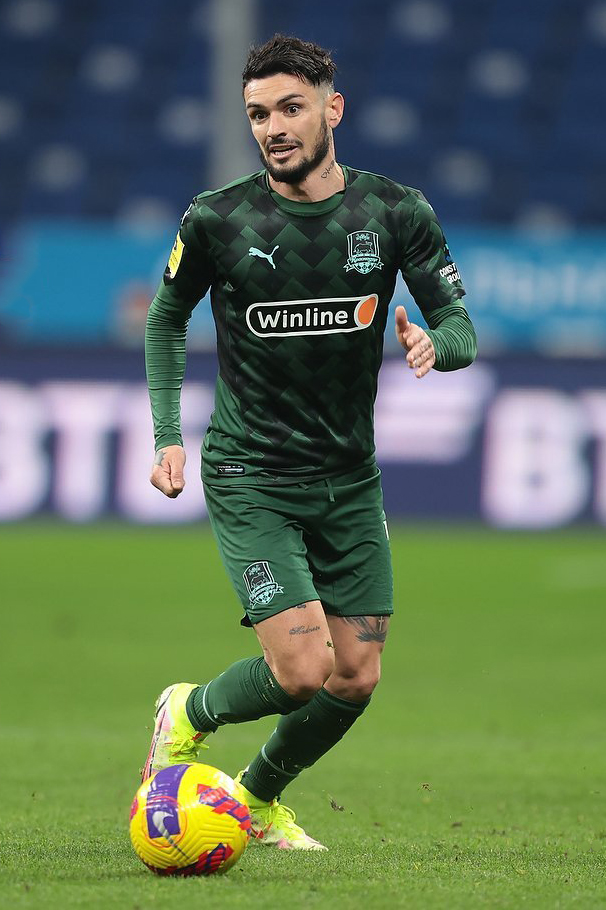
Rémy Cabella, French footballer

Rémy, Remy, Rémi, Remie, Rémie or Remi (French: [ʁemi], English: /ˈrɛmi, ˈriːmi, ˈreɪmi/) is a name of French origin meaning "oarsman", and is associated with the Latin name Remigius. It is used as either a surname or as a male or female given name.

People with the name Remy include:

== Given name ==
- Saint Rémy or Saint Remigius (437–533), male, baptised Clovis I, King of the Franks
- Achille Rémy Percheron (1797–1869), male, French entomologist
- Jean Rémy Ayouné (1914–1992), male, foreign minister of Gabon
- Jean-Rémy Badio (died 2007), male, freelance Haitian photographer and journalist
- Jean-Rémy Bessieux (1803–1876), male, Roman Catholic missionary and bishop
- Jean-Rémy Moët (1758–1841), male, French wine merchant who ran the Moët et Chandon house founded by his grandfather
- Caroline Rémy de Guebhard (1855–1929), female, French writer
- Rémy Vincent Andrianjanaka (born 1952) , male, Malagasy politician
- Rémy Belleau (1528–1577), male, French renaissance poet
- Rémy Belvaux (1966–2006), male, Belgian actor
- Remy Bonjasky (born 1976), male, Suriname-born Dutch professional K-1 kickboxer
- Rémy Boullé (born 1988), male, French paracanoeist
- Rémy Cabella (born 1990), male, French footballer
- Rémy Card, male, French Linux software developer
- Rémi Casty (born 1985), male, French rugby league footballer
- Rémy Ceillier (1688–1761), male, French Benedictine monk and historian
- Remy Charlip (1929–2012), male, American children's book author and illustrator
- Rémy Couvez, male, French hurdy-gurdy player
- Remy de Gourmont (1858–1915), male, French writer
- Rémy Descamps (born 1996), male, French football goalkeeper
- Rémy Désilets (born 1952), male, Quebec politician
- Rémy Di Gregorio (born 1985), male, French professional cyclist
- Remy Gardner (born 1998), male, Australian motorcycle racer
- Rémy Girard (born 1950), male, Quebec actor
- Remy Hamilton (born 1974), male, American football kicker
- Remy Hermoso (1947–2020), male, Venezuelan Major League Baseball shortstop
- Remy Hii (born 1986 or 1987), male, Australian actor
- Rémy Jacques (1817–1905), male, French lawyer and politician
- Remy Keo (born 1963), male, Cambodian politician
- Rémy Julienne (1930–2021), male, French stunt performer
- Remy LaCroix (1988), female, American pornographic actress
- Remy Lai, female, Singaporean-Australian children's book author
- Remy Le Boeuf, (born 1986) male, American saxophonist/composer
- Remi Lindholm (born 1998), male, Finnish cross-country skier
- Remy Ma (born 1980), female, stage name of Reminisce Smith, American female rapper
- Rémy Maertens, male, Belgian tug-of-war competitor in the 1920 Summer Olympics
- Remy Martin (basketball) (born 1998), male, American basketball player
- Rémy Martin (rugby union) (born 1979), male, French rugby union flanker
- Remy McBain (born 1991), female, Puerto Rican volleyball player
- Remy Munasifi (born 1980), male, Arab American stand-up comedian, parody musician and video artist
- Rémy Noë (born 1974), male, English painter of French-Dutch descent
- Remy Ong (born 1978), male, Singaporean bowling champion
- Rémy Pflimlin (1954–2016), male, French media executive
- Rémy Pointereau (born 1953), male, French politician
- Remy Presas (1936–2001), male, Filipino martial artist, founder of Modern Arnis
- Rémy Raffalli (1913–1952), male, French World War II soldier
- Rémy Riou (born 1987), male, French soccer goalkeeper
- Remy Ryan, female, American actress
- Rémy Scheurer (1934–2026), male, Swiss politician
- Remy Shand (born 1978), male, Canadian r&b/soul artist
- Remy Siemsen (born 1999), female, Australian footballer
- Rémy Trudel (born 1948), male, Canadian politician
- Rémy Vercoutre (born 1980), male, soccer goalkeeper
- Remy Wellen (born 1938), male, German ice hockey forward
- Remy Zaken (born 1989), female, American actress
- Rémy Zaugg (1948–2005), male, Swiss painter
- Rémy (rapper) (born 1997), male, French rapper

== Surname ==
- Alfred Remy (1870–1937), German-born American philologist and music theorist
- Danica Remy, president of B612 Foundation to protect earth from asteroids and cofounder of Asteroid Day
- Daniel de Rémy de Courcelle (1626–1698), Governor General of New France
- Donald Remy (born 1967), American attorney who served as Deputy Secretary of Veterans Affairs
- Gilles Rémy (1959), French businessman
- Jack Remy, pornographic film director
- Jacques Rémy (born 1972), French soccer striker
- Jean Rémy (1899–1955), French colonel and member of the Free French during World War II
- Jerry Remy (1952–2021), American Major League Baseball player and Boston Red Sox broadcaster
- Joseph Rémy (born 1906), Belgian boxer
- Jules Rémy (1826–1893), French naturalist and traveller
- Loïc Rémy (born 1987), French football striker
- Ludger Rémy (1949–2017), German harpsichordist, conductor, musicologist
- Nicholas Rémy (1530–1616), a French magistrate who became famous as a hunter of witches
- Patrick Rémy (skier) (born 1965), French cross-country skier
- Patrick Remy (footballer) (born 1954), French soccer striker and manager
- Paul Rémy (1923–2001), French-Algerian tennis player
- Pierre-Jean Rémy (1937–2010), French author and diplomat
- Raoul Rémy (1919–2002), French professional cyclist
- Sébastien Rémy (born 1974), Luxembourgian soccer midfielder
- Sylvain Remy (born 1980), Beninese soccer defender
- William Rémy (born 1991), French soccer defender

== Fictional characters ==
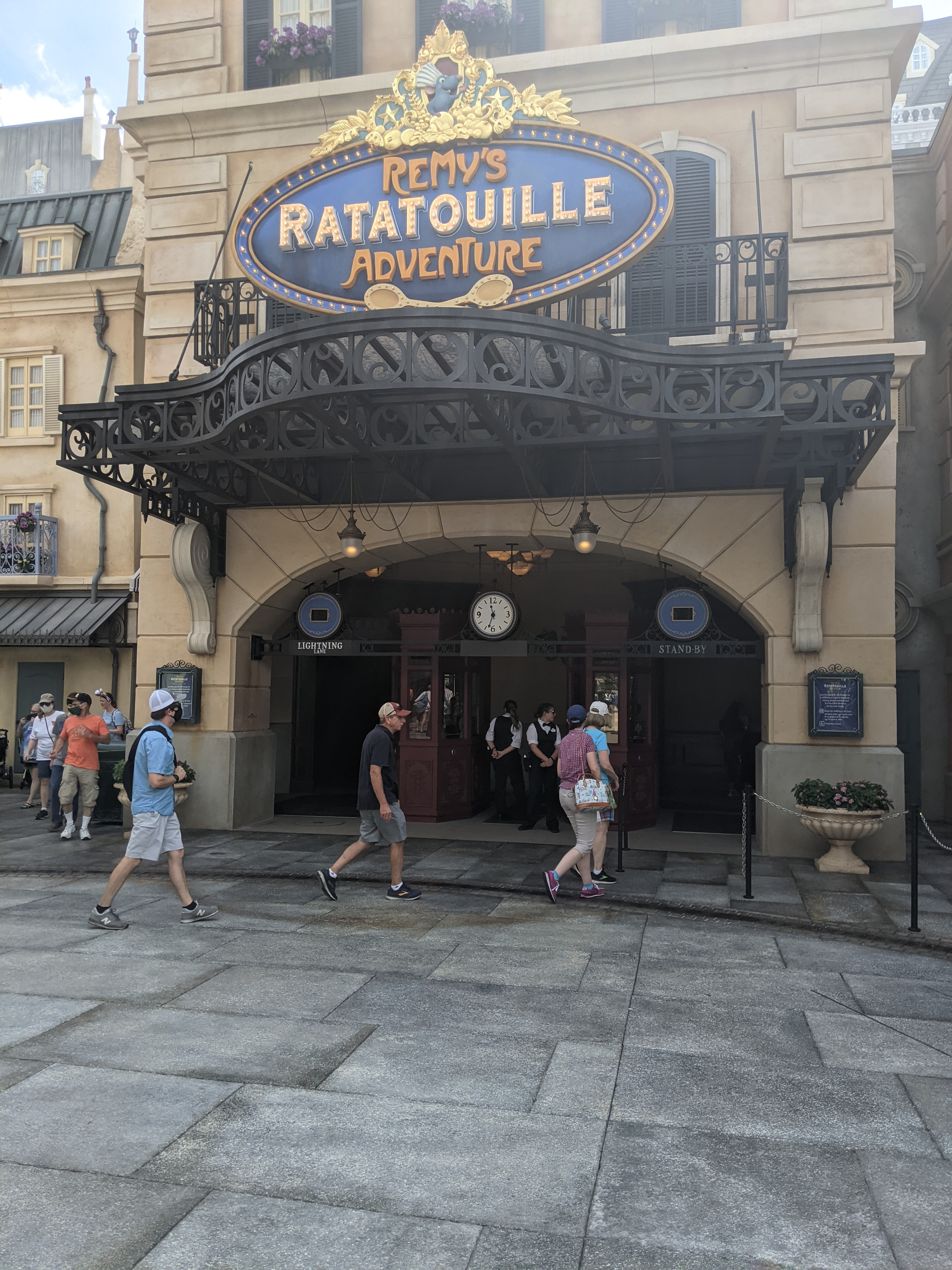
Remy's Ratatouille Adventure, based on the animated character Remy from the 2007 film Ratatouille

- Rémi the orphan boy, main male character of the popular 1878 French novel Sans Famille by Hector Malot
- Detective Lieutenant Remy McSwain, a male character played by Dennis Quaid in the 1986 film The Big Easy
- Gambit (Marvel Comics), real name Remy Étienne LeBeau, male character from X-Men comics introduced in 1990 and known for using playing cards as weapons
- Remi Hoshikawa, Five Yellow, a female character from the Japanese television series Chikyu Sentai Fiveman (1990–1991)
- Remy Baudouin, a male character in The Young Indiana Jones Chronicles (1992–1999)
- Remy, a male character in the 1995 movie Higher Learning
- Remy Marathe, a male fictional member of Les Assassins des Fauteuils Rollents, a Québécois separatist group in the 1996 novel Infinite Jest
- Remy Buxaplenty a male character from The Fairly OddParents (1998–2018)
- Remy (Street Fighter), a male video game character who practices French Boxing (savate), was introduced to the series in 1999 and voted 8th most popular character among 85 characters in the series
- Remy Starr, a female fictional character in Sarah Dessen's 5th novel This Lullaby (2002)
- Rémy Legaludec, a male character in the 2003 novel The Da Vinci Code
- Dr. Remy "Thirteen" Hadley, a female character on the television series House, M.D. (2004–2012)
- Remy (Ratatouille), a male rat chef, protagonist of Ratatouille (film) (2007) and Ratatouille the Musical (2021)
- Remy, the male landlord in the television series New Girl (2011–2018)
- Remi Delatour a male character on the television series Devious Maids (2013–2016)
- Remy Danton, a male character on the Netflix series House of Cards (2013–2018)
- Remy is a starving portrait painter who finds success and friendship in the 2014 children's storybook, Remy and Lulu by Kevin Hawkes
- Remi Briggs, also known as 'Jane Doe', a female main character played by Jamie Alexander in the NBC TV series Blindspot (2015–2020)
- Remy Bones, a male skeleton chef, in the Disney Junior television series Vampirina (2017–2021)
- Remy Remington, male character from the animated television series Big City Greens (2018 premier)
- Remy Scott, a male FBI agent character played by Dylan McDermott in FBI: Most Wanted (2019 premier)
- Remi Puguna a male character from the 2019 Japanese animated film Promare
- Remi, male character and father of Otis, in the Netflix series Sex Education (2019–2023)

== See also ==
- Remi (disambiguation)
- Remy (disambiguation)
- Gilbert Renault, French Resistance fighter and author whose aliases include Rémy and Colonel Rémy
