= List of Phi Kappa Sigma members =

Phi Kappa Sigma is an international all-male college secret society and social fraternity. It is one of the world's oldest fraternities, developing generations of members achieving notability in politics, law, business, sports, military service, and other fields. Following is a list of Phi Kappa Sigma members.

== Academia ==
- Edwin Alderman, president of the University of Virginia and the University of North Carolina at Chapel Hill
- David Prescott Barrows (Alpha Lambda, 1895), anthropologist and president of the University of California
- Derek Bok (Alpha Tau, 1951), president of Harvard University and dean of Harvard Law School
- J. M. S. Careless, chairman of the Department of History at the University of Toronto and Canadian Diplomatic Officer
- George Carver, author and professor of English at the University of Pittsburgh
- Thomas Nelson Conrad (Epsilon, 1857), third president of Virginia Tech
- John E. Corbally (Alpha Upsilon, 1947), president of the University of Illinois
- Howard Edwards, president of Rhode Island College of Agriculture and Mechanic Arts
- William B. Gates (Tau, 1900), president of the University of Pennsylvania
- Thomas F. Keller (Nu, 1954), dean of the Fuqua School of Business at Duke University
- Stanford Moore (Alpha Iota, 1935), winner of the Nobel Prize in Chemistry and professor of biochemistry at Rockefeller University
- John W. Olmsted (Alpha Lambda) history professor at University of California, Los Angeles and the first chairman of University of California, Riverside's Humanities Division
- George Adam Pfeiffer (Iota, 1910), mathematician and professor at Columbia University
- Edward Mills Purcell (Alpha Xi, 1953), winner of the Nobel Prize in Physics and researcher with Harvard University and the MIT Radiation Laboratory
- Lowel Reed (Alpha Delta, 1907), president of Johns Hopkins University
- Arthur Cutts Willard (Alpha Mu, 1904), president of the University of Illinois and an innovator in the field of heating and ventilation

== Aeronautics ==
- Roger B. Chaffee (Alpha Xi, 1957), Navy pilot; NASA astronaut; killed during Apollo 1 training exercise
- Stanley Hiller, helicopter pioneer; one of the world's three principal developers of vertical flight
- G. David Low (Alpha Alpha, 1978), NASA astronaut; Orbital Sciences Corporation executive

== Art and architecture ==
- Maxfield Parrish (Omega, 1892) artist and illustrator
- Preston Remington, art historian and curator at the Metropolitan Museum of Art

== Business ==
- Samuel Taylor Bodine (Alpha, 1873), founder and president of United Gas Improvement Company
- Adolphus A, Busch IV (Beta Gamma, 1976), CEO of Anheuser-Busch
- James A. Champy, business consultant and organizational theorist
- James Simpson Conwell (Upsilon, 1882), secretary of the United Motors Company, built the first Waverly electric pleasure car
- Robert A Cornog (Alpha Epsilon, 1961), CEO of Snap-On Tools
- Robert F. Craib Jr. (Alpha Psi, 1949), CEO of Allstate
- Will Cromarty, former CIA Officer, national security commentator, and CEO of Heathkit
- A. Felix du Pont (Alpha, 1901), director of DuPont de Nemours
- Alfred V. du Pont (Alpha, 1851), chemist and industrialist
- E. Paul du Pont (Alpha, 1909), founder of Du Pont Motors and president of Indian Motorcycles
- Francis Gurney du Pont (Alpha, 1870), vice president of E. I. du Pont de Nemours Company and inventor of smokeless gunpowder
- Henry A. du Pont (Alpha, 1857), president of the Wilmington and Northern Railroad and U.S. Senator
- Pierre S. du Pont (Alpha, 1890), director of DuPont de Nemours and CEO of General Motors
- Charles L Jarvie (Alpha Lambda), president of Dr Pepper
- Lawrence Lewis Jr., businessman, hotelier, philanthropist, and benefactor remembered for his role in founding Flagler College
- Craig Sams, co-founder of Green & Black's chocolate company
- Cyrus Wadia, CEO of Activate, previously held leadership positions at Amazon, Nike, and the White House
- Card Walker (Alpha Psi, 1938), chairman and CEO of Walt Disney Productions

== Entertainment ==
- Jorge Andres, sports anchor
- Skip Bayless (Alpha Iota, 1974), ESPN anchor and journalist
- Frederick de Cordova (Upsilon, 1931), producer of The Tonight Show Starring Johnny Carson and My Three Sons
- Matt Doherty, actor
- Dan Leal (Gamma Xi), pornographic film star and director
- Paul Lynde (Upsilon, 1948), comedian and actor; known for Hollywood Squares and Bewitched
- Jai Wolf (Delta Phi, 2013), electronic music producer

== Government ==
- John A. McCone (Alpha Lambda, 1922), director of the Central Intelligence Agency

== Law ==
- Christian Compton, justice of the Supreme Court of Virginia
- William H. Hodges, judge of the Virginia Court of Appeals and Virginia Senate
- George Boal Orlady, president judge of the Superior Court of Pennsylvania
- Lewis F. Powell Jr. (Alpha Alpha, 1929), justice of the Supreme Court of the United States

== Literature and journalism ==
- John Curley, first editor of USA Today; former head of Gannett News
- William H. Davis (Upsilon, 1943), founder and editor-in-chief of Golf Digest and senior vice president of The New York Times Company
- Dennis Overbye (Mu), science writer and cosmic affairs correspondent for The New York Times
- Robert Ruark (Lambda), novelist
- Tom Wolfe (Alpha Alpha, 1951), author and journalist, known for The Bonfire of the Vanities

== Military ==
- George H. Cameron, major general in the United States Army
- Robert E. Galer, naval aviator and brigadier general in the United States Marine Corps
- Samuel Brown Wylie Mitchell, military physician and founder of Phi Kappa Sigma
- Gordon Kidder, Royal Canadian Air Force officer
- John C. Persons, Lt. General in the United States Army
- James G. Roche (Alpha Epsilon, 1960), 20th Secretary of the Air Force
- Alfred A. Starbird, US Army brigadier general

== Politics ==
- Dalton Bales, Canadian politician
- Allen J. Bloomfield, New York State Assembly and New York State Senate
- Philip L. Cannon, first Lieutenant Governor of Delaware
- Owen Cleary, Michigan Secretary of State and chair of the Michigan Republican Party
- Dow Constantine, Washington House of Representatives and Washington Senate
- Henry A. du Pont, U.S. Senator from Delaware and president of the Wilmington and Northern Railroad
- Garland Gray, Virginia Senate
- William H. Hodges, Virginia Senate and judge of the Virginia Court of Appeals
- Arthur B. Langlie, 12th and 14th governor of Washington
- Thomas S. Martin, United States Senator and Chairman of the Senate Democratic Caucus
- David Nolan (Alpha Mu, 1965), founder of the US Libertarian Party
- Fred Quayle, Virginia Senate
- Bob Riley (Alpha Kappa, 1965), Governor of Alabama
- Richard Schweiker, U.S. Secretary of Health and Human Services, U.S. House of Representatives, and U.S. Senate
- Claude A. Swanson, Governor of Virginia, U.S. Senate, U.S. House of Representatives, and U.S. Secretary of the Navy
- C. Harding Walker, president pro tempore of the Senate of Virginia.

== Religion ==
- Frank Milton Bristol, Bishop of the Methodist Episcopal Church
- James de Wolf Perry, Episcopal Bishop of Rhode Island and Presiding Bishop of the Episcopal Church
- Ernest Gladstone Richardson, Methodist Episcopal Church Bishop of New Jersey

== Sports ==
- Bert Bell (Alpha, 1918), commissioner of the National Football League
- Denny Crum (Alpha Psi, 1960) head basketball coach at the University of Louisville
- Ward Edmonds, NCAA pole vault champion in 1928 and 1929
- Johnny Gee, professional baseball and basketball player
- Pop Golden, head football coach at Pennsylvania State University
- Frank McGuire (Eta, 1966) head basketball coach at the University of South Carolina
- Gary Moeller (Alpha Chi, 1963), head football coach of the University of Michigan
- Scott A. Muller, Olympic canoeist in 1996
- Jeff Mullins (Nu, 1964), professional basketball player and head basketball coach of the University of North Carolina at Charlotte
- Biggie Munn (Alpha Sigma, 1932), head football coach of the Michigan State University
- B. L. Noojin, Minor League Baseball player and athletic director at Howard College and at the University of Alabama
- W. C. Raftery, head football coach at Virginia Military Institute
- Al Scates, volleyball player and head coach of the UCLA Bruins for 48 years
- W. Rice Warren, head football coach at Randolph–Macon College, the University of Virginia, and the University of South Carolina
- Steven Zierk, 2010 World Under 18 Chess Champion
