= Romeyn =

Given name and surname

Romeyn (pronounced [roːˈmɛin]) is a Dutch given name and surname. Among variant forms are Romeijn, Romein, Romijn and Romyn, all pronounced the same. Romein means "Roman", and the given name could be considered cognate to Romeo. The surname's origin may thus be patronymic or toponymic, indicating someone from Rome. Sometimes the name is a spelling change from Remein, which started as a patronymic based on the given name Remy / Remigius. Notable people with the name include:

== Given name ==
- Romeyn B. Ayres (1825–1888), Union Army general in the American Civil War
- Romeyn Berry (1881–1957), American sports administrator and author
- Romeyn de Hooghe (1645–1708), Dutch painter, sculptor, engraver and caricaturist
- Romeyn Beck Hough (1857–1924), American physician and botanist best known for creating The American Woods

As a middle name

- Theodric Romeyn Beck (1791–1855), American physician specializing in medical jurisprudence
- John Romeyn Brodhead (1814–1873), American historical scholar
- Charles Romeyn Dake (1849–1899), American homeopathic physician and writer
- Elizabeth Romeyn Elwyn (1922–2002), American-born architect
- Ned Romeyn Healy (1905–1977), member of Congress from 1945 to 1947
- Theodoric Romeyn Westbrook (1821–1885), U.S. Representative from New York

== Surname ==
- Annie Romein-Verschoor (1895–1978), Dutch author and historian, wife of Jan
- Charles Romeyn (1874–1950), American football player and United States Army officer
- Charles W. Romeyn (died 1942), American architect
- Henk Romijn Meijer (1929–2008), Dutch linguist and author
- Hennie de Romijn (born 1968), Dutch football defender
- Henry Romeyn (1833–1913), American Army officer and Medal of Honor recipient
- Jan Romein (1893–1962), Dutch historian, journalist and literary scholar, husband of Annie
- John le Romeyn (died 1296), mediaeval Archbishop of York
- Luke Romyn (born 1975), Australian action thriller author
- Piet Romeijn (born 1939), Dutch football defender
- Rebecca Romijn (born 1972), American actress and model
- Willem Romeyn (1624–1693), Dutch landscape painter

== See also ==
- Romen (disambiguation)
