= Remi (disambiguation) =

The Remi were an ancient Belgic tribe.

Remi or Rémi may also refer to:

== People ==
=== Given name ===
- Saint Remigius (437–533), male saint often called "Saint Remi"
- Rémi (died 2023), Malagasy politician
- Remi Abiola (1952–2009), Nigerian film actress
- Remi Adedeji (born 1937), Nigerian writer for children
- Remi Adefarasin (born 1948), English cinematographer
- Rémi Adiko (born 1982), Ivorian footballer
- Aimol Reamsochung (born 2000), nickname Remi, Indian footballer
- Remi Allen (born 1990), English football midfielder
- Remi Álvarez, Mexican jazz saxophonist
- Remi Anri Doi (born 1989), also called Rémi Feutrier, French-born Japanese handball player
- Remi Aubuchon, American television writer and producer
- Remi Ayodele (born 1983), American football player
- Remi Babalola, banker and former minister
- Rémi Babinet (born 1957), French creative director
- Rémi Bakou, Congolese politician
- Remi Barclay Messenger (born 1946), founding member of three prominent professional theatre companies
- Rémi Barry (born 1991), French professional basketball player
- Rémi Benoît (1842–1919), man of a number of vocations from D'Escousse, Nova Scotia
- Rémi Berthet (born 1947), French judoka
- Rémi Bezançon (born 1971), French director and screenwriter
- Rémi Biancardini (born 1992), French professional footballer
- Rémi Bonfils (born 1988), French rugby union player
- Rémi Bonnet (born 1995), Swiss male ski mountaineer, mountain runner and sky runner,
- Rémi Bouchard (1936–2019), Canadian composer and educator
- Rémi Boutillier (born 1990), French tennis player
- Rémi Brague (born 1947), French historian of philosophy
- Remi Broadway (born 1978), Australian actor
- Rémi Bujold (born 1944), Canadian lawyer and former politician
- Rémi Casty (born 1985), French rugby league footballer
- Rémi Cavagna (born 1995), French cyclist
- Rémi Cilia (born 1989), French football player
- Rémi Coulom (born 1974), French computer scientist
- Rémi Cusin (born 1986), French professional road racing cyclist
- Remi Dada (born 1986), Nigerian architect and entrepreneur
- Remi De Roo (1924–2022), Canadian bishop of the Catholic Church
- Rémi Delatte (born 1956), French politician
- Rémi Desbonnet (born 1992), French handballer
- Rémi Després (born 1943), French engineer and entrepreneur
- Rémi Di Girolamo (born 1982), French rower
- Remi Drieux (1519–1594), first bishop of Leeuwarden
- Rémi Drolet (born 2000), Canadian cross-country skier
- Remi Dujardin (born 1997), Hong Kong professional footballer
- Remi El-Ouazzane (born 1973), French businessman
- Remi Elie (born 1995), Canadian professional ice hockey forward
- Remi Eriksen (born 1967), current group president and chief executive officer of DNV
- Remi Fani-Kayode (1921–1955), leading Nigerian politician, aristocrat, nationalist, statesman and lawyer
- Rémi Feuillet (born 1992), Mauritian judoka
- Rémi Fournier (born 1983), French professional footballer
- Rémi Fraisse (1993–2014), French botanist involved in nature conservation
- Rémi Gaillard (born 1975), French prankster, YouTuber and animal rights activist
- Rémi Garde (born 1966), French professional footballer
- Rémi Garrigue (born 2004), French fencer
- Rémi Garsau (born 1984), water polo player from France
- Rémi Gaulin (1787–1857), Roman Catholic priest and bishop
- Rémi Gomis (born 1984), French footballer for Senegal
- Remi Hereide (born 1973), Norwegian speed skater
- Remi Hereide (born 1973), Norwegian speed skater
- Rémi Himbert (born 2008), French footballer
- Remi Hirano (born 1947), female Japanese chef and TV personality
- Rémi Ingres (born 1969), French short track speed skater
- Rémi Jegaan Dioh, Senegalese singer, author, composer and guitarist
- Remi Johansen (born 1990), Norwegian footballer
- Remi Kabaka (born 1945), Nigerian Afro-rock avant-garde drummer
- Remi Kabaka Jr. (born 1970), British record producer, art director, and percussionist
- Remi Kanazi (born 1981), Palestinian-American performance poet, writer
- Remi Korchemny (born 1932), American sprint coach
- Remi Koyama (born 2000), Japanese ice hockey player
- Rémi Lamerat (born 1990), French rugby union player
- Rémi Lange (born 1969), French film director
- Rémi Laurent (1957–1989), French actor
- Remi Lindholm (born 1998), male, Finnish cross-country skier
- Remi Matthews (born 1994), English professional footballer
- Rémi Marcoux (born 1940), founder and controlling shareholder of Transcontinental, Inc
- Rémi Maréval (born 1983), Martiniquais professional footballer
- Rémi Massé, Canadian politician
- Rémi Mathis (born 1982), French historian and curator
- Remi Matsuo (born 1991), female Japanese musician
- Remi Moreno Flores (born 1988), French sport shooter
- Remi Moses (1960–2025), English footballer
- Rémi Mulumba (born 1992), French-born footballer
- Remi Nadeau (1920–2016), American historian
- Remi Nicole (born 1983), British singer-songwriter and actress
- Rémi Ochlik (1983–2012), British singer-songwriter and actress
- Rémi Paul (1921–1982), Canadian lawyer and politician
- Rémi Pauriol (born 1982), French professional road bicycle racer
- Rémi Pelletier-Roy (born 1990), Canadian track and road cyclist
- Rémi Pété (born 1987), French male canoeist
- Rémi Pillot (born 1990), French professional footballer
- Remi Poppe (born 1938), Dutch politician and environmental activist
- Remi Prieur (born 1997), Austrian footballer
- Remi Prudhomme (1942–1990), American football offensive lineman
- Rémi Quirion (born 1955), Canadian scientist
- Remi Rabenirina (born 1938), Malagasy Anglican archbishop
- Remi Raji (born 1961), Nigerian poet, writing in English
- Rémi Raymond (1811–1891), businessman, farmer and political figure in Quebec
- Rémi Rossi (born 1995), Tahitian badminton player
- Remi Rough (fl. 1980s–2008), male English street artist
- Rémi Royer (born 1978), Canadian professional ice hockey defenceman
- Rémi Santiago (born 1980), French ski jumper
- Rémi Saudadier (born 1986), water polo player from France
- Rémi Schelcher (1905–1988), French sailor
- Rémi Sergio (born 1987), French professional footballer
- Rémi Siméon (1827–1890), French lexicographer
- Remi Sølvberg (born 1976), Norwegian politician
- Remi Sonaiya (born 1955), Nigerian politician, educationalist and writer
- Rémi Souyeux (born 1984), French professional footballer
- Rémi Talès (born 1984), French rugby union player
- Remi Tezuka (born 1980), Japanese tennis player
- Remi Tinubu (born 1960), Nigerian politician and current first lady of Nigeria
- Remi Tsuruta (born 1997), Japanese athlete
- Remi Van Vreckom (1943–2000), Belgian racing cyclist
- Remi Vaughan-Richards, Nigerian filmmaker
- Remi Vermeiren (born 1940), Belgian banker and businessman
- Remi Verschaetse (1903-????), Belgian racing cyclist
- Rémi Walter (born 1995), French professional footballer
- Remi Wolf (born 1996), female American musician
- Remi Yamamoto, senior advisor for communications to the White House Chief of Staff

=== Other names ===
- Georges Prosper Remi (1907–1983), Belgian comic book writer and artist
- M. Remi Yergeau (born 1984), American academic in the fields of rhetoric and writing studies, digital studies, queer rhetoric, disability studies, and theories of mind
- Remilia (1995–2019), American professional gamer also known by the in-game name "Remi"
- José Vega Santana (born 1958), Puerto Rican clown known by the stage name "Remi"

== Arts and entertainment ==
=== Fictional characters ===
- Remi Otogiri, from Groove On Fight in the Power Instinct series
- Rémi (Sans Famille), the title character in Hector Malot's 19th-century novel Sans Famille
  - Remi, the protagonist of anime adaptations of the French novel Sans Famille
- Remilia Scarlet, a.k.a. Remi, from the video game Touhou Project

=== Film and television ===
- Remi, Nobody's Boy, a 2018 French historical comedy-drama film
- Remi, Nobody's Girl, a 26-episode Japanese anime television series

=== Other uses in arts and entertainment ===
- Remi (band), an Australian hip hop duo
- Remi (award), an award from the WorldFest-Houston International Film Festival

== Science and technology ==
- Refraction microtremor, sometimes abbreviated ReMi
- Restriction enzyme mediated integration, a technique for integrating DNA
- REMI (remote integration model), a set of tools and practices in broadcast engineering to produce live events remotely without sending personnel on site

== Places in Canada ==
- Remi Lake, in the municipality of Moonbeam and Gurney Township, Ontario
- Remi River, Ontario

== Other uses ==
- Rem (mythology), an Egyptian god sometimes called Remi
- Rémi, the brand used by public transport services offered by the French region of Centre-Val de Loire, including TER Centre-Val de Loire

== See also ==
- Remy (disambiguation)
- Rémy (name)
