= Turtle Island =

Indigenous American name for Earth or North America

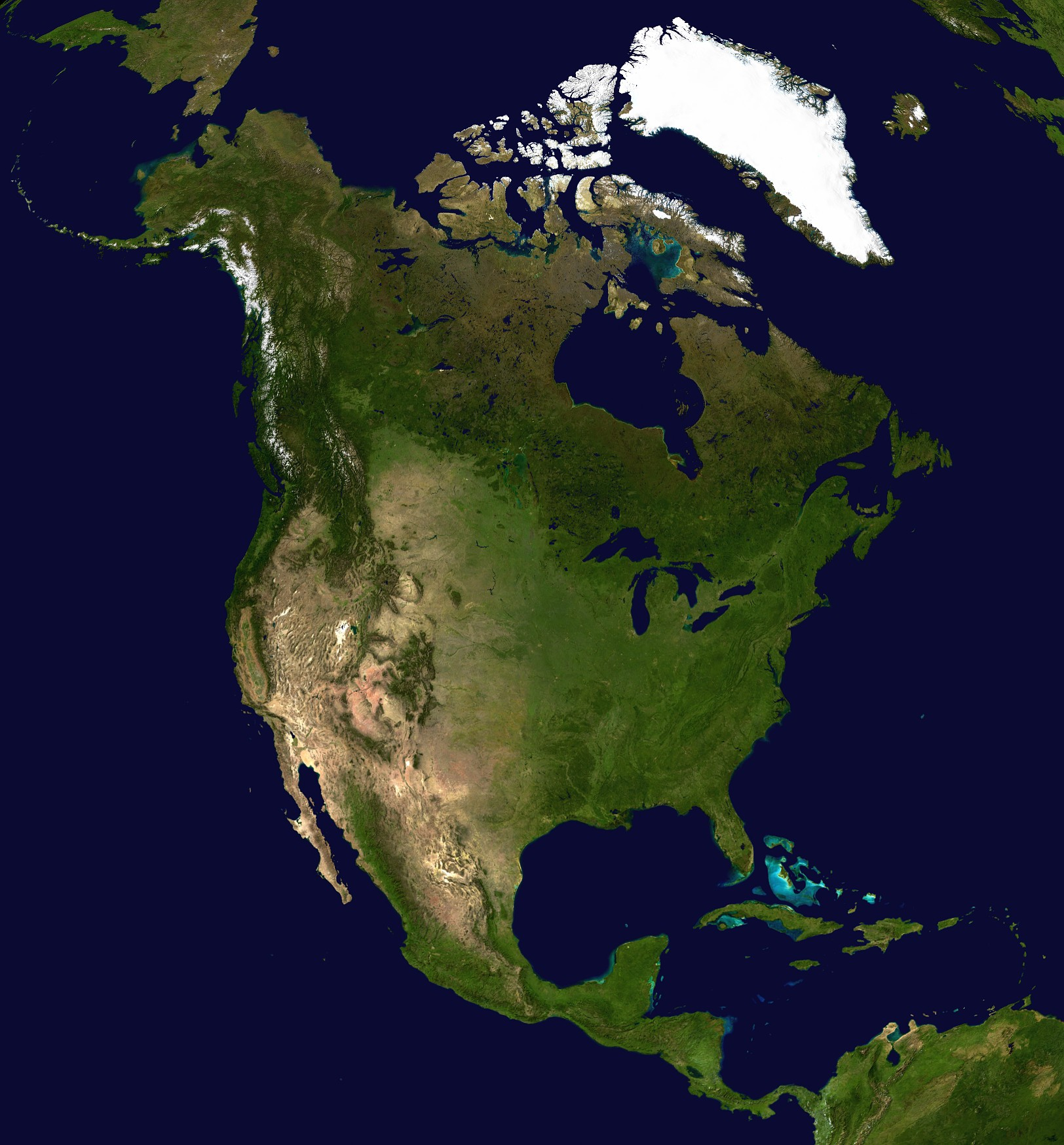
Satellite imagery of Turtle Island (North America)

"Turtle Island" is a name used by some Indigenous peoples of the Americas to refer to Earth or North America. It is also commonly used among both Indigenous and non-Indigenous activists for Indigenous rights. The name is based on an oral history once common to the Indigenous peoples of the Northeastern Woodlands, which today roughly encompasses southeastern Canada and the northeastern United States.

A number of contemporary works continue to use and/or tell the Turtle Island creation story.

== Lenape ==
The Lenape story of the "Great Turtle" was first recorded by European colonists from an interview on October 16, 1679, in the 1679–80 journal of the Labadist missionary Jasper Danckaerts. It was explained to the missionary by the Hackensack elder Tantaqué, who was then visiting the Fort James area in Lower Manhattan. The story is shared by other Northeastern Woodlands tribes, notably the Haudenosaunee peoples.

The Lenape believe that before creation there was nothing, an empty dark space. However, in this emptiness, there existed a spirit of their creator, Kishelamàkânk. Eventually in that emptiness, he fell asleep. While he slept, he dreamt of the world as we know it today, the Earth with mountains, forests, and animals. He also dreamt up man, and he saw the ceremonies man would perform. Then he woke up from his dream to the same nothingness he was living in before. Kishelamàkânk then started to create the Earth as he had dreamt it.

First, he created helper spirits, the Grandfathers of the North, East, and West, and the Grandmother of the South. Together, they created the Earth just as Kishelamàkânk had dreamt it. One of their final acts was creating a special tree. From the roots of this tree came the first man, and when the tree bent down and kissed the ground, woman sprang from it.

All the animals and humans did their jobs on the Earth, until a problem eventually arose. There was a tooth of a giant bear that could give the owner magical powers, and the humans started to fight over it. Eventually, the wars got so bad that people moved away, and made new tribes and new languages. Kishelamàkânk saw this fighting and decided to send down a spirit, Nanabush, to bring everyone back together. He went on top of a mountain and started the first Sacred Fire, which gave off a smoke that caused all the people of the world to come investigate what it was. When they all came, Nanabush created a pipe with a sumac branch and a soapstone bowl, and the creator gave him Tobacco to smoke with. Nanabush then told the people that whenever they fought with each other, to sit down and smoke tobacco in the pipe, and they would make decisions that were good for everyone.

The same bear tooth later caused a fight between two evil spirits, a giant toad and an evil snake. The toad was in charge of all the waters, and amidst the fighting he ate the tooth and the snake. The snake then proceeded to bite his side, releasing a great flood upon the Earth. Nanabush saw this destruction and began climbing a mountain to avoid the flood, all the while grabbing animals that he saw and sticking them in his sash. At the top of the mountain there was a cedar tree that he started to climb, and as he climbed he broke off limbs of the tree. When he got to the top of the tree, he pulled out his bow, played it and sang a song that made the waters stop. Nanabush then asked which animal he could put the rest of the animals on top of in the water. The turtle volunteered saying he'd float and they could all stay on him, and that's why they call the land Turtle Island.

Nanabush then decided the turtle needed to be bigger for everyone to live on, so he asked the animals if one of them would dive down into the water to get some of the old Earth. The beaver tried first, but came up dead and Nanabush had to revive him. The loon tried second, but its attempt ended with the same fate. Lastly, the muskrat tried. He stayed down the longest, and came up dead as well, but he had some Earth on his nose that Nanabush put on the Turtle's back. Because of his accomplishment, Nanabush told the muskrat he was blessed and his kind would always thrive in the land.

Nanabush then took out his bow and again sang, and the turtle started to grow. It kept growing, and Nanabush sent out animals to try to get to the edge to see how long it had grown. First, he sent the bear, and the bear returned in two days saying he had reached the end. Next, he sent out the deer, who came back in two weeks saying he had reached the end. Finally, he sent the wolf, and the wolf never returned because the land had gotten so big. Lenape tradition said wolves howl to call their ancestor back home.

== Haudenosaunee ==
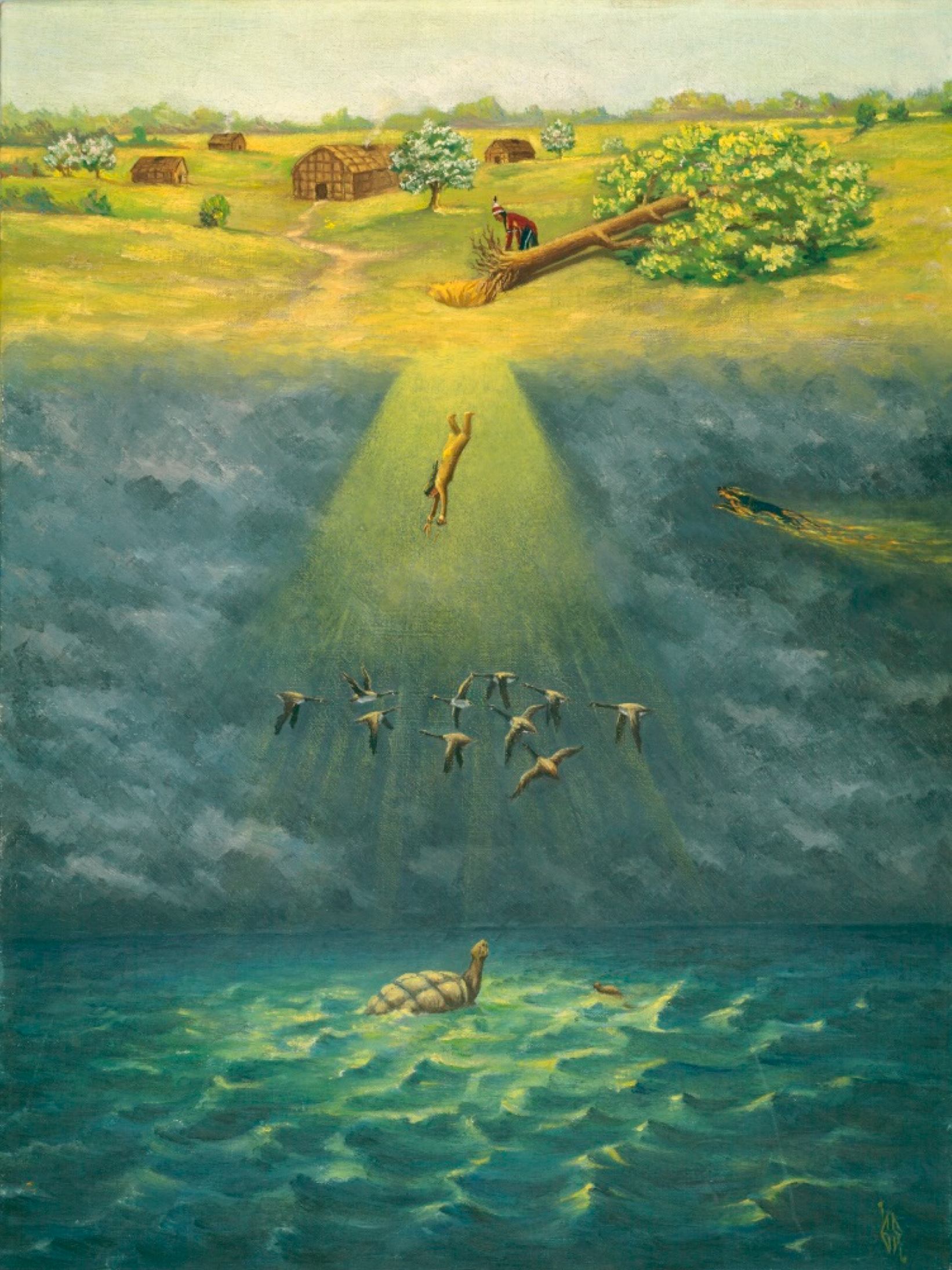
Sky Woman (1936), by Seneca artist Ernest Smith, depicts the story of Turtle Island.

According to the oral tradition of the Haudenosaunee, "the earth was the thought of [a ruler of] a great island which floats in space [and] is a place of eternal peace." Sky Woman fell down to the earth when it was covered with water, or more specifically, when there was a "great cloud sea". Various animals tried to swim to the bottom of the ocean to bring back dirt to create land. Muskrat succeeded in gathering dirt, which was placed on the back of a turtle. This dirt began to multiply and also caused the turtle to grow bigger. The turtle continued to grow bigger and bigger and the dirt continued to multiply until it became a huge expanse of land. Thus, when Haudenosaunee cultures refer to the earth, they often call it Turtle Island.

According to Converse and Parker, the Haudenosaunee faith shared with other religions the "belief that the Earth is supported by a gigantic turtle." In the Seneca language, the mythical turtle is called Hah-nu-nah, while the name for an everyday turtle is ha'no:wa:h.

In Susan M. Hill's version of the story, the muskrat or other animals die in their search for land for the Sky Woman (named Mature Flower in Hills's version). This is a representation of the Haudenosaunee beliefs of death and chaos as forces of creation, as all people give their bodies to the land to become soil, which in turn continues to support life. This concept plays out again when Mature Flower's daughter dies during childbirth, becoming the first person to be buried on the turtle's back and whose burial post helped grow various plants such as corn and strawberries. This, according to Hill, also shows how soil, and the land itself, has the ability to act and shape creation. Some versions of this myth do not include this expanded edition as part of the creation story, however, these differences are important to note when considering Haudenosaunee traditions and relationships.

== Indigenous rights activism and environmentalism ==
The name Turtle Island has been used by many Indigenous cultures in North America, and both American Indian and non-American Indian activists, especially since the 1970s when the term came into wider usage. American author and ecologist Gary Snyder uses the term to refer to North America, writing that it synthesizes both indigenous and colonizer cultures, by translating the indigenous name into the colonizer's languages (the Spanish Isla Tortuga being proposed as a name as well). Snyder argues that understanding North America under the name of Turtle Island will help shift conceptions of the continent. Turtle Island has been used by writers and musicians, including Snyder for his Pulitzer Prize-winning book of poetry, Turtle Island; the Turtle Island Quartet jazz string quartet; Tofurky manufacturer Turtle Island Foods; and the Turtle Island Research Cooperative in Boise, Idaho.

The Canadian Association of University Teachers has put into practice the acknowledgment of indigenous territory and claims, particularly at institutions located within unceded land or covered by perpetual decrees such as the Haldimand Tract. At Canadian universities, many courses, student and academic meetings, as well as convocation and other celebrations begin with a spoken acknowledgement of the traditional Indigenous territories, sometimes including reference to Turtle Island, in which they are taking place.

== Contemporary works ==
There are a number of contemporary works which continue to use and/or tell the story of the Turtle Island creation story.

=== The Truth About Stories by Thomas King ===
Thomas King's book tells us that "the truth about stories is they're all we are." King's book explores the power of story both in native lives and in the lives of every person on this planet. Every chapter opens with a telling of the story of the world on the back of a turtle in space, and in each chapter, it is slightly altered to show how stories change through tellers and audiences. Their fluidity is itself a characteristic of the story as they traverse through time.

King provides us with his own telling of the story using a woman named Charm as his Sky Woman. Charm is from a different planet and is described as being curious to a fault, often asking the animals of her planet questions they deem to be too nosy. When she becomes pregnant, she develops a craving for Red Fern Root, which can only be found underneath the oldest tree. While digging for the Red Fern Root she digs so deep she makes a hole in the planet, and in her curiosity falls through all the way to earth. King tells us that this is a young Earth from before land was created, and in order to save Charm from falling hard and fast into the water and upsetting the stillness of the water, all the water birds fly up to catch her. With no land to set her on they offer her the back of the turtle. When Charm is almost ready to give birth the animals fear that the turtle will be too crowded, so she asks the animals to dive down to find mud so that she can use its magic to build dry land. Many animals try but most fail, until the otter dives down for days before finally surfacing, passed out from exhaustion, clutching mud in its paws. Charm creates land from the mud, magic, and the turtle's back and gives birth to twins which keep the earth in balance. One twin flattened out the land, created light, and created woman, while the other made valleys and mountains, shadows, and man.

King emphasizes that the Turtle Island creation story creates "a world in which creation is a shared activity...a world that begins in chaos and moves toward harmony." He explains that understanding and continuing to tell this story creates a world that values these ideas and relationships with nature. Without that understanding, we fail to uphold the relationships forged by Charm, the twins, and the animals that created the earth.

=== Braiding Sweetgrass by Robin Wall Kimmerer ===
Robin Wall Kimmerer's book Braiding Sweetgrass addresses the need for us to understand our reciprocal relationships with nature in order for us to understand and use our role as keystone species within our ecologies as a means to heal the earth. The version of the story from Kimmerer starts off with the Sky Woman falling from a hole in the sky, cradling something tightly in her hands. Geese rise up to soften her landing and place her on the back of a turtle so that she does not drown. All the animals congregate to help find dirt for the sky woman so that she can build her habitat, some giving their lives in the search. Finally, the muskrat surfaces, dead but clutching a handful of soil for the Sky Woman, who takes the offering gratefully and uses seeds from The Tree of Life to begin her garden using her gratitude and the gifts from the animals, thus creating Turtle Island as we know it. Through the Sky Woman story, Kimmerer tells us that we cannot "begin to move toward ecological and cultural sustainability if we cannot even imagine what the path feels like."

=== Cherokee Stories of the Turtle Island Liars' Club by Christopher B. Teuton ===
Christopher B. Teuton book provides a comprehensive look into Cherokee oral traditions and art to bring them into the contemporary moment. He put together his collection with three friends, also master storytellers, who get together to swap stories from around the 14 Cherokee states. The first chapter of the book Beginnings starts with a telling of the Sky Woman story. Notably, this telling of Turtle Island has the water beetle dive for the earth necessary for the sky woman, where often you will see a muskrat or otter. Turtle Island is a running theme throughout the book, as it is the beginning of life and story.

=== We Are Water Protectors by Carole Lindstrom ===
We Are Water Protectors is a children's storybook written by Carole Lindstrom in 2020 in response to the building of the Dakota Access Pipeline, represented as a large black snake in the book. The book says that water is the source of all life, and it is all our duty to protect our water sources so that we can preserve not only ourselves but those of animals and the environment. The story draws important meanings from the Turtle Island creation story such as water as the origin of life and closes with a drawing of the main character returning the turtle to the water saying "We are stewards of the earth. Our spirits are not to be broken."

== See also ==
- Geographical renaming – the practice of political renaming
- Abya Yala – a similar name used by the Guna people and others to refer to the Americas as a whole
- Aotearoa – the Māori name for New Zealand
- Aztlán – the legendary ancestral home of the Aztec peoples
- Anahuac – Nahuatl name for the historical and cultural region of Mexico
- Cemanahuac – Nahuatl name used by the Mexica to refer to the larger region beyond their empire, between the Pacific and Atlantic Ocean
- Turtles in North American Indigenous Mythology
- World Turtle
- Discworld
- Usonia (name) - Alternative name for 'The United States'
