= Romey =

Romey is a surname. Notable people with the surname include:

- Ayse Romey, American-born German actress
- Dick Romey (1905–1980), American football player
- Raphaël Romey (born 1981), French footballer

== See also ==
- Comey (surname)
- Romy (given name)
- Romeyn
- Romney (surname)
