= Mawphanlur =

- Village
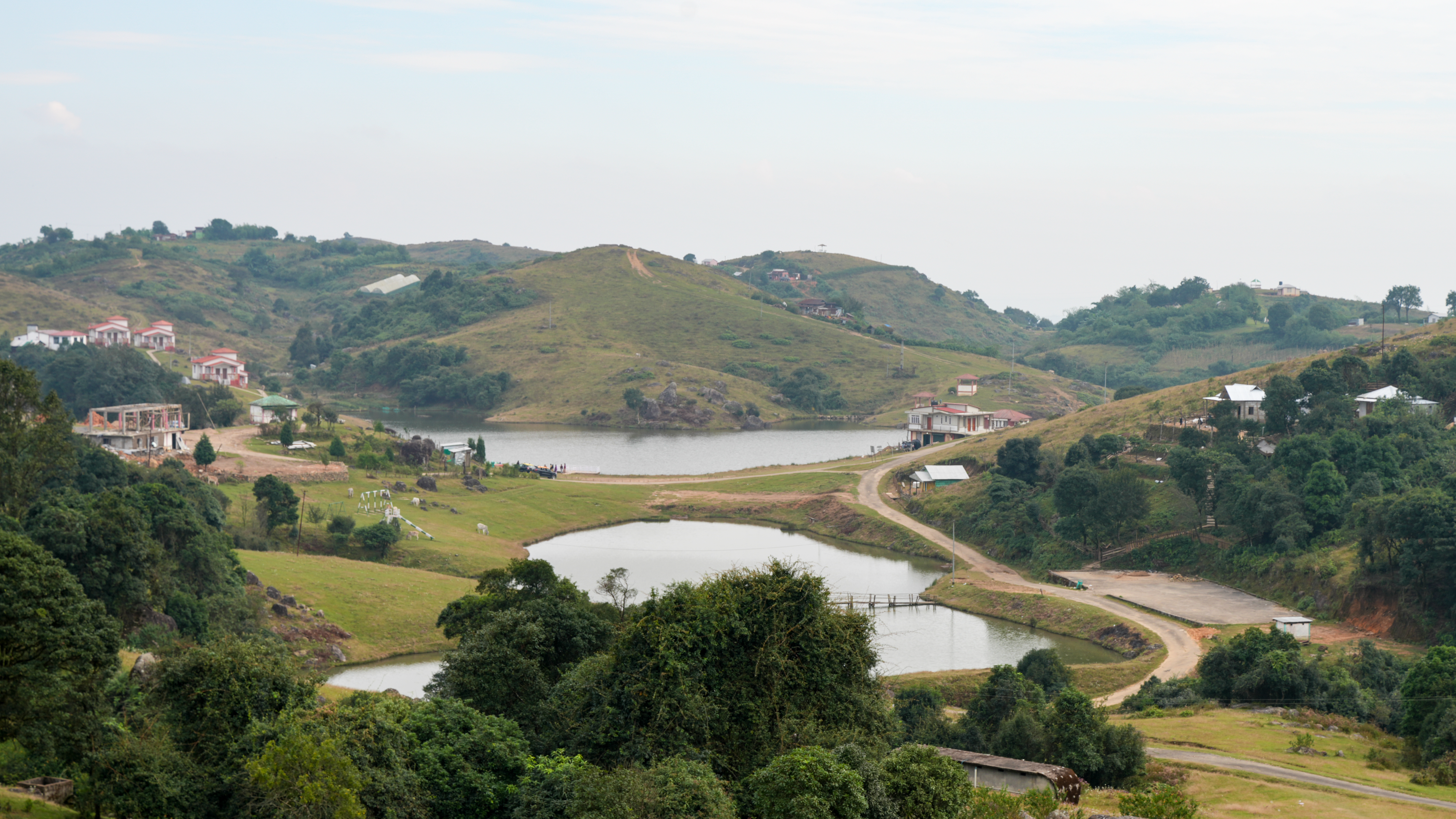
- Mawphanlur from the northwest

- Location within Meghalaya
- Coordinates: 25.546115°N 91.453226°E
- Country: India
- State: Meghalaya
- Elevation: 1,840 m (6,040 ft)

Population (2011)
  - Total: 189

Languages
  - Official: English
- Time zone: UTC+5:30 (IST)
- Postal Index Number: 793119
- Website: s3waas.gov.in

Mawphanlur is a village in the West Khasi Hills district, Meghalaya, India.

== Description ==
Mawphanlur is a small village near the crest of the West Khasi Hills. Nestled with seven artificial lakes in grass-covered hills at an elevation of 1,840 m (6,040 ft), Mawphanlur is a picturesque tourist attraction. The mainstay of the economy is tourism.

== History ==
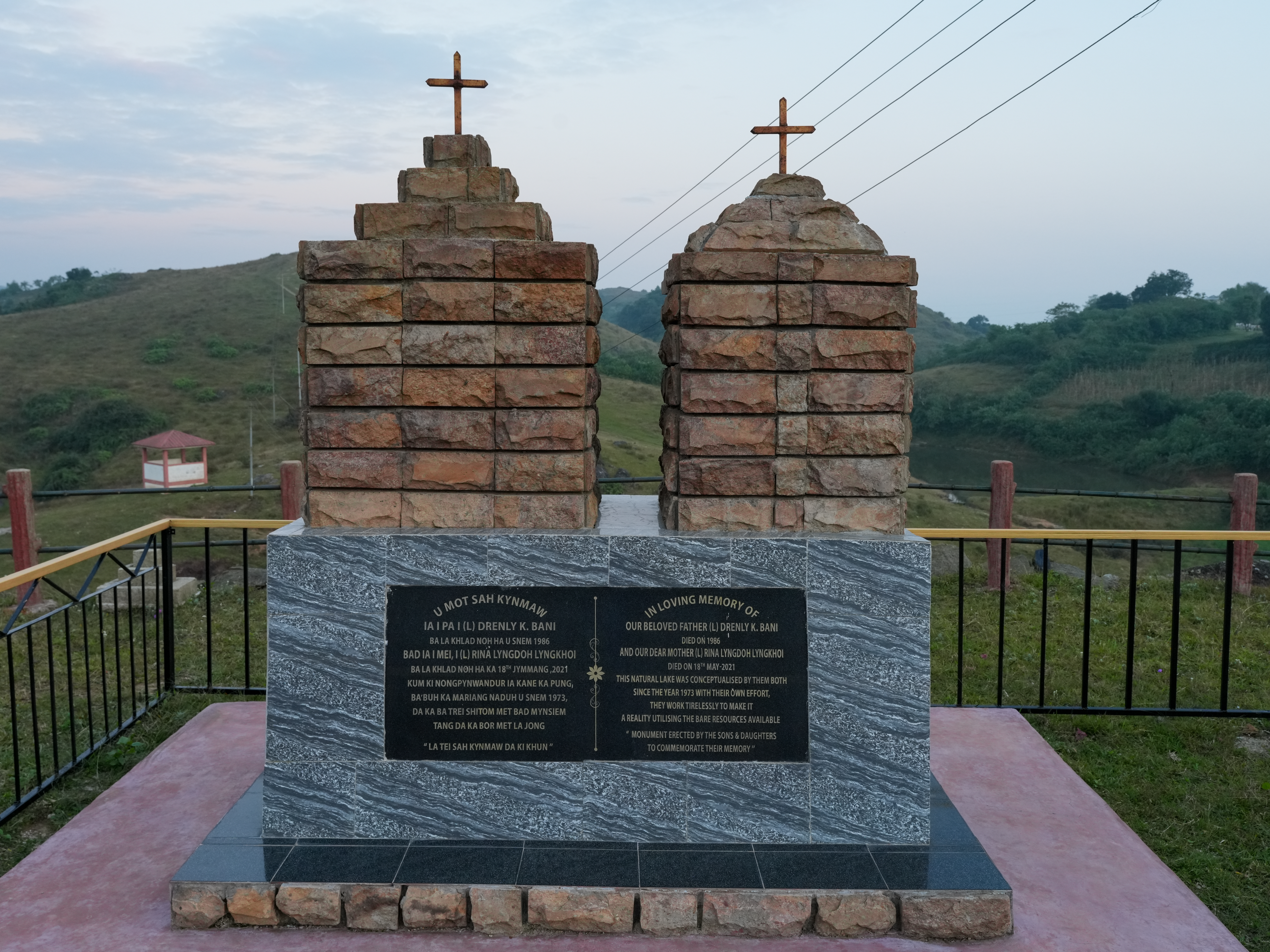
Memorial to Drenly K. Bani and Rina Lyngdoh Lyngkhoi, responsible for the lakes of Mawphanlur

Drenly K. Bani and Rina Lyngdoh Lyngkhoi conceptualised the lakes of Mawphanlur in 1973. They worked to make the concept a reality, turning the village into a tourist attraction.

== Geography ==
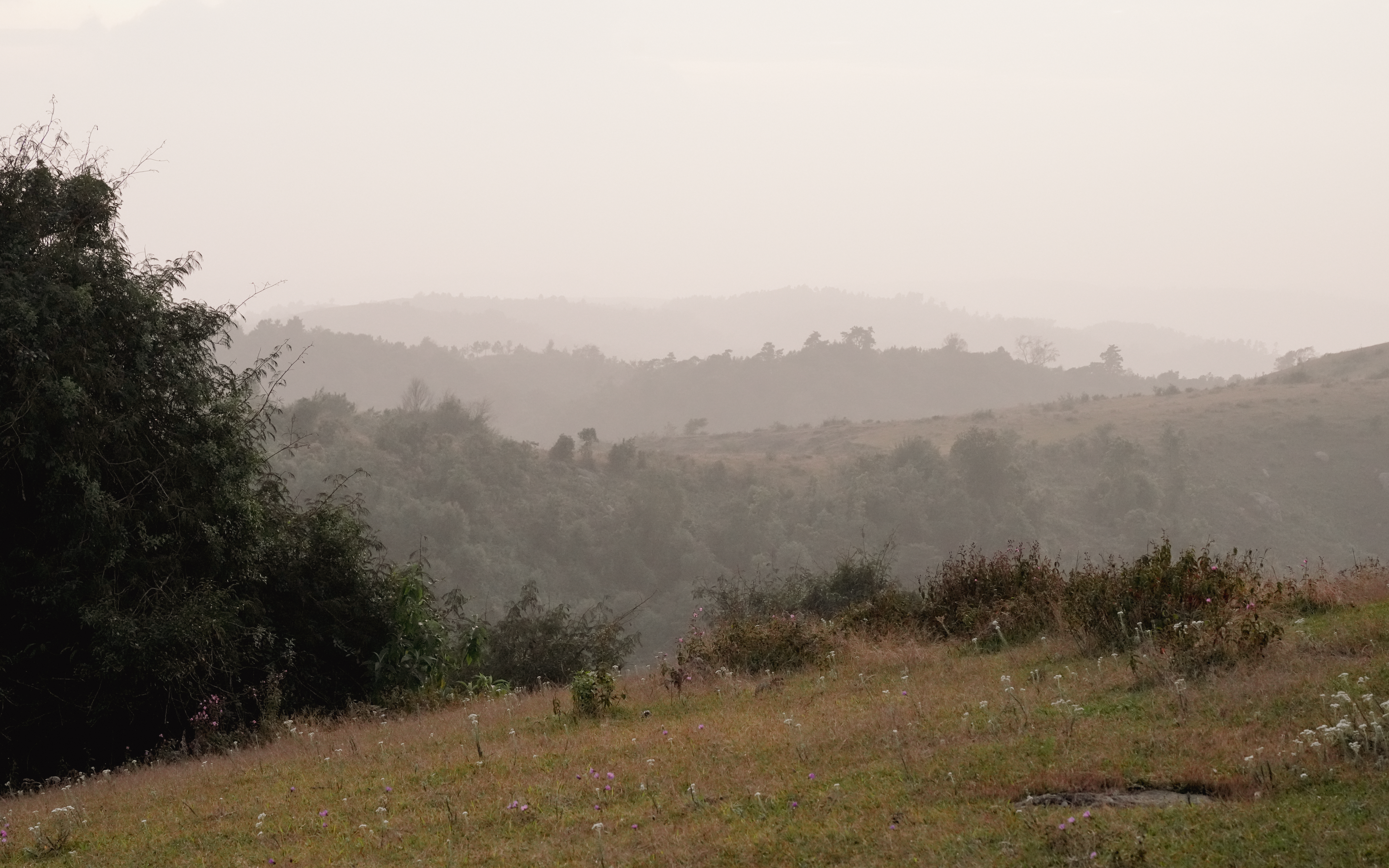
West Khasi Hills east of Mawphanlur at dusk

Mawphanlur is situated in the West Khasi Hills at an elevation of 1,840 m (6,040 ft). The distance from Mawphanlur to Nongstoin, the District Headquarter is 25 Kms and Mairang is 43 km (27 mi). Shillong, the capital of Meghalaya, is 72 km (45 mi).

=== Climate ===
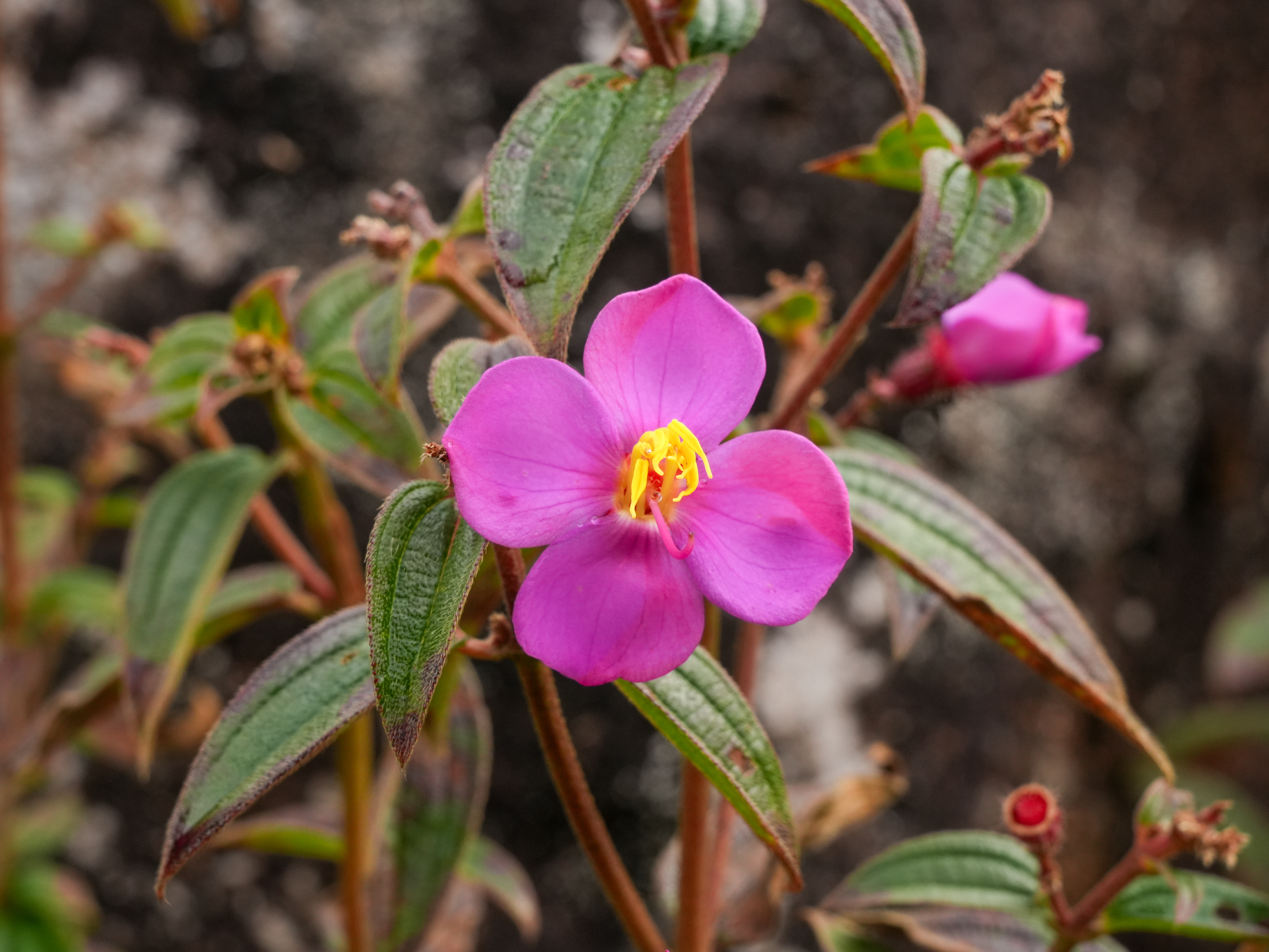
Osbeckia chinensis flowering in October

Mawphanlur has a summer season, a monsoon season, and a winter season. Summer is April to June, usually between 20°C and 30°C (68°F and 86°F) and low to moderate humidity. The monsoon season is July to September, between 18°C and 25°C (64.4°F and 77°F), accompanied by heavy rainfall and high humidity. Winter is October to March, between 10°C and 20°C (50°F and 68°F) and low humidity.

== Demographics ==
In 2011, the total population was 189 in 28 households. Among these 51.9% were female. There were no scheduled castes while 99.5% belonged to scheduled tribes. The literacy rate was 52.9%.

== Governance ==
Mawphanlur village is located in the Rambrai Community & Rural Development (C&RD) block in the West Khasi Hills District of Meghalaya. It falls in the Rambrai-Jyrngam Assembly constituency and in the Shillong Lok Sabha constituency.

== Amenities ==
As of 2011, pre-primary, primary and middle schooling were available in Mawphanlur. For secondary school and higher education, students had to commute more than 10 km (6.2 mi). The village has piped water supply. The village pincode is 793119 and the nearest post office is 5–10 km (3.1–6.2 mi) distant.

== Economy ==
The economy is largely dependant on tourism.

== Transport ==
Taxis and vans are available for hire. The nearest railway station and airport are in Guwahati, Assam, at distances of 129 km (80 mi) and 146 km (91 mi) respectively.

== Tourism ==
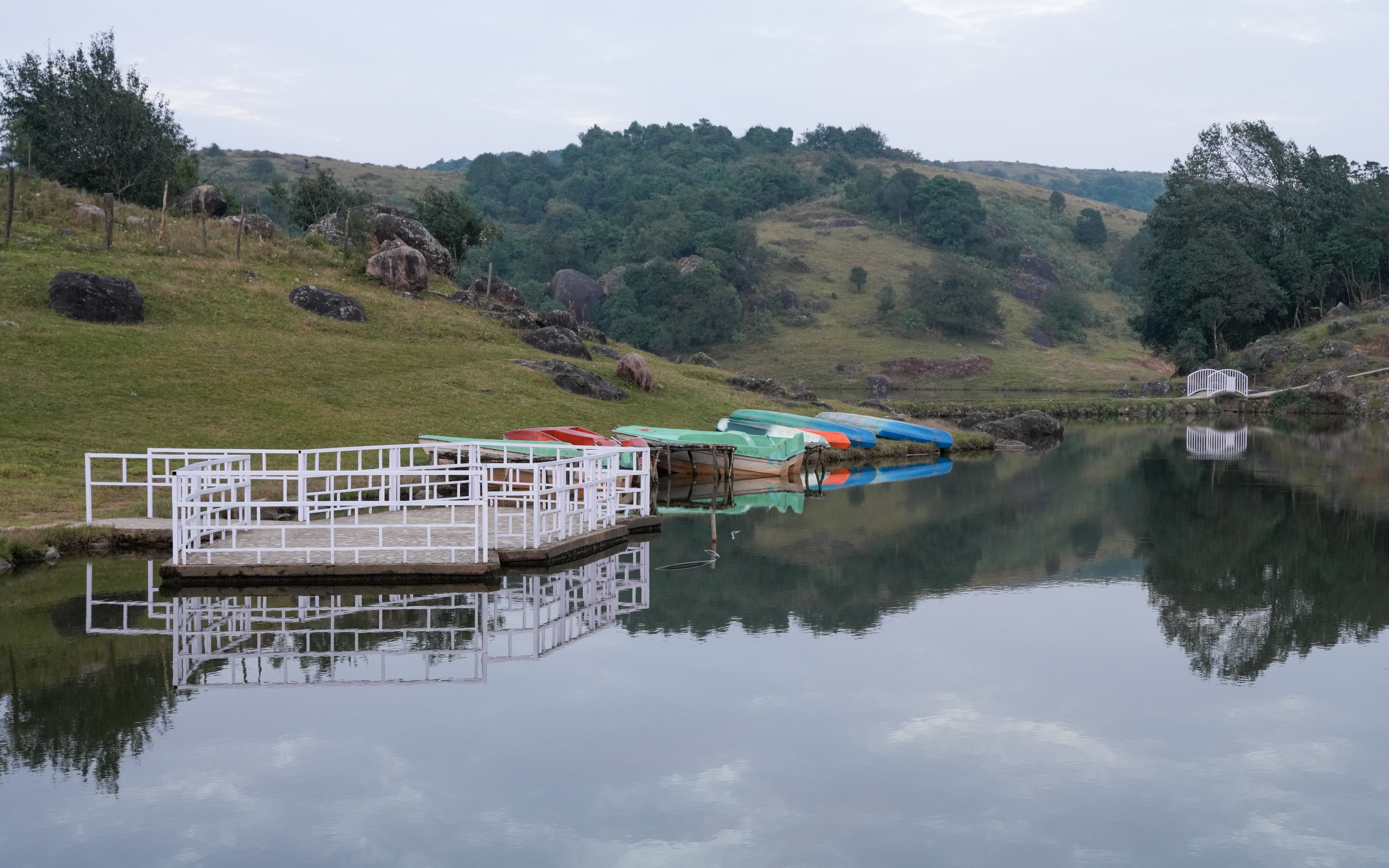
Boating for tourists

Nestled with seven artificial lakes in grass-covered hills at an elevation of 1,840 m (6,040 ft), Mawphanlur is a picturesque tourist attraction. Situated on top of a range of hills, it has cool breezes in summer. In 2024, Mawphanlur was one of 11 less-developed locations selected by the Government of Meghalaya for development of tourism infrastructure. The total amount budgeted was Rs. 200 crores (Rs. 2 billion).
