= Remy =

Remy or Rémy may refer to:

== Places ==
- Remy River, a tributary of rivière du Gouffre in Saint-Urbain, Quebec, Canada
- Rémy, Pas-de-Calais, a French commune in Pas-de-Calais
- Remy, Oise, France
- Remy, Oklahoma, United States
- 14683 Remy, an asteroid

== Other uses ==
- Rémy (name), including a list of people and fictional characters with the name
- Rémy Cointreau, a French drinks conglomerate, owner of Rémy Martin brand of cognac
- Remy International, an electrical systems company
- Remy Grand Brassard and Trophy Race, an automobile race sponsored by Remy Electric
- Remy, a type of artificial hair

== See also ==
- Pont-Remy, a French commune in Picardie
- Saint-Rémy (disambiguation), the name of numerous French communes
- Remi (disambiguation)
- Remigius (disambiguation)
