= Romen =

Romen may refer to:

== People ==
- Romen Sova, Soviet and Ukrainian toxicologist
- Romen (mencey), Guanche mencey king of Menceyato de Daute
- James Romen Boiragi, Bangladeshi Roman Catholic bishop

== Places ==
- Romen, Chitral, a suburb in state of Chitral, Pakistan
- Romen (river), in Ukraine
- Romen, former name for Romny, a city in Ukraine

== Other ==
- Romen Theatre, Russian Roma theatre, Moscow, Russia
- Romen Trio, Russian Roma trio, Moscow, Russia
