= Remington (given name) =

Remington is a given name. Notable people with the name include:

== People ==
- Remington Hoffman (born 1988), American actor and director
- Remington Kellogg (1892–1969), American naturalist and a director of the United States National Museum
- Remington Leith, singer of fashion-art rock band Palaye Royale
- Remington Gabil Momin (born 1973), Indian politician
- Remington Norman (fl. 1992), British wine merchant and author
- Remington Schuyler (1884–1955), American painter, illustrator, and writer
- Remington Vernam (land developer) (1843–1907), American lawyer, founder of Arverne
- Remington D. B. Vernam (1896–1918), American flying ace pilot
- Remington Williams (fl. from 2018), American fashion model

== Fictional characters ==
- Rip Kirby (Remington "Rip" Kirby), a comic strip detective character
- Remington Steele, protagonist of 1980s American TV series Remington Steele
- Remington Tufflips, in TV animated sitcom Sanjay and Craig

== See also ==
- Remington (surname)
