= Rimington (disambiguation) =

Rimington is a village in Lancashire, England.

Rimington may refer to:

== People ==
- Rimington (surname)
- Rimington Trophy, award in American football named for Dave Rimington

== Places ==
- Rimington, Ontario, Canada

== See also ==
- Remington (disambiguation)
- Rimmington (disambiguation)
