= Remington (surname) =

Remington is a surname. Notable people with this surname include:

== Art ==
- Barbara Remington (1929–2020), American artist and illustrator
- Deborah Remington (1930–2010), American painter
- Frederic Remington (1861–1909), American painter and sculptor
- Mary Remington (1910–2003), British artist
- Preston Remington (1897–1958), American art historian

== Music ==
- Emory Remington (1892–1971), American trombonist
- Herb Remington (1926–2018), American steel-guitar player
- Jennifer Kes Remington, American composer and filmmaker

== Politics and law ==
- Arthur Remington (1856–1909), New Zealand politician
- Cyrus Remington (1824–1878), American politician and jurist
- Frank J. Remington (1922–1995), American law professor
- Frederic Remington (politician) (1929–2016), American politician in New Jersey
- Jonathan Remington (1677–1745), American jurist in Massachusetts
- Keith Remington (1923–2020), Australian politician
- Ralph Remington (born 1963), American theater producer and former politician
- Ryan Remington, American police officer who killed American disabled man Richard Lee Richards (1960–2021)
- Tim Remington, American pastor and politician in Idaho

== Sports ==
- Ashley Remington (real name: Dalton Castle) (born 1986), an American professional wrestler
- Benjamin Remington (18th century), English cricketer
- Michael Remington (1757–1826), English cricketer
- Phil Remington (1921–2013), American motorsports engineer
- William Remington (athlete) (1879–1963), American track athlete and prelate of the Episcopal Church

== Other people ==
- Charles Lee Remington (1922–2007), American entomologist and lepidopterist
- Eliphalet Remington (1793–1861), American firearms designer
  - Eliphalet Remington III (1828–1924), American firearms and typewriter manufacturer, son of Eliphalet Remington
  - Philo Remington (1816–1889), American firearms and typewriter manufacturer, son of Eliphalet Remington
  - Samuel Remington (1819–1882) American firearms and typewriter manufacturer, son of Eliphalet Remington
- Jeffrey A. Remington (born c. 1955), United States Air Force general officer
- Joseph P. Remington (1847–1918), American pharmacist, manufacturer, and educator
- Richard Remington (c. early 17th century), English priest
- Richard D. Remington (1931–1992), American educator in Iowa
- William Remington (1917–1954), American economist and McCarthy era "communist suspect"

== Fictional characters ==
- Charles Remington, in the 1996 film The Ghost and the Darkness

== See also ==
- Remington (given name)
