= Anahuac (Aztec) =

Term for historical Mexican geography

Anahuac (Spanish: Anáhuac; Nahuatl: Anahuac, transl. "land next to the water(s)") is a Nahuatl name which means "close to water." It can be broken down as atl + -nahuac, where atl means "water" and the suffix -nahuac is a relational word that can be affixed to a noun, meaning "next to" or "close to." Anahuac is sometimes used interchangeably with "Valley of Mexico", but Anahuac properly designates the south-central part of the 8,000 km^{2} (3,089 sq mi) valley, where well-developed pre-Hispanic culture traits had created distinctive landscapes now hidden by the urban sprawl of Mexico City. In the sense of modern geomorphological terminology, "Valley of Mexico" is misnamed.

== Boundaries ==
According to the Encyclopædia Britannica Eleventh Edition, Anáhuac (sic) is "limited by the traditional and vaguely defined boundaries of an ancient American empire or confederation of that name previous to the Spanish conquest."

The word is said to signify "country by the waters" in Nahuatl, the old Aztec language; hence the theory that Anahuac was located on the sea coast. One of the theories relating to the location of Anahuac describes it as all the plateau region of Mexico, with an area equal to three-fourths of the republic, and extending between the eastern and western coast ranges from Rio Grande to the isthmus of Tehuantepec. A more exact and more commonly used description, however, limits it to the great plateau valley in which the city of Mexico is located, between 18°40' and 20°30'N latitude, about 320 kilometers (200 mi) long by 120 kilometers (75 mi) wide, with an average elevation of 2300 meters (7500 feet), and a mean temperature of 17°C (62°F). The accepted meaning of the name fits this region as well as any on the sea coast, as the lakes of this valley formerly covered one-tenth of its area. The existence of the name in southern Utah, United States, and on the gulf coast of Mexico, has given rise to theories of other locations and wider bounds for the old Indian empire.

One of the possible etymologies proposed for the name "Nicaragua" is that it is derived from any of the following Nahuatl words: nic-anahuac, which meant "Anahuac reached this far", or "the Nahuas came this far", or "those who come from Anahuac came this far"; nican-nahua, which meant "here are the Nahuas"; or nic-atl-nahuac, which meant "here by the water" or "surrounded by water". The first two explanations would have a bearing on the above issue of the borders.

== See also ==
- Aztlán
- Cemanahuac

== Sources ==
- Aguilar-Moreno, Manuel (2007a). "Aztec Art" (PDF). Aztec Art and Architecture. Foundation for the Advancement of Mesoamerican Studies, Inc. (FAMSI). Archived from the original (PDF online edition) on 25 June 2008.
- Aguilar-Moreno, Manuel (2007b). "Aztec Architecture" (PDF). Aztec Art and Architecture. Foundation for the Advancement of Mesoamerican Studies, Inc. (FAMSI). Archived from the original (PDF online edition) on 2008-05-13.
- Bierhorst, John (1985). A Nahuatl-English Dictionary and Concordance to the Cantares Mexicanos: With an Analytic Transcription and Grammatical Notes. Stanford, CA: Stanford University Press. ISBN 0-8047-1183-6. OCLC 11185890.
- Clavigero, Francesco Saverio (1817) [1780–81]. The history of Mexico. Collected from Spanish and Mexican historians, from manuscripts, and ancient paintings of the Indians. Illustrated by charts, and other copper plates. To which are added, critical dissertations on the land, the animals, and inhabitants of Mexico. 2 vols. Translated from the original Italian, by Charles Cullen, Esq. London: G. G. J. and J. Robinson. OCLC 2671015.
- Prescott, William H. (1843). History of the Conquest of Mexico, with a Preliminary View of Ancient Mexican Civilization, and the Life of the Conqueror, Hernando Cortes (online reproduction, Electronic Text Center, University of Virginia Library). New York: Harper and Brothers. OCLC 2458166.
- Tylor, Edward B. (1861). Anahuac: Or, Mexico and the Mexicans, Ancient and Modern (online reproduction at Project Gutenberg, EBook #13115). London: Longman, Green, Longman and Roberts. OCLC 24266605.
- Wimmer, Alexis (2006). "Dictionnaire de la langue nahuatl classique" (online version, incorporating reproductions from Dictionnaire de la langue nahuatl ou mexicaine [1885], by Rémi Siméon). Archived from the original on 2 July 2008. (in French and Nahuatl languages)
