= Kimfa Sidney Marbaniang =

Indian politician

Kimfa Sidney Marbaniang (born 7 January 1980) is an Indian politician from Meghalaya. He is a former member of the Meghalaya Legislative Assembly from the Rambrai-Jyrngam Assembly constituency, which is reserved for the Scheduled Tribe community, in the West Khasi Hills district, representing the Indian National Congress in 2018.

== Early life ==
Marbaniang is from Rambrai, Rambrai Syiemship, West Khasi Hills district, Meghalaya. He is the son of Paul Leong. He completed his BCom in 2003 at a college affiliated with University of Pune. He declared assets worth Rs.5 crore in his affidavit to the Election Commission of India.

== Career ==
Marbaniang won the Rambrai-Jyrngam Assembly constituency in the 2018 Meghalaya Legislative Assembly election representing the Indian National Congress. He polled 12,135 votes and defeated his nearest rival, K Phlastingwell Pangniang of the Hill State People's Democratic Party, by 3,803 votes. He first contested from the Rambrai Jyrngam seat as an independent candidate in the 2013 Meghalaya Legislative Assembly election, where he garnered 5,756 votes but lost to Phlastingwell Pangniang of the HSPDP, by 1869 votes.

In May 2026, he formed a new political outfit named, the Rambrai Jyrngam United People Forum.
