= Preston Remington =

American art historian (1897–1958)

- Born: July 17, 1897; New Bedford, Massachusetts, U.S.
- Died: April 7, 1958 (aged 60)
- Education: Harvard College, MIT
- Occupation: Curator
- Years active: 1923–1958
- Employer: Metropolitan Museum of Art

Preston Ashley Remington (Note: Remington's draft registration card of August 1918 includes his middle name, but it is absent from his draft registration card of February 1942.) (July 17, 1897 – April 7, 1958) was an American art historian who served as a curator at the Metropolitan Museum of Art in New York City between 1923 and 1958.

== Biography ==
Remington was born in 1897 in New Bedford, Massachusetts. He studied architecture at the Massachusetts Institute of Technology (MIT) during 1917–1918, and received a Bachelor of Arts degree from Harvard College in 1921. During World War I, he was a member of the Student Army Training Corps at Harvard. He was a member of the Phi Kappa Sigma fraternity. Remington returned to MIT as an instructor until 1923.

Remington joined New York City's Metropolitan Museum of Art in 1923, working in the Department of Decorative Arts as an assistant under curator Joseph Breck. Remington was offering public lectures on "foreign influence in American furniture" by December 1924. He served the remainder of his career at the museum as assistant curator (1924–1928), associate curator (1929–1933), curator in the newly formed Department of Renaissance and Modern Art (1934–1950) and its successor Department of Renaissance Art (1950–1957), and research curator there from 1957 to 1958.

After Breck died in 1933, the department was divided into three separate departments: Medieval art (under James J. Rorimer), Renaissance and Post-Renaissance art (under Remington), and American Art (under Joseph Downs). Remington later advanced to the Vice-Directorship of the Department of Renaissance and Post-Renaissance Art. Remington chaired the Museum's Committee on Architectural Rearrangement from 1941 to 1943. Composed of Museum curators and administrators, the Committee was tasked with surveying individual departments' existing storage, display, and conservation spaces to assist in future planning for Museum expansion. In the 1950s, Remington worked on the installation of the period rooms of the Museum, which opened in 1954. Throughout his career, he published extensively in the museum's journals on objects in its collection.

Remington was named Vice Director of the Museum in 1949, which combined major administrative responsibilities with a curatorial role. He retired from that position due to ill health in 1955. He continued to work on a catalogue of the Museum’s French silver, which had been bequeathed in large part by Catherine D. Wentworth during his tenure as curator. Remington also maintained relationships with major donors to the museum such as Jules Bache, Susan Dwight Bliss, Mr. and Mrs. Edward Harkness, and George Dupont Pratt.

After Remington died in 1958, Director James Rorimer noted that “The major accomplishment during his later years of service to the Museum was the installation of the collections of post-renaissance [sic] decorative arts in the new galleries,” including the reconstruction of period rooms that opened in November 1954.

== Selected publications ==
=== Books ===
- Sculptures by Antoine Louis Barye: A Picture Book. The Metropolitan Museum of Art. New York, 1940. ASIN B001Q8DFXE

=== Journals ===
- "A Louis XVI Bed." Bulletin of the Metropolitan Museum of Art, 19, no. 1 (January 1924), pp. 6–8.
- "An Ebony Cabinet of the Seventeenth Century." Bulletin of the Metropolitan Museum of Art, 26, no. 10, (October 1931), pp. 232–236.
- "Alpheus and Arethusa: A Marble Group by Battista Lorenzi." The Metropolitan Museum of Art Bulletin 35, no. 3 (March 1940), pp. 61–65 and ill. p. 49 (front cover).
- "A Room from the Hotel de Tesse." The Metropolitan Museum of Art Bulletin, n.s., 1, no. 6 (February 1943), pp. 189–195.
- "A Monument Honoring the Invention of the Balloon." The Metropolitan Museum of Art Bulletin, n.s, 2, no. 8 (April 1944), pp. 241–248.
- "The Galleries of European Decorative Art & Period Rooms: Chiefly XVII & XVIII Century." The Metropolitan Museum of Art Bulletin, n.s., 13, no. 3 (November 1954), pp. 65–71.
