= Remington House =

Remington House can refer to the following:

- Frederic Remington House, listed on the NRHP in Connecticut
- Remington House (Kinne Corners, New York), listed on the NRHP in New York
- Potter-Remington House, listed on the NRHP in Rhode Island
