= Cemanahuac =

Aztec view of the world

Cēmānāhuac is the name used by the Aztecs to refer to their world. It corresponds to the modern term Mesoamerica.

== History ==
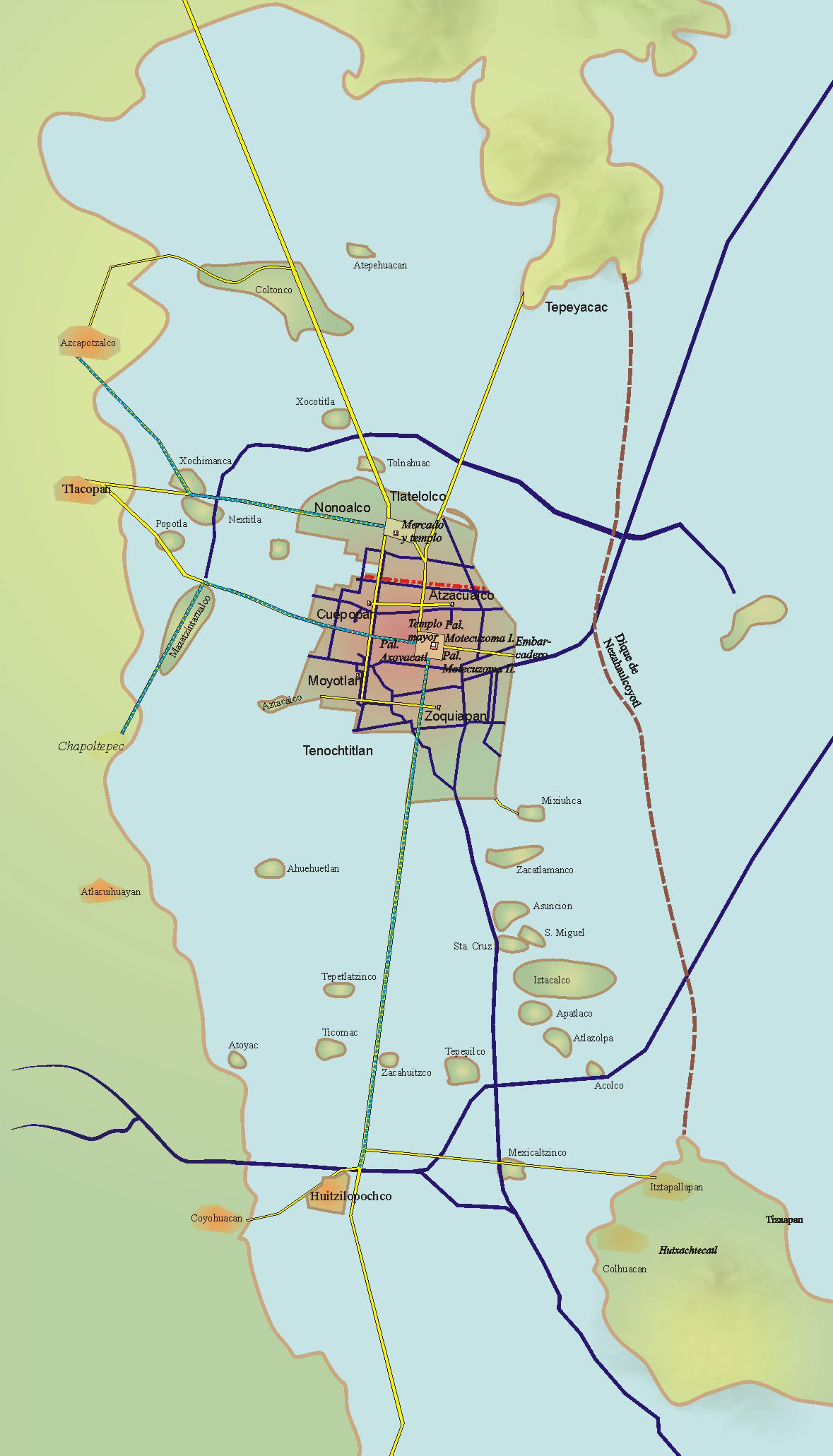
Tenochtitlan and islands in the Texcoco Lake.

The Aztec people who came from Aztlán and settled in Tenochtitlan (today's Mexico City) called their land Cemanahuac, knowing their land was surrounded by the Pacific Ocean, the Gulf of Mexico, and the Caribbean Sea. The notion of Cemanahuac is also tied to the pyramid-driven philosophy of the Aztecs, their land sitting on top of a natural pyramid (chain of mountains of Central Mexico culminating in Tenochtitlan) the same way that Aztecs leaders sit on top of the Aztec pyramids (and the same way Aztec people engineered their social life). Tenochtitlan perfectly fit into this pyramidal paradigm, thus the association of the city to Cemanahuac. The city of Aztlán from which the Aztecs originated was also surrounded by water.

== Definition ==
Cemanahuac is a Nahuatl name derived from the words "cē" one/whole and "Ānāhuac", which in turn derives from the words "atl" (water) and "nahuac", a locative meaning "circumvented or surrounded". Hence, the name can be literally translated as "land completely surrounded by water", or "[the] totality [of what is] next to water". The early Western literature on the Nahuatl culture and language agreed on the translation "world" for the term Cemanahuac.

The term refers to the consciousness that the Mexica had of the American territory they knew, surrounded by two great oceans, the Atlantic Ocean and the Pacific Ocean.

== Orthographic variants ==
Cemanahuatl, cemanauac, cemanhuactli, cemanaoac, cemanavac.

== See also ==
- Aztlán
- Tenochtitlan
