= Jean-Rémy Badio =

Haitian photographer and journalist

- Died: January 19, 2007; Martissant, Port-au-Prince, Haiti
- Cause of death: Murder
- Resting place: Martissant, Port-au-Prince, Haiti
- Occupations: Journalist & photographer
- Employer: Freelance
- Notable work: Reporting on Haiti's gang activity in Martissant
- Title: Photographer, journalist

Jean-Rémy Badio (died 19 January 2007) was a freelance Haitian photographer and journalist for Le Matin in Martissant, Port-au-Prince, Haiti.

== Personal ==
Badio was a resident of Martissant, Haiti, a poor area along the southern part of Port-au-Prince.

== Career ==
Jean-Rémy Badio was a freelance reporter in Martissant, Haiti. Martissant was known for its gang activity when Badio began reporting it. Badio began taking photos of armed gang members and reporting this to the local dailies, primarily the Port-au-Prince newspaper Le Matin.

== Death ==
Martissant is shown within Haiti relative to the capital Port-au-Prince.

Prior to Badio's death, he took photos of a gang war near his home in Martissant, Haiti. After these photos were taken, he began receiving death threats at his home because his photos featured the faces of those gang members. On January 19, 2007; Badio was shot in his home in Martissant. No one else was harmed in this act.

== Context ==
The civilian vigilante group, Lame Ti Manchet (the Little Machete Army) are thought to be responsible for most of the killings in the Martissant area since the overthrow of its elected government in 2004. Lame Ti Manchet and Baz Gran Ravin are two gangs in Martissant that have been fighting for control over the city since 2004. Pictures surfacing in local news of Lame Ti Manchet or Baz Gran Ravin with their faces shown could lead to their arrests. Though there are members of the Haitian police that are working with Lame Ti Manchet, as 15 members of the police force were arrested in 2006. Since Badio's murder, no arrests have been made regarding either group.

== Impact ==
Since the murder, the Haitian government has kept a closer watch on suspected members of the two gang groups.

== Reactions ==
Amnesty International condemned the murder of Jean-Rémy Badio. Haitian authorities have expressed that they wish to investigate Badio's murder swiftly and thoroughly, while promising to make the results public.

== See also ==
- Gang
