= Saint-Rémy =

Saint-Rémy or Saint-Remy (French for Saint Remigius) may refer to:

== Places ==
=== Belgium ===
- Saint-Remy, district of the municipality of Chimay, province of Hainaut, Wallonia
- Saint-Remy, district of the municipality of Blegny, province of Liège, Wallonia

=== France ===
- Saint-Rémy, Ain, in the Ain département
- Saint-Rémy, Aveyron, in the Aveyron département
- Saint-Rémy, Calvados, in the Calvados département
- Saint-Rémy, Corrèze, in the Corrèze département
- Saint-Rémy, Côte-d'Or, in the Côte-d'Or département
- Saint-Rémy, Deux-Sèvres, in the Deux-Sèvres département
- Saint-Rémy, Dordogne, in the Dordogne département
- Saint-Rémy, Saône-et-Loire, in the Saône-et-Loire département
- Saint-Remy, Vosges, in the Vosges département (without the accent aigu)
- Saint-Rémy-au-Bois, in the Pas-de-Calais département
- Saint-Rémy-aux-Bois, in the Meurthe-et-Moselle département
- Saint-Rémy-Blanzy, in the Aisne département
- Saint-Rémy-Boscrocourt, in the Seine-Maritime département
- Saint-Remy-Chaussée, in the Nord département
- Saint-Rémy-de-Blot, in the Puy-de-Dôme département
- Saint-Rémy-de-Chargnat, in the Puy-de-Dôme département
- Saint-Rémy-de-Chaudes-Aigues, in the Cantal département
- Saint-Rémy-de-Maurienne, in the Savoie département
- Saint-Rémy-de-Provence, in the Bouches-du-Rhône département
- Saint-Rémy-de-Sillé, in the Sarthe département
- Saint-Rémy-des-Landes, in the Manche département
- Saint-Rémy-des-Monts, in the Sarthe département
- Saint-Remy-du-Nord, in the Nord département
- Saint-Rémy-du-Plain, in the Ille-et-Vilaine département
- Saint-Rémy-du-Val, in the Sarthe département
- Saint-Remy-en-Bouzemont-Saint-Genest-et-Isson, in the Marne département
- Saint-Rémy-en-Comté, in the Haute-Saône département
- Saint-Remy-en-l'Eau, in the Oise département
- Saint-Rémy-en-Mauges, in the Maine-et-Loire département
- Saint-Rémy-en-Rollat, in the Allier département
- Saint-Rémy-l'Honoré, in the Yvelines département
- Saint-Remy-la-Calonne, in the Meuse département
- Saint-Rémy-la-Vanne, in the Seine-et-Marne département
- Saint-Rémy-la-Varenne, in the Maine-et-Loire département
- Saint-Remy-le-Petit, in the Ardennes département
- Saint-Rémy-lès-Chevreuse, in the Yvelines département
- Saint-Remy-sous-Barbuise, in the Aube département
- Saint-Remy-sous-Broyes, in the Marne département
- Saint-Rémy-sur-Avre, in the Eure-et-Loir département
- Saint-Remy-sur-Bussy, in the Marne département
- Saint-Rémy-sur-Creuse, in the Vienne département
- Saint-Rémy-sur-Durolle, in the Puy-de-Dôme département

== Surname ==
- Jean Le Fèvre de Saint-Remy (c.1394-1468), Burgundian seigneur and chronicler
- Joseph Saint-Rémy, Haitian historian
- M. de Saint-Remy, a pseudonym used by Charles Auguste Louis Joseph, duc de Morny

== See also ==
- Saint-Rémi, Quebec
