= Remington Hill, California =

Remington Hill
- Former settlement
- Location in California
- Coordinates: 39°16′43″N 120°47′38″W
- Country: United States
- State: California
- County: Nevada County
- Elevation: 4,052 ft (1,235 m)

Remington Hill is a historic mining camp in Nevada County, California which prospered in the second half of the 19th century. It was named for Caleb Remington, a prominent local miner who lived mostly in neighboring Little York, where he died in 1865. It lay at an elevation of 4052 feet (1235 m). It was situated around present Chalk Bluff Road about one mile south of Highway 20 and about 5.5 miles southeast of the town of Washington and 6 miles northeast of Dutch Flat, as the crow flies.

== History ==
Little is known about its history. In 1854, it is described as a prosperous mining camp. Its population in 1855 was recorded as 75. By 1858, it was connected by stage to Nevada City. In early 1859, a snowstorm crushed a number of homes and businesses, including a hotel, stable and slaughterhouse. It did not have a school house or a post office. Residents got their mail at Red Dog, until that post office closed in 1869, and sent their children to the Liberty Hill school district schoolhouse, located in neighboring Lowell Hill.

Its leading citizens included Caleb Remington, who owned a number of local mines and mills, was active in politics and ran unsuccessfully for county sheriff in 1854, and John Timmons, one of the builders of the Remington Hill and South Yuba ditches, who became a millionaire, lost it all and died in the poorhouse.

Remington Hill was almost destroyed by fire in 1902. The fire burned for about two weeks over an area six by seven miles, destroying much timber and a number of homes before it was brought under control.

== Mining ==
Remington Hill lay on a gold bearing gravel channel on the Chalk Bluff Ridge, which lies between Steep Hollow and Greenhorn Creeks, tributaries of the Bear River. As the channel runs southwest, it joins a major channel running from the San Juan Ridge easterly through Red Dog and You Bet into Placer County. Remington Hill became a center for both hydraulic and drift mining. Water for hydraulic mining was brought from Steep Hollow Creek by a 16 mile ditch constructed between 1854 and 1857. One of the town's claims to fame was that large gold nuggets or gold bearing boulders were found in the vicinity.

Hydraulic mining came to an end in the early 1880s as a result of legal rulings banning the discharge of "tailings" (gravel which had been stripped of its gold) into the Bear and Yuba Rivers. It was later estimated that 1,750,000 cubic yards of gravel had been excavated from Remington Hill. Drift mining continued profitably in the area into the early 1900s and sporadically thereafter. Today, there is nothing left of the town, but Remington Hill can be located on many digital maps.
