= Catherine D. Wentworth =

American painter and collector

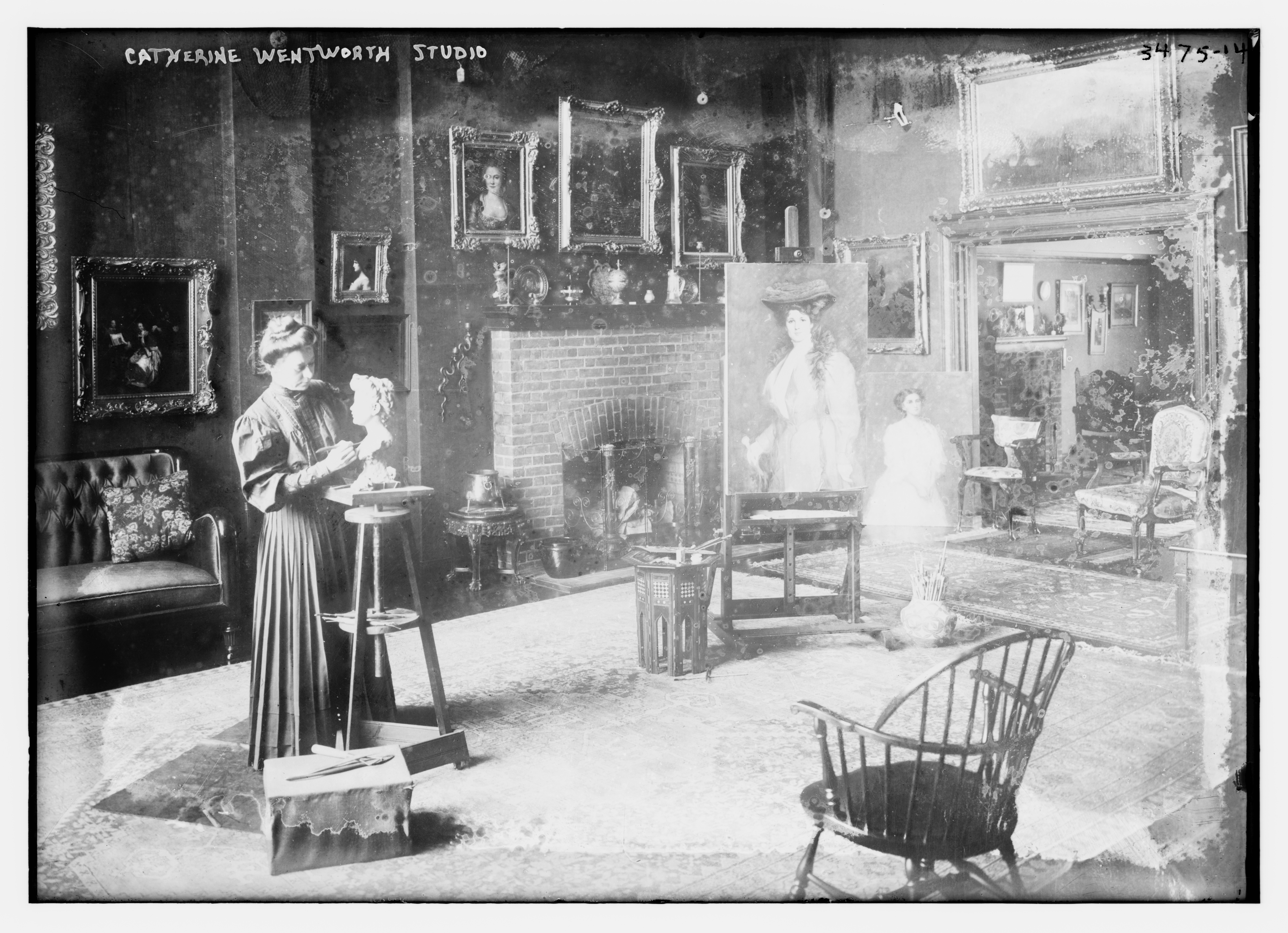
- Photograph shows Wentworth's studio. The image was taken in the period between 1910 and 1915, and is part of the George Grantham Bain collection.
- Born: Matilde Catherine Denkmann; 1865; Rock Island, Illinois, US
- Died: March 3, 1948
- Other names: Mrs. Edward S. Wentworth
- Education: Wellesley College

Matilde Catherine Denkmann Wentworth (1865 – March 3, 1948) was an American artist known for her portraits of women and a benefactor of New York City's Metropolitan Museum of Art.

== Early life ==
Wentworth, born as Matilde Catherine Denkman and known as Catherine, was born in 1865 in Rock Island, Illinois, the daughter of the lumberman Frederick C. A. Denkmann and his wife (Anna) Catherine Bloedel Denkmann. She was one of the seven children in the family. Her first art lessons were at St. Katherine’s School in Davenport, Iowa. She graduated from Wellesley College in 1886 and had her early training at the Art Institute of Chicago. She then went abroad and studied both in Paris at the Julian Academy and in Munich under Carl Marr. Later, one of her masters was William-Adolph Bouguereau.

In 1898 she married Edward Spencer Wentworth, an opera singer. In 1910 they moved to Paris where they would live for many years.

== Career ==
Wentworth was known for her portraits of both men and women, portraits that featured prominent personages of the time, including women, opera stars, composers such as Alexandre Georges, other artistic people, and friends or acquaintances. Wentworth had portraits exhibited in the Paris Salon, news that reached the United States in 1914 and again in 1921. She also exhibited her portraits in the United States. In 1925, she exhibited paintings and small bronze statues at the Galerie Jean Charpenter. News on exhibits of her portraits was covered in Paris and the United States.

Wentworth's portraits around in the permanent collections of museums, including museums in Clermont-Ferrand and Toulouse. Her portrait of Letitia (Mrs. Wentworth Sr.) is in the permanent collection of the Metropolitan Museum of Art. Her portrait of Mrs. McLaughlin was purchased by the Metropolitan Museum of Art in 1940. Her painting of the French singer Léon Melchissédec was first shown at a gallery in Paris and has since been exhibited at the Museum at Clermont-Ferrand.

She moved back to the United States and in 1935, she purchased an estate in Montecito, California, and there she became involved in the Santa Barbara annual flower show sharing tropical fruits grown on her property. In 1940 Wentworth's portraits were exhibited at the Palace of the Legion of Honor in San Francisco.

Wentworth died in 1948. She bequeathed a portion of her estate to New York's Metropolitan Museum of Art, which included a donation to construct a room on a lower level to permanently display her collections of French fabrics, lace, ceramics, 18th century French silver and pictures. The collection was described in 1949. The Pasadena Art Institute has a room called the Catherine D. Wentworth room which holds 16th century linen fold paneling.

== Awards and honors ==
Wentworth was the first woman to win the Julian Academy's prize for figure drawing. Wentworth was a member of the French Academy of Arts and Science.
