= Remington Gabil Momin =

Indian politician

Remington Gabil Momin (born 1973) is an Indian politician from Meghalaya. He is a member of the Meghalaya Legislative Assembly from the Rambrai-Jyrngam Assembly constituency, which is reserved for Scheduled Tribe community, in West Khasi Hills district. He was first elected in the 2023 Meghalaya Legislative Assembly election as an independent candidate.

== Early life and education ==
Momin is from Sildubi village, West Khasi Hills district, Meghalaya. He is the son of Ledison D Shira. He is a retired government employee and his wife is a teacher. He completed his M.A. in rural development in 2014 at Indira Gandhi National Open University. Earlier, he completed his B.Ed. at North Eastern Hill University, Shillong in 1996.

== Career ==
Momin won the Rambrai-Jyrngam Assembly constituency as an independent politician in the 2023 Meghalaya Legislative Assembly election. He polled 9,057 votes and defeated his nearest rival, K. Phlastingwell Pangiang of the Hill State People's Democratic Party, by a margin of 110 votes.
