= Remi Dada =

- Born: 15 February 1986 (age 40); Lagos State, Nigeria
- Education: University of Illinois; Howard University
- Occupations: Founder and CEO of Spacefinish

Remi Dada (born 15 February 1986) is a Nigerian architect and entrepreneur. He is the founder and CEO of Spacefinish, which designs innovative workspaces and offices.

== Early life ==
Dada was born and raised in Lagos State, Nigeria, in the family of Dada Gbolahan. He attended St. Savior’s School, Ebute Metta, followed by Atlantic Hall Secondary School, both in Lagos. He earned a Bachelor of Science degree in architectural studies from the University of Illinois Urbana-Champaign. He then obtained a master's degree in business administration from Howard University in Washington D.C.

== Career ==
Dada worked as an architect for the Illinois-based architectural firm Cordogan, Clark & Associates from 2006 until 2009, when he was recruited by NIA Architects in Chicago. He briefly worked with Chick-fil-A, where he redesigned the restaurant's space to transform the user experience.

=== Google ===
In 2012, Dada moved back to Nigeria, where he was appointed the product marketing lead for Google. During his time there, Dada and his team were tasked with tailoring Google products to the Nigerian/African market, localizing products such as Google Search and YouTube into Nigerian languages. After attending a business management training at the Wharton School of the University of Pennsylvania, he became the B2C Product Marketing Head at YouTube for Sub-Saharan Africa, a position he held for over a year.

=== Spacefinish ===
After leaving YouTube, Dada founded Spacefinish, which he registered in 2018 as a design/build company specializing in office interior architecture. The company worked on the Vibranium Valley Project, commissioned by Ventures Garden Group. The project, which was inaugurated by the Vice-President of Nigeria, Professor Yemi Osinbanjo, has been described as the largest tech hub in sub-Saharan Africa.

Spacefinish designed and re-designed office spaces for major corporations in Nigeria, including Google Nigeria, Andela, Stanbic IBTC Bank, Sterling Bank and RenMoney.
