= George Adam Pfeiffer =

American mathematician

George Adam Pfeiffer (16 July 1889, New York City – 28 December 1943) was an American mathematician.

Pfeiffer received in 1910 his master's degree in engineering from Stevens Institute of Technology and then his A.M. in 1911 and in 1914 his Ph.D. in mathematics from Columbia University. He spent the academic year 1914–1915 as a Benjamin Pierce Instructor at Harvard University and then in 1915 became an instructor at Princeton University. During WW I, he was in the U.S. army and at Princeton University taught meteorology to army aviation students. After the war he taught, starting as an instructor in February 1919, at Columbia University. There he became in 1924 an assistant professor and in 1931 an associate professor, in which position he remained until his death from a heart attack following minor surgery in 1943.

Pfeiffer is known for publishing the first example of a holomorphic function with a non-linearizable irrational indifferent fixed point. The question of the linearizability of fixed points is of great importance in complex dynamics. After Pfeiffer's example, Hubert Cremer gave various criteria for the non-linearizability of irrational indifferent fixed points, while Carl Ludwig Siegel in 1942 gave conditions which imply the linearizability of such fixed points.

Pfeiffer was on the editorial staff of Annals of Mathematics.

== Sources ==
- Daniel Alexander, Felice Iavernaro, Alessandro Rosa: Early days in complex dynamics: a history of complex dynamics in one variable 1906-1940, History of Mathematics 38, American Mathematical Society 2012; biography of Pfeiffer on p. 365

== Selected publications ==
- "On the conformal geometry of analytic arcs." American Journal of Mathematics 37, no. 4 (1915): 395–430. doi:10.2307/2370214
- "Note on the linear dependence of analytic functions." Bulletin of the American Mathematical Society 23, no. 3 (1916): 117–118. MR 1559879
- "A property of the level lines of a region with a rectifiable boundary." Bulletin of the American Mathematical Society 34, no. 5 (1928): 656–664. MR 1561631
