= Rimmington =

Rimmington may refer to:

- Edith Rimmington, English artist, poet and photographer
- Eric Rimmington, English painter
- Nathan Rimmington, Australian cricketer
- Norman Rimmington, English footballer
- Rebecca Rimmington, English cyclist
- Rikki-Lee Rimmington, Australian cricketer
- Russ Rimmington, former mayor of Hamilton, New Zealand

== See also ==
- Rimington (disambiguation)
- The Rivingtons, a 1960s band
- The Rippingtons, an American contemporary jazz group
