= Rémi (politician) =

Malagasy politician

Rémi (called: Jao Jean, died 24 June 2023 at 67 years in Mauritius) was a Malagasy politician. A member of the National Assembly of Madagascar, he was elected from the Fanjava Velogno party at every parliamentary election since 1998. He represented the constituency of Antsohihy and has been substituted by Zita Velonanosy.

In 2011, he had been arrested for child sexual abuse.
