= Remington Historic District =

Historic district in Virginia, United States

- U.S. National Register of Historic Places
- U.S. Historic district
- Virginia Landmarks Register
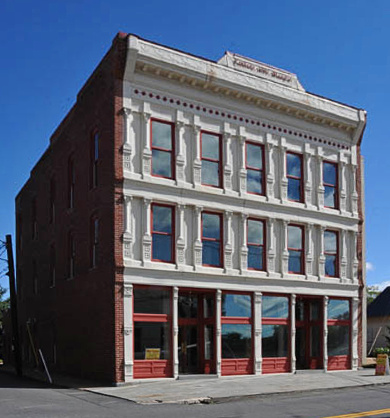

- Location within Northern Virginia Location within Virginia Location within the United States
- Location: Area including Bowen St., N. Church St., N. Franklin St., N. John Stone St., Main St., S. Mill St. Sumerduck Rd. Tinpot, Remington, Virginia
- Coordinates: 38°32′12″N 77°48′26″W
- Area: 49 acres (20 ha)
- Built: 1852
- Architectural style: Greek Revival, Late Victorian
- NRHP reference No.: 05000395
- VLR No.: 288-5001

Significant dates
- Added to NRHP: May 5, 2005
- Designated VLR: March 16, 2005

Remington Historic District is a national historic district located at Remington, Fauquier County, Virginia. It encompasses 131 contributing buildings, 1 contributing site, and 2 contributing structures in the rural village of Remington. The district consists primarily of late-19th- and early-20th-century dwellings, churches, and commercial buildings that illustrate the town's growth and development. Notable buildings include the Rouse House (c. 1850), Remington Methodist Church (1872), St. Luke's Episcopal Church (1881), Remington Baptist Church (1884), the Daniels House (c. 1888), Remington Farmer's Co-op Building (c. 1903), Groves Hardware Building (1905), and the State Bank of Remington (1913).

It was listed on the National Register of Historic Places in 2005.
