= Rambrai-Jyrngam Assembly constituency =

Legislative Assembly constituency in Meghalaya State, India

Coordinates: 25.65°N 91.32°E

Rambrai-Jyrngam
- Constituency No. 33 for the Meghalaya Legislative Assembly

Constituency details
- Country: India
- Region: Northeast India
- State: Meghalaya
- District: West Khasi Hills
- Lok Sabha constituency: Shillong
- Established: 2008
- Total electors: 39,415
- Reservation: ST

Member of Legislative Assembly
- 11th Meghalaya Legislative Assembly
- Incumbent Remington Gabil Momin
- Party: Independent
- Elected year: 2023

Rambrai-Jyrngam is one of the 60 Legislative Assembly constituencies of Meghalaya state in India. It is part of West Khasi Hills district and is reserved for candidates belonging to the Scheduled Tribes. It was created after the passing of the Delimitation of Parliamentary and Assembly constituencies, 2008 and had its first election in 2013. As of 2023, it is represented by Remington Gabil Momin, an Independent.

== Members of the Legislative Assembly ==
Election	Name	Party
2013	Phlastingwell Pangniang	Hill State People's Democratic Party
2018	Kimfa Sidney Marbaniang	Indian National Congress
2023	Remington Gabil Momin	Independent

== Election results ==
=== Assembly Election 2023 ===
2023 Meghalaya Legislative Assembly election: Rambrai-Jyrngam
Party	Candidate	Votes	%	±%
Independent	Remington Gabil Momin	9,057	26.75%	New
HSPDP	K. Phlastingwel Pangniang	8,947	26.43%	▼3.40
NPP	Kimfa Sidney Marbaniang	7,272	21.48%	▲9.11
INC	A Goldenstar Nonglong	5,805	17.15%	▼26.29
AITC	Fernandez S. Dkhar	1,554	4.59%	New
BJP	Spasterlin Nongrem	689	2.04%	▲0.64
Independent	Francis Pondit R. Sangma	373	1.10%	New
NOTA	None of the Above	196	0.58%	▼0.45
Margin of victory		110	0.32%	▼13.29
Turnout		33,856	85.90%	▼0.66
Registered electors		39,415		▲22.12
Independent gain from INC		Swing	▼16.69	

=== Assembly Election 2018 ===
2018 Meghalaya Legislative Assembly election: Rambrai-Jyrngam
Party	Candidate	Votes	%	±%
INC	Kimfa Sidney Marbaniang	12,135	43.44%	▲26.05
HSPDP	K Phlastingwell Pangniang	8,332	29.82%	▼4.56
NPP	Alfred Kharbani	3,455	12.37%	New
PDF	Synranlang Nongshlong	2,564	9.18%	New
Independent	Sillash M Sangma	600	2.15%	New
BJP	Sumis N Marak	391	1.40%	New
NOTA	None of the Above	287	1.03%	New
Margin of victory		3,803	13.61%	▲5.18
Turnout		27,937	86.56%	▼0.69
Registered electors		32,275		▲27.00
INC gain from HSPDP		Swing	▲9.05	

=== Assembly Election 2013 ===
2013 Meghalaya Legislative Assembly election: Rambrai-Jyrngam
Party	Candidate	Votes	%	±%
HSPDP	Phlastingwell Pangniang	7,625	34.39%	New
Independent	Kimfa Sidney Marbaniang	5,756	25.96%	New
UDP	Jova Marak	4,236	19.10%	New
INC	Kingford Kharsyntiew	3,856	17.39%	New
Independent	Andrew Charles Gare	597	2.69%	New
LJP	Bonifirst Nongrem	103	0.46%	New
Margin of victory		1,869	8.43%	
Turnout		22,173	87.25%	
Registered electors		25,413		
HSPDP win (new seat)				

== See also ==
- List of constituencies of the Meghalaya Legislative Assembly
- West Khasi Hills district
