= Cyrus Wadia =

American policy analyst

- Education: Ph.D. in Energy & Resources (U.C. Berkeley), M.S. and S.B. in Chemical Engineering (MIT)
- Known for: Sustainability leadership, clean-energy innovation, and policy
- Title: CEO of Activate
- Awards: MIT Tech Review Innovators Under 35 (2009)

Dr. Cyrus Wadia is an American CEO focused on sustainability expert. He is currently the CEO of Activate and has previously held leadership positions at Amazon and Nike. He also served as Assistant Director in the White House Office of Science and Technology Policy.

== Career ==
Dr. Cyrus Wadia is the CEO of Activate, a non-profit organization that provides fellowships and related services to scientists and engineers to commercialize their research projects.

Wadia served as the Vice President of Business Innovation at Nike, where he oversaw the company's sustainable innovation efforts. He then served as Director of Worldwide Product Sustainability at Amazon, where he launched Amazon's Climate Pledge Friendly badging program. As part of this initiative, he introduced Aware, a line of Amazon products certified as sustainable by third-party organizations. Additionally, Wadia held a dual appointment at Lawrence Berkeley National Laboratory and the Haas School of Business, where he co-directed Clean Tech to Market and worked as a guest scientist.

In 2010, Wadia was appointed as a science advisor to the Obama administration. He worked on initiatives aligned with President Obama’s objective to make solar energy economically viable globally. He became the Assistant Director of Clean Energy and Materials R&D at the White House Office of Science and Technology Policy, serving until 2015. He was involved in the launch of the Materials Genome Initiative, a federal multi-agency program aimed at advancing materials innovation, manufacturing, and collaboration.

=== Innovation in solar technology ===
At the Lawrence Berkeley National Laboratory, Wadia researched the use of abundant materials to synthesize nanocrystals for cost-effective photovoltaics. He then created new solar cell devices that were more cost-effective than conventional silicon-based solar cells.

In 2009, MIT Technology Review included Wadia in its list of Top Innovators under 35 for his work on solar-cell materials. The Review mentioned his analysis of materials with favorable electrical properties and sunlight absorption, highlighting iron pyrite and copper sulfide. Also in 2009, Wadia delivered a talk titled "How to Bring Solar Energy to Seven Billion People" at an event hosted by the Lawrence Berkeley National Laboratory.

Among his published papers, Wadia authored "Materials Availability Expands the Opportunity for Large-Scale Photovoltaics Deployment," a roadmap of low-cost alternatives to conventional materials used in solar cells, for the American Chemical Society publication Environmental Science & Technology in 2009.

In 2013, Wadia received U.S. Patent 8,425,865 for a method of synthesizing pyrite nanocrystals as a potential photovoltaic material.

=== Education and scholarship ===
Wadia holds a Ph.D. in Energy & Resources from U.C. Berkeley, and holds both an M.S. and S.B. in Chemical Engineering from MIT.

Wadia has published 21 peer-reviewed papers.
