= Gilles Rémy =

French businessman and entrepreneur

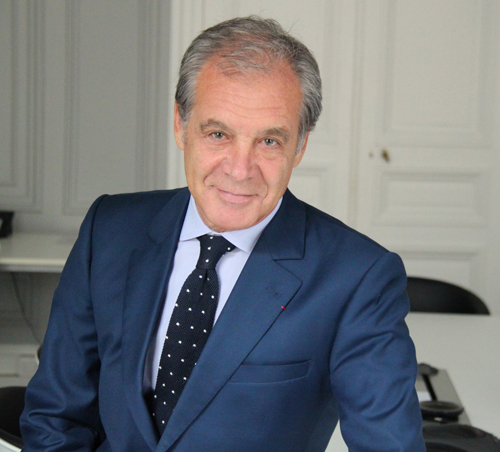

Personal details
- Born: 2 July 1959 (age 67) Audincourt, France
- Education: Law school
- Occupation: Chairman and CEO of several companies

Gilles Rémy is a French businessman, entrepreneur, member of board and chairman of several companies involved in international trade.

== Education ==
Following secondary studies at the Alexandre Dumas high school for Hostelry and Tourism in Strasbourg, Rémy studied at the University of Strasbourg III-Robert Schumann. After completing a Bachelor of Laws in 1981 and a Master of Private Laws in 1982, he obtained a post-graduate DEA degree in Public Laws and a DESS degree in European Business Laws with honors in 1983.

== Career ==
Rémy began his career as a parliamentary assistant. He became the deputy director of the tour operator "France-URSS" in 1985. In this position he traveled throughout the former USSR.

Based in Moscow starting in 1992 with the company CIFAL, he expanded the firm's commercial services business in the oil and nuclear sectors. At the same time, he developed the company throughout Central Asia, setting up representation offices and subsidiaries : Kazakhstan in 1991, Turkmenistan and Azerbaijan in 1993, Kirghizstan in 1995, and Uzbekistan in 2000.

By the end of the 1990s, CIFAL, in which he had become the majority shareholder, a established firm in the Central Asian and Caspian region.

Rémy is shareholder or member of board of international companies based in China (AEC), Middle East (CIS)and Africa (RusAfrika), deputy director of the tour operator France-URSS (1985–1989), Soviet Zone Director at Tibi company (1989–1992), Russia Zone Director at CIFAL Group (1992–1995), since 1995, chairman and CEO of CIFAL Group.

Since 1994, Gilles Rémy has acted as the French foreign trade advisor in charge of the Central Asian/Caucasus region. He is also the Chairman of the French-Turkmen Chamber of Commerce; Founder and Chairman of Rusafrika, which in 2015 became the first business platform dedicated to the development of Russian companies in Africa.

He also founded OSCI, the French federation of international trade agencies, acting as chairman from 2006 to 2013.

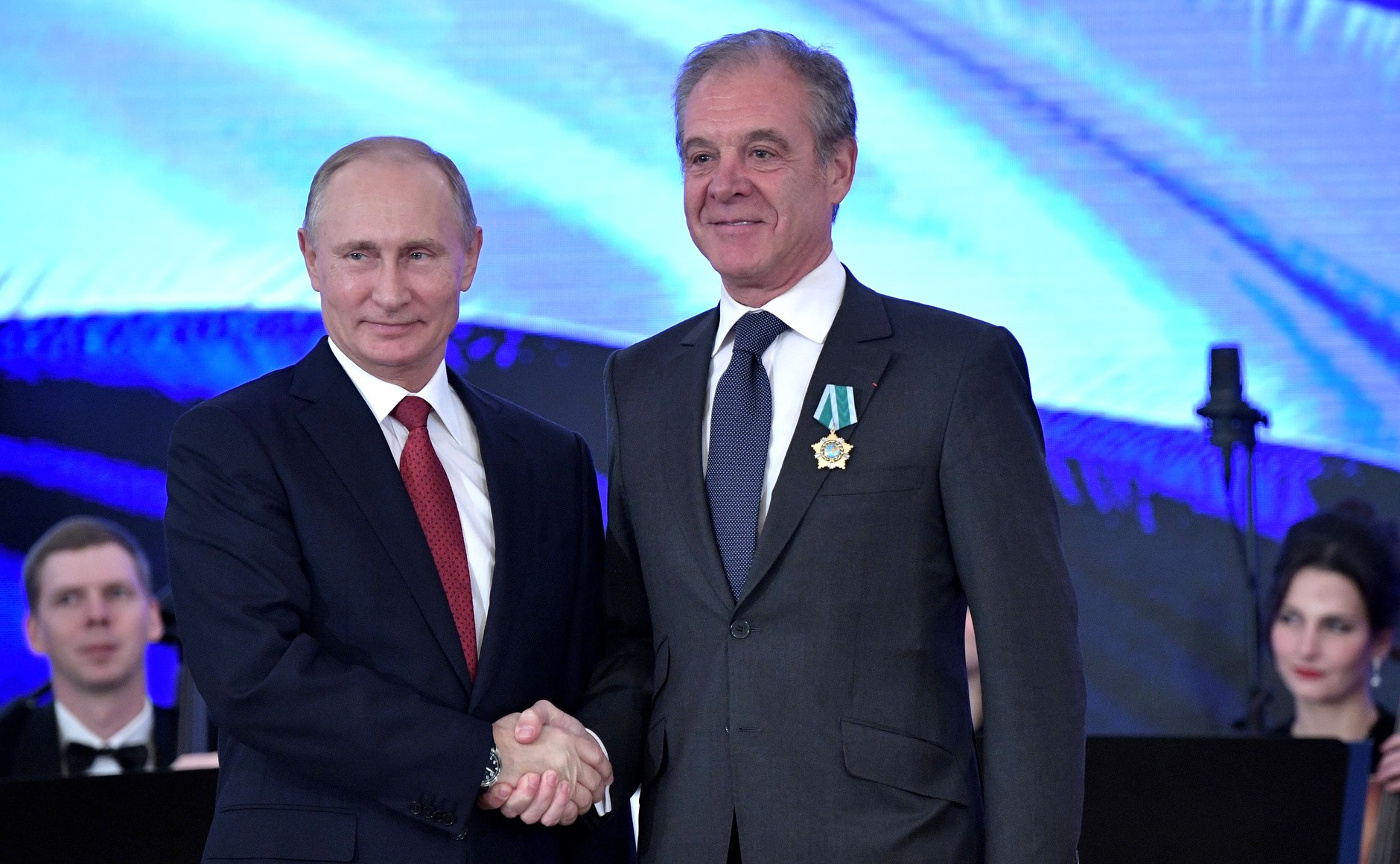
Order of Friendship awarded by Vladimir Putin on 4 November 2017

== Honors ==
- Legion of Honor, Chevalier, France (2010)
- Medal "For the sake of the fatherland", Turkmenistan (1996)
- Medal "Turkmenistan independent, permanent and neutral", Turkmenistan (2015)
- Order of Friendship, Russia (2017) awarded by Vladimir Putin on 4 November 2017.
