= Romen Sova =

Soviet chemist (1938–2001)

- Romen Sova in 1998
- Born: 5 November 1938; Kiev, USSR
- Died: 22 December 2001 (aged 63); Kyiv, Ukraine
- Scientific career
- Fields: Toxicology, Hygiene

Romen Efimovich Sova (Russian: Ромен Ефимович Сова) (5 November 1938 - 22 December 2001), was a Soviet and Ukrainian toxicologist. Corresponding Member of the Ukrainian Ecological Academy of Sciences, Doctor of Medical Sciences.

== Scientific activities ==
From 1965 — Associate Research Fellow of the Kiev Institute of Hygiene and Occupational Diseases, where he received a PhD degree in medical sciences. Since 1971, research activities related to Romain Efimovicha connected with VNIIGINTOKS (now the Institute of ecological hygiene and toxicology behalf L. I. Medved). Over 26 years of work at the institute, he has gone from a research assistant to the deputy director for scientific work. The main focus of his activity was the methodology of integrated assessment of chemical risks to human health and the environment. He took an active part in the development of new directions in toxicology and health - a complex hygienic regulation of pesticides, hygienic regulation of pesticides in soil, application of mathematical methods to assess and predict the real risk of accumulation of pesticides in the environment and the human body. He is coauthor of environmental hygiene and classification of pesticides hazard. As a toxicologist Romen E. Sova has made a significant contribution to the development problems of biological standards of laboratory animals, the methodology and methods of studying the combined, integrated and combined effects of chemicals and other factors. Romain Yefimovich established the All-Union Center "Dioxin", commenced research on this problem, developed the first hygienic standards of the most dangerous environmental pollutants. He was an expert of WHO on the issue of dioxin, an expert from Ukraine on the issue of persistent organic pollutants in the United Nations Environment Programme, a member of the committee on the hygienic regulation of MH of Ukraine. Romen Yefimovich prepared 5 Candidates of Medical Sciences, published 6 monographs and more than 230 scientific papers.

== Publications ==
- Трахтенберг И. М., Сова Р. Е., Шефтель В. О., Оникиенко Ф. А. Проблема нормы в токсикологии. — М.: Медицина, 1991
- Дышиневич Н. Е., Сова Р. Е. Полимерные строительные материалы и синдром «больного здания». —Киев: Наукова думка, 1998. —С. 247,254.1
- Сова Р. Е. Использование полимерных материалов в водоснабжении. Проблемы безопасности / Р. Е. Сова, В. Г. Герасимова, А. В. Головащенко // Коммунальное хозяйство городов. — 2001. — Вып. 29. — С. 129–130.
