= Remington, Virginia =

- Town
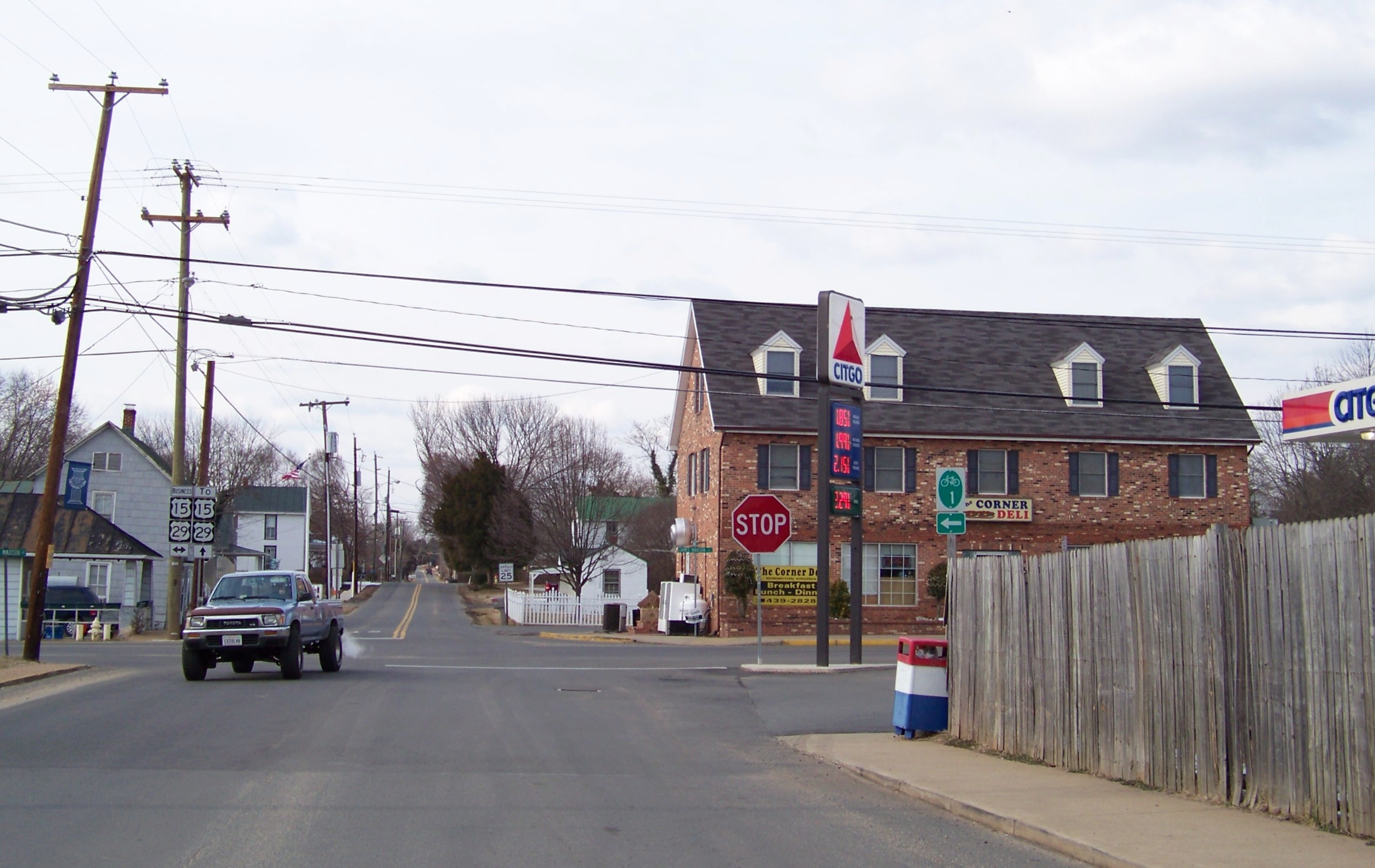
- Central Remington (2007)

- Seal

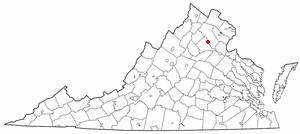
- Location of Remington, Virginia
- Coordinates: 38°32′8″N 77°48′29″W
- Country: United States
- State: Virginia
- County: Fauquier

Area
  - Total: 0.22 sq mi (0.57 km^{2})
  - Land: 0.22 sq mi (0.57 km^{2})
  - Water: 0 sq mi (0.00 km^{2})
- Elevation: 272 ft (83 m)

Population (2020)
  - Total: 626
  - Estimate (2019): 658
  - Density: 3,002.5/sq mi (1,159.28/km^{2})
- Time zone: UTC−5 (Eastern (EST))
  - Summer (DST): UTC−4 (EDT)
- ZIP code: 22734
- Area code: 540
- FIPS code: 51-66512
- GNIS feature ID: 1499948
- Website: www.remington-va.gov

Remington is a town in Fauquier County, Virginia, United States. As of the 2020 census, Remington had a population of 626. It is near the highways, U.S. Route 15, U.S. Route 17, U.S. Route 29, and Virginia State Route 28. Remington is less than a mile northeast of the Culpeper County line.

== History ==
The Remington Historic District was listed on the National Register of Historic Places in 2005.

The town developed as a transportation hub. It was a commercial port during the mid-nineteenth century on the Rappahannock Canal, but the canal failed financially, and operations were abandoned. Later, the town was a stop on the Orange and Alexandria Railroad called Rappahannock Station, but the O&A was eventually absorbed into the Norfolk Southern system, and the Remington spur fell into disuse.

Remington was the site of the First Battle of Rappahannock Station and the Second Battle of Rappahannock Station during the American Civil War. The Battle of Brandy Station was fought just across the Rappahannock River. Colonel John S. Mosby made raids in the town during the war. Later, Mosby made his home and practiced law in nearby Warrenton.

From 1985 to mid-2020, the town was among the last municipalities still using a Confederate battle flag in its official seal. A variation of the seal, Confederate flag included, appeared on their police uniform shoulder patches. The Remington town council voted to remove the Confederate flag from its seal on July 20, 2020.

== Geography ==
Remington is located at 38°32′8″N 77°48′29″W (38.535464, −77.808117).

According to the United States Census Bureau, the town has a total area of 0.2 square miles (0.6 km^{2}), all land.

== Demographics ==
Historical population
Census	Pop.	Note	%±
1900	198		—
1910	251		26.8%
1920	267		6.4%
1930	273		2.2%
1940	226		−17.2%
1950	309		36.7%
1960	288		−6.8%
1970	321		11.5%
1980	425		32.4%
1990	460		8.2%
2000	624		35.7%
2010	598		−4.2%
2020	626		4.7%
2023 (est.)	646	▲	3.2%
U.S. Decennial Census

At the 2010 census there were 598 people, 238 households, and 163 families in the town. The population density was 2,876.4 people per square mile (1,095.1/km^{2}). There were 255 housing units at an average density of 1,175.5 per square mile (447.5/km^{2}). The racial makeup of the town was 74.41% White, 17.56% African American, 0.17% Native American, 0.67% Asian, 4.35% from other races, and 2.84% from two or more races. Hispanic or Latino of any race were 6.19%.

Of the 238 households 36.1% had children under the age of 18 living with them, 41.6% were married couples living together, 19.3% had a female householder with no husband present, and 31.5% were non-families. 23.5% of households were one person and 7.1% were one person aged 65 or older. The average household size was 2.60 and the average family size was 3.02.

The age distribution was 27.9% under the age of 18, 10.3% from 18 to 24, 34.6% from 25 to 44, 20.4% from 45 to 64, and 6.9% 65 or older. The median age was 33 years. For every 100 females, there were 85.2 males. For every 100 females aged 18 and over, there were 87.5 males.

The median household income was $36,765 and the median family income was $37,969. Males had a median income of $31,250 versus $20,750 for females. The per capita income for the town was $16,693. About 11.0% of families and 13.6% of the population were below the poverty line, including 21.0% of those under age 18 and 12.5% of those age 65 or over.

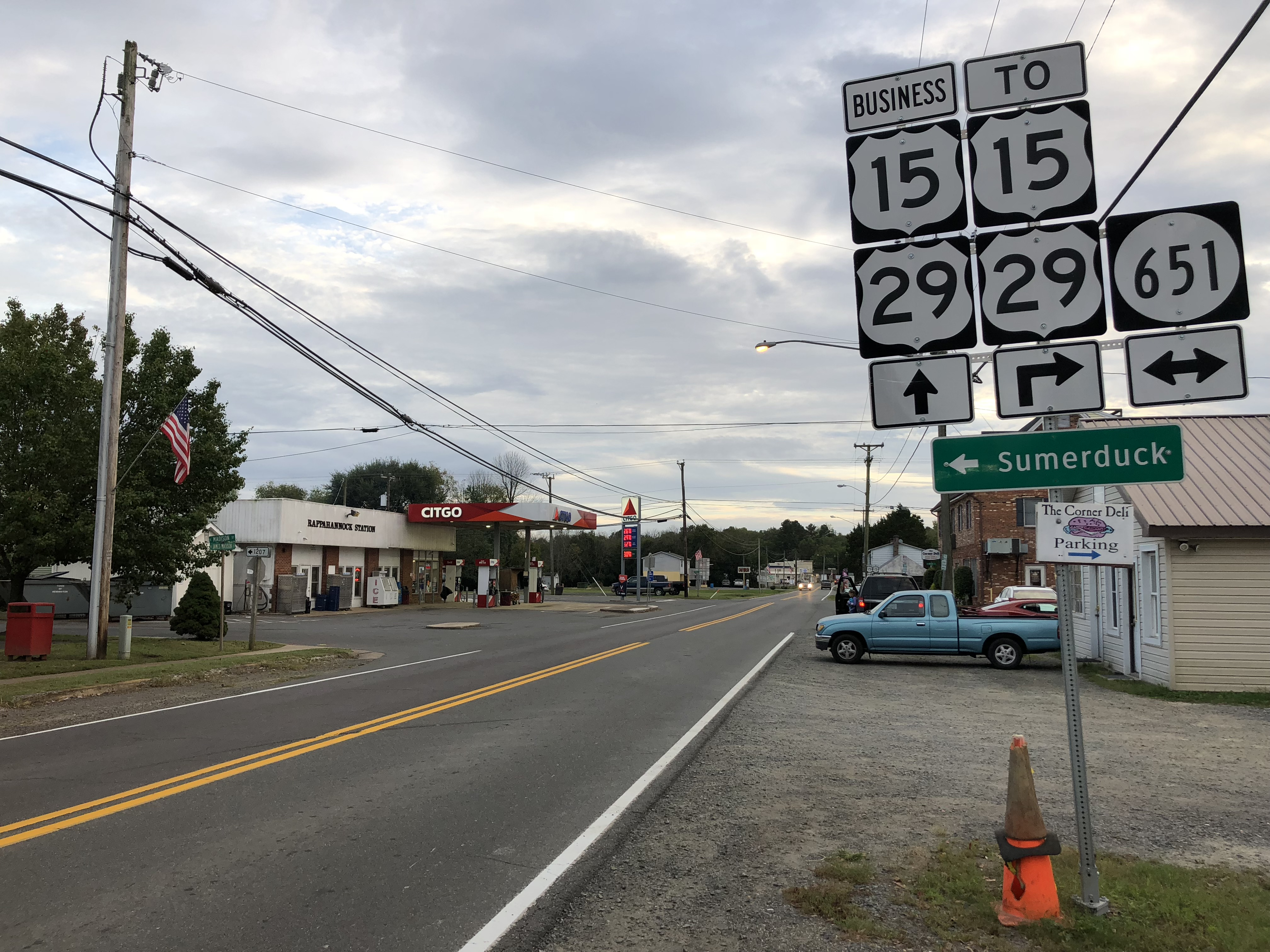
View south along US 15 Bus/US 29 Bus in Remington

== Transportation ==
U.S. Route 15 and U.S. Route 29 are the main roadways to the Remington area. Direct access to downtown Remington is provided via U.S. Route 15 Business and U.S. Route 29 Business. Additional local roads provide access to adjacent unincorporated portions of Fauquier County.

== Notable people ==
- Jud "Boojum" Wilson, Negro League baseball player and manager; member, Baseball Hall of Fame
