= Rémy Vincent Andrianjanaka =

Malagasy politician (born 1952)

Rémy Vincent Andrianjanaka (born October 6, 1952 in Ampasinambo) is a Malagasy politician. A former member of the Senate of Madagascar for Vatovavy Fitovinany, he is a member of the Tiako I Madagasikara party. As of 2019, he was head of the Vatovavy Fitovinany region.
