= Comey (surname) =

Family name

Comey is a surname of Welsh origin. Notable people with the surname include:

- James Comey (born 1960), American director of the FBI, 2013–2017
- Maurene Comey (born 1988), American former federal prosecutor
- Rachel Comey, American fashion designer
- Robin Comey (born 1967), American politician
- Stephen Comey (born 1963), British-Australian actor
