= Remigius =

Remigius may refer to:

- Saint Remigius (c. 437–533), bishop of Reims; converted Clovis I, king of the Franks
- Remigius of Rouen (755–771), archbishop of Rouen and illegitimate son of Charles Martel
- Remigius of Strasbourg (died 783), bishop of Strasbourg
- Remigius of Lyon (died 875), archbishop of Lyon
- Remigius of Auxerre (c. 841–908), theologian and teacher
- Remigius de Fécamp (died 1092), bishop of Lincoln from 1072

== See also ==
- Rémy (name), modern French form of the name
