= Rémi Siméon =

Rémi Siméon (1 October 1827 in Lurs, Alpes-de-Haute-Provence department, France – 23 November 1890 in Paris, France) was a French lexicographer. Siméon was the author of a dictionary of the Nahuatl language. In 1886, he was elected as a member of the American Philosophical Society.
