= Gabriel Msipu Phiri =

Zambian Roman Catholic prelate

The Most Reverend Gabriel Msipu Phiri
- Auxiliary Bishop of Chipata
- Church: Roman Catholic Church
- Archdiocese: Lusaka
- See: Lusaka
- Appointed: 10 December 2022
- Installed: 11 February 2023

Orders
- Ordination: 15 September 1991
- Consecration: 11 February 2023 by Bishop George Cosmas Zumaire Lungu, Bishop of Chipata
- Rank: Bishop

Personal details
- Born: Gabriel Msipu Phiri; 13 July 1964 (age 61); Vubwi, Diocese of Chipata, Zambia

Styles of Gabriel Msipu Phiri
- Reference style
- Religious style: Bishop

Gabriel Msipu Phiri (born 13 July 1964) is a Zambian Catholic prelate who serves as Auxiliary Bishop of Chipata. He was appointed by Pope Francis on 10 December 2022.

== Early life and education ==
Phiri was born on 13 July 1964 in Vubwi District, in the Diocese of Chipata in the Eastern Province of Zambia. He completed secondary school in 1984. In 1985 he entered St. Augustine's Major Seminary in Mpima, Kabwe District, where he graduated with Diploma in Philosophy. Later, he studied at St. Dominic's Major Seminary in Lusaka for pastoral and theological studies. He also holds a "Certificate in Spiritual Leadership" obtained from the Institute for Spiritual Leadership in Chicago, Illinois, United States, in 2002. In addition, he studied at St. Augustine University of Tanzania (SAUT), Mwanza from 2005 until 2008, graduating with a Bachelor of Business Administration degree.

== Priesthood ==
He was ordained a priest on 15 September 1991 at Chipata. He served as a priest in the Diocese of Chipata, until 10 December 2022. He served in various pastoral offices both inside the diocese and at national level, including as Diocesan Vicar General, Diocesan Treasurer General and Human Resources Officer. He also was the Dean for St. Anne's Cathedral in Chipata Diocese and he served as the "Finance and Administration Manager" at the Catholic Secretariat of the Zambia Conference of Catholic Bishops, in Lusaka.

== Episcopal career ==
He was appointed as Auxiliary Bishop of Chipata by Pope Francis, on 10 December 2022 and was installed there on 11 February 2023, assuming the title of Titular Bishop of Arae in Mauretania. He was consecrated as bishop by Bishop George Cosmas Zumaire Lungu, Bishop of Chipata, assisted by Evans Chinyama Chinyemba, O.M.I., Bishop of Mongu, Zambia and Clement Mulenga, S.D.B., Bishop of Kabwe, Zambia.

== See also ==
- Roman Catholicism in Zambia
