= Association of Member Episcopal Conferences in Eastern Africa =

Catholic organization (since 1961)

The Association of Member Episcopal Conferences in Eastern Africa (AMECEA) is the association of episcopal conferences of Eastern Africa and the coordinating body of the Catholic dioceses. The AMECEA was established in 1961, with Cardinal Adam Kozlowiecki, SJ, Archbishop of Lusaka, its founding president. It is one of ten members of the Symposium of Episcopal Conferences of Africa and Madagascar (SECAM).

== Headquarters ==
The headquarters and secretariat of AMECEA are located in Nairobi, Kenya's capital city.

== Member conferences ==
Members of the AMECEA include the episcopal conferences of Ethiopia (1979), Eritrea (1993), Kenya (1961), Malawi (1961), Tanzania (1961), Zambia (1961), Sudan/South Sudan (1979), Uganda (1961). Somalia (1995) and Djibouti (2002) have observer status.

== Departments ==
As of 2018, AMECEA maintained the following administrative departments:

- AMECEA Pastoral Department
- AMECEA Social Communications Department
- AMECEA Integral Human Development Department
- AMECEA Staffing Committee.

== Honorary members ==
- Cardinal Polycarp Pengo, Tanzania
- Cardinal Emmanuel Wamala, Uganda
- Cardinal Gabriel Zubeir Wako, Sudan
- Cardinal John Njue, Kenya

== Members ==
- Bishop Martin Anwel Mtumbuka, Bishop of Karonga, Malawi
- Bishop Thomas Osman, Eparch of Barentu, Eritrea
- Bishop Seyoum Fransua Noel, Bishop of Hossana, Ethiopia
- Bishop Mark Kadima Wamukoya, Bishop of Bungoma, Kenya
- Archbishop Anthony Muheria, Archbishop of Nyeri, Kenya
- Archbishop Michael Didi Adgum, Archbishop of Khartoum Sudan
- Bishop Rogatus Kimaryo, Bishop of Same, Tanzania
- Bishop Joseph Anthony Zziwa, Bishop of Kiyinda-Mityana, Uganda
- Bishop Evans Chinyama Chinyemba, Bishop of Mongu, Zambia
- Priest Anthony Makunde, Secretary General

== Chairmen ==
The current chairman is Most Reverend Charles Joseph Sampa Kasonde, since 21 July 2018.

- Adam Kozłowiecki, Archbishop of Roman Catholic Archdiocese of Lusaka (1961-1964)
- Vincent J. McCauley, C.S.C., Bishop of Roman Catholic Diocese of Fort Portal (1964-1973)
- James Odongo, Archbishop of the Roman Catholic Archdiocese of Tororo (1973-1979)
- Medardo Joseph Mazombwe, Bishop of the Roman Catholic Diocese of Chipata (1979-1985)
- Dennis Harold De Jong, Bishop of the Roman Catholic Diocese of Ndola (1986-1989)
- Nicodemus Kirima, Archbishop of the Roman Catholic Archdiocese of Nyeri (1989-1995)
- Josaphat Louis Lebulu, Archbishop of the Roman Catholic Archdiocese of Arusha (1995-2002)
- Paul Kamuza Bakyenga, Archbishop of the Roman Catholic Archdiocese of Mbarara (2002-2008)
- Tarcisius Gervazio Ziyaye, Archbishop of the Roman Catholic Archdiocese of Lilongwe (2008 - 2014)
- Berhaneyesus Demerew Souraphiel, C.M. Archbishop of Roman Catholic Archdiocese of Addis Ababa (Ethiopia) (2014 - 2018)
- Charles Joseph Sampa Kasonde, Bishop of Roman Catholic Diocese of Solwezi, since 2018.

== See also ==
- Catholic Church in Africa
