= Clement Mulenga =

Zambian Roman Catholic prelate

Clement Mulenga, S.D.B.
- Bishop
- Church: Catholic Church
- Archdiocese: Kabwe
- Appointed: 29 October 2011
- Predecessor: None
- Successor: Incumbent

Orders
- Ordination: 25 August 1998
- Consecration: 17 December 2011 by Telesphore George Mpundu
- Rank: Bishop

Personal details
- Born: Clement Mulenga; 15 August 1965 (age 59); Dismashi, Archdiocese of Kasana, Zambia

Styles of Clement Mulenga
- Reference style: His Grace; The Most Reverend
- Spoken style: Your Grace
- Religious style: Archbishop

Clement Mulenga (born 15 August 1965) is a Zambian Catholic prelate who is the Bishop of the Diocese of Kabwe. He was appointed Bishop of Kabwe on 29 October 2011 by Pope Benedict XVI.

== Background and education ==
He was born on 15 August 1965, in the village of Dismashi in the Archdiocese of Kasama, Zambia. He attended primary school and middle school in his home area. He completed high school in Luwingu, Luwingu District, in the Northern Province of Zambia. While there, he joined the Salesian Society of St. John Bosco. From 2001 until 2004 he studied at the Pontifical Salesian University, in Rome, graduating with a Licentiate in Youth Ministry and Catechesis.

== Priesthood ==
He took his perpetual vows as a Salesian of Don Bosco on 25 August 1996, in Nairobi, Kenya. He was ordained a priest on 25 August 1998. He served as a priest of Salesians of Saint John Bosco until 29 October 2011.

While he was priest he held the following offices:

- Parish Vicar of Bauleni Parish in Lusaka, from 1998 until 2001
- Superior of the Salesian Community of Chingola in Zambia, from 2005 until 2007
- Councillor and Delegate for Formation, from 2007 until 2009
- Vicar, formator and professor of the Post-Novice Community of Moshi in Tanzania. * Director of the Office for Youth Pastoral Care of the Archdiocese of Lusaka, from 2009 until 2011.

== As bishop ==
On 29 October 2011 Pope Benedict XVI created the Roman Catholic Diocese of Kabwe out of the Roman Catholic Diocese of Mpika and the Archdiocese of Lusaka, making it a suffragan of the metropolitan church of Lusaka. On the same day, the Pope appointed Father Clement Mulenga as the pioneer bishop to lead the new diocese. Father Mulenga received episcopal consecration on 17 December 2011 at the hands of Archbishop Telesphore George Mpundu, Archbishop of Lusaka, assisted by Cardinal Medardo Joseph Mazombwe, Archbishop Emeritus of Lusaka and Bishop Ignatius Chama, Bishop of Mpika.

In 2018, Bishop Mulenga served as the chairman of the National Pastoral Commission for the Zambia Conference of Catholic Bishops (ZCCB).

== See also ==
- Edwin Mwansa Mulandu
- Catholicism in Zambia

== Succession table ==
Catholic Church titles
Preceded by None (Diocese created)	Bishop of Diocese of Kabwe; Since 17 December 2011	Succeeded by Incumbent
