= Noel Charles O'Regan =

Irish Roman Catholic prelate

Noel Charles O’Regan
- Bishop Emeritus of Ndola
- Church: Catholic Church
- Archdiocese: Roman Catholic Archdiocese of Lusaka
- See: Roman Catholic Diocese of Ndola
- Appointed: 1 October 2004
- Term ended: 16 January 2010
- Predecessor: Dennis Harold De Jong
- Successor: Alick Banda
- Other post(s): Bishop of Diocese of Solwezi (1995 - 2004)

Orders
- Ordination: 18 December 1967
- Consecration: 10 December 1995 by Giuseppe Leanza
- Rank: Bishop

Personal details
- Born: Noel Charles O'Regan; 14 December 1941 (age 83); Bishopstown, Munster Province, Republic of Ireland

Styles of Noel Charles O'Regan, SMA
- Reference style: His Grace; The Most Reverend
- Spoken style: Your Grace
- Religious style: Bishop

Noel Charles O’Regan (born 14 December 1941) is an Irish Catholic prelate who was the Bishop of the Diocese of Ndola, in Zambia. He was appointed Bishop of Ndola on 1 October 2004 by Pope John Paul II. He resigned as bishop on 16 January 2010.

== Beginning and education ==
He was born on 14 December 1941 in Bishopstown, Munster Province, in the Republic of Ireland, on 14 December 1941. He graduated from the University College Cork in 1964. In 1967, he became a permeant member of the Society of African Missions.

== Priest ==
He was ordained a priest on 18 December 1967 at Newry, County Down, in Northern Ireland. He went to Zambia as a missionary of the Society of African Missions. He was assigned to the Catholic Diocese of Solwezi.

== Bishop ==
On 10 July 1995, Pope John Paul II appointed him the Bishop of Solwezi, Zambia. He was consecrated and installed on 10 December 1995 by Archbishop Giuseppe Leanza, Titular Archbishop of Lilybaeum, assisted by Bishop Dennis Harold De Jong, Bishop of Ndola and Bishop Telesphore George Mpundu, Bishop of Mpika.

On 1 October 2004, Pope John Paul II appointed him Bishop of Ndola, Zambia. He was installed there on 13 November 2004, by Archbishop Orlando Antonini, the Pro-Nuncio to Zambia. Bishop O'Regan continued on as Apostolic Administrator of Solwezi Diocese until a successor was named.

On 16 January 2010, Pope Benedict XVI accepted the resignation tendered by Bishop Noel Charles O'Regan, SMA of the Diocese of Ndola. The Holy Father named as successor, Bishop Alick Banda, the Coadjutor Bishop of the same diocese. Bishop O'Regan continued on as Bishop Emeritus of the Diocese of Ndola.

== See also ==
- Edwin Mwansa Mulandu
- Catholicism in Zambia

== Succession table ==
Catholic Church titles
Preceded by Dennis Harold De Jong (1975 - 2003)	Bishop of Diocese of Ndola; 2004 - 2010	Succeeded by Alick Banda (2010 - 2018)
Preceded by Severinah Abdon Potani (1976 - 1993)	Bishop of Diocese of Solwezi; 1995 - 2004	Succeeded by Alick Banda (2007 - 2009)
