= Severinah Abdon Potani =

Zambian Roman Catholic prelate

The Most Reverend Severinah Abdon Potani
- Bishop of Solwezi
- Church: Catholic Church
- Archdiocese: Roman Catholic Archdiocese of Ndola
- See: Roman Catholic Diocese of Solwezi
- Appointed: 9 December 1976
- Term ended: 26 December 1993
- Predecessor: Rupert Gilbert Paul Hillerich
- Successor: Noel Charles O'Regan
- Other post(s): Apostolic Administrator of Solwezi (1970 - 1977)

Orders
- Ordination: 17 August 1949
- Consecration: 20 February 1977 by Luciano Angeloni
- Rank: Bishop

Personal details
- Born: Severinah Abdon Potani; 30 June 1919; Petauke, Petauke District, Eastern Province, Zambia
- Died: 26 December 1993 (aged 74); Solwezi, Zambia

Styles of Severinah Abdon Potani
- Reference style: His Grace; The Most Reverend
- Spoken style: Your Grace
- Religious style: Bishop

Severinah Abdon Potani (30 June 1919 - 26 December 1993) was a Zambian Catholic prelate who was the Bishop of the Diocese of Solwezi. He was appointed Bishop of Solwezi on 9 December 1976 by Pope Paul VI. Bishop Potani died on 26 December 1993 as Bishop of Solwezi, Zambia at the age of 74.4 years.

== Background and education ==
He was born on 30 June 1919, in the town of Petauke, Eastern Province of Northern Rhodesia (now Zambia). He attended primary school and secondary school in his home area. He joined the Order of Friars Minor Conventual (OFM Conv.) before he was ordained priest.

== Priesthood ==
He was ordained a priest on 17 August 1949. While he was priest he was appointed as Apostolic Administrator of the vacant Apostolic Prefecture of Solwezi on 9 June 1970 by Pope Paul VI. Father Potani maintained that apostolic administratorship until he was appointed bishop of the same diocese 6.5 years later.

== As bishop ==
On 9 December 1976 Pope Paul VI appointed Father Severinah Abdon Potani, OFM Conv. as Bishop of the Diocese of Solwezi, which he elevated from the Apostolic Prefecture of Solwezi on the same day.

He was consecrated bishop and installed on 20 February 1977 at Solwezi, Zambia. The Principal Consecrator was Archbishop Luciano Angeloni, Titular Archbishop of Vibo assisted by Bishop Francesco Costantino Mazzieri, Bishop Emeritus of Ndola and Bishop Medardo Joseph Mazombwe, Bishop of Chipata. Bishop Severinah Abdon Potani of the Diocese of Solwezi died on 26 December 1993.

== See also ==
- Edwin Mwansa Mulandu
- Catholicism in Zambia

== Succession table ==
Catholic Church titles
Preceded by Rupert Gilbert Paul Hillerich (1959 - 1969)	Bishop of Diocese of Solwezi (1976 - 1993)	Succeeded by Noel Charles O'Regan (1995 - 2004)
