= Dennis Harold De Jong =

Zambian Roman Catholic prelate

- Bishop
- Church: Catholic Church
- Archdiocese: Roman Catholic Archdiocese of Lusaka
- See: Roman Catholic Diocese of Ndola
- Appointed: 10 July 1975
- Term ended: 17 September 2003
- Predecessor: Nicola Agnozzi
- Successor: Noel Charles O'Regan
- Other post(s): None

Orders
- Ordination: 20 December 1958
- Consecration: 28 September 1975 by Luciano Angeloni
- Rank: Bishop

Personal details
- Born: Dennis Harold De Jong; 2 May 1931; Chipata, Chipata District, Zambia
- Died: 17 September 2003 (aged 72); Ndola, Zambia

Styles of Dennis Harold De Jong
- Reference style: His Lordship; Right Reverend
- Spoken style: Your Lordship
- Religious style: Bishop

Dennis Harold De Jong (2 May 1931 - 17 September 2003) was a Zambian Catholic prelate who was the Bishop of the Diocese of Ndola, in Zambia. He was appointed Bishop of Ndola on 10 July 1975 by Pope Paul VI. He died as bishop on 17 September 2003 at Ndola.

== Beginning and education ==
He was born on 2 May 1931 in Chipata Chipata District, in the Eastern Province, of Zambia. He attended primary school in Chipata and secondary school in Harare, (formerly Salisbury), in Zimbabwe. From 1952 until 1958, he studied for priesthood in Rome, Italy. He held a master's degree in Philosophy and Sacred Theology. He also obtained a Diploma in Education obtained from an institution in London, United Kingdom in 1960.

== Priest ==
He was ordained a priest on 20 December 1958 in Rome, Italy. When he returned to Zambia in 1960, he was appointed lecturer and later rector of Francisdale Minor Seminary in Ndola, serving there until he was appointed bishop in July 1975.

== Bishop ==
On 10 July 1975, Pope Paul VI appointed him the Bishop of Ndola, Zambia. He was consecrated and installed on 28 September 1975 by Archbishop Luciano Angeloni, Titular Archbishop of Vibo, assisted by Bishop Medardo Joseph Mazombwe, Bishop of Chipata and Bishop Nicola Agnozzi, Bishop Emeritus of Ndola. He served as the fifth chairman of the Association of Member Episcopal Conferences in Eastern Africa (AMECEA) from 1986 until 1989.

Bishop Dennis Harold De Jong died at Ndola on 17 September 2003.

== See also ==
- Edwin Mwansa Mulandu
- Catholicism in Zambia

== Succession table ==
Catholic Church titles
Preceded by Nicola Agnozzi, OFM Conv. (1966 - 1975)	Bishop of Diocese of Ndola; 1975 - 2003	Succeeded by Noel Charles O'Regan, SMA (2004 - 2010)
