= Charles Kasonde =

Zambian Roman Catholic prelate

The Most Reverend Charles Kasonde
- Bishop of Solwezi, Zambia
- Church: Roman Catholic Church
- Archdiocese: Roman Catholic Archdiocese of Ndola
- See: Roman Catholic Diocese of Solwezi
- Appointed: 23 March 2010
- Predecessor: Alick Banda
- Successor: Incumbent

Orders
- Ordination: 4 August 2001
- Consecration: 29 May 2010 by Nicola Girasoli
- Rank: Bishop

Personal details
- Born: Charles Kasonde; 14 December 1968 (age 57) Kalulushi, Copperbelt Province, Zambia
- Motto: "Evangelizatio integra populi Dei" (The evangelization of the whole people of God)

Styles of Charles Kasonde
- Reference style: Your Lordships: The Most Reverend
- Spoken style: His Lordship
- Religious style: Archbishop

Charles Joseph Sampa Kasonde is a Roman Catholic prelate, who is the Bishop of the Roman Catholic Diocese of Solwezi, in Zambia. He was appointed to that position on 23 March 2010 by Pope Benedict XVI.

== Early life and education ==
He was born in Kalulushi, Kalulushi District, in the Copperbelt Province of Zambia on 14 December 1968. After primary and secondary school, he studied at the "St. Augustine National Philosophical Seminary" in Mpima, Zambia from 1991 until 1994 and then at the "St. Dominic Major Theological Seminary" in Lusaka from 1994 until 1998. From 2006 until 2008, he studied at a religious institution in the city of Baltimore, Maryland, United States. He graduated from there with a Licentiate (equivalent to a Master's degree) in Dogmatic Theology and Pastoral Theology.

== Priesthood ==
He was ordained a deacon in 1998. On 4 August 2001 he was ordained a priest for the Diocese of Ndola. He worked in various roles while a priest of Ndola including:

- Parish priest of St. Joseph's Parish and director of the Diocesan Pastoral Office from 2001 until 2004
- Director of the Pastoral Office at the Zambian Episcopal Conference in Lusaka from 2004 until 2006.
- Director of the National Pastoral Office at the Zambian Episcopal Conference
- Deputy General Secretary of the Zambian Episcopal Conference.

== As bishop ==
Pope Benedict XVI appointed him Bishop of Solwezi on 23 March 2010. He was consecrated as bishop on 29 May 2010, by Archbishop Nicola Girasoli, Titular Archbishop of Egnazia Appula and Papal Nuncio, assisted by Bishop Alick Banda, Bishop of Ndola and Bishop George Cosmas Zumaire Lungu, Bishop of Chipata.

In May 2023, Bishop Kasonde celebrated thirteen years of episcopal service with the Catholic faithful in the Diocese of Solwezi. At that time he was the President of the Association of Member Episcopal Conferences in Eastern Africa (AMECEA), headquartered in Nairobi, Kenya. The Catholic prelate is the 4th bishop of the diocese since it was elevated to the level of Diocese on 9 December 1976 by Pope Saint Paul VI.

== See also ==
- Roman Catholicism in Zambia

== Succession table ==
Preceded by Alick Banda (2007–2009)	Bishop of Solwezi; 2010 – present	Succeeded by Incumbent
