= Benjamin S. Phiri =

Zambian Roman Catholic prelate

The Most Reverend Benjamin S. Phiri
- Archbishop of Ndola
- Church: Roman Catholic Church
- Archdiocese: Ndola
- See: Ndola
- Appointed: 18 June 2024
- Installed: 18 June 2024
- Predecessor: None
- Previous posts: Bishop of Ndola (2020–2024); Auxiliary Bishop of Chipata (2011–2020)

Orders
- Ordination: 14 September 1986
- Consecration: 9 April 2011 by Cardinal Medardo Joseph Mazombwe
- Rank: Archbishop

Personal details
- Born: Benjamin S. Phiri; 14 June 1959 (age 67) Chongololo, Diocese of Chipata, Zambia
- Motto: "Unum simus per crucem" (May we be one through the cross)

Styles of Paul Ssemogerere
- Reference style: [[ ]]
- Religious style: Archbishop

Benjamin S. Phiri (born 14 June 1959) is a Zambian Catholic prelate who serves as Archbishop of Ndola. He was appointed by Pope Francis on 18 June 2024, the same day that the Diocese of Ndola was elevated to an Archdiocese.

Previously, he was the Bishop of Ndola, under the Roman Catholic Archdiocese of Lusaka. He was appointed there on 3 July 2020 and was installed at Ndola on 15 August 2020.

== Early life and education ==
Phiri was born on 14 June 1959 at Chongololo, in the Diocese of Chipata in the Eastern Province of Zambia. He studied at the Minor Seminary in Monze Diocese. He then studied philosophy at St. Augustine Seminary, Kabwe, and then theology at St. Dominic's Major Seminary, Lusaka.

== Priesthood ==
He was ordained a priest on 14 September 1986 at Chipata. He served as a priest in the Diocese of Chipata, until 15 January 2011. Among his assignments after ordination, he served as director of vocations, parish priest, and director of Chikungu Pastoral Centre in Chipata Diocese. Later he served as the national director of the Pastoral Office of the Zambian Bishops' Conference, from 2002 until 2004. Then as rector of St. Dominic's Major Seminary in Lusaka from 2004.

== Episcopal career ==
He was appointed as Auxiliary Bishop of Chipata by Pope Benedict XVI, on 15 January 2011 and was installed there on 9 April 2011 as the titular see of Nachingwea. He was consecrated as bishop by Cardinal Medardo Joseph Mazombwe, Archbishop Emeritus of Lusaka, assisted by Archbishop Nicola Girasoli, Titular Archbishop of Egnazia Appula, the Papal Nuncio and by Bishop George Cosmas Zumaire Lungu, Bishop of Chipata. Bishop Phiri served in Chipata until 3 July 2020.

=== Archbishop ===
On 18 June 2024, the Diocese of Ndola was elevated to the status of Archdiocese by Pope Francis. The sitting Ordinary, Bishop Benjamin S. Phiri was elevated to Archbishop and given more responsibilities. The newly established Ecclesiastical Province of Ndola has the Dioceses of Kabwe and Solwezi as suffragan Dioceses. Following those changes, there are three Ecclesiastical Provinces in Zambia, each led by an archbishop; one in Lusaka, another in Kasama and the third in Ndola.

== See also ==
- Roman Catholicism in Zambia

== Succession table ==
Catholic Church titles
Preceded by None (Before June 2024)	Archbishop of Archdiocese of Ndola; 2024 - present	Succeeded by Incumbent
Preceded by Alick Banda (2010 -2018 )	Bishop of Diocese of Ndola; 2020 - 2024	Succeeded by Elevated to Archdiocese
