= Emmanuel Milingo =

Excommunicated Zambian bishop (born 1930)

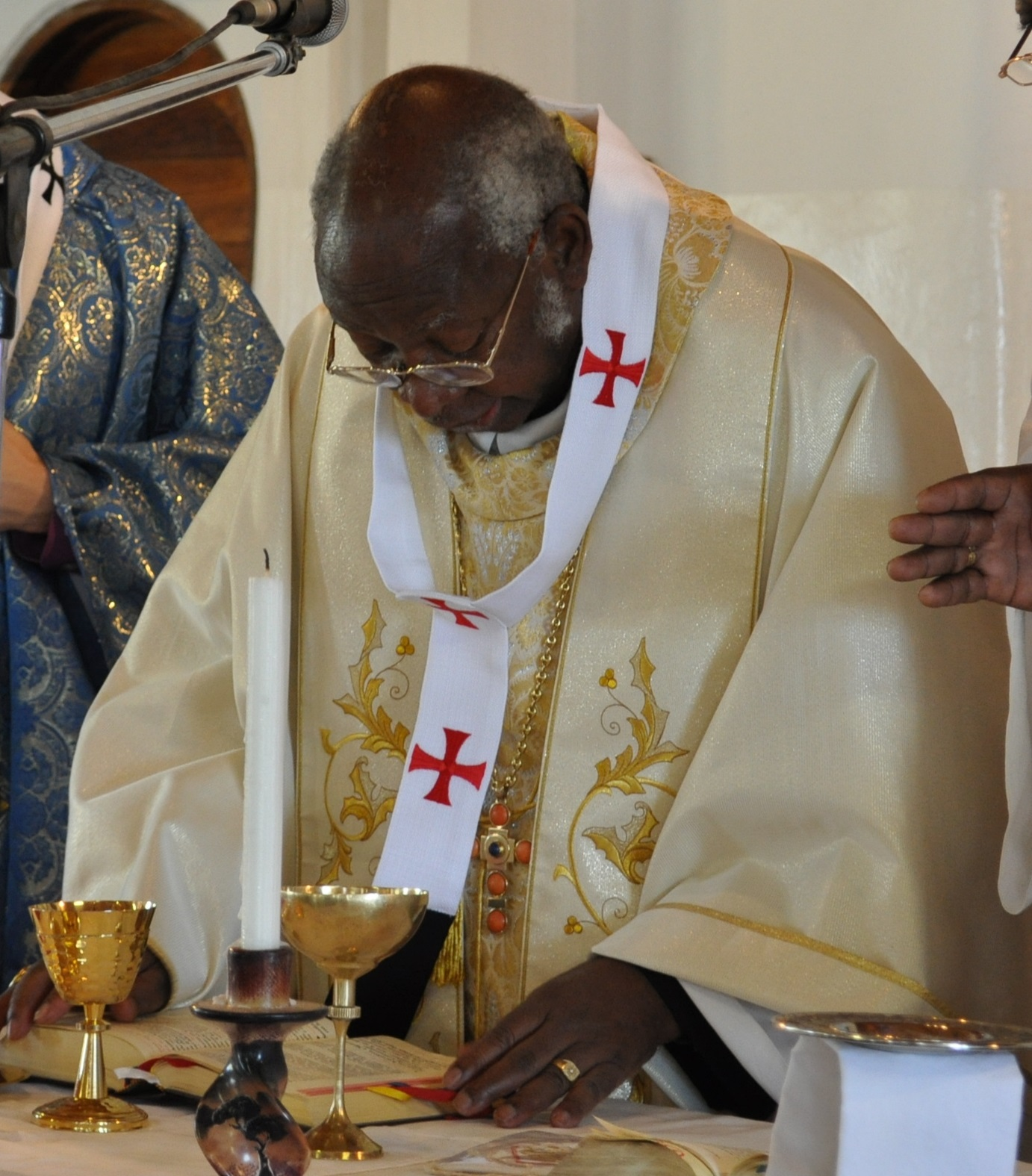
- Church: Roman Catholic Church (excommunicated)
- Archdiocese: Lusaka
- In office: 1969 to 1983
- Predecessor: Adam Kozłowiecki
- Successor: Adrian Mung'andu

Orders
- Ordination: August 31, 1958
- Consecration: August 1, 1969 by Pope Paul VI
- Laicized: December 17, 2009

Personal details
- Born: 13 June 1930 (age 96) Mnukwa, Northern Rhodesia (now Zambia)
- Spouse: Maria Sung (m. 2001)

Ordination history
History
Priestly ordination
- Date: August 31, 1958
Episcopal consecration
- Principal consecrator: Pope Paul VI
- Co-consecrators: Sergio Pignedoli, Emmanuel Nsubuga
- Date: August 1, 1969
- Place: Kololo Terrace, Kampala, Uganda
Episcopal succession
Bishops consecrated by Emmanuel Milingo as principal consecrator
- Medardo Joseph Mazombwe: February 7, 1971
- George Augustus Stallings Jr.: September 24, 2006
- Peter Paul Brennan: September 24, 2006
- Patrick E. Trujillo: September 24, 2006
- Joseph J. Gouthro: September 24, 2006

Emmanuel Milingo (born June 13, 1930) is an excommunicated former Roman Catholic bishop from Zambia. He was ordained in 1958; in 1969, aged 39, Milingo was consecrated by Pope Paul VI as the bishop of the Archdiocese of Lusaka. In 1983, he stepped down from his position as Archbishop of Lusaka after criticism for exorcism and faith healing practices that were not approved by church authorities. In 2001, when Milingo was 71, he received a marriage blessing from Sun Myung Moon, the leader of the Unification Church, despite the prohibition on marriage for ordained priests. In July 2006, he established Married Priests Now!, an advocacy organization to promote the acceptance of married priests in the Roman Catholic Church.

On September 24, 2006, Milingo consecrated four men as bishops (including American George Augustus Stallings Jr., who had established an independent denomination) without a papal mandate. Through that act alone, Milingo had incurred a latae sententiae excommunication, which was stated by the Holy See Press Office two days later. On December 17, 2009, the Holy See Press Office announced that Milingo had been returned to the lay state, making him no longer a member of the Catholic clergy whilst continuing to maintain the powers received via sacramental character. Milingo retired from ministry in his movement for married priests in March 2013, appointing Peter Paul Brennan to take his place.

== Early life and career ==
=== Education and ordination ===
Born in 1930 in Mnukwa, Northern Rhodesia (now Zambia) to Yakobe Milingo and Tomaida Lumbiwe, he was educated at St Mary's Minor Seminary in Chipata. He attended the Kasina Seminary and Kachebere Seminary. He was ordained a priest in 1958. He served as the parish priest in Chipata from 1963 to 1966, and founded the Zambia Helpers' Society during this time. He was the secretary of Mass Media at the Zambia Episcopal Conference from 1966 to 1969 and founded the Daughters of the Redeemer.

Pope Paul VI consecrated him as bishop of the Archdiocese of Lusaka, the capital of Zambia. He served there from 1969 to 1983. In the 1970s, Milingo conducted public religious services of healing and exorcism, which attracted huge crowds. In 1999 and 2000, Milingo participated in mass-marriage ceremonies conducted by Sun Myung Moon's Unification Church in Japan and Korea, for which he received a severe written reprimand from Cardinal Angelo Sodano, Vatican Secretary of State.

In 1983, Pope John Paul II transferred Milingo to Rome because of his inappropriate use of his office of exorcism and his role in causing divisions in the Lusaka archdiocese. He was barred from practicing as a priest and bishop in Zambia, but the Pope appointed Milingo a "special delegate" of the Pontifical Council for Migrants and Travelers.

In 1992, Milingo endorsed the book On the Eucharist, a Divine Appeal, a collection of messages reputed to have been given by Jesus Christ in an apparition and written from September 8, 1987, to 1991 by Sr. Anna Ali, DOJS. These messages were a traditional call to conversion and eucharistic devotion, as well as expressing sadness over the current state of the Catholic priesthood. Although Milingo did not hold office as a diocesan bishop at the time, his name appears on the book's purported imprimatur, with the date March 17, 1992.

In the late 1990s, Milingo became well known in traditionalist and sedevacantist circles for a speech he gave at the Our Lady of Fatima 2000 International Conference on World Peace, organized by Canadian priest Nicholas Gruner and held November 18–23, 1996. He said that high-ranking members of the church hierarchy were "followers of Satan" or otherwise enabled evil:

The devil in the Catholic Church is so protected now that he is like an animal protected by the government; put on a game preserve that outlaws anyone, especially hunters, from trying to capture or kill it. The devil within the Church today is actually protected by certain Church authorities from the official devil-hunter in the Church—the exorcist. To the question, "Are there men of the [Roman] Curia who are followers of Satan?" Milingo responded, 'Certainly there are priests and bishops. I stop at this level of ecclesiastical hierarchy because I am an archbishop, higher than this I cannot go.

=== Marriage ===
In May 2001, Milingo said that the Roman Catholic Church should provide priests dispensation from the obligation of celibacy and should readmit married priests to the priestly ministry. To "set an example", at the age of 71, he and Maria Sung, a 43-year-old South Korean acupuncturist and Unificationist, married in a blessing ceremony in New York City, presided over by Sun Myung Moon and Hak Ja Han Moon. In July 2001, Cardinal Joseph Ratzinger (later Pope Benedict XVI), then prefect of the Congregation for the Doctrine of the Faith, issued a Public Canonical Admonition officially warning Milingo to separate from Moon and from contacts with the Unification Church. Milingo protested the order, saying, "How can I now leave my wife? For 43 years as a celibate priest I only knew God as a male. Now, through my union with Maria, I have come to see the other side of God's heart, which is female."

In a press conference organized by the Unification Church affiliate American Church Leadership Conference, Milingo said, "Celibacy has become a façade, secret affairs and marriages, raping of nuns, illegitimate children, rampant homosexuality, pedophilia and illicit sex have riddled the priesthood. Christ is mocked, the devil laughs."

In August 2001, Milingo met with Pope John Paul II, who appealed to him: "In the name of Jesus Christ, return to the Catholic Church." Milingo agreed to separate from Sung and went into seclusion. Sung went on a hunger strike and appeared outside of St. Peter's Basilica to protest their separation. In an interview on Italian television in 2002, Milingo said that he had spent a year in prayer and meditation in Argentina, at a Capuchin monastery. In November 2003, he made a trip to Africa over the objections of the Catholic bishops there. In 2004 and 2005, he kept a low profile and media accounts suggested that he was living in a monastery near Rome.

=== Organization for married priests ===
In late June or early July 2006, Milingo quietly left Italy and, on July 12, announced at a press conference at the National Press Club in Washington, D.C., his plans to "embark on an independent charismatic ministry to reconcile married priests with the Catholic Faith" as an advocate of the removal of the rule of celibacy for Latin Rite priests in the Catholic Church; the group is called Married Priests Now!. The sponsor of the press conference was MJT Television. Archbishop George Augustus Stallings Jr., also an excommunicated priest, who had founded his own Imani Temple African-American Catholic Congregation and married in 2001 at the same mass event as Milingo, spoke as well.

Stallings said that Milingo "is not seeking to defy or divide the (Roman Catholic) Church, but is acting out of deep love for the Church and concern for its future." In August 2006 Milingo rejoined his wife. In January 2010 the Catholic News Agency reported that 20 priests in Uganda had formed a breakaway Catholic sect that accepts married priests. This was said to have been inspired by Milingo; the group claims to have around 12,000 members.

=== Excommunication ===
On September 24, 2006, Milingo consecrated four married men as bishops, each of whom were already ordained in the Old Catholic apostolic succession and serving as a bishop in their respective Independent Catholic churches. One of the four was Stallings. The other three were Archbishop Peter Paul Brennan of the Order of Corporate Reunion and African Orthodox Church; Archbishop Patrick E. Trujillo of the Old Catholic Church in America; and Archbishop Joseph J. Gouthro of Las Vegas, presiding bishop of the Catholic Apostolic Church International.

Two days after the consecration of the four Americans as bishops—on September 26, 2006—the Holy See's press office announced the excommunication of all five men in a statement that Milingo and the four men involved in the episcopal consecration had automatically incurred excommunication (see Latæ sententiæ) in accordance with canon 1382 of the 1983 Code of Canon Law. According to the dogma of sacramental character, while the four men were consecrated against Catholic canons, they were validly but illicitly consecrated—which Roman Catholic canon law acknowledged; however, they would not be recognized as Roman Catholic bishops. In October 2007, Milingo's Vatican passport was revoked. This ended his status as a person with diplomatic protection by the Vatican City State.

== Reduction to the lay state ==
In December 2007, in Brazil, Milingo conferred episcopal ordination on Harold J. Norwood. On July 15, 2009, in Massa, Italy, he consecrated Vitaliy Kuzhelnyi as a bishop, a former priest of the Russian Orthodox Church and, later, of the Ukrainian Greek Catholic Church.

On December 17, 2009, the Holy See Press Office in a statement announced that Milingo had been dismissed from the clerical state. The statement explained the effect of the action as "loss of the rights and duties attached to the clerical state, except for the obligation of celibacy; prohibition of the exercise of any ministry, except as provided for by Canon 976 of the Code of Canon Law in those cases involving danger of death; loss of all offices and functions and of all delegated power, as well as prohibition of the use of clerical attire. Consequently, the participation of the faithful in any future celebrations organized by Archbishop Emmanuel Milingo is to be considered unlawful." Though laicized, he would still maintain sacramental power.

On June 11, 2011, the Pontifical Council for Legislative Texts issued a statement about illicitly consecrated bishops, pointing out the canons which provide for an automatic latae sententiae excommunication for both the consecrating bishop and those consecrated. Bishop Juan Ignacio Arrieta, Secretary of the Council, explained that the statement applied to the bishops consecrated by Milingo as well as to more recent cases.

=== Ecumenical Catholic Apostolic Church of Peace ===
In August 2010, Milingo was named Patriarch for Southern Africa of the new "Ecumenical Catholic Apostolic Church of Peace". He called for married former Catholic clergy to join the movement. In April 2011, he consecrated the Rev. Peter Njogu as a bishop in Nyeri, Kenya. In 2012, Milingo praised Sun Myung Moon for his work to promote religious unity. Milingo retired from ministry in 2013, appointing Archbishop Peter Paul Brennan as his successor. Later that year, he stated that he still considered himself a Roman Catholic.

== Published works ==
Music albums:

- Gubudu Gubudu (1995)
- Milingo Experience (2007)

Animated cartoon:

- Milingo the Spirit of Africa (1998), co-produced with the Italian cartoonist Mario Verger; music by Lucio Dalla, arrangements by the singer Ron and Aldo Azzaro.

Books: Milingo has written numerous books about healing and exorcism. They contain details about "the world in between" human beings and the divine, a world of evil and of good spiritual beings.

- The Flower Garden of Jesus the Redeemer
- Demarcations
- Precautions in the Ministry of Deliverance
- Make Joni (1972), illustrated by Arnold Chimfwembe (Lusaka: Neczam)
- The World in Between: Christian Healing and the Struggle for Spiritual Survival (1984, London: Orbis Books),
- Le mie preghiere non sono ascoltate ("My prayers are not heard") (1987),
- Guaritore d'anime: la mia storia, la mia fede (with Renzo Allegri; Milan: Mondadori, 1997).
- Confessioni di uno scomunicato ("Confessions of an Excommunicated Catholic") (2008), an autobiography

=== Literature ===
- Gerrie ter Haar: Black Minds Matter. Archbishop Milingo and the Vatican. Leiden, 2021. ISBN 978-90-5548-190-4 Online edition
- Gerrie ter Haar (International Institute of Social Studies): Spirit of Africa: The Healing Ministry of Archbishop Milingo of Zambia, London: Hurst, 1992; based on her 1991 Ph.D. thesis from Utrecht University.
