= Evans Chinyama Chinyemba =

Zambian Roman Catholic prelate

The Most Reverend Evans Chinyama Chinyemba
- Bishop of Mongu, Zambia
- Church: Catholic Church
- Archdiocese: Roman Catholic Archdiocese of Lusaka
- See: Roman Catholic Diocese of Mongu
- Appointed: 15 February 2011
- Predecessor: Paul Francis Duffy
- Successor: Incumbent

Orders
- Ordination: 19 August 2000
- Consecration: 28 May 2011 by Telesphore George Mpundu
- Rank: Bishop

Personal details
- Born: Evans Chinyama Chinyemba; August 9, 1967 (age 58); Lukulu, Diocese of Livingstone, Zambia

Styles of Evans Chinyama Chinyemba
- Reference style: His Grace; The Most Reverend
- Spoken style: Your Grace
- Religious style: Bishop

Evans Chinyama Chinyemba (born 9 August 1967) is a Zambian Catholic prelate who is the Bishop of the Diocese of Mongu. He was appointed Bishop of Mongu on 15 February 2011 by Pope Benedict XVI.

== Background and education ==
He was born on 9 August 1967, in the town of Lukulu, Lukulu District, in the Diocese of Livingstone, Zambia. Lukulu became part of the Diocese of Mongu, since 14 June 1997.

He attended primary school and secondary school in his home area. In 1991 he began the pre-novitiate education with the Oblates of Mary Immaculate. After completing the Novitiate in South Africa, he travelled to Rome, where he received his Bachelor's degree in philosophy and theology at the Pontifical Gregorian University.

== Priesthood ==
On 5 February 1994 he professed to be a Member of Oblates of Mary Immaculate. He took his perpetual vows of the Society on 6 January 1999. He was ordained a deacon on 17 April 1999 in Rome. He was ordained priest on 19 August 2000 at Lukulu. He served as a priest in various roles inside and outside of the Diocese of Mongu, until 15 February 2011.

While he was priest he held the following offices:

- Director of the Pre-novitiate of the Oblates of Mary Immaculate of Lusaka, from 2000 until 2009
- Vicar Superior of the OMI Delegation in Zambia from 2005 until 2009
- Pastor of St Leopoldo in Shang'ombo in the Diocese of Mongu from August 2009 until December 2009
- Superior of the OMI delegation in Zambia, since 2009.

== As bishop ==
On 15 February 2011, Pope Benedict XVI accepted the resignation of Bishop Paul Francis Duffy OMI, of the Diocese of Mongu, Zambia. The Holy Father nominated Father Evans Chinyama Chinyemba, OMI, as Bishop of Mongu, Zambia.

Father Evans Chinyama Chinyemba received episcopal consecration on 28 May 2011 at the hands of Cardinal Medardo Joseph Mazombwe, Archbishop Emeritus of Lusaka, assisted by Telesphore George Mpundu, Archbishop of Lusaka and Bishop Raymond Mpezele, Bishop of Livingstone.

== See also ==
- Edwin Mwansa Mulandu
- Catholicism in Zambia

== Succession table ==
Catholic Church titles
Preceded by Paul Francis Duffy (1997 - 2011)	Bishop of Diocese of Mongu; Since 28 May 2011	Succeeded by Incumbent
