= Cathedral of the Holy Child =

Cathedral of the Holy Child may refer to:

- Cathedral of the Holy Child, Manila, the Iglesia Filipina Independiente National Cathedral, Philippines
- Cathedral of the Holy Child, Calapan, seat of the Roman Catholic Apostolic Vicariate of Calapan, Philippines
- Child Jesus Cathedral, Lusaka, Zambia
- Infant Jesus Cathedral, Kollam, India

== See also ==
- Christ Child
