= Servants of the Holy Family =

All-male traditional Catholic religious community located in Colorado Springs

Servants of the Holy Family (Servi Sanctae Familiae)
- Abbreviation: S.S.F. (Latin); SHF (English)
- Formation: Feast of the Holy Family (January 9, 1977)
- Type: Private religious community for men
- Purpose: Sanctification through the traditional Latin Mass
- Location: 8528 Kenosha Drive, Colorado Springs, Colorado 80908, US
- Website: www.servi.org

Servants of the Holy Family (S.S.F. from Latin: Servi Sanctae Familiae) is a semi-contemplative, traditional Catholic religious community of men located in Colorado Springs, Colorado, United States. Membership includes priests, seminarians and brothers. SHF's website states that it is faithful to the traditional Latin Mass and Catholic doctrine and morals and claims to be endorsed by Catholic bishops worldwide who support the traditional Latin Mass. However, their founder was excommunicated for being illicitly consecrated as a bishop in 2024. The Diocese of Colorado Springs has stated they are not in communion with the Catholic Church.

== History ==
SHF was founded in 1977 on the feast of the Holy Family and was placed under the patronage of Jesus, Mary, and Joseph. The community has been located in Colorado since February 1977. The motherhouse with its chapel is situated on ten acres of land south of the Black Forest near the city of Colorado Springs, Colorado.

Their stated purpose is "to aspire after and achieve by the grace of God the sanctification of its members and the salvation of souls through their prayers, sacrifices and apostolate". It intends to accomplish this chiefly by attachment to the Holy Sacrifice of the traditional Latin Mass and to the Roman Breviary. They allow the public to attend many of their liturgical ceremonies.

In 1983, SHF was contacted by Archbishop Marcel Lefebvre, superior of the Society of Saint Pius X (SSPX), and Father Clarence Kelly, who had recently been separated from the SSPX with eight other priests. Lefebvre was seeking help because of this division and other internal problems in the SSPX. Kelly was looking for mediation between his group and the SSPX. SHF assisted both during these negotiations.

SHF met in 1989 at the Vatican with Augustin Cardinal Mayer, first president of the Pontifical Commission Ecclesia Dei. Subsequently, Cardinal Mayer appointed then-Archbishop (later Cardinal) J. Francis Stafford of Denver as his representative to visit SHF, have meetings with them and report back to the Commission. In 2008, Cardinal Darío Castrillón Hoyos, then president of the Pontifical Commission Ecclesia Dei, appointed Bishop James D. Conley as the Commission's Special Delegate to SHF from the Vatican.

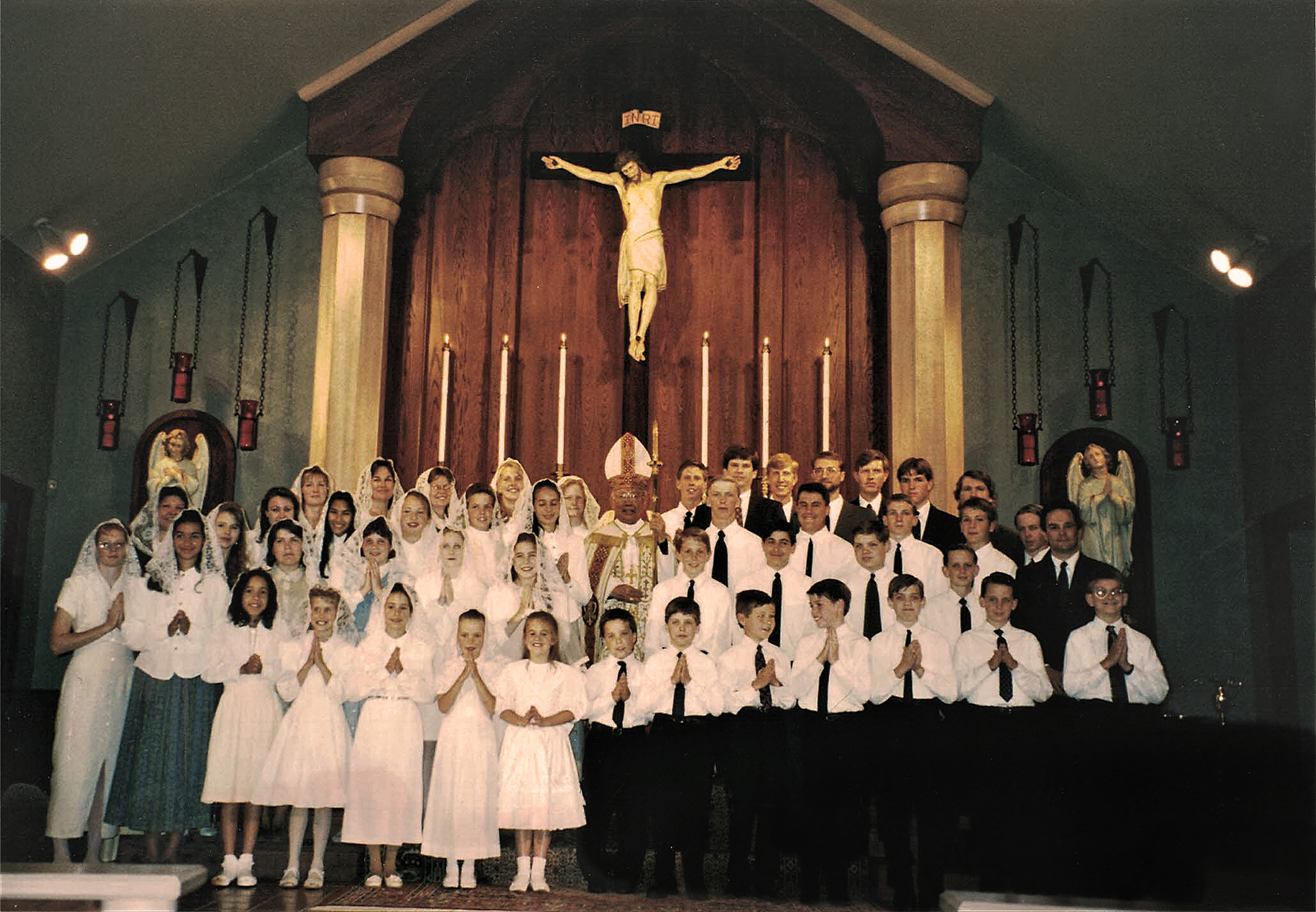
Bishop and the confirmed after Confirmation ceremony

SHF received new priest members when its seminarians were ordained by a visiting Catholic bishop in 1995. In 2013, Bishop Michael John Sheridan, the Bishop of Colorado Springs where the community is based, issued a document declaring that the SHF community was, "...not in good standing with the diocesan or universal Catholic Church". In this declaration, Sheridan cited canon law to illustrate that the community could not validly or licitly celebrate certain sacraments. In the following years, anonymous Catholic bishops who visited the community confirmed people who attended Mass at the SHF chapel. In 2018, another unnamed bishop gave tonsure and full minor orders, and in 2020, another unnamed bishop performed confirmations and ordination to the Holy Priesthood. In 2024, the founding Father, Anthony Ward was consecrated as a bishop by Telesphore George Mpundu, the retired archbishop of Lusaka, Zambia. A formal decree of excommunication was delivered by Víctor Manuel Fernández, Prefect of the Dicastery for the Doctrine of the Faith in 2025.
