= Roman Catholic Diocese of Abercorn =

(Roman Catholic) Diocese of Abercorn may refer to:

- the former Roman Catholic Diocese of Abercorn (Scotland) (UK), now a titular bishopric
- the colonial-age Roman Catholic Diocese of Abercorn (Northern Rhodesia), now the diocese of Mpika in Zambia
