= George Cosmas Zumaire Lungu =

Zambian Roman Catholic prelate

The Most Reverend George Cosmas Zumaire Lungu
- Bishop of Chipata
- Church: Roman Catholic Church
- Archdiocese: Lusaka
- See: Lusaka
- Appointed: 23 December 2002
- Installed: 23 February 2003
- Predecessor: Medardo Joseph Mazombwe (1970 - 1996): Appointed, Archbishop of Lusaka

Orders
- Ordination: 29 August 1985
- Consecration: 23 February 2003 by Archbishop Orlando Antonini
- Rank: Bishop

Personal details
- Born: George Cosmas Zumaire Lungu; 4 February 1960 (age 65); Zumaire, Diocese of Chipata, Zambia

Styles of George Cosmas Zumaire Lungu
- Reference style: [[ ]]
- Religious style: Bishop

George Cosmas Zumaire Lungu (born 4 February 1960) is a Zambian Catholic prelate who serves as Bishop of Chipata. He was appointed by John Paul II on 23 December 2002.

== Early life and education ==
Lungu was born on 4 February 1960 at Zumaire, in the Diocese of Chipata in the Eastern Province of Zambia.

== Priesthood ==
He was ordained a priest on 29 August 1985 at Chipata. He served as a priest in the Diocese of Chipata, until 23 December 2002.

== Episcopal career ==
He was appointed as the Bishop of Chipata by Pope John Paul II, on 23 December 2002 and was installed there on 23 February 2003. He was consecrated as bishop by Archbishop Orlando Antonini, Titular Archbishop of Formiae and Papal Nuncio to Zambia, assisted by Medardo Joseph Mazombwe, Archbishop of Lusaka, and Bishop Telesphore George Mpundu, Bishop of Mpika.

On 12 April 2018, the Zambia Conference of Catholic Bishops (ZCCB), elected him as president of their conference. He succeeded Telesphore Mpundu, the Archbishop Emeritus of Lusaka Archdiocese.

As president of the ZCCB, he was part of the organizers of a Peacebuilding Workshop in the capital city of Lusaka, to discuss and propose solutions to the then deteriorating national economic, social and security environment in the country in November 2020.

== See also ==
- Roman Catholicism in Zambia

== Succession table ==
Catholic Church titles
| Preceded by Medardo Joseph Mazombwe (1970-1996) | Bishop of Diocese of Chipata; Since 23 December 2002 | Succeeded by Incumbent |
