= Diocese of Mongu =

Roman Catholic diocese in Zambia

Coordinates: 15.2706°S 23.1356°E

Diocese of Mongu Dioecesis Monguensis

Location
- Country: Zambia
- Metropolitan: Lusaka

Statistics
- Area: 87,293 km^{2} (33,704 sq mi)
- Population: Total; Catholics: (as of 2004); 621,492; 56,386 (9.1%)

Information
- Rite: Latin Rite
- Cathedral: Cathedral of Our Lady of Lourdes

Current leadership
- Pope: Leo XIV
- Bishop: Evans Chinyama Chinyemba, O.M.I.

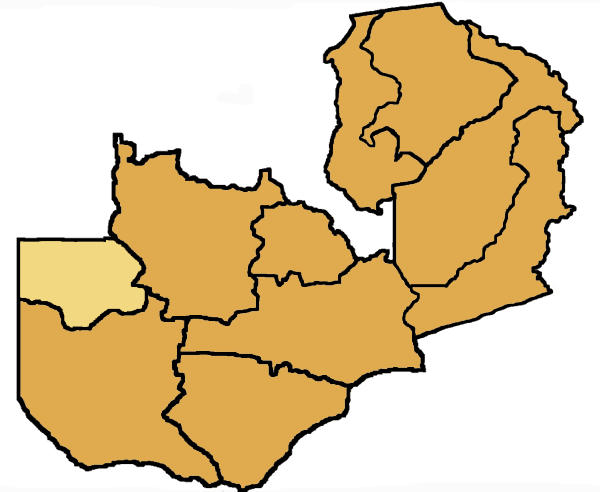
Map of the Diocese of Mongu, Zambia

The Roman Catholic Diocese of Mongu (Latin: Monguen(sis)) is a diocese located in Mongu in Zambia.

== History ==
- June 14, 1997: Established as Diocese of Mongu from the Diocese of Livingstone

== Leadership ==
- Bishops of Mongu (Roman rite)
  - Bishop Paul Francis Duffy, O.M.I. (June 14, 1997 - February 15, 2011)
  - Bishop Evans Chinyama Chinyemba, O.M.I. (since February 15, 2011)

== See also ==
- Roman Catholicism in Zambia

== Sources ==
- GCatholic.org
- Catholic Hierarchy
