= Alick Banda =

Zambian Roman Catholic prelate

- Archbishop
- Church: Catholic Church
- Archdiocese: Lusaka
- Appointed: 30 January 2018
- Predecessor: Telesphore George Mpundu
- Successor: Incumbent

Orders
- Ordination: 7 August 1994
- Consecration: 29 July 2007 by Nicola Girasoli
- Rank: Archbishop

Personal details
- Born: Alick Banda; November 15, 1963 (age 62) Mufulira, Mufulira District, Archdiocese of Ndola, Zambia
- Motto: "Instaurare Omnia in Christo" (To restore all things in Christ)

Styles of Alick Banda
- Reference style: His Excellency; The Most Reverend
- Spoken style: Your Excellency
- Religious style: Archbishop

Alick Banda (born 15 November 1963) is a Zambian Catholic bishop who serves as Archbishop of the Archdiocese of Lusaka. He was appointed Archbishop of Lusaka on 30 January 2018 by Pope Francis.

== Background and education ==
Alick Banda was born on 15 November 1963, in the town of Mufulira, Mufulira District, in the Archdiocese of Ndola. He attended primary school and middle school in his home area. He completed high school at a Junior Seminary in Ndola.

He pursued his priestly studies at Mpima Major Seminary in Kabwe, Zambia. Later he continued his education at St. Dominic's Major Seminary in Lusaka, where he graduated with the Diploma in philosophy, followed by a Bachelor's degree in Theology. He holds a Doctor of Philosophy in Canon Law from the Hochschule of St. Georges, Frankfurt, Germany.

== Priesthood ==
He was ordained a priest on 7 August 1994. He served as a priest of the Diocese of Ndola until 30 May 2007.

== As bishop ==
Father Banda was appointed Bishop of Solwezi on 30 May 2007 and received episcopal consecration at Solwezi on 29 July 2007 at the hands of Archbishop Nicola Girasoli, Titular Archbishop of Egnazia Appula and Papal Nucio, assisted by Archbishop Telesphore George Mpundu, Archbishop of Lusaka and Bishop Noel Charles O'Regan, Bishop of Ndola.

Bishop Banda was appointed Bishop of Ndola on 13 November 2009, and was installed on 16 January 2010, succeeding Bishop Noel Charles O'Regan, who resigned. In 2014 the Council of the Catholic University of Eastern Africa (CUEA) elected him vice-chairman of the council, at their meeting at the CUEA campus at Lang'ata, Kenya.

On 30 January 2018, he was appointed Archbishop of the Archdiocese of Lusaka and Apostolic Administrator of Ndola. That apostolic administration ceased on 15 August 2020. He was installed as Archbishop of Lusaka on 14 April 2018.

== See also ==
- Benjamin S. Phiri
- Catholicism in Zambia

Catholic Church titles
Preceded by Telesphore George Mpundu (28 October 2006 - 30 January 2018)	Archbishop of Lusaka; 2018 – present	Succeeded by Incumbent
