= Roman Catholic Diocese of Kabwe =

Roman Catholic diocese in Zambia

Coordinates: 14.4431°S 28.4397°E

Diocese of Kabwe Dioecesis Kabvensis

Location
- Country: Zambia
- Metropolitan: Lusaka

Statistics
- Area: 63,574 km^{2} (24,546 sq mi)
- Population: Total; Catholics: (as of 2011); 1,078,334; 138,810 (12.9%)

Information
- Rite: Latin Rite
- Cathedral: Cathedral of the Sacred Heart of Jesus

Current leadership
- Pope: Leo XIV
- Bishop: Clement Mulenga, S.D.B.

The diocese of Kabwe (in Latin: Dioecesis Kabvensis) is a diocese of the Roman Catholic Church located in Kabwe, Zambia.

== Territory ==
The diocese is composed of the following districts of the Central Province of Zambia: Chisamba, Kabwe, Kapiri Mposhi, Mkushi, Chibombo and Serenje.

The see is located in the city of Kabwe, where is located the cathedral of the Sacred Heart of Jesus.

The territory is divided into 31 parishes.

== History ==
The diocese was created on October 29, 2011, by the Papal bull Cum nuper of Pope Benedict XVI, taking territories of the dioceses of Mpika and Lusaka.

== Bishops ==
- Clement Mulenga, S.D.B., since October 29, 2011

== Statistics ==
At the date of creation, the diocese counted 138,810 baptized among a population of 1,078,334 people, which is 12.9%.

Year	Population			Priests				Deacons	Religious		Parishes
	baptised	total	%	number	secular	regular	baptised per priest		men	women
2011	138,810	1,078,334	12.9	37	12	25	3,752		25	70	17

== See also ==
- Catholic Church in Zambia
