= Christianity in Zambia =

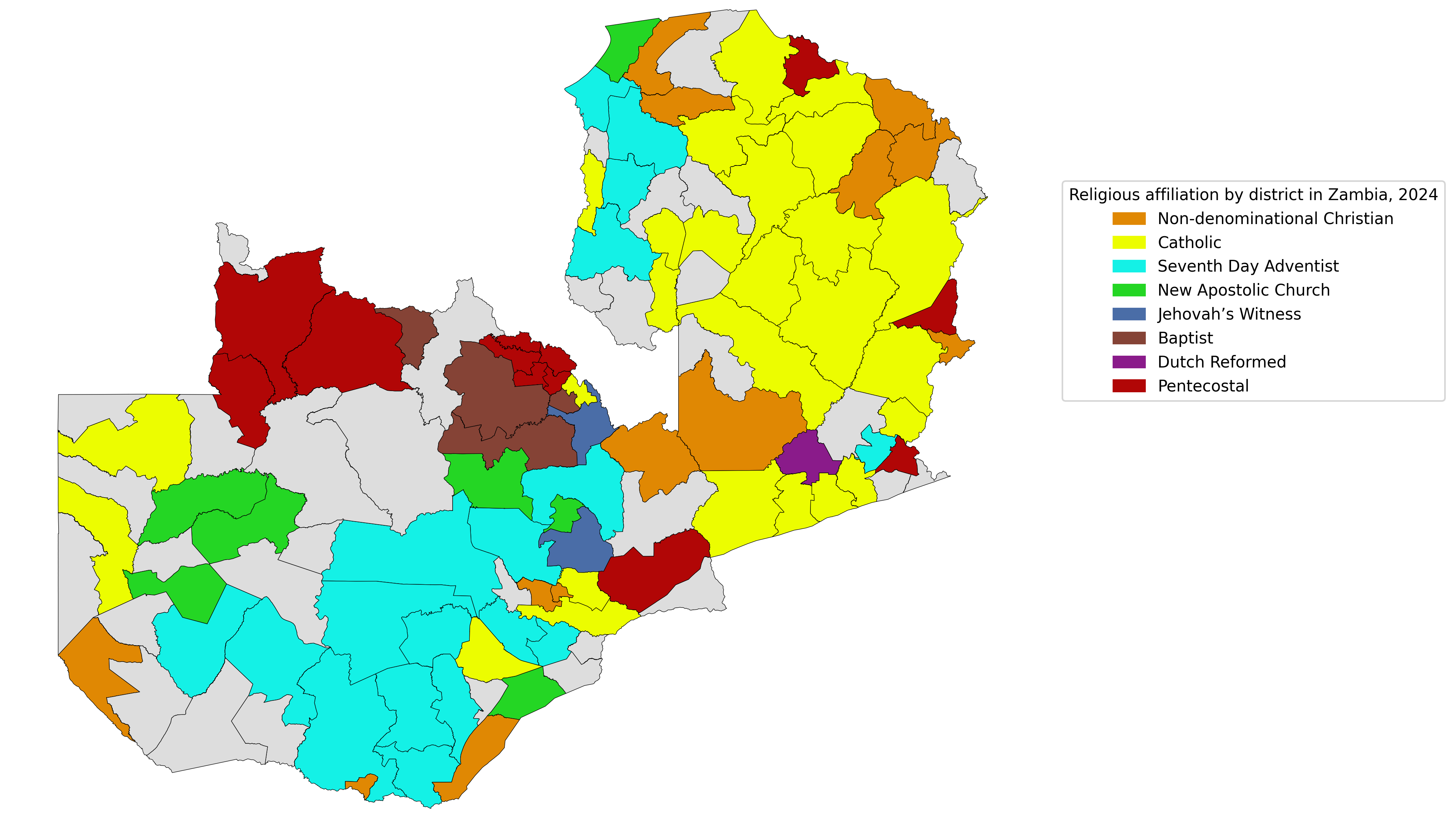
Largest Christian denomination by district in Zambia according to 2024 survey

Christianity has been very much at the heart of religion in Zambia since the European colonial explorations into the interior of Africa in the mid 19th century. The area features heavily in the accounts of David Livingstone's journeys in Central Africa.

The 2022 census found that 98.0% of Zambians are Christian, while 74.5% of Zambians were Protestant (mainly Pentecostal and Seventh-day Adventist), 17.9% were Catholic and 5.6% were Jehovah's Witnesses.

Figures in 2020 suggested that 85% of the country had a Christian background, with 34% following Protestantism and 32% following Catholicism.

== Establishing Zambia ==
Christian denomination in Zambia (2022 census)
Denominations	Population	%
Roman Catholic	3.220.214	17.9
Seventh day-Adventist	3.183.685	17.7
Pentecostal	3.142.575	17.5
United Church in Zambia	1.727.783	9.6
New Apostolic Church	1.513.225	8.4
Jehovah's Witnesses	1.009.578	5.6
Baptist	651.111	3.6
Reformed Church in Zambia	464.053	2.6
Church of Christ	296.697	1.7
Anglican	237.597	1.3
Methodist	134.382	0.7
Brethren in Christ	113.070	0.6
Salvation Army	100.479	0.6
Presbyterian	72.056	0.4
Wesleyan	54.230	0.3
Lutheran	23.864	0.1
Episcopal	12.787	0.1
Restorationism	9.142	0.1
Other Christian	1.999.849	9.2
Total Christians	17.966.377	98.0

Livingstone's exploration of the region coincided with an increased interest in missions in the Evangelical churches in Britain, and, despite his complicated motives, Livingstone became the darling of Evangelical expansion. This interest was largely influenced by,

"the result of revivalism among Pietists and Methodists and among the Evangelicals of the Anglican church. People wanted to convert others to the same joyous religious experience they had had".

The rise in missionary zeal was heightened with the expansion of European empires, opening up unknown territories and bringing other cultures to the attention of the newly formed mission societies. Yet another element of this increased mission activity was the desire not to see a repeat of the recent Indian Mutiny, that the Evangelicals, like Livingstone, felt was, "as a result of too little mission activity". It is possible the cause of the mutiny was actually of a religious origin with many of the Indians serving in the British Indian Army convinced, "that the British did indeed have plans to Christianize India", and thereby threatening their faith that was in their view indivisible from their vocation as a soldier, whether as a Hindu, Muslim or Sikh.

Livingstone inspired many Evangelicals in his speech at the Senate House in Cambridge University in 1857 in which he stated,

"I consider we made a great mistake when we carried commerce into India, in being ashamed of our Christianity… those two pioneers of civilisation – Christianity and commerce – should ever be inseparable".

He concluded the speech with the call,

"I go back to Africa to make an open path for Commerce and Christianity; do you carry out the work I have begun. I leave it with you".

Following Livingstone's death in 1873, at Ilala by the shores of Lake Bangweulu in North Eastern Zambia, and the subsequent development of preventatives and cures for malaria based on quinine, mission societies stepped in to take up where he had left off by establishing Christianity in Central Africa. In a report on the Church and development in Zambia the London Missionary Society (LMS) was the first organisation to establish a mission station based at Niamikolo close to Lake Tanganyika in 1885 followed by numerous other mission stations throughout the country. Part of the reason for the rapid spread of these stations was their acceptance among some of the smaller tribes of the northern region of Zambia. They perceived that the, "missionaries… would provide effective protection", from attackers, such as the more powerful Bemba tribe. Other mission stations followed the LMS example and established a presence in other regions. Examples include the Paris Evangelical Mission at Lealui 1892, The Primitive Methodists working among the Illa people in Western Zambia in 1892, the Presbyterians at Mwenzo in 1894. After independence in 1965 these four mission societies were to merge their works and become known as the United Church of Zambia (UCZ). Zambia's increased mission activity was not an isolated case though, globally the number of missionaries rose dramatically during this period. "By the end of the century there were as many as 12,000 British missionaries "in the field", representing no less than 360 different societies and other bodies".

In shaping Zambia's Christianity, it is important that the influence of the Roman Catholic Church is noted. The, "Catholic Church [is] by far the most influential denomination," in the nation. Catholic missionaries first established a mission in 1895 among the Bemba tribe. The Bemba tribe had traditionally been hostile to church activity, partly due to the resistance to settlement by Europeans, but also because their presence strengthened the resolve of rival ethnic groups to resist the Bemba. With the death of the Bemba king Chitimukulu Sampa Kapalakasha and his replacement by a less antagonistic king the way was open for the Catholic White Fathers to establish the mission in the area that was to become the Copperbelt Province of Northern Zambia. In Southern Zambia the Catholic mission activity was undertaken by Jesuit Fathers in the early years of the twentieth century along with the Franciscan friars. Zambia still retains the historical divisions of this early Catholic mission activity; the county is still divided into diocese administered by each of these groups.

The first Anglican mission station would not begin until 1911. This was established by Leonard Kamungu, a priest from Malawi, at Msoro. Kamungu perhaps reflects an aspect of Christianity that set it apart from many of the other structures of colonialism that severely limited if not actively restricted the ability of the local population to take a part in their development, becoming isolated and voiceless from the ruling European elite.

"Though white settlers ... were able to organize themselves in Formal groups… the colonial authorities provided little space for urban indigenous people to formally organize. Although there was some tolerance of group activity under the umbrella of the church.

Traditional Anglican involvement in Zambia was undertaken by the Universities' Mission to Central Africa (UMCA), which had been founded in Cambridge as a direct result of the fiftieth anniversary of Livingstone's call for African evangelism. Though unlike many of Livingstone's original audience the UMCA held to a less Evangelical and more Anglo-Catholic form of Christian theology. Consequently, although highly influential, despite its small numbers, modern-day Anglicanism in Zambia does not have the Evangelical fervour that is evident elsewhere in modern-day African nations that were formally British colonial possessions.

Livingstone, though certainly at the vanguard of the colonisers, and in that capacity he spelled the end to traditional Zambian society, he is still held in high regard by many contemporary Zambian's. This perhaps reflects an understanding of Livingstone as less of a coloniser and more as a bringer of the Christian faith that today over seventy five percent, more recent surveys put it as high as eighty-five percent, of the population embrace in one form or another. Christianity is still, "growing at a rate of nearly 4 percent per year", in a nation with an annual average population growth rate of 2.7 percent from 1990 to 1999. Possibly some of this affection is also because Livingstone is perceived as a defender of the traditional societies as he defied the slave traders who were already destroying communities; one of his multiple motives for being in the region was anti-slavery and towards the end of his life a primary drive in his work. Though, as with many interventions of this nature, the possible motives were not as philanthropic as they first appeared to those under threat. Livingstone saw the oppressed communities as a basis for his "potential village preaching centres", to spread the gospel and in so doing provide a stable base for European culture. Like much of what Livingstone undertook the reality is complex and in many of his wanderings he was actually forced to rely on the slave trade's logistical networks. Again Livingstone's legacy lives on in many development initiatives undertaken on the continent both in religious and secular capacities, a seemingly positive intervention, which carries wider motives and implications.

== Colonial era ==
During the period of colonial rule in Zambia, up until independence in 1964, the church attempted to straddle the gulf between ministering to the needs of the local population without antagonising the colonial administration and bringing the local population to a point of passive acceptance of colonial rule. The administration viewed church activity as a possibly practical tool of indoctrination, but at times a vehicle for dissent against colonial rule too.

The traditional view of the Church during this period was to provide social welfare. Churches became primarily involved in education and healthcare. Other initiatives such as orphanages, skills training and agricultural extension were also evident in the development of Zambia during this period. Though at times its role extended into advocacy and the formulation of law and the penal code.

In the matter of healthcare the churches saw the provision of affordable healthcare as vital to a population that could not afford private medical treatment. Even in current-day Zambia, the Catholic Church alone is running 15 hospitals, 28 health centres, 54 home based care institutions. The provision of healthcare had a twofold motivation. Firstly, there was the concern driven by Biblical principles of care for the incapacitated. Examples include the parable of the Good Samaritan Luke 10:25-37, then Jesus' encouragement in Matthew 25:36 "I was sick and you looked after me, " and the Old Testament reprimand to the leaders of Israel, "you have not strengthened the weak or healed the sick or bound up the injured," Ezk 34:4, Secondly, it was driven by a perception that the only alternative medical care available to the local population involved traditional healers and their use of, in colonial eyes, unscientific and crude methods as well as possible appeals to animistic or ancestral powers. These latter elements were of particular concern in ecclesiastical circles as, the Church has generally tried to change or discourage cultural practices that are contrary to Christian teaching. Christian missions were at the forefront of social change in Zambia. On the question of traditional penal codes, that were either considered too lenient or too harsh depending on the change the missions wished to see imposed, as opposed to a legal code more in line with that in Britain the Church was instrumental in pushing through reform. The involvement of missionaries was "more than providing correctives – spiritual or otherwise… their real ambition was power". Generally though healthcare had impact on indigenous society it was seen as a reasonably neutral activity by the colonial authorities.

Education on the other hand would prove to be a little more of a double edged sword for the colonial administration. Paradoxically, as the state sought to control education policy by taking out of the hands of the churches so the clamour for the demise of colonial rule, from a mission educated local population, rose. Schools were often found associated with the mission stations. The prime focus of education was on rural areas and the schools themselves retained the flavour of the particular denomination that had established them. Though the PAG report notes, "the exception was to be found on the Copperbelt where the formation of the United Missions in the Copperbelt in the 1930s ushered in inter-denominational schools." The schools usually offered a rudimentary education in basic reading, Bible study and practical subjects beyond this it was felt the local population would have little use for higher education as it could lead to isolation from their communities.

Once more the Bible provided a precedent for missionaries to involve themselves in education, "train a child in the way he should go, and when he is old he will not turn from it," Proverbs 22:6. For the missionaries the practical outworking of this exhortation in Zambia was threefold:

1. As a means to evangelism. The Evangelical churches in particular saw the personal study of the Bible as a vital part of the discipleship of converts to Christianity. Therefore, the ability to read was vital to this concept (It also meant that the Church was at the forefront of recording African aural languages so as to produce translated scriptures). All denominations though perceived that giving the children a Biblical education would draw them away from the traditional instruction in the village.
2. Education was also seen as a method by which European values and culture could be instilled into the population.
3. Formal education would also provide skilled workers for the mission station. Church workers, construction workers, teachers etc. Later they would also provide skilled labour for commerce, government and the mines.

The concept of providing only basic education, as was the case with many mission schools, was called into question following a revolt in Malawi in 1918 in which mission trained teachers and former students played a part. The colonial authorities felt that education needed a more formal basis, to be under closer scrutiny and to provide greater openings for the more apt pupils. "The government introduced a proclamation which demanded the registration of schools [and]… empowered magistrates and Native Commissioners to inspect schools." By 1922 the General Missionary Conference passed a resolution calling for the "establishment of one or more government colleges or institutions to provide instruction in agriculture, forestry, pedagogy and the duties of chiefs." Further to this the "institution [was] to be under the management of a joint council of the nominees or the Administration and representatives of the missions", setting the precedent for partnership between the state and church in education.

From the 1920s onwards there was to be a gradual erosion of the church's primacy in education in Zambia. Understanding the need for increased professionalism among its staff the Anglican Church "closed all its schools for 18 months between 1918 and 1920 and brought all their teachers to Msoro for retraining." The advisory board devised the Native School Code by 1927 establishing the state as the arbiter of educational standards in Zambia. The state now had the power to deregister schools that did not operate for the prescribed number of days in a year or did not cover adequately the curriculum developed by the Board. The number of registered mission schools declined significantly during this period. "Of the 547 schools run by the White Fathers only 17 qualified as schools under the new conditions." Part of the reason that the Copperbelt Schools were inter-denominational was the pressure from the Board not to allow contending schools to open up in the towns and repeat the rivalry that was prevalent elsewhere leading to small villages with two schools run by competing missions.

Following the Second World War the government opened its own schools in some provinces. This event was to draw the Christian denominations and indigenous authorities together in a consensus on education in an attempt to reinforce their positions. Some Churches saw the government policy as an attempt to secularise education and resisted the move openly. In 1951 Local Education Authorities (LEA) were established to take control of government schools and were also authorised to take control of any mission schools that the indigenous authorities, mission societies or any other voluntary organisation no longer wanted to administer. Many of the Protestant missions handed their schools over. "By 1963 – the dawn of Zambia's independence – 800 of the 2,100 schools were L.E.A while the rest were mainly agency schools 30 per cent of which were operated by the Catholics."

Despite their decline the mission schools had become the place where the aspiration for independence was established and nurtured, as well as promoting colonial structure they had also encouraged critical thinking enabling students to contest the status quo. "It was the mission centres that became the birthplace of post-war African nationalism." In the wider context the churches had also to become advocates for the people who congregated their buildings for worship and populated their parishes. Although an outside agency they were equipped and informed enough and had sufficient influence both in Zambia and back in Britain to intercede for those who had little voice in the colonial political system. It would not be until after independence that indigenous or even international NGOs would have a comparable voice. Phiri states, "since churches remain 'zones of freedom' and in some cases more or less a 'state within a state', they tend to take up the political functions of repressed organizations. This leads to confrontation with the state.

Weller & Linden cite a Catholic missionary who reported that a missionary from the Presbyterian mission was compelled to complain "to the Foreign Office in London about the behaviour of the company's officials in his area. Villages burnt, and chiefs and headmen put in chains, in order to intimidate them into sending their people to do carrier service." In fact one of the briefs of the General Missionary Council was "to watch over the interests of the Native races." Churches were to involve themselves in diverse campaigns such as poll tax reform, the effects on families due to labour migration and issues of racial inequality.

During this period there was a rise in African Indigenous Churches (AICs). These churches were founded and run by Zambian's who either defected from the mission churches dissatisfied with their European bias or their stayed theology or they were founded during the labour migrations of the 1920s into the Copperbelt. "Among the labourers were Africans who had been introduced to Christianity in their home regions and who, upon discovering no church whatsoever in the Copperbelt, decided to start a church themselves – one that was entirely directed and sustained by Africans." also. It was AICs that would be the initial breeding grounds for nationalist sentiments, and it was this fervour that crept over the denominational lines through informal contacts and into the more politically powerful mainline churches.

The imposition of the Federation of Rhodesia and Nyasaland in 1953 brought some of these issues to a head. In Zambia it was felt that the Federation exacerbate the issues of racial inequality and economically favoured Zimbabwe over Zambia and Malawi. The Christian Council of Northern Rhodesia, that had replaced the General Missionary Conference in 1944, stated its position clearly when it wrote:

"Under normal circumstances the Church is bound to support the State and the forces aimed as preserving law and order, but this obligation is qualified by the Church's higher loyalty to the law of God. Where the State is misusing its Stewardship of power; where it is not adequately fulfilling its function of protecting the God-given freedom of all its citizens; where it is favouring one section of the community to the detriment of the others, then a Christian is called to protest ad to take whatever action is compatible with the Christian Gospel."

The imposition of the Federation was a response by Britain to shore up an empire it could no longer maintain after the war. In its attempts to preserve its power the colonial government alienated the churches as some of the most powerful civil society groups in the nation, prompting open opposition to its policies. It would not be long before this rift allied with an educated Zambian elite would bring about calls for Zambian independence. It was a lesson that would not be lost on future governments.

== Independence ==
The drive for an independent Zambia found a secure home in the churches. "The Christian Church… formed a crucial part of the associational landscape in many Sub-Saharan countries, consisting not only of a forum for spiritual communication but also a sanctuary for secular resistance." Phiri noted that "the mission centres provided a place where the contradictions between Christianity and the politics of racism and colonialism could be discussed in relative freedom… The effect of this was that the anti-colonial struggle in Zambia was clearly driven by Christian beliefs and packaged in Christian social action."

The Lumpa Church was established in 1954 by Alice Lenshina, from a village near Lubwa Mission in Chinsali District of Northern Province of Zambia. It quickly spread to the whole of Northern Province, Eastern Province and the Copperbelt, was an AIC. It staid aloof of the nationalist struggle against the colonial rule. This led to the accusation that the Church was actually opposing the struggle as recently had been initiated by the ANC and later UNIP. The main aim of the Lumpa Church was to clean the country of witchcraft. This message was very popular. She helped also to reintegrate widows who could get important positions in her church, for example as prayer leaders or as church choir leaders. Lenshina's movement had specifically spiritual roots, she was "a peasant woman who claimed to have died and risen again." Encouraged by Fergus Macpherson, the Scottish missionary of Lubwa Mission to share her story she gathered a large following and formed an independent church.

The rapid rise of the Lumpa church and its reluctance to involve itself with anti-colonial struggle led to violent conflicts with the UNIP youth in Chinsali District and then later also with colonial authorities. In 1963 the new majority government with Kenneth Kaunda as prime minister send the army into the district to restore order and to capture Lenshina. Sporadic clashes became an open war, in which the official death toll was 1,111, although it was probably much larger Lenshina surrendered herself to the army and was sentenced to life imprisonment. The Lumpa Church was banned. Tens of thousands of her followers fled to the Congo. The Church only reappeared after the fall of Kaunda in 1988.

Much of the latter conflict with the Lumpa Church had been undertaken by the transitional government formed to take over from the colonial administration in 1964. This transitional government was led by Kenneth Kaunda. Kaunda was himself a product of the mission schools, as was his father, David, who was "a well-educated Malawian preacher and schoolteacher… who moved to Zambia as a missionary." Kaunda would emphasize his Christian roots, especially in the lead up to independence and in the early years of his presidency. "I was brought up in a Christian home and my Christian belief is part of me now. It is still my habit to turn to God in prayer asking for his guidance." His Christian beliefs ensured the colonial administration were favourably disposed towards Kaunda and the United National Independence Party (UNIP) that he led. His faith also bought him wide support in the churches both African and European led. However, Kaunda also emphasised that it was his understanding of the Bible's teachings that led him to conclude that colonialism "was immoral because it denied Africans their God-given dignity".

Though the church was the seedbed for much of the nationalism that brought about independence in Zambia, Phiri notes that the freedoms that nationalism wrought were to allow other secular civil society associations to ease the church aside as the main source of opposition to colonial rule. With Kaunda's declarations of faith and independence the church retracted from the political sphere, merely lending support to the government policies when necessary. Phiri maintains that this demonstrates the reverse of the phenomenon that Bayart observed in Cameroon in which "churches often replace the manifestly political institutions in certain of their functions. When civil society is repressed by a predatory state, a vacuum occurs in the political system." Phiri indicates that the relative freedoms of political association and the improved public spending initiatives of the early years of UNIP rule caused the Church to return to a more traditional pastoral role. Others, such as Gifford, suggest that Bayart's observations are too generalised and were specific in geographical and chronological reference only to Cameroon at the time Bayart made them. Therefore, it is difficult to translate these interpretations either to newly independent Zambia or even to the present day circumstances.

In 1972 the political freedoms declined markedly and this was rapidly followed by economic volatility as well. In response to, Simon Kapwepwe, the former Vice-president's attempt to form an alternative political party to UNIP Kaunda's government declared Zambia a one party state. The following year Zimbabwe closed its borders to "all Zambian exports, except copper, which adversely affected the economy". Exports were diverted through Tanzania and Angola, but in 1974 the outbreak of civil war in Angola was to have a further impact on the Zambian economy. At this time the price of copper, accounting for 95% of Zambia's export earnings, began to fall dramatically. By 1976 Kaunda was forced to declare a state of emergency and the dramatic dip in revenue caused the UNIP government to borrow heavily, significantly increasing Zambia's external debt. The worsening economic situation and increasing debt led the IMF to intervene in the 1980s to shore up the economy and impose Structural Adjustment Programmes (SAPs) on Zambia. Kaunda only survived politically with the return and reconciliation with Kapwepwe in 1978.

During this period there was also a shift in the power and politics in Zambian ecclesiastical life. The churches began to assemble around three representative bodies: The Episcopal Conference of Zambia (ECZ), the Christian Council of Zambia (CCZ) and the Evangelical Fellowship of Zambia (EFZ). The ECZ was a unified voice for the component elements of the Roman Catholic Church; the CCZ was largely the traditional Protestant mission churches, the UCZ, the Anglicans etc. and the EFZ was started by the Baptists as a more Evangelical body, but as the years have passed has become increasingly Pentecostal. Following independence the colonial mission churches came under pressure from two fronts. The first was a growth in AICs that "split off from mission churches, usually because of perceived racism, or… to incorporate local elements that the mission churches would not countenance." The second came from the influx of missionaries, especially from the United States, who were sent by Pentecostal and Charismatic churches. The emphasis on the miraculous and an acknowledgement of the impact of the spiritual realm on the physical world had a great impact in Africa, where "the traditional culture of African society… draws little distinction between the spiritual and the temporal." The growth in the AICs in particular and probably the memory of the Lumpa uprising caused Kaunda to impose "a ban on the registration of new churches", in 1988 to "stem what he considered to be an 'unprecedented establishment of breakaway churches'". This move though was indicative of a widening gap between the church and state in regards to the economic policies, political ideologies and personal life of Kaunda.

During the late 1960s the UNIP government embarked on a more radical socialist agenda which became known as Scientific Socialism. This move alarmed the wider Christian community of Zambia fearing that it could lead to Marxist Humanism in the nation. The ECZ, CCZ and EFZ took the unusual step of issuing "a joint statement entitled Marxism, Humanism and Christianity". The government fearing a backlash from the public toned down its policies. Phiri comments on this episode, "the churches discerned that the UNIP was adopting socialism not necessarily because of an ideological change of heart, but as another method of control." The success of the combined pressure prompted the three bodies to continue to work closely in terms of public policy, which Gifford goes on to note "makes Zambian Christianity… virtually unique on the continent" in that "the co-operation includes Pentecostals."

The ideological tensions rose again when Kaunda identified his personal political philosophy as "Zambian Humanism". To Kaunda it was the coming together of his Christian ethics and the values of traditional African society. However, Kaunda's newly expounded philosophical outlook ran headlong into the theological outlook of the churches of the EFZ that were being heavily influenced by the new missionary movement from the United States. Gifford notes that Kaunda's "idealistic and utopian combination" endured the anger of the EFZ influenced by "American Evangelism [for whom] the word humanism carried the worst of connotations", Colin Morris, an English Methodist missionary in Zambia who was a friend and strong supporter of Kaunda, described Kaunda's beliefs as syncretistic: "he can make himself a cathedral, mosque, temple or synagogue with an ease that makes nonsense of religious divisions." By now Kaunda had lost the trust of the churches who regarded him as a "renegade Christian presiding over a corrupt and oppressive government". The churches refused to co-operate with the 1976 education reforms believing that because of socialism, "government's educational ideology was atheistic".

The harshness of the SAPs was to cause serious food riots in Zambia during the last years of the UNIP government when subsidies on staples, such as maize meal, were removed. Kaunda was often forced to back-pedal and reinstate the subsidies. In doing so the UNIP government incurred the wrath of the IMF who blacklisted Zambia on the international financial markets, so furthering its poverty. With the halcyon days of post-independence free education and health now in the past the poor in particular needed to look elsewhere for help. Shao says, "when a government is unable to build a clinic in a village, the people's tendency is to look to the church for help." the same was true in Zambia at this period. With the waning of Kaunda's star the power of churches was in the ascendancy again and any serious challenger to Kenneth Kaunda would need to show indisputable Christian credentials.

== The church and the Christian nation ==
The political unrest in Zambia, including food riots in which 30 people died and an attempted coup, resulted in a call for multi-party democracy. "The demand for Democracy in many countries in Africa, including Zambia, was also an expression of opposition to the effects of structural adjustment." The beleaguered Kaunda capitulated and called a referendum. In mid 1990, "The Movement for Multiparty Democracy (MMD), an unofficial alliance of political opponents of the Government, was formed" under the leadership of the recently ousted Finance Minister Arthur Wina and the leader of the Zambian trade unions, Frederick Chiluba, to fight the democratic corner in the referendum. Kaunda then postponed the referendum by a year, but by then the momentum was too strong even in his own party. By the end of 1990 Kaunda announced that multi-party elections would be held in October 1991. The "MMD chose not to disband into many small parties that could easily be defeated by the UNIP. Instead the MMD registered as one party and elected the popular trade unionist Fredrick Chiluba as its presidential candidate."

Though the churches steered a careful course so as not to actively promote any party Phiri notes that "pro-democracy political sermons became frequent in many churches," but concludes, "despite their bias towards change, the Churches commendably maintained a non-partisan role, emerging as critical agents of reconciliation during critical times." Churches were to hold days of prayer for the election process, including election night itself, and, "in the few months before the elections, the churches made probably their greatest contribution to a peaceful transition. They joined to form the Christian Churches Monitoring Group, which then became the Zambia Elections Monitoring Coordinating Committee (ZEMEC), which set out to train a grassroots army to observe procedures at all polling stations on election day." Jimmy Carter who led the international team of observers notes that at a time of "political impasse", between Chiluba and Kaunda the Anglican Cathedral in Lusaka provided the "acceptable meeting place for both parties. Their meeting, which began with shared prayer, resulted eventually in a redrafting of the constitution that opened the way for the elections." Chiluba later credited Carter as being sent from God.

Christians wary of Kaunda's somewhat unorthodox theological positions in the past were further antagonised when the President began openly flirting with Eastern Religious beliefs. The growing perception in Zambia was "that Kaunda had not just forsaken true Christianity, but had fallen under the sway of Eastern gurus… in the 1980s he became linked with a Dr M. A. Ranganathan and established his David Universal Temple at State House." Phiri states that the association with "Eastern Religions… was not acceptable to Zambian Christians." The tensions caused by the perceived drift of Kaunda from Christian orthodoxy were exacerbated when Kaunda alleged "churches were preaching hatred" in response to negative articles about his regime in two Christian publications. Possibly in an attempt to antagonise the churches even more Kaunda joined with a television project with the Marharishi Mahesh Yogi launching a scheme to make Zambia "Heaven on Earth"" Kaunda was forced in a television interview to deny practising Transcendental Meditation. This was televised on the state-run channel days before polling. Gifford notes that the response by senior pastors from Ndola, the principal town of the Copperbelt, was to call the project "demonic" and they "deplored the fact that the government 'had banned the registration of more churches but permitted occult systems to enter Zambia'".

Smith observes that Fredrick Chiluba "was situated quite differently than Kaunda – politically and religiously speaking. Politically speaking he symbolised a new generation." not caught up in the dogma of the colonialism verses nationalism debate of Kaunda, but representing the developmental needs of Zambia. In the run up to the elections Chiluba was to use the rift between Kaunda and Christians to his advantage by emphasising his Christianity. He "stressed (and his supporters stressed even more) his impeccable credentials as a true spirit-filled believer. Christian motifs were introduced into the political struggle – the diminutive Chiluba being frequently referred to as David challenging Goliath, and even more frequently as Moses, about to bring his people to freedom after almost forty years of fruitless wanderings in the wilderness." Phiri states that "Chiluba gained the support of the churches [while] Kaunda simultaneously lost his."

At the election on 31 October 1991, Fredrick Chiluba "received 75.79% of the votes cast" and the MMD won 125 of the 150 seats in the national assembly in elections that, "international observers reported… had been conducted fairly". Haynes states that this was "brought about in part due to the perception that the previous government under K. Kaunda threatened the Church". Though opposition to SAPs had led to the elections the candidate's personalities their religious beliefs might have masked the economic concerns. Simutanyi notes that "during the election campaign the question of the economy was not given serious attention." The excitement elicited among ordinary Zambians at the opportunity to elect a party of their choice enabled the "erstwhile opponents of structural adjustment" to change political horses midstream and present their rendering of SAPs "as a panacea for Zambia' s economic problems… ordinary people showed open support for austerity. For example, at an MMD rally addressed by Chiluba in Kabwe in August 1990, Chiluba asked his audience if they would be prepared for sacrifices when the MMD came to power. They chanted 'YES.'" Of course, by embracing SAPs Chiluba and the MMD also ensured that they would be viewed favourably by the IMF and international finance community should they gain power.

Chiluba quotes a conversation he had with Jimmy Carter just before the election, "he says 'what you say today will matter tomorrow, you have to be very mindful every word you utter should have meaning.'" These words would come back to haunt Chiluba as his presidency unfolded. Two months after the election Chiluba called for a "celebration of praise", at State House at which he declared on national television that Zambia was a Christian nation. Phiri speculates that Chiluba's declaration was a personal commitment to God as president that he would lead Zambia guided by his principles based on his Christian faith. "One of my informants, Melu, felt that, as far as the president was concerned, the declaration of Zambia as a Christian nation was not a political statement… it was some thing he believed he needed to do." Phiri had previously stated that Chiluba "often draws little distinction between his personal religious faith and his public role as president". Gifford on the other hand sees the declaration as a chance by the Pentecostal and Evangelical Churches to gain an upper hand in politics in Zambia. "Following the announcement, there was general euphoria on the past of many born-agains." The ECZ and CCZ response was muted as they had not been consulted before the declaration. Gifford suggests, "Chiluba may have contacted officials of the EFZ, who no doubt were reluctant to bring in the other bodies because they saw this as their hour, having in the past felt themselves slightly overshadowed by the ECZ and CCZ."

Chiluba's patronage of the Evangelical wing of the church continued as he "appointed born-again pastors to government posts". "Chiluba was reported to have distributed 140 million kwacha to some of these churches during the 1996 election campaign in the hope of solidifying their political support. Chiluba has offered other perks to churches towards this end as well, including issuing diplomatic passports to clergy… and allocating building plots to churches." He and Godfrey Miyanda, who began as Minister without Portfolio and later became vice president, could be "found 'preaching' to church constituencies at mass rallies, church fund-raising events and Sunday church services", though Gifford notes of this latter practice "in Zambia, it would be hard for a President to do otherwise." Phiri also noted that "there was an influx of Christian missionaries into Zambia. New charismatic churches or church organisations increased." This is hardly surprising as the Pentecostal church in particular was keen to promote Chiluba's Christian nation. A video produced by Christian Vision talks of Chiluba in terms similar to the account of Joseph in Genesis saying, "this man who only a decade ago languished in a Zambian gaol has found God, found freedom, found the support of his people and has been voted president of his country by a massive majority. Shattering the chains of economic stagnation, of increasing poverty and spiritual darkness", and aimed to encourage Western Christians to invest money and skills into Zambia based on its status as a Christian nation.

It is clear that the motives for Chiluba's declaration are somewhat ambiguous. On one hand Chiluba was calling on God for divine blessing on Zambia at the declaration he quoted 2 Chron 7:14 saying "If my people who are called by my name will humble themselves and pray and seek my face and turn form their wicked ways, then I will hear from heaven and forgive their sin and will heal their land", and as Phiri speculates, "one of the reasons why Zambia was declared a Christian nation was Chiluba's belief that a nation whose leader fears God prospers economically. This interpretation of the Bible is heavily influenced by the US faith prosperity teachings that were gaining influence in Zambia, through missionaries, overseas contacts and increasingly by the means of mass media. "American sources and missionaries are systematically flooding the continent and forming a crucial, dynamic part of the African revival." Gifford comments, "the faith paradigm has become widely accepted as Christianity, and is staple fare on Zambian television."

Chiluba had an understanding of how Pentecostal churches view his presidency as God appointed. Rev. Sky Banda as senior Pentecostal pastor in the nation says of Chiluba, "when he finally got into the presidentship position we were very happy. We felt it was a God-ordained situation." Haynes proposes, "independent churches… theologically towards the conservative end of the religious spectrum, regarded government as divinely sanctioned, that they rule because God allows them to." By using scriptures such as Romans 13:1a, "Everyone must summit himself to the governing authorities, for there is no authority except that which God has established." Chiluba was confident he would be able to push his harsh economic policies through with little opposition from the Pentecostal wing of the church. An even more powerful inference in Pentecostal terms was that his presidency was like that of an Old Testament king. Using a scripture, "the Lord forbid that I should do such a thing to my master the Lord's anointed, or lift my hand against him; for he is the anointed of the Lord", 1 Sam 24:5, often appropriated by Pentecostal faith prosperity teachers to hide excesses in their ministry and prevent serious investigation, he and his supporters were able to fend off difficult questions from Pentecostal quarters, see also.

With this seemingly sound scriptural backing Chiluba was able to ask of his Christian supporters to endure hardships beyond those that brought the UNIP government of Kaunda to its knees. Calling once more on faith prosperity doctrines, "Chiluba admonished Christians to 'work hard and not to continue begging because there was not poverty in heaven'." Phiri questioned whether Chiluba's actions were in fact in keeping with his former beliefs as a trade unionist, "the characteristics of liberal democracy as understood by Chiluba were not put into practice when he declared Zambia a Christian nation." Because of his seemingly unassailable position the MMD threw themselves whole heartedly into an adjustment programme. Haynes comments that the programme "was so stringent that the local World Bank representative counselled caution and urged that greater concern be given to the issue of social instability, which he judged to be a direct result of too fervent an application of adjustment policies". The policy left many unemployed, raise the price of basic foods with the removal of subsidies (an action that had caused major riots under Kaunda) and increased the cost of education and healthcare. The application of this programme was to have a huge impact on the population and it was to finally cause a rift between Chiluba and the church. Phiri states it, "contributed to the worsening of the economic standards of 80 percent of Zambians". Once more as hardship threatened the population the church was compelled to take up an advocacy role instigating, "conflict between Chiluba and the churches… [due to] the social impact of his economic policies" This was a crucial moment in the relationship between Chiluba and the church because, "the sustainability of economic policies depends to a large extent of the balance of power between groups supporting and those against."

The surprise declaration of the Christian nation had already alienated the CCZ and ECZ and they became increasing less likely to fully support Chiluba just because he was a Christian. The declaration eventually estranged many of the women of Zambia, who had enthusiastically supported Chiluba in 1991, but later felt that he was "not gender sensitive and… wonder[ed] whether this had anything to do with the fact that Zambia… [had] been declared a Christian nation." Illustrating what Aboum suggests, "the relationship between the church and Women is contradictory. On the one had, the Church empowers women, and on the other, it has been slow in applying the revolutionary message of good news for women within its own structures." Put simply, "the Church has an empowering role, but a marginalising structure." As the economic hardships increased churches came under greater pressure both to provide welfare, but also because of financial hardships within their own organisations. "As Africa's economies have collapsed, many African churches have been reduced to a state of penury." Indeed, Zambia itself became increasingly reliant on outside AID. Though Christian nation status ensured that Christians in the west would be encouraged to donate more to see Zambia succeed, Zambia's poverty and debt burden increased dramatically during the 1990s. Chiluba's policies were causing the churches to distance themselves from him. "In March 1992 [the] EFZ… issued a statement in which it appealed to the Zambian church to 'restrict itself to those matters that are within its competence' and to 'maintain a reasonable distance form government'."

By 1996 the term Christian nation had been written into the opening of the proposed Zambian constitution. This took the debate from whether the declaration in 1991 was a personal statement or policy to a new level. As Phiri says it now, "had legal implications or a longer lasting nature than the Chiluba presidency." There were demands from opposition MPs and even a joint communiqué from the ECZ, CCZ and even the EFZ calling for a referendum, but, "Chiluba simply offered the constitution to Parliament to approve", and his confidence was rewarded when the MMD MPs holding a vast majority approved the wording. These actions along with others by Chiluba, including attempting to prevent Kaunda from running for president again, caused UNIP to boycott the forthcoming presidential elections.

Chiluba's perceived arrogance coupled with his failures to tackle the economic decline, poverty or corruption caused some pastors to conclude that what was lacking was suitably informed and educated Christians in politics to see the vision of a Christian nation through to its conclusion. Nevers Mumba, a Pentecostal pastor, and a key supporter of Chiluba in 1991 formed the National Christian's Coalition in 1996. Mumba claimed that this was not a political party, but just an organisation to "act as an independent voice in guiding the president in matters of concern to the church". However this caused great controversy among Christians, some of whom thought Mumba was in fact harbouring political ambitions to become president himself. Mumba challenged the integrity of Chiluba's government and in doing so caused Chiluba to see the NCC as a threat to his power. Under increasing pressure from within the NCC and increasing alienation by other political groups and churches Mumba converted the NCC into a political party and stood at the 1996 elections. The NCC however failed to win a seat. Chiluba was returned by 70% of the vote, but only 40% of the registered electorate turned out and only 60% of eligible electors had ever been registered. The absence of UNIP and voting irregularities caused many, including international observers, to question the validity of the election.

In his second term Chiluba continued to lose the confidence of the people of Zambia. In 1997 an attempted coup triggered the arrest of UNIP activists and the house arrest of Kenneth Kaunda. This brought down international condemnation on Chiluba. His separation from his wife Vera in 2000 caused many in church circles to question whether Chiluba's faith was what it once had been. And when Chiluba's demanded to stay on for a third term, despite the fact that it contradicted the constitution he had fought so hard to push through, it diminished his standing even further. In 1991, "Chiluba… promised the Christian community that power… [would] not corrupt his character", but this had an increasingly hollow ring to it. Gifford comments the make up of the MMD included a large number of Kaunda's regime who had jumped ship to keep their lucrative positions. "In 1994, Vice-President Levy Mwanamasa resigned, alleging Chiluba's government was corrupt." When opposed over his demand for a third term, "Chiluba reacted undemocratically by expelling twenty-two senior members of the MMD party, including Miyanda." On 3 May 2001 an attempt to impeach Chiluba was made to the Zambian parliament and backed by 158 MPs. The next day Chiluba, "announced 'I will leave office at the end of my term. Let's take national interests into consideration, this is in the best interest of the nation'… his presidency of Zambia as a Christian Nation ended with his reputation both as a Christian and as a democrat in ruins." He handed over power to the newly elected president Levy Mwanamasa, the leader of the MMD, in December 2001. In his first address to the Nation, the new president reaffirmed his commitment to the declaration of Zambia as a Christian nation.

Pentecostal churches have managed to distance themselves to such a degree they were largely unaffected by Chiluba's fall. The instigation of the NCC by Mumba provided many with a safe method of switching allegiances without abandoning the concept of the Christian nation. Phiri says of Zambian political affairs that it, "has not fallen into the pattern of one party that supports the Christian Nation, contesting with another party which opposes it. Zambian politics has come increasingly to be played out between supporters of the Christian Nation." Following Mwanamasa's election he called on Nevers Mumba to become vice president and in doing so conferred Pentecostal legitimacy on his government without the baggage that surrounded Chiluba. In many ways the Chiluba presidency has enabled the Pentecostal church to secure its voice in with the larger and more established churches in Zambia and among the urban populations in particular it is increasingly seen as one of the most active parts of civil society.

== See also ==
- Religion in Zambia
- Christianity in Africa
- Lumpa Church
- Kenneth Kaunda
- Frederick Chiluba
- Bibliography of the history of Zambia
