= Diocese of Solwezi =

Roman Catholic diocese in Zambia

Coordinates: 12.1846°S 26.3998°E

Diocese of Solwezi Dioecesis Solveziensis

Location
- Country: Zambia
- Metropolitan: Lusaka

Statistics
- Area: 88,300 km^{2} (34,100 sq mi)
- Population: Total; Catholics: (as of 2004); 682,191, 67,048 (9.8%)

Information
- Rite: Latin Rite
- Cathedral: St Daniel Cathedral

Current leadership
- Pope: Leo XIV
- Bishop: Charles Kasonde

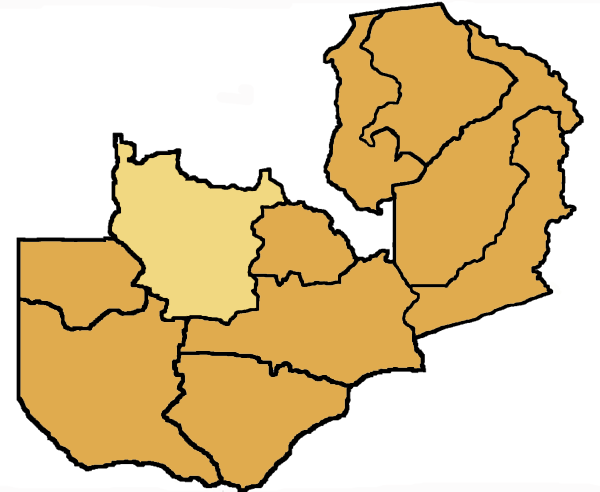
Map showing the location of the Roman Catholic Diocese of Solwezi in Zambia.

The Roman Catholic Diocese of Solwezi (Latin: Solvezien(sis)) is a diocese located in Solwezi in Zambia.

== History ==
- April 9, 1959: Established as Apostolic Prefecture of Solwezi from the Apostolic Vicariate of Ndola
- December 9, 1976: Promoted as Diocese of Solwezi

== Leadership ==
- Prefects Apostolic of Solwezi (Roman rite)
  - Fr. Rupert Hillerich, O.F.M. Conv. (1959 – 1969)
  - Fr. Anselm Myers, O.F.M. Conv. (1969 – 1970.06.09)
  - Fr. Severinah Abdon Potani, O.F.M. Conv. (Apostolic Administrator 1970.06.09 – 1976.12.09 see below)
- Bishops of Solwezi (Roman rite)
  - Bishop Severinah Abdon Potani, O.F.M. Conv. (see above 1976.12.09 – 1993.12.26)
  - Bishop Noel Charles O'Regan, S.M.A. (Apostolic Administrator 1994 – 1995.07.10); (1995.07.10 – 2004.10.01), appointed Bishop of Ndola; (Apostolic Administrator 2004.10.01 – 2007.05.30)
  - Bishop Alick Banda (2007.05.30 - 2009.11.13), appointed Coadjutor Bishop of Ndola
  - Bishop Charles Kasonde (since 2010.03.23)

== See also ==
- Roman Catholicism in Zambia

== Sources ==
- GCatholic.org
- Catholic Hierarchy
