= Archdiocese of Ndola =

Roman Catholic Archdiocese in Zambia

Coordinates: 12.9691°S 28.6397°E

Archdiocese of Ndola Archidioecesis Ndolaensis

Location
- Country: Zambia

Statistics
- Area: 32,000 km^{2} (12,000 sq mi)
- Population: Total; Catholics: (as of 2004); 2,000,000; 850,000 (42.5%)

Information
- Rite: Latin Rite

Current leadership
- Pope: Pope Francis
- Bishop: Archbishop Benjamin S. Phiri
- Bishops emeritus: Noel Charles O'Regan, S.M.A.

The Roman Catholic Archdiocese of Ndola (Latin: Ndolaën(sis)) is an Archdiocese located in Ndola, the third largest city in Zambia.

== History ==
- January 8, 1938: Established as Apostolic Prefecture of Ndola from the Apostolic Prefecture of Broken Hill
- January 13, 1949: Promoted as Apostolic Vicariate of Ndola
- April 25, 1959: Promoted as Diocese of Ndola
- June 18, 2024: Elevated as Archdiocese of Ndola

== Suffragan dioceses ==
- Kabwe
- Solwezi

== Bishops ==
- Prefect Apostolic of Ndola (Roman rite)
  - Fr. Francis Costantin Mazzieri, O.F.M. Conv. (1938 – 1949.01.13 see below)
- Vicar Apostolic of Ndola (Roman rite)
  - Bishop Francis Costantin Mazzieri, O.F.M. Conv. (see above 1949.01.13 – 1959.04.25 see below)
- Bishops of Ndola (Roman rite)
  - Bishop Francis Costantin Mazzieri, O.F.M. Conv. (see above 1959.04.25 – 1965.11.26)
  - Bishop Nicola Agnozzi, O.F.M. Conv. (1966.02.01 – 1975.07.10), resigned; later appointed Bishop of Ariano, Italy
  - Bishop Dennis Harold De Jong (1975.07.10 – 2003.09.17)
  - Bishop Noel Charles O'Regan, S.M.A. (2004.10.01 - 2010.01.16)
  - Bishop Alick Banda (2010.01.16 - 2018.01.30), appointed Archbishop of Lusaka and Apostolic Administrator here
  - Bishop Benjamin S. Phiri (2020.07.03 - 2024.06.18)
  - Archbishop Benjamin S. Phiri (Since 18 June 2024)

=== Coadjutor Bishop ===
- Alick Banda (2009-2010)

=== Auxiliary Bishop ===
- Nicola Agnozzi, O.F.M. Conv. (1962-1966), appointed Bishop here

=== Other priests of this diocese who became bishops ===
- Alick Banda, appointed Bishop of Solwezi in 2007; later returned here as Coadjutor
- Charles Joseph Sampa Kasonde, appointed Bishop of Solwezi in 2010

== See also ==
- Roman Catholicism in Zambia
