= Paul Francis Duffy =

Paul Francis Duffy OMI
- Bishop of Mongu
- Church: Catholic Church
- Diocese: Diocese of Mongu
- In office: June 14, 1997 – February 15, 2011
- Predecessor: Diocese erected
- Successor: Evans Chinyama Chinyemba

Orders
- Ordination: December 22, 1962 by Stephen Aloysius Leven
- Consecration: August 31, 1997 by Giuseppe Leanza

Personal details
- Born: July 25, 1932 Norwood, Massachusetts, United States
- Died: August 23, 2011 (aged 79) San Antonio, Texas, United States

Paul Francis Duffy, OMI (July 25, 1932 – August 23, 2011) was the first Catholic bishop of the Diocese of Mongu, Zambia.

Born in Norwood, Massachusetts, United States, Duffy was ordained to the priesthood in 1962. He joined the Missionary Oblates of Mary Immaculate in the USA in 1952 and was ordained priest on 22 December 1962.

He left for Zambia in 1982, working in Lukulu and Kalabo. In 1997, Duffy was appointed bishop of the Mongu Diocese, retiring in 2011. He died later that year in San Antonio Texas, USA, suffering from leukaemia.
