= Justin Mulenga =

Zambian Roman Catholic bishop (1955–2020)

- Bishop of Mpika
- Church: Catholic Church
- Diocese: Diocese of Mpika
- In office: 23 December 2015 – 20 March 2020
- Predecessor: Ignatius Chama
- Successor: Edwin Mwansa Mulandu

Orders
- Ordination: 18 July 1993
- Consecration: 12 March 2016 by Ignatius Chama

Personal details
- Born: 27 February 1955 Rosa Mission (north of Nseluka), Federation of Rhodesia and Nyasaland, British Empire
- Died: 20 March 2020 (aged 65) Lusaka, Zambia

Justin Mulenga (27 February 1955 – 20 March 2020) was a Zambian Roman Catholic bishop.

Mulenga was born in Zambia and was ordained to the priesthood in 1993. He served as bishop of the Roman Catholic Diocese of Mpika, Zambia, from 2017 until his death in 2020.
