= Nicola Agnozzi =

Italian prelate (1911–2008)

- Bishop of Diocese of Ariano (emeritus)
- Church: Roman Catholic Church
- See: Diocese of Ariano
- In office: 1976–1988
- Predecessor: Agapito Simeoni
- Successor: Antonio Forte
- Previous post(s): Priest

Orders
- Ordination: 18 March 1934

Personal details
- Born: 5 November 1911; Fermo, Italy
- Died: 17 February 2008 (aged 96)

Nicola Agnozzi (5 November 1911 – 17 February 2008) was an Italian prelate of the Roman Catholic Church.

== Biography ==
Agnozzi was born on 5 November 1911, in Fermo, and was ordained a priest on 18 March 1934 from the religious Order of Friars Minor Conventual. He was appointed auxiliary bishop of the Diocese of Ndola in Zambia, along with Titular Bishop of Adramyttium on 2 April 1962 and was appointed bishop on 1 July 1962. Agnozzi was appointed to bishop of the Diocese of Ndola on 1 February 1966 and resigned on 10 July 1975. On 24 March 1976, he was appointed to the Diocese of Ariano, as well as the Diocese of Lacedonia. He became bishop of the Diocese of Ariano Irpino-Lacedonia when the Ariano and Lacedonia dioceses were consolidated in 1986, retiring on 11 June 1988.

== See also ==
- Diocese of Ndola (Zambia)
- Diocese of Ariano
- Diocese of Lacedonia
