= Child Jesus Cathedral, Lusaka =

Coordinates: 15.41391°S 28.3152°E

Child Jesus Cathedral
- Child Jesus Cathedral
- Location: Lusaka
- Country: Zambia
- Denomination: Roman Catholic Church

The Child Jesus Cathedral or simply Cathedral of Lusaka, is a religious building of the Catholic Church which is located in the city of Lusaka the capital of the African country of Zambia. It is located near the Pope Square and Lusaka Airport.

The temple follows the Roman or Latin rite and functions as the headquarters of the Metropolitan Archdiocese of Lusaka (Archidioecesis Lusakensis) which was created in 1959 by the Bull "Cum fides christiana" of Pope John XXIII.

The cathedral was officially dedicated at a ceremony in 2006. Pope John Paul II celebrated a Mass at the site when it was just a clear field in 1989, and blessed the first stone of the building.

== See also ==
- Roman Catholicism in Zambia
- Child Jesus
