= Diocese of Chipata =

Roman Catholic diocese in Zambia

Coordinates: 13.6333°S 32.6571°E

Diocese of Chipata Dioecesis Chipatensis

Location
- Country: Zambia
- Metropolitan: Lusaka

Statistics
- Area: 69,106 km^{2} (26,682 sq mi)
- Population: Total; Catholics: (as of 2006); 1,381,000; 315,130 (22.8%)

Information
- Rite: Latin Rite

Current leadership
- Pope: Leo XIV
- Bishop: George Cosmas Zumaire Lungu

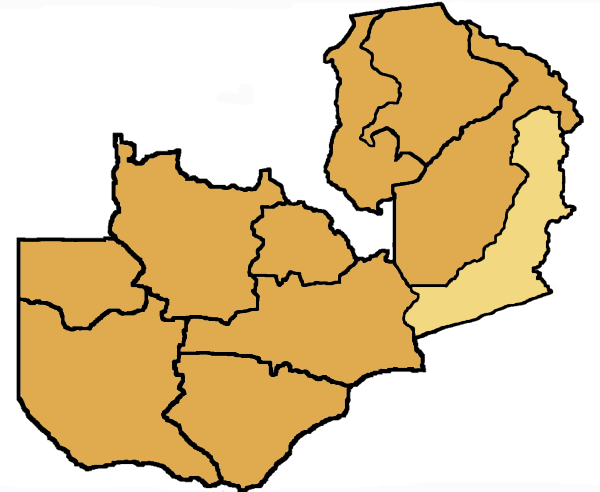
Map of the area controlled by the diocese of Chipata

The Roman Catholic Diocese of Chipata (Latin: Chipaten(sis)) is a diocese located in Chipata in Zambia.

== History ==
- July 1, 1937: Established as Apostolic Prefecture of Fort Jameson from the Apostolic Vicariate of Nyassa in Malawi
- May 7, 1953: Promoted as Apostolic Vicariate of Fort Jameson
- April 25, 1959: Promoted as Diocese of Fort Jameson
- April 15, 1968: Renamed as Diocese of Chipata

== Bishops ==
- Prefects Apostolic of Fort Jameson (Roman rite)
  - Fr. Fernand Martin, M. Afr. (1937.12.17 – 1946; Apostolic Administrator 1946 – 1947.03.07)
  - Fr. Firmin Courtemanche, M. Afr. (1947.03.07 – 1953.05.07 see below)
- Vicar Apostolic of Fort Jameson (Roman rite)
  - Bishop Firmin Courtemanche, M. Afr. (see above 1953.05.07 – 1959.04.25 see below)
- Bishops of Fort Jameson (Roman rite)
  - Bishop Firmin Courtemanche, M. Afr. (see above 1959.04.25 – 1968.04.15 see below)
- Bishops of Chipata (Roman rite)
  - Bishop Firmin Courtemanche, M. Afr. (see above 1968.04.15 – 1970.11.11)
  - Bishop Medardo Joseph Mazombwe (1970.11.11 – 1996.11.30), appointed Archbishop of Lusaka; future Cardinal
  - Bishop George Cosmas Zumaire Lungu (since 2002.12.23)

=== Auxiliary Bishop ===
- Benjamin S. Phiri (2011-2020), appointed Bishop of Ndola
- Gabriel Msipu Phiri (2023-present)

== See also ==
- Roman Catholicism in Zambia

== Sources ==
- GCatholic.org
- Catholic Hierarchy
