= Adam Kozłowiecki =

His Eminence Adam Kozłowiecki S.J.
- Cardinal-Priest of Sant'Andrea al Quirinale
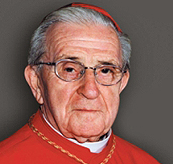
- Church: Roman Catholic Church
- Archdiocese: Lusaka
- Appointed: 21 February 1998
- Installed: 28 February 1998
- Successor: Odilo Scherer
- Previous posts: Apostolic Administrator of Lusaka (1950–55); Titular Bishop of Diospolis inferior (1955–59); Apostolic Vicar of Lusaka (1955–59); Archbishop of Lusaka (1959–69); President of the Zambian Episcopal Conference (1966–69); Titular Archbishop of Potenza Picena (1969–98)

Orders
- Ordination: 24 June 1937 by Karol Niemira
- Consecration: 11 September 1955 by James Robert Knox
- Created cardinal: 21 February 1998 by Pope John Paul II
- Rank: Cardinal-Priest

Personal details
- Born: Adam Kozłowiecki; 1 April 1911 Huta Komorowska, Austria-Hungary (modern-Poland)
- Died: 28 September 2007 (aged 96) Lusaka, Zambia
- Motto: In Nomine Domini

Styles of Adam Cardinal Kozłowiecki
- Reference style: His Eminence
- Spoken style: Your Eminence
- Informal style: Cardinal
- See: Lusaka (emeritus)

Cardinal Adam Kozłowiecki, S.J., (Polish pronunciation: [ˈadam kɔzwɔˈvjɛt͡skʲi]; 1 April 1911 – 28 September 2007) was a Jesuit priest who survived almost six years of captivity and torture in Nazi concentration camps during World War II, to become a missionary in Africa. He rose to the rank of Archbishop of the Archdiocese of Lusaka in Zambia. He was named a Cardinal-Priest by Pope John Paul II.

== Biography ==
Born in Huta Komorowska, Austria-Hungary, now part of Poland, into a family of noble descent, styled by the Ostoja coat of arms, Kozłowiecki was schooled first in the Jesuit College in Chyrów where he was later a monitor, and secondly in Poznań where he passed his school leaving exam. He was ordained priest on 24 June 1937 after completing his studies at Stara Wieś and the universities of Kraków and Lublin. His first vicariate was in the parish of Nowy Wiśnicz in Lesser Poland.

In November 1939 he and 24 confrères were arrested by the Gestapo in Kraków and sent to Auschwitz. Six months later he was transferred to the Dachau concentration camp, where he remained until the end of the war.

After his liberation, Kozłowiecki was granted his own request, by the Father General of the Society of Jesus, to go to Northern Rhodesia, where Polish Jesuits already had a mission. He taught there for several years until being appointed Apostolic Administrator of the new Prefecture of Lusaka in 1950. As the mission grew, he was named Bishop and Vicar Apostolic on 11 September 1955. In 1959 he was appointed the first Metropolitan Archbishop of Lusaka. He resigned from the see in 1969 so that an African could be appointed Archbishop.

He participated in all the sessions of the Second Vatican Council and in the first Synod of Bishops in 1967, and in the 1994 Special Assembly of the Synod of Bishops dedicated to Africa. After his resignation, he continued to serve as a missionary in Zambia. He was a member of the Congregation for the Evangelization of Peoples from 1970 to 1991.

He was created a Cardinal by John Paul II in the consistory of 21 February 1998; he was Cardinal-Priest of the Titulus S. Andreae in Quirinali. Because he reached 80 before becoming Cardinal, he was not eligible to participate in the 2005 conclave. He died on 28 September 2007.

The Cardinal received many recognitions, among them from President of Poland, Lech Kaczyński and a foundation and museum in his name.

== Published works in Polish ==
- Ucisk i strapienie. Pamiętnik więźnia 1939-1945, ed. I: Kraków 1967; ed. II: 2 vol., Kraków 1995; ed. III: Kraków 2008. A prisoner's diary during Nazi captivity.
- Listy z misyjnego frontu, ed. Ludwik Grzebień SJ and Wśród ludu Zambii, vol. 2, Kraków 1977. Correspondence from Africa.
- Moja Afryka, moje Chingombe. Dzieje misjonarza opisane w listach do przyjaciół, ed. Ludwik Grzebień, Kraków 1998. Letters to friends.

== Awards and memorials ==
- Commander of the Zambian Order of the Grand Companion of Freedom from President Kenneth Kaunda on 25 May 1985.
- Chevalier of the Legion d'honeur from the French state on 19 December 2006.
- The Grand Cordon of the Order of Merit of the Republic of Poland from President Lech Wałęsa on 5 April 1995.
- Grand Cross of the Order of Polonia Restituta, the highest possible national honour from President Lech Kaczyński on 24 May 2007.
- Commemorative plaque unveiled for Cardinal Adam Kozłowiecki (pol.). majdankrolewski.pl, 2008-10-03. [access date 2010-11-09].
- Honorary citizen of Majdan Królewski. majdankrolewski.pl. [access date 2016-07-11].
- The Adam Kozłowiecki Museum and Foundation, "Heart without Borders", was founded in his honour. deon.pl, 2011-09-24. [access date 2017-06-16]. Sandomierz. info.wiara.pl, 2008-03-27. [access date 2011-06-20].
- Recognition as a notable citizen of the Subcarpathian Voivodeship. bip.podkarpackie.pl. [access date 2017-12-15]. [archived (2017-06-16)].

== Bibliography ==
- Dąbrowski, Wincenty. "Kardynał Adam Kozłowiecki". Forum Polonijne (in Polish). 4 (2007): 33.

pap, ss: Zmarł kardynał Kozłowiecki (pol.). wprost.pl, 2007-09-28. [access date 2011-06-20].

- Sprawozdanie Dyrekcji Zakładu Naukowo-Wychowawczego OO. Jezuitów w Bąkowicach pod Chyrowem za rok szkolny 1936/37. Przemyśl: 1937, p. 12. Report from the Jesuit College in Chyrow 1936-7. Przemyśl: 1937 (in Polish)
- Sylwetka w słowniku biograficznym kardynałów Salvadora Mirandy
- Agata i Zbigniew Judyccy, Polonia. Słownik biograficzny, Warszawa 2000 (p. 155–156)
- Sketch in Catholic-Hierarchy.org
