= Diocese of Mpika =

Roman Catholic diocese in Zambia

Coordinates: 11.8314°S 31.4489°E

Diocese of Mpika Dioecesis Mpikaensis

Location
- Country: Zambia
- Ecclesiastical province: Kasama

Statistics
- Area: 86,135 km^{2} (33,257 sq mi)
- Population: Total; Catholics: (as of 2013); 535,000; 128,372 (24.0%)

Information
- Rite: Latin
- Cathedral: St. Joseph’s Cathedral

Current leadership
- Pope: Leo XIV
- Bishop: Edwin Mwansa Mulandu

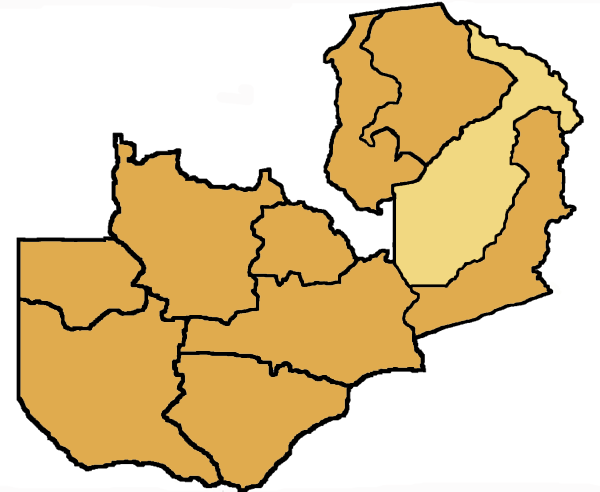
Map of the diocese’s location

The Roman Catholic Diocese of Mpika (Latin: Mpikaën(sis)) is a Latin Rite suffragan diocese in the ecclesiastical province of the Metropolitan Archbishop of Kasama, also in Zambia.

Its cathedral episcopal see is the Cathedral of St. Joseph the Worker, in the city of Mpika. It also has a former Cathedral, now Church of St. Maria Magdalena de Pazzi, in Ilondola, Zambia.

== History ==
- It was established on May 23, 1933 as Mission "sui iuris" of Lwangwa from the Apostolic Vicariate of Bangueolo
- On July 1, 1937 it was promoted as Apostolic Vicariate of Lwangwa (still exempt, but entitled to a titular bishop)
- Renamed on March 8, 1951 as Apostolic Vicariate of Abercorn
- On April 25, 1959 it was promoted as Diocese of Abercorn, losing its exempt status by joining the province of Kasama
- On November 22, 1967, it was renamed as Diocese of Mbala
- On April 26, 1991, renamed as Diocese of Mbala – Mpika
- Finally on September 9, 1994 it was renamed as Diocese of Mpika

== Missionary and Episcopal Ordinaries ==
All Roman rite; many missionary members of the Latin congregation White Fathers (M. Afr.)

Ecclesiastical superior of the Mission sui iuris of Lwangwa

- Father John van Sambeek, M. Afr. (1933.05.23 – 1936.11.19), later Titular Bishop of Gergis (1936.11.19 – 1953.03.25) & Apostolic Vicar of Tanganyika (Tanzania) (1936.11.19 – 1946.05.10), Apostolic Vicar of Kigoma (Tanzania) (1946.05.10 – 1953.03.25), promoted first Bishop of Kigoma (1953.03.25 – 1957.11.22), emeritate as Titular Bishop of Tracula (1957.11.22 – 1966.12.25)

Apostolic Vicars of Lwangwa

- Heinrich Horst, M. Afr., Titular Bishop of Hermonthis (1938.05.21 – death 1946)
- Joost Van den Biesen, M. Afr., Titular Bishop of Tullia (see) (1948.02.12 – 1951.03.08 see below)

Apostolic Vicars of Abercorn

- Joost Van den Biesen, M. Afr. (see above 1951.03.08 – retired 1958.01.24; Lay state 1967)
- Adolf Fürstenberg, M. Afr. (1958.12.11 – 1959.04.25 see below), Titular Bishop of Termessus (1958.12.11 – 1959.04.25)

Suffragan Bishop of Abercorn

- Adolf Fürstenberg, M. Afr. (see above 1959.04.25 – 1967.11.22 see below)

Suffragan Bishops of Mbala

- Adolf Fürstenberg, M. Afr. (see above 1967.11.22 – retired 1987.03.07)
- Telesphore George Mpundu (1987.03.07 – 1991.04.26 see below)

Suffragan Bishop of Mbala – Mpika

- Telesphore George Mpundu (see above 1991.04.26 – 1994.09.09 see below)

Suffragan Bishops of Mpika

- Telesphore George Mpundu (see above 1994.09.09 – 2004.10.01), later Coadiutor Archbishop of Lusaka (2004.10.01 – 2006.10.28) and Metropolitan of Lusaka (2006.10.28 – 2018.01.30),

President of Zambia Episcopal Conference (2014.07 – 2018.01.30)

- Apostolic Administrator Father Robert Lavertu, M. Afr. (2007.09 – 2008.07.17) (no other office)
- Ignatius Chama (2008.07.17 - 2012.01.12 see below)
- Apostolic administrator Ignatius Chama, Metropolitan of Kasama (see above 2012.01.12 – ...):)
- Justin Mulenga (2015.12.23 – 2020.03.20)
- Edwin Mwansa Mulandu (2021.04.24 – ...)

== See also ==
- Roman Catholicism in Zambia

== Source and External links ==
- GCatholic.org, with incumbent biography links
- Catholic Hierarchy
- Diocese of Mpika website
