= Edwin Mwansa Mulandu =

Zambian Roman Catholic prelate (born 1969)

- Bishop of Mpika, Zambia
- Church: Catholic Church
- Archdiocese: Roman Catholic Archdiocese of Kasama
- See: Roman Catholic Diocese of Mpika
- Appointed: 24 April 2021
- Predecessor: Justin Mulenga
- Successor: Incumbent

Orders
- Ordination: 4 August 2001
- Consecration: 3 July 2021 by Gianfranco Gallone
- Rank: Bishop

Personal details
- Born: Mwansa Mulandu; July 15, 1969 (age 56) Mufulira, Mufulira District, Archdiocese of Ndola, Zambia
- Motto: "Ecce ego mitte me" (Here I am, send me)

Styles of Edwin Mwansa Mulandu
- Reference style: His Lordship; The Most Reverend
- Spoken style: Your Lordship
- Religious style: Bishop

Edwin Mwansa Mulandu (born 15 July 1969) is a Zambian Catholic bishop who serves as Bishop of the Diocese of Mpika. He was appointed Bishop of Mpika on 24 April 2021 by Pope Francis.

== Background and education ==
Mulandu was born on 15 July 1969, in the town of Mufulira, Mufulira District, in the Archdiocese of Ndola. He attended primary school and middle school in his home area. He completed high school at Emmaus Spirituality Centre, a Junior Seminary in Mpika.

He pursued his priestly studies at St. Augustine's Major Seminary in Mpika, Zambia. He graduated with a diploma in philosophy from there in 1994. He continued his education at St. Dominic's Major Seminary in Lusaka, where he graduated with a bachelor's degree. Later, the Pontifical Urban University in Rome awarded him a Bachelor of Divinity. He also holds a master's degree in applied ethics awarded by St Augustine College of South Africa, in 2011. He attended a BPP Course in Dublin, Ireland between 2005 and 2007. He is a Licentiate Member of the Zambia Institute of Chartered Accountants (ZICA).

== Priesthood ==
He was ordained a priest on 4 August 2001. He served as a priest of the Diocese of Ndola until 24 April 2021.

While priest of Ndola, he served in various roles, including as (a) parish vicar in Masala Parish from 2001 until 2004 (b) diocesan bursar in Ndola Diocese from 2001 until 2005 (c) parish priest of the Christ the King Cathedral, from 2004 until 2005 (d) parish priest of Saint Michael's in Kalulushi from 2007 until 2010 (e) lecturer and bursar at Zambia Catholic University, from 2007 until 2013 (f) parish priest of St Peter's, Kitwe Parish from 2013 until 2015 (g) vicar forane of the Deanery of Kamfinsa and (h) member of the Presbyteral Council and the College of Consultors in Ndola from 2014 until 2015. Until his appointment as bishop, he was serving as national director of the Pontifical Mission Societies in Zambia.

== As bishop ==
Father Edwin Mwansa Mulandu was appointed bishop of the Diocese of Mpika on 24 April 2021 and received episcopal consecration at Child Jesus Cathedral, Lusaka, Archdiocese of Lusaka on 3 July 2021 at the hands of Archbishop Gianfranco Gallone, titular archbishop of Motula and papal nucio, assisted by Archbishop Ignatius Chama, archbishop of Kasama and Archbishop Alick Banda, archbishop of Lusaka.

== See also ==
- Telesphore George Mpundu
- Catholic Church in Zambia

Catholic Church titles
Preceded by Justin Mulenga† (23 December 2015 - 20 March 2020)	Bishop of Mpika (since 24 April 2021)	Succeeded by Incumbent
