= Mufulira District =

Coordinates: 12°30′S 28°15′E

- District
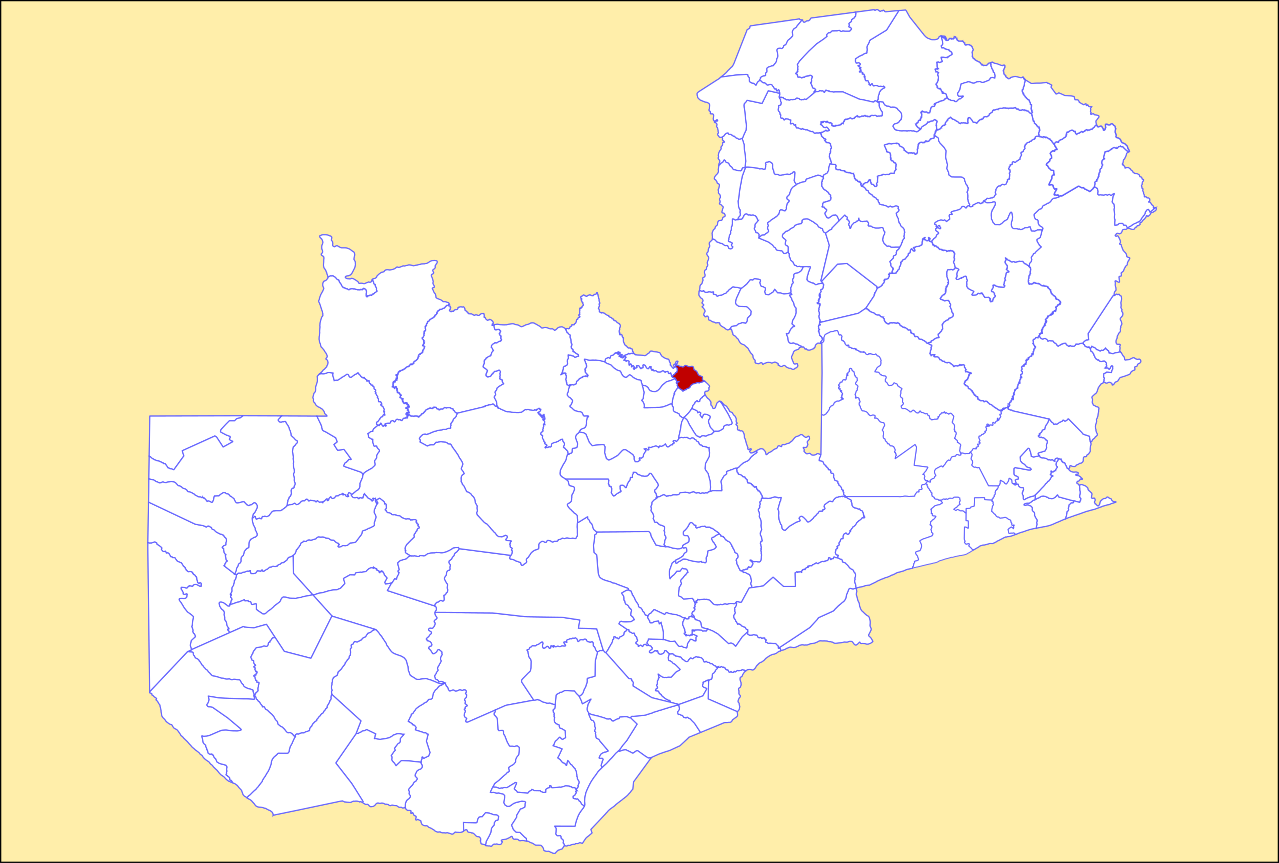
- District location in Zambia
- Country: Zambia
- Province: Copperbelt Province
- Capital: Mufulira

Area
  - Total: 1,279.2 km^{2} (493.9 sq mi)

Population (2022)
  - Total: 200,182
  - Density: 156.49/km^{2} (405.31/sq mi)
- Time zone: UTC+2 (CAT)

Mufulira District is a district of Zambia, located in Copperbelt Province. The capital lies at Mufulira. As of the 2022 Zambian Census, the district had a population of 200,182 people. It is divided into three constituencies, namely Mufulira, Kantanshi and Kankoyo.
