= Zambia Conference of Catholic Bishops =

Assembly of Catholic bishops

The Zambia Conference of Catholic Bishops, known before 2016 as the Zambia Episcopal Conference (ZEC) was established in 1965. The statutes of the Conference were approved by the Holy See on April 2, 1984. The ZCCB is a member of the Association of Member Episcopal Conferences in Eastern Africa (AMECEA) and Symposium of Episcopal Conferences of Africa and Madagascar (SECAM).

List of presidents of the Bishops' Conference:

1966-1969: Adam Kozlowiecki, archbishop of Lusaka

1969-1972: James Corboy, Bishop of Monze

1972-1975: Medardo Joseph Mazombwe, Bishop of Chipata

1975-1977: Elias White Mutale, Archbishop of Kasama

1977-1984: Dennis Harold De Jong, Bishop of Ndola

1984-1988: James Mwewa Spaita, Bishop of Mansa

1988-1990: Medardo Joseph Mazombwe, Bishop of Chipata

1990-1993: Dennis Harold De Jong, Bishop of Ndola

1993-1999: Telesphore George Mpundu, Bishop of Mpika

1999-2002: Medardo Joseph Mazombwe, archbishop of Lusaka

2002-2008: Telesphore George Mpundu, Bishop of Mpika and then archbishop of Lusaka

2008 - ... George Cosmas Zumaire Lungu, Bishop of Chipata
