= Telesphore George Mpundu =

Zambian Catholic prelate (1947–2026)

The Most Reverend Telesphore George Mpundu
- Archbishop of Lusaka
- Church: Catholic
- Archdiocese: Lusaka
- Appointed: 1 October 2004 (as Coadjutor)
- Installed: 28 October 2006
- Term ended: 30 January 2018
- Predecessor: Medardo Joseph Mazombwe
- Successor: Alick Banda
- Previous post: Bishop of Mbala (1987–2004)

Orders
- Ordination: 17 December 1972
- Consecration: 21 June 1987 by Adolf Fürstenberg, Elias White Mutale, and Adrian Mung'andu

Personal details
- Born: 21 May 1947 Kopeka, Mpulungu District, Northern Rhodesia
- Died: 15 May 2026 (aged 78) Lusaka, Zambia

Telesphore George Mpundu (21 May 1947 – 15 May 2026) was a Zambian Catholic prelate who served as the Archbishop of Lusaka from 2006 to 2018. He also previously served as Coadjutor Archbishop from 2004 to 2006.

In 2024, he was subsequently excommunicated after consecrating Anthony Ward of the Servants of the Holy Family as bishop without Vatican approval.

== Early life and education ==
Mpundu was born on 21 May 1947 at Kopeka, Mpulungu District, in the Diocese of Mbala, in the Northern Province of Zambia.

== Priesthood ==
Mpundu was ordained a priest on 17 December 1972. He served as priest of Mbala until 17 March 1987.

== Episcopal service ==
=== Diocese of Mbala ===
Pope John Paul II appointed him as Bishop of Mbala on 7 March 1987, and he was installed there on 21 June 1987. He was consecrated as bishop by Bishop Johann Adolf von Fürstenberg, Bishop Emeritus of Mbala, assisted by Elias White Mutale, Archbishop of Kasama and Adrian Mung'andu, Archbishop of Lusaka.

=== Archdiocese of Lusaka ===
On 1 October 2004 Pope John Paul II again appointed him as Coadjutor Archbishop of Lusaka, Zambia.

On the order of Pope Benedict XVI, Mpundu succeeded as the Archbishop of Lusaka, Zambia, on 28 October 2006, upon the retirement of his predecessor, Archbishop Medardo Joseph Mazombwe. Mpundu resigned on 30 January 2018.

Mpundu served for at last two consecutive terms as the president of the Zambia Conference of Catholic Bishops (ZCCB).

=== Excommunication, death, and funeral ===
In 2024, Mpundu consecrated Anthony Ward, the founder of the Servants of the Holy Family, as a bishop. This action took place without approval of the Holy See, which led him to incur the canonical penalty of excommunication latae sententiae.

Mpundu died on 15 May 2026, at the age of 78, while receiving treatment at Maina Soko Medical Centre in Lusaka.

The official funeral Mass was held on 21 May 2026, at the Cathedral of the Child Jesus in Lusaka. It was broadcast live across various digital media channels. President Hakainde Hichilema attended the Mass to pay his respects. The main celebrant, Archbishop of Lusaka Alick Banda, highly praised Mpundu’s legacy. He described him as a "voice for the voiceless" who spoke boldly against corruption, bad governance, and dictatorial tendencies, even when it made those in power uncomfortable. His canonical penalty of excommunication was not mentioned. Following the Mass, Mpundu was laid to rest in a private burial ceremony at the cathedral, attended by close family members and the clergy.

== See also ==
- Catholic Church in Zambia
- Edwin Mwansa Mulandu

Catholic Church titles
Preceded by Medardo Joseph Mazombwe †	Archbishop of Lusaka; 2004–2018	Succeeded by Alick Banda
Preceded by Adolf Fürstenberg, M. Afr. †	Bishop of Mbala; 1987–2004	Succeeded by Ignatius Chama
