= Medardo Joseph Mazombwe =

His Eminence Medardo Joseph Mazombwe
- Archbishop Emeritus of Lusaka
- Archdiocese: Lusaka
- See: Lusaka
- Appointed: 30 November 1996
- Term ended: 28 October 2006
- Predecessor: Adrian Mung'andu
- Successor: Telesphore George Mpundu
- Other post: Cardinal-Priest of Santa Emerenziana a Tor Fiorenza (2010-13)
- Previous posts: Bishop of Chipata (1970-96); President of the Zambian Episcopal Conference (1972-75; 1988-90; 1999-2002); President of the Association of Member Episcopal Conferences in Eastern Africa (1979-86)

Orders
- Ordination: 4 September 1960
- Consecration: 7 February 1971 by Emmanuel Milingo, Firmin Courtemanche, M. Afr., and James Corboy, S.J.
- Created cardinal: 20 November 2010 by Pope Benedict XVI
- Rank: Cardinal-Priest

Personal details
- Born: Medardo Joseph Mazombwe; 24 September 1931 Chundamira, Zambia
- Died: 29 August 2013 (aged 81) Lusaka, Zambia
- Buried: Lusaka Cathedral
- Parents: Joseph Adrian Mazombwe; Eugenia Phiri
- Education: University of Lusaka

Ordination history of Medardo Joseph Mazombwe
History
Episcopal consecration
- Principal consecrator: Emmanuel Milingo
- Co-consecrators: Firmin Courtemanche, M. Afr., and James Corboy, S.J.
Episcopal succession
Bishops consecrated by Medardo Joseph Mazombwe as principal consecrator
- Benjamin S. Phiri: 9 April 2011
- Evans Chinyama Chinyemba, O.M.I.: 28 May 2011

Medardo Joseph Mazombwe (24 September 1931 – 29 August 2013) was a cardinal of the Catholic Church. He was Zambia's first indigenous cardinal.

He was the former archbishop of the Roman Catholic Archdiocese of Lusaka (1996–2006) and Bishop of the Roman Catholic Diocese of Chipata (1970–1996).

Pope Benedict XVI elevated Mazombwe to the status of Cardinal-Priest of Santa Emerenziana a Tor Fiorenza at a consistory on 20 November 2010.

He held several senior positions in the local and regional church, such as Zambia Episcopal Conference president (1972–1975; 1988–1990; 1999–2002), and as chairman of the regional conferences under Association of Member Episcopal Conferences in Eastern Africa (A.M.E.C.E.A.) (1979–86). He was an ardent campaigner for Zambia's debt cancellation in the mid-1980s, through the Jubilee movement campaign and spearheaded several new developmental projects in many parts of the country including the Mumpanshya area of Chongwe.

== Legacy ==
After his death, a foundation and a school were named after him in Chipata.
