= Catholic Church in Zambia =

The Catholic Church in Zambia is part of the worldwide Catholic Church, under the spiritual leadership of the Pope in Rome.

The 2022 census found that 98.0% of Zambian population are Christian, while 17.9% from Zambian population identified as Catholic.

Figures in 2020 suggested that 85% of the country had a Christian background, with 34% following Protestantism and 32% following Catholicism. Other figures noted that there are almost 1,000 priests and over 2,000 serving almost 400 parishes.

== History ==
The first missionaries to arrive in Zambia were the Portuguese Dominicans in 1730. Later on, the first Jesuits in the country crossed the Zambezi River near Victoria Falls in 1879. Jesuit missions were established among the Tonga in 1902 and at Broken Hill in 1927. The White Fathers, entering from the north in 1891, had greater success in what is now Northern and Luapula Province. Permanent Catholic stations on the Copperbelt were provided by Italian Franciscans in 1931. In May 1959 Lusaka became a diocese, and later Kasama also became one. Some media outlets, such as Radio Icengelo and the National Mirror, are linked to the church, which has championed social justice issues and the early pro-democracy movement of the 1980s. For further details see History of Church activities in Zambia.

== Dioceses ==
There are 3 Archdioceses and 8 dioceses in Zambia in 2024.

- Kasama
  - Mansa
  - Mpika
- Lusaka
  - Chipata
  - Livingstone
  - Mongu
  - Monze
- Ndola
  - Kabwe
  - Solwezi

== See also ==
- Religion in Zambia
- Christianity in Zambia
- Bibliography of the history of Zambia
