= Archdiocese of Lusaka =

Roman Catholic archdiocese in Zambia

Coordinates: 15°24′50″S 28°18′54″E

Archdiocese of Lusaka Archidioecesis Lusakensis

Location
- Country: Zambia

Statistics
- Area: 35,000 km^{2} (14,000 sq mi)
- Population: Total; Catholics: 3,310,000; 1,171,000 (35.4%)
- Parishes: 60

Information
- Denomination: Catholic Church
- Sui iuris church: Latin Church
- Rite: Roman Rite
- Cathedral: Child Jesus Cathedral
- Secular priests: 81

Current leadership
- Pope: Leo XIV
- Archbishop: Alick Banda

The Archdiocese of Lusaka (Archidioecesis Lusakensis) is a Latin Church ecclesiastical territory or archdiocese of the Catholic Church in Zambia, where it is also considered its national primatial see.

Its cathedral episcopal see is Cathedral of the Child Jesus, in the national capital Lusaka.

== Statistics ==
As of 2015, the archdiocese pastorally served 1,171,000 Catholics (35.4% of 3,310,000 total) on an area of 64,000 km^{2} (24,720 mi^{2}), subdivided into 60 parishes and 86 missions, administered by 235 priests (81 diocesan, 154 religious), 1,300 lay religious (327 brothers, 973 sisters) and 37 seminarians.

== Ecclesiastical province ==
The Metropolitan archdiocese has the following suffragan sees :

- Roman Catholic Diocese of Chipata
- Roman Catholic Diocese of Livingstone, its daughter
- Roman Catholic Diocese of Mongu
- Roman Catholic Diocese of Monze, its daughter

== History ==
- Established on 1927.07.14 as Apostolic Prefecture of Broken Hill / de Broken Hill (Latin) (from Apostolic Prefecture of Zambese)
- Lost territories on 1936.05.25 to establish Apostolic Prefecture of Victoria Falls (now its suffragan diocese Livingstone) and on 1938.01.08 to establish Apostolic Prefecture of Ndola
- Renamed on 1946.06.13 after its see as Apostolic Prefecture of Lusaka / Lusaken(sis) (Latin)
- Promoted on 1950.07.14 as Apostolic Vicariate of Lusaka / Lusaken(sis) (Latin)
- Promoted on 1959.04.25 as Metropolitan Archdiocese of Lusaka / Lusaken(sis) (Latin)
- Enjoyed a Papal visit from Pope John Paul II in May 1989.
- Lost territories on 1962.03.10 to establish Diocese of Monze and on 2011.10.29 to establish Diocese of Kabwe, both as its suffragans.

== Bishops ==
=== Ordinaries ===
==== Missionary Ordinaries ====
Apostolic Prefect of Broken Hill

- Father Bruno Wolnik, Society of Jesus (Jesuits, S.J.) (1927 - 13 June 1946 see below)

Apostolic Prefect of Lusaka

- Father Bruno Wolnik, S.J. (13 June 1946 see above - resigned 1950)

Apostolic Vicars of Lusaka
- Apostolic Administrator Father Adam Kozłowiecki, S.J. (1950.07.15 - 4 June 1955 see below); future Cardinal
- Bishop Adam Kozłowiecki, S.J. (4 June 1955 see above - 25 April 1959 see below), Titular Bishop of Diospolis inferior (1955.06.04 – 1959.04.25); future Cardinal

==== Diocesan Ordinaries ====
Metropolitan Archbishops of Lusaka

- Archbishop Adam Kozłowiecki, Society of Jesus (25 April 1959 see above: see promoted - 29 May 1969 Resigned), also President of Zambia Episcopal Conference (1966 – 1969); next Titular Archbishop of Potenza Picena as emeritate (1969.05.29 – 1998.02.21), created Cardinal-Priest of S. Andrea al Quirinale (1998.02.21 [1998.02.28] – death 2007.09.28)
- Archbishop Emmanuel Milingo (29 May 1969 - 6 August 1983 Resigned), reduced to Lay state on 2009.12.17
  - Apostolic Administrator Elias White Mutale (1983 - 9 January 1984 Resigned), while Metropolitan Archbishop of Kasama (Zambia) (1973.09.17 – death 1990.02.12); previously Bishop of Mansa (Zambia) (1971.07.03 – 1973.09.17), President of Zambia Episcopal Conference (1975 – 1977)
- Archbishop Adrian Mung'andu (9 Jan 1984 - 30 Nov 1996 Retired), died 2007; previously Bishop of Livingstone (Zambia) (1974.11.18 – 1984.01.09)
- Archbishop Medardo Joseph Mazombwe (30 Nov 1996 - 28 Oct 2006 Retired), also President of Zambia Episcopal Conference (1999 – 2002); previously Bishop of Chipata (Zambia) (1970.11.11 – 1996.11.30), President of Zambia Episcopal Conference (1972 – 1975 & 1988 – 1990), President of Association of Member Episcopal Conferences in Eastern Africa (1979 – 1986); created Cardinal-Priest of S. Emerenziana a Tor Fiorenza (2010.11.20 [2011.03.26] – death 2013.08.29)
- Archbishop Telesphore George Mpundu (28 Oct 2006 - 30 Jan 2018 Resigned), also President of Zambia Episcopal Conference (2002 – 2008.02), President of Zambia Conference of Catholic Bishops (2014.07 – 2018.01.30); previously Bishop of Mbala (Zambia) (1987.03.07 – 1991.04.26) restyled Bishop of Mbala–Mpika (Zambia) (1991.04.26 – 1994.09.09), President of Zambia Episcopal Conference (1993 – 1999), restyled Bishop of Mpika (Zambia) (1994.09.09 – 2004.10.01), Coadjutor Archbishop of Lusaka (Zambia) (2004.10.01 – succession 2006.10.28)
- Archbishop Alick Banda (2018.01.30 – ...); previously Bishop of Solwezi (Zambia) (2007.05.30 – 2009.11.14), Coadjutor Bishop of Ndola (Zambia) (2009.11.14 – 2010.01.16), Apostolic Administrator of Solwezi (Zambia) (2009.11.14 – 2010.02.13), Bishop of Ndola (Zambia) (2010.01.16 succeeding – 2018.01.30), Vice-President of Zambia Conference of Catholic Bishops (2014.07 – 2017.11.11).

=== Coadjutor Archbishop ===
- Telesphore George Mpundu (2004-2006)

=== Other priest of this diocese who became bishop ===
- Moses Hamungole, appointed Bishop of Monze in 2014

== Sources and External links ==
- GCatholic, with Google JQ satellite picture - data for all sections
