= List of participants at the Third Extraordinary General Assembly of the Synod of Bishops =

In addition to Pope Francis, who served as president of the Third Extraordinary General Assembly of the Synod of Bishops, which met on 5–19 October 2014, there were 15 other classes of participants. Cardinal Lorenzo Baldisseri served as Secretary General, Cardinal Péter Erdő was the Relator General, and Archbishop Bruno Forte was the Special Secretary. The delegate presidents Cardinals André Vingt-Trois, Luis Antonio G. Tagle, and Raymundo Damasceno Assis. The Commission for the Message had Cardinal Gianfranco Ravasi as president and Archbishop Víctor Manuel Fernández as secretary. Bishop Fabio Fabene, undersecretary of the Synod of Bishops, also participated.

== Eastern Catholic Churches ==
The Eastern Catholic Churches were represented by

Name	See	Church	Country
Patriarch Nerses Bedros XIX Tarmouni	Cilicia	Armenian Catholic Church	Lebanon
Exarch Christo Proykov	Sofia	Bulgarian Greek Catholic Church	Bulgaria
Patriarch Louis Raphaël I Sako	Babylon	Chaldean Catholic Church	Iraq
Patriarch Ibrahim Isaac Sidrak	Alexandria	Coptic Catholic Church	Egypt
Cardinal Berhaneyesus Souraphiel	Addis Ababa	Ethiopian Catholic Church	Ethiopia
Patriarch Gregory III Laham, BS	Antioch	Melkite Greek Catholic Church	Israel
Cardinal Lucian Mureșan	Făgăraș and Alba Iulia	Romanian Greek Catholic Church	Romania
Archeparch William C. Skurla	Pittsburgh	Ruthenian Greek Catholic Church	United States
Archeparch Ján Babjak, SJ	Prešov	Slovak Greek Catholic Church	Slovakia
Cardinal Patriarch Bechara Boutros al-Rahi	Antioch	Syriac Maronite Church	Lebanon
Patriarch Ignatius Joseph III Yonan	Antioch	Syriac Catholic Church	Israel
Major Archbishop George Alencherry	Ernakulam-Angamaly	Syro-Malabar Catholic Church	India
Major Archbishop Baselios Cleemis	Trivandrum	Syro-Malankara Catholic Church	India
Major Archbishop Sviatoslav Shevchuk	Kiev–Galicia	Ukrainian Greek Catholic Church	Ukraine

== Representatives of episcopal conferences ==
The Synod statues provided for the heads of 114 episcopal conferences to participate as voting delegates.

=== Africa ===
Name	See	Episcopal conference	Country
Archbishop Gabriel Mbilingi	Lubango	Episcopal Conference of Angola and São Tomé	Angola
Bishop Eugène Cyrille Houndékon	Abomey	Episcopal Conference of Benin	Benin
Archbishop Paul Yembuado Ouédaraogo	Bobo-Dioulasso	Conference of Bishops of Burkina Faso and of Niger	Burkina Faso
Bishop Gervais Banshimiyubusa	Ngozi	Conference of Catholic Bishops of Burundi	Burundi
Archbishop Samuel Kleda	Douala	National Episcopal Conference of Cameroon	Cameroon
Cardinal Dieudonné Nzapalainga, CSSp	Bangui	Central African Episcopal Conference	Central African Republic
Bishop Jean-Claude Bouchard, OMI	Pala	Episcopal Conference of Chad	Chad
Bishop Louis Portella Mbuyu	Kinkala	Episcopal Conference of the Congo	Congo
Bishop Nicolas Djomo Lola	Tshumbe	Episcopal Conference of the Democratic Republic of the Congo	DR Congo
Bishop Alexis Touabli Youlo	Agboville	Episcopal Conference of the Côte d'Ivoire	Ivory Coast
Bishop Juan Matogo Oyana, CMF	Bata	Episcopal Conference of Equatorial Guinea	Equatorial Guinea
Archeparch Berhaneyesus Souraphiel, CM	Addis Ababa	Assembly of Catholic Hierarchs of Ethiopia and Eritrea	Ethiopia
Bishop Mathieu Madega Lebouakehan	Mouila	Episcopal Conference of Gabon	Gabon
Bishop Joseph Osei-Bonsu	Konongo–Mampong	Ghana Catholic Bishops' Conference	Ghana
Bishop Emmanuel Félémou	Kankan	Episcopal Conference of Guinea	Guinea
Cardinal John Njue	Nairobi	Kenyan Episcopal Conference	Kenya
Archbishop Gerard Tlali Lerotholi, OMI	Maseru	Lesotho Catholic Bishops' Conference	Lesotho
Bishop Anthony Fallah Borwah	Gbarnga	Catholic Bishops' Conference of Liberia	Liberia
Archbishop Désiré Tsarahazana	Toamasina	Episcopal Conference of Madagascar	Madagascar
Bishop Joseph Mukasa Zuza	Mzuzu	Episcopal Conference of Malawi	Malawi
Bishop Jean-Baptiste Tiama	Sikasso	Episcopal Conference of Mali	Mali
Bishop Maurice Piat, CSSp	Port Louis	Episcopal Conference of the Indian Ocean	Mauritius
Archbishop Vincent Landel, SCI de Béth	Rabat	Regional Episcopal Conference of North Africa	Morocco
Bishop Lucio Andrice Muandula	Xai-Xai	Episcopal Conference of Mozambique	Mozambique
Archbishop Liborius Nashenda, OMI	Windhoek	Namibian Catholic Bishops' Conference	Namibia
Archbishop Ignatius Ayau Kaigama	Jos	Catholic Bishops' Conference of Nigeria	Nigeria
Bishop Smaragde Mbonyintege	Kabgayi	Conference of Catholic Bishops of Rwanda	Rwanda
Archbishop Benjamin Ndiaye	Dakar	Conference of Bishops of Senegal, Mauritania, Cape Verde, and Guinea Bissau	Senegal
Bishop Patrick Daniel Koroma	Kenema	Inter-territorial Catholic Bishops' Conference of The Gambia and Sierra Leone	Sierra Leone
Archbishop Stephen Brislin	Cape Town	Southern African Catholic Bishops' Conference	South Africa
Cardinal Gabriel Zubeir Wako	Khartoum	Sudan Catholic Bishops' Conference	Sudan
Bishop Tarcisius Ngalalekumtwa	Iringa	Tanzania Episcopal Conference	Tanzania
Bishop Benoît Comlan Messan Alowonou	Kpalimé	Episcopal Conference of Togo	Togo
Archbishop John Baptist Odama	Gulu	Uganda Episcopal Conference	Uganda
Archbishop Ignatius Chama	Kasama	Zambia Episcopal Conference	Zambia
Bishop Michael Dixon Bhasera	Masvingo	Zimbabwe Catholic Bishops' Conference	Zimbabwe

=== The Americas ===
Name	See	Episcopal conference	Country
Archbishop José María Arancedo	Santa Fe de la Vera Cruz	Argentine Episcopal Conference	Argentina
Archbishop Patrick Pinder	Nassau	Antilles Episcopal Conference	Bahamas
Archbishop Oscar Omar Aparicio Céspedes	Military Ordinariate of Bolivia	Bolivian Episcopal Conference	Bolivia
Cardinal Raymundo Damasceno Assis	Aparecida	National Conference of Bishops of Brazil	Brazil
Archbishop Paul-André Durocher	Gatineau	Canadian Conference of Catholic Bishops	Canada
Cardinal Ricardo Ezzati Andrello	Santiago de Chile	Episcopal Conference of Chile	Chile
Archbishop Luis Augusto Catro Quiroga, IMC	Tunja	Episcopal Conference of Colombia	Colombia
Bishop Oscar Gerardo Fernández Guillén	Puntarenas	Episcopal Conference of Costa Rica	Costa Rica
Archbishop Dionisio Guillermo García Ibáñez	Santiago de Cuba	Conference of Catholic Bishops of Cuba	Cuba
Bishop Gregorio Nicanor Peña Rodríguez	Nuestra Señora de la Altagracia in Higüey	Conference of the Dominican Episcopate	Dominican Republic
Archbishop Fausto Gabriel Trávez Trávez, OFM	Quito	Ecuadorian Episcopal Conference	Ecuador
Archbishop José Luis Escobar Alas	San Salvador	Episcopal Conference of El Salvador	El Salvador
Bishop Rodolfo Valenzuela Núñez	Verapaz	Episcopal Conference of Guatemala	Guatemala
Cardinal Chibly Langlois	Les Cayes	Episcopal Conference of Haiti	Haiti
Cardinal Óscar Rodríguez Maradiaga, SDB	Tegucigalpa	Episcopal Conference of Honduras	Honduras
Cardinal Francisco Robles Ortega	Guadalajara	Mexican Episcopal Conference	Mexico
Bishop Sócrates René Sándigo Jirón	Juigalpa	Episcopal Conference of Nicaragua	Nicaragua
Archbishop José Domingo Ulloa Mendieta, OSA	Panamá	Episcopal Conference of Panama	Panama
Bishop Catalino Claudio Giménez Medina, ISch	Caacupé	Paraguayan Episcopal Conference	Paraguay
Archbishop Salvador Piñeiro García-Calderón	Ayacucho	Peruvian Episcopal Conference	Peru
Archbishop Roberto González Nieves, OFM	San Juan de Puerto Rico	Puerto Rican Episcopal Conference	Puerto Rico
Archbishop Joseph Edward Kurtz	Louisville	United States Conference of Catholic Bishops	United States
Bishop Rodolfo Wirz	Maldonado-Punta del Este	Episcopal Conference of Uruguay	Uruguay
Archbishop Diego Padrón	Cumaná	Venezuelan Episcopal Conference	Venezuela

=== Asia ===
Name	See	Episcopal conference	Country
Archbishop Patrick D'Rozario, CSC	Dhaka	Catholic Bishops' Conference of Bangladesh	Bangladesh
Bishop Basílio do Nascimento	Baucau	Episcopal Conference of Timor	East Timor
Cardinal Oswald Gracias	Bombay	Conference of Catholic Bishops of India	India
Archbishop Ignatius Suharyo Hardjoatmodjo	Jakarta	Bishops' Conference of Indonesia	Indonesia
Archeparch Thomas Meram	Urmyā	Iranian Episcopal Conference	Iran
Patriarch Fouad Twal	Jerusalem	Assembly of Catholic Ordinaries of the Holy Land	Israel
Archbishop Peter Takeo Okada	Tokyo	Catholic Bishops' Conference of Japan	Japan
Archbishop Tomasz Peta	Astana	Episcopal Conference of Kazakhstan	Kazakhstan
Bishop Louis-Marie Ling Mangkhanekhoun	Paksé	Episcopal Conference of Laos and Cambodia	Laos
Archbishop John Ha Tiong Hock	Kuching	Catholic Bishops' Conference of Malaysia, Singapore and Brunei	Malaysia
Bishop Felix Lian Khen Thang	Kalay	Catholic Bishops' Conference of Myanmar	Myanmar
Archbishop Joseph Coutts	Karachi	Catholic Bishops' Conference of Pakistan	Pakistan
Archbishop Socrates Villegas	Lingayen-Dagupan	Catholic Bishops' Conference of the Philippines	Philippines
Bishop Peter Kang U-il	Cheju	Catholic Bishops' Conference of Korea	South Korea
Cardinal Malcolm Ranjith	Colombo	Catholic Bishops' Conference of Sri Lanka	Sri Lanka
Archbishop John Hung Shan-Chuan, SVD	Tapei	Chinese Regional Bishops' Conference	Taiwan
Archbishop Louis Chamniern Santisukniram	Thare and Nonseng	Catholic Bishops' Conference of Thailand	Thailand
Archbishop Ruggero Franceschini, OFMCap	İzmir	Episcopal Conference of Turkey	Turkey
Archbishop Paul Bùi Văn Đọc	Ho Chi Minh City	Catholic Bishops' Conference of Vietnam	Vietnam

=== Europe ===
Name	See	Episcopal conference	Country
Archbishop Angelo Massafra, OFM	Shkodër-Pult	Episcopal Conference of Albania	Albania
Cardinal Christoph Schönborn, OP	Vienna	Austrian Bishops' Conference	Austria
Archbishop Tadeusz Kondrusiewicz	Minsk-Mohilev	Conference of Catholic Bishops of Belarus	Belarus
Archbishop André-Joseph Léonard	Mechelen-Brussels	Episcopal Conference of Belgium	Belgium
Bishop Franjo Komarica	Banja Luka	Bishops' Conference of Bosnia and Herzegovina	Bosnia and Herzegovina
Exarch Christo Proykov	Sofia	Episcopal Conference of Bulgaria	Bulgaria
Cardinal Josip Bozanić	Zagreb	Croatian Bishops' Conference	Croatia
Archbishop Jan Graubner	Olomouc	Czech Bishops' Conference	Czech Republic
Archbishop Georges Pontier	Marseille	Bishops' Conference of France	France
Cardinal Reinhard Marx	Munich and Freising	German Bishops' Conference	Germany
Bishop Frangiskos Papamanolis, OFMCap	Syros and Milos (emeritus)	Holy Synod of Catholic Bishops of Greece	Greece
Cardinal Péter Erdő	Esztergom-Budapest	Catholic Bishops' Conference of Hungary	Hungary
Archbishop Diarmuid Martin	Dublin	Irish Catholic Bishops' Conference	Ireland
Cardinal Angelo Bagnasco	Genoa	Italian Episcopal Conference	Italy
Archbishop Zbigņevs Stankevičs	Riga	Latvian Bishops' Conference	Latvia
Bishop Rimantas Norvila	Vilkaviškis	Lithuanian Bishops' Conference	Lithuania
Bishop Mario Grech	Gozo	Maltese Episcopal Conference	Malta
Cardinal Wim Eijk	Utrecht	Bishops' Conference of the Netherlands	Netherlands
Archbishop Stanisław Gądecki	Poznań	Polish Episcopal Conference	Poland
Patriarch Manuel III	Lisbon	Portuguese Episcopal Conference	Portugal
Archbishop Ioan Robu	Bucharest	Romanian Episcopal Conference	Romania
Archbishop Paolo Pezzi, FSCB	Moscow	Conference of Catholic Bishops of the Russian Federation	Russia
Archbishop Philip Tartaglia	Glasgow	Bishops' Conference of Scotland	Scotland
Archbishop Zef Gashi, SDB	Bar	International Bishops' Conference of Saints Cyril and Methodius	Serbia
Archbishop Stanislav Zvolenský	Bratislava	Conference of Slovak Bishops	Slovakia
Bishop Andrej Glavan	Novo Mesto	Slovenian Bishops' Conference	Slovenia
Archbishop Ricardo Blázquez	Valladolid	Spanish Episcopal Conference	Spain
Bishop Anders Arborelius, OCD	Stockholm	Scandinavian Bishops Conference	Sweden
Bishop Markus Büchel	Saint Gallen	Swiss Bishops Conference	Switzerland
Archbishop Mieczysław Mokrzycki	Lviv	Ukrainian Episcopal Conference	Ukraine
Archbishop Vincent Nichols	Westminster	Catholic Bishops' Conference of England and Wales	United Kingdom

=== Oceania ===
Name	See	Episcopal conference	Country
Archbishop Denis Hart	Melbourne	Australian Catholic Bishops' Conference	Australia
Archbishop John Dew	Wellington	New Zealand Catholic Bishops' Conference	New Zealand
Bishop Arnold Orowae	Wabag	Catholic Bishops' Conference of Papua New Guinea and Solomon Islands	Papua New Guinea
Cardinal Soane Patita Paini Mafi	Tonga	Episcopal Conference of the Pacific	Tonga

== Superiors General ==
Three delegates from the leadership of the Union of Superiors General were added to represent those in religious life.

Name	Office	Country
Rev. Adolfo Nicolás, SJ	Superior General of the Society of Jesus	Spain
Rev. Mauro Jöhri, OFMCap	Minister General of the Order of Friars Minor Capuchin	Switzerland
Rev. Mario Aldegani, CSI	Superior General of the Congregation of Saint Joseph (Josephites of Murialdo)	Italy

== Heads of the Dicasteries of the Roman Curia ==
The 25 heads of the Dicasteries of the Roman Curia served as delegates as provided for in the Synod statutes.

Name	Office	Country
Cardinal Pietro Parolin	Cardinal Secretary of State	Italy
Cardinal Marc Ouellet, PSS	Prefect of the Congregation for Bishops	Canada
Cardinal Zenon Grocholewski	Prefect of the Congregation for Catholic Education	Poland
Cardinal Angelo Amato, SDB	Prefect of the Congregation for the Causes of Saints	Italy
Cardinal Beniamino Stella	Prefect of the Congregation for the Clergy	Italy
Cardinal Gerhard Ludwig Müller	Prefect of the Congregation for the Doctrine of the Faith	Germany
Cardinal Fernando Filoni	Prefect of the Congregation for the Evangelization of Peoples	Italy
Cardinal João Braz de Aviz	Prefect of the Congregation for Institutes of Consecrated Life and Societies of Apostolic Life	Brazil
Cardinal Leonardo Sandri	Prefect of the Congregation for the Oriental Churches	Italy
Cardinal Mauro Piacenza	Major Penitentiary of the Apostolic Penitentiary	Italy
Cardinal Raymond Leo Burke	Prefect of the Supreme Tribunal of the Apostolic Signatura	United States
Cardinal Gianfranco Ravasi	President of the Pontifical Council for Culture	Italy
Cardinal Robert Sarah	President of the Pontifical Council Cor Unum	Guinea
Archbishop Vincenzo Paglia	President of the Pontifical Council for the Family	Italy
Cardinal Jean-Louis Tauran	President of the Pontifical Council for Interreligious Dialogue	France
Cardinal Peter Turkson	President of the Pontifical Council for Justice and Peace	Ghana
Cardinal Stanisław Ryłko	President of the Pontifical Council for the Laity	Poland
Cardinal Francesco Coccopalmerio	President of the Pontifical Council for Legislative Texts	Italy
Cardinal Antonio Maria Vegliò	President of the Pontifical Council for the Pastoral Care of Migrants and Itinerants	Italy
Archbishop Zygmunt Zimowski	President of the Pontifical Council for the Pastoral Care of Health Care Workers	Poland
Cardinal Kurt Koch	President of the Pontifical Council for Promoting Christian Unity	Switzerland
Archbishop Rino Fisichella	President of the Pontifical Council for Promoting the New Evangelization	Italy
Archbishop Claudio Maria Celli	President of the Pontifical Council for Social Communications	Italy
Cardinal Domenico Calcagno	President of the Administration of the Patrimony of the Apostolic See	Italy
Cardinal Giuseppe Versaldi	President of the Prefecture for the Economic Affairs of the Holy See	Italy

== Members of the Ordinary Council ==
The 15 members of the Ordinary Council of the Synod also attended:

Name	Office	Country
Cardinal Timothy Dolan	Archbishop of New York	United States
Cardinal Péter Erdő	Archbishop of Esztergom-Budapest	Hungary
Archbishop Rino Fisichella	President of the Pontifical Council for Promoting the New Evangelization	Italy
Archbishop Bruno Forte	Archbishop of Chieti-Vasto	Italy
Cardinal Oswald Gracias	Archbishop of Bombay	India
Cardinal Laurent Monsengwo Pasinya	Archbishop of Kinshasa	DR Congo
Cardinal Wilfrid Napier, OFM	Archbishop of Durban	South Africa
Cardinal George Pell	Prefect of the Secretariat for the Economy	Australia
Bishop Santiago Silva Retamales	Auxiliary Bishop of Valparaíso	Chile
Cardinal Odilo Scherer	Archbishop of São Paulo	Brazil
Cardinal Christoph Schönborn	Archbishop of Vienna	Austria
Major Archbishop Sviatoslav Shevchuk	Major Archbishop of Kiev–Galicia	Ukraine
Cardinal Luis Antonio Tagle	Archbishop of Manila	Philippines
Cardinal Peter Turkson	President of the Pontifical Council for Justice and Peace	Ghana
Cardinal Donald Wuerl	Archbishop of Washington	United States

== Papal appointees ==
There were 26 additional members appointed by Pope Francis.

Name	Office	Country
Cardinal Fernando Sebastián Aguilar, CMF	Archbishop emeritus of Pamplona y Tudela	Spain
Cardinal Giuseppe Bertello	President of the Pontifical Commission for Vatican City State	Italy
Cardinal Carlo Caffarra	Archbishop of Bologna	Italy
Rev. Manuel Arroba Conde, CMF	Professor of Canon Law, Pontifical Lateran University	Spain
Archbishop Anil Joseph Thomas Couto	Archbishop of Delhi	India
Cardinal Godfried Danneels	Archbishop emeritus of Mechelen-Brussels	Belgium
Rev. François-Xavier Dumortier, SJ	Rector of the Pontifical Gregorian University	France
Archbishop Victor Manuel Fernández	Rector of the Pontifical Catholic University of Argentina	Argentina
Cardinal John Tong Hon	Bishop of Hong Kong	Hong Kong
Cardinal Walter Kasper	President emeritus of the Pontifical Council for Promoting Christian Unity	Germany
Bishop Edgard Madi	Bishop of Our Lady of Lebanon of São Paulo	Brazil
Archbishop Edoardo Menichelli	Archbishop of Ancona-Osimo	Italy
Cardinal Philippe Ouédraogo	Archbishop of Ouagadougou	Burkina Faso
Bishop Pio Vito Pinto	Dean of the Tribunal of the Roman Rota	Italy
Archbishop Carlos Aguiar Retes	Archbishop of Tlalnepantla	Mexico
Cardinal Elio Sgreccia	President emeritus of the Pontifical Academy for Life	Italy
Cardinal Lluís Martínez Sistach	Archbishop of Barcelona	Spain
Cardinal Angelo Scola	Archbishop of Milan	Italy
Cardinal Angelo Sodano	Dean of the College of Cardinals	Italy
Bishop Enrico Solmi	Bishop of Parma	Italy
Cardinal Andrew Yeom Soo-jung	Archbishop of Seoul	South Korea
Rev. Antonio Spadaro, SJ	Editor-in-chief of La Civiltà Cattolica	Italy
Cardinal Orani João Tempesta, OCist	São Sebastião do Rio de Janeiro	Brazil
Archbishop Giovanni Tonucci	Territorial Prelate of Loreto	Italy
Bishop Alonso Gerardo Garza Treviño	Bishop of Piedras Negras	Mexico
Cardinal André Vingt-Trois	Archbishop of Paris	France

== Other participants ==
=== Collaborators of the Special Secretary ===
The following were appointed to be collaborators of the Special Secretary:

Name	Office	Country
Tony Anatrella	Consultant to the Pontifical Council for the Family Consultant to the Pontifical Council for the Pastoral Care of Health Care Workers	France
Rev. Gérard Berliet	Professor of Sacred Scripture, Provincial Seminary of Lyon Head of Pastoral Care of Divorced and Remarried Faithful for the Diocese of Dijon	France
Rev. Bruno Esposito, OP	Professor of Canon Law, Pontifical University of Saint Thomas Aquinas	Italy
Rev. Alfonso Fernández Benito	Professor of Moral Theology and the Sacrament of Marriage, San Ildefonso Higher Institute for Theological Studies Director of the Institute for Religious Sciences of Santa Maria of Toledo	Spain
Rev. Arul Gali, CSC	National Director of Holy Cross Family Ministries	India
Jeffrey Goh	Professor Systematic Theology, St. Peter's College, Kuching Judge of the Ecclesiastical Tribunal of Kuching	Malaysia
Rev. Maurizio Gronchi	Professor of Dogmatic Theology, Pontifical Urban University Consultant of the Congregation for the Doctrine of the Faith	Italy
Rodrigo Guerra López	Director-General of the Centro de Investigación Social Avanzada	Mexico
Jocelyne Khoueiry	Member of the Episcopal Commission for the Family and Life of the Assembly of Catholic Patriarchs and Bishops of Lebanon	Lebanon
Helen Kyung Soo Kwon	Member of the Executive Committee of the Helen Kim Scholarship Foundation, Ewha Womans University	South Korea
Rev. Sabatino Majorano, CSSR	Professor of Systematic Moral Theology, Alphonsian Academy	Italy
Christopher Laurence Meney	Director of the Centre for Life, Marriage, and the Family of the Archdiocese of Sydney	Australia
Francesco Miano	Professor of Moral Philosophy, University of Rome Tor Vergata President Emeritus of Catholic Action in Italy	Italy
Giuseppina De Simone	Professor of Philosophy, San Luigi Papal Theological Seminary of Southern Italy	Italy
Carmen Peña García	Professor of Canon Law, Comillas Pontifical University Defendor of the Bond and Promoter of Justice at the Metropolitan Tribunal of Madrid	Spain
Rev. Georges-Henri Ruyssen, SJ	Professor of Canon Law, Pontifical Oriental Institute	Belgium

=== Auditors ===
The auditors included 14 married couples named by Pope Francis.

Name	Office	Country
Arturo As Zamberline Hermelinda As Zamberline	Heads of Équipe Notre-Dame	Brazil
Riyadh Albeer Naoom Azzo Sanaa Namir Ibrahim Habeeb	Witnesses of Christian family life in an Islamic context	Iraq
León Botolo Kisanga Sosawe Marie Valentine Kisanga Sosawe	Founders of the Communauté Famile Chétienne	DR Congo
Zelmira María Bottini De Rey	Director of the Institute for Couples and Families, Pontifical Catholic University of Argentina President of the Latin American Network of Institutes for the Family in Catholic Universities	Argentina
George Campos Cynthia Campos	Director of Couples for Christ Member of Couples for Christ	Philippines
Inácio Amândio Chaúque	Formator of young couples	Mozambique
Joan Clements	Director of the Managing Board of the World Organisation Ovulation Method Billings	Australia
Stephen Conway Sandra Conway	Regional heads of Africa de Retrouvailles	South Africa
Ute Eberl	Head of Pastoral Care for the Family and Marriage in Berlin	Germany
Pilar Escudero de Jensen	Member of the Vicariate General of Pastoral Care for the Archdiocese of Santiago Member of the Pontifical Council for the Laity Member of the Schoenstatt Institute for Families	Chile
Luis Jensen Acuña	Member of the Bioethical Centre of the Pontifical Catholic University of Chile President of the Fundación Médico Cultural Porta Vitae Member of the Schoenstatt Institute for Families	Chile
Jean Dieudonné Gatsinga Emerthe Gatsinga Tumuhayimpundu	Heads of young families in the Focolari Movement	Rwanda
Jeffrey Heinzen Alice Heinzen	Director of Natural Family Planning in the Diocese of La Crosse Member of the Natural Family Planning Advisory Board of the US Conference of Catholic Bishops	United States
Iva Myriam Hoyos Castañeda	Delegate Procurator for the Defense of Rights of Childhood, Adolescence, and the Family	Colombia
Sélim Khoury Rita Khoury	Heads of the Office of Family Pastoral Care in the Maronite Catholic Patriarchate of Antioch	Lebanon
Rev. Cajetan Menezes	Director of the Apostolate for the Family of the Archdiocese of Bombay	India
Sr. Margaret Muldoon	Superior General emeritus of the Sisters of the Holy Family of Burdeos	Ireland
María Lacalle Noriega	Director of the Francisco de Vitoria Centre for Family Studies and Social and Economic Studies Secretary-General of the Spanish Society for Bioethics and Biojustice	Spain
Francisco Padilla	Head of Couples for Christ Foundation for Family and Life	Philippines
Giuseppe Petracca Ciavarella Lucia Miglionico	Members of the National Advisory Council for Family Pastoral Care	Italy
Algirdas Petronis	Vice President of the International Federation for Catholic Families Director of the Family Center of the Archdiocese of Vilnius	Lithuania
Romano Pirola Mavis Pirola	Directors of the Australian Catholic Marriage and Family Council	Australia
Olivier Roussy Xristilla Roussy	Heads of the apostolic branch of Amour et Vérité	France
Steve Schultz Claudia Schultz	Members of the International Catholic Engaged Encounter	United States
Michèle Taupin	President of the Movement Espérance et Vie	France
Jeannette Touré	National President of the Association of Catholic Women in the Côte d'Ivoire	Ivory Coast

== Fraternal delegates ==
Name	Profession	Religion	Country
Athenagoras	Metropolitan of Belgium	Eastern Orthodox (Ecumenical Patriarchate of Constantinople)	Belgium
Hilarion	Metropolitan of Volokolamsk	Eastern Orthodox (Russian Orthodox Church)	Russia
Bishoy	Metropolitan of Damietta, Kafr Elsheikh and Elbarari	Coptic Orthodox Church of Alexandria	Egypt
Mar Yostinos	Archbishop of Zhale and Bekau	(Syriac Orthodox) (Patriarchate of Antioch)	Lebanon
Paul Butler	Bishop of Durham	Anglican Communion (Church of England)	United Kingdom
Ndanganeni Petrus Phaswaha	President of the Lutheran Evangelical Church	Lutheranism (Lutheran Evangelical Church)	South Africa
Benebo Fubara-Manuel	President of the Nigeria Communion of Reformed Churches	Calvinism (Nigeria Reformed Church)	Nigeria
Valérie Duval-Poujol	Professor of Biblical Exegesis, Institut Catholique de Paris	Baptist World Alliance	France
