= List of participants at the Second Extraordinary General Assembly of the Synod of Bishops =

In addition to Pope John Paul II, who served as president of the Second Extraordinary General Assembly of the Synod of Bishops in 1985, there were multiple other classes of participants. Archbishop Jan Pieter Schotte, CICM, served as Secretary General, Cardinal Godfried Danneels was the Relator General, and the Rev. Walter Kasper was the Special Secretary. The delegate presidents were cardinals John Krol, Joseph Malula, and Johannes Willebrands. Overall, there were 165 cardinals, archbishops, and bishops and ten observer-delegates. No women were invited to participate.

== Eastern Catholic Churches ==
The Eastern Catholic Churches were represented by:

	See	Church	Country
Patriarch Nerses Bedros XIX Tarmouni	Cilicia	Armenian Catholic Church	Lebanon
Archbishop Metodi Dimitrov Stratiev	Sofia	Bulgarian Greek Catholic Church	Bulgaria
Archeparch Youhannan Semaan Issayi	Tehran	Chaldean Catholic Church	Iran
Eparch Andraos Ghattas	Luxor	Coptic Catholic Church	Egypt
Cardinal Paulos Tzadua	Addis Ababa	Ethiopian Catholic Church	Ethiopia
?		Melkite Greek Catholic Church	Israel
?		Romanian Greek Catholic Church	Romania
?		Ruthenian Greek Catholic Church	United States
?		Slovak Greek Catholic Church	Czechoslovakia
Patriarch Antoine Pierre Khoraiche	Antiochia	Syriac Maronite Church	Lebanon
Patriarch Ignace Antoine II Hayek	Antiochia	Syriac Catholic Church	Israel
Major Archbishop Antony Padiyara	Ernakulam-Angamaly	Syro-Malabar Catholic Church	India
Major Archbishop Benedict Varghese Gregorios Thangalathil	Trivandrum	Syro-Malankara Catholic Church	India
Cardinal Myroslav Ivan Lubachivsky	Lviv	Ukrainian Greek Catholic Church	Soviet Union

== Representatives of episcopal conferences ==
The following bishops were presidents or representatives of episcopal conferences. Unlike in ordinary general assemblies of the Synod of Bishops, where episcopal conferences can elect a bishop to represent them, in extraordinary general assemblies, the representative is almost always the episcopal conference's president.

=== Africa ===
Name	See	Episcopal conference	Country
Bishop Henri Teissier	Algiers	Regional Episcopal Conference of North Africa	Algeria
Archbishop Manuel Franklin da Costa	Lubango	Episcopal Conference of Angola and São Tomé	Angola
Archbishop Christophe Adimou	Cotonou	Episcopal Conference of Benin	Benin
Archbishop Anselme Titianma Sanon	Bobo-Dioulasso	Conference of Bishops of Burkina Faso and of Niger	Burkina Faso
Archbishop Joachim Ruhuna	Gitega	Conference of Catholic Bishops of Burundi	Burundi
Cardinal Christian Tumi	Garoua	National Episcopal Conference of Cameroon	Cameroon
Archbishop Joachim N'Dayen	Bangui	Central African Episcopal Conference	Central African Republic
Archbishop Charles Louis Joseph Vandame	N'Djaména	Episcopal Conference of Chad	Chad
Bishop Georges-Firmin Singha	Owando	Episcopal Conference of the Congo	Congo
Archbishop Rafael María Nze Abuy	Malabo	Episcopal Conference of Equatorial Guinea	Equatorial Guinea
Cardinal Paulos Tzadua	Addis Ababa	Assembly of Catholic Hierarchs of Ethiopia	Ethiopia
Bishop Félicien-Patrice Makouaka	Franceville	Episcopal Conference of Gabon	Gabon
Archbishop Peter Poreku Dery	Tamale	Ghana Catholic Bishops' Conference	Ghana
Archbishop Robert Sarah	Conakry	Episcopal Conference of Guinea	Guinea
Cardinal Bernard Yago	Abidjan	Episcopal Conference of the Côte d'Ivoire	Ivory Coast
Bishop Raphael S. Ndingi Mwana a'Nzeki	Nakuru	Kenyan Episcopal Conference	Kenya
Bishop Sebastian Koto Khoarai	Mohale's Hoek	Lesotho Catholic Bishops' Conference	Lesotho
Archbishop Michael Kpakala Francis	Monrovia	Inter-territorial Catholic Bishops' Conference of the Gambia, Liberia, and Sierra Leone	Liberia
Cardinal Victor Razafimahatratra	Antananarivo	Episcopal Conference of Madagascar	Madagascar
Archbishop James Chiona	Blantyre	Episcopal Conference of Malawi	Malawi
Archbishop Luc Sangaré Auguste	Bamako	Episcopal Conference of Mali	Mali
Archbishop Jaime Pedro Gonçalves	Beira	Episcopal Conference of Mozambique	Mozambique
Bishop Gabriel Gonsum Ganaka	Jos	Catholic Bishops' Conference of Nigeria	Nigeria
Bishop Joseph Ruzindana	Byumba	Conference of Catholic Bishops of Rwanda	Rwanda
Cardinal Hyacinthe Thiandoum	Dakar	Conference of Bishops of Senegal, Mauritania, Cape Verde, and Guinea Bissau	Senegal
Archbishop Denis Hurley	Durban	Southern African Catholic Bishops' Conference	South Africa
Archbishop Gabriel Zubeir Wako	Khartoum	Sudan Catholic Bishops' Conference	Sudan
Bishop Anthony Mayala	Musoma	Tanzania Episcopal Conference	Tanzania
Archbishop Robert-Casimir Dosseh-Anyron	Lomé	Episcopal Conference of Togo	Togo
Bishop Barnabas Halem 'Imana	Kabale	Uganda Episcopal Conference	Uganda
Archbishop Laurent Monsengwo Pasinya	Kisangani	Episcopal Conference of Zaire	Zaire
Bishop James Mwewa Spaita	Mansa	Zambia Episcopal Conference	Zambia
Bishop Wunganayi Chiginya Tobias	Gweru	Zimbabwe Catholic Bishops' Conference	Zimbabwe

=== The Americas ===
Name	See	Episcopal conference	Country
Cardinal Juan Carlos Aramburu	Buenos Aires	Argentine Episcopal Conference	Argentina
Bishop Julio Terrazas Sandoval	Oruro	Bolivian Episcopal Conference	Bolivia
Bishop Ivo Lorscheiter	Santa Maria	National Conference of Bishops of Brazil	Brazil
Bishop Bernard Hubert	Saint-Jean-Longueuil	Canadian Conference of Catholic Bishops	Canada
Archbishop Bernardino Piñera	La Serena	Episcopal Conference of Chile	Chile
Archbishop Héctor Rueda Hernández	Bucaramanga	Episcopal Conference of Colombia	Colombia
Bishop Darío Castrillón Hoyos	Pereira	Latin American Episcopal Conference	Colombia
Archbishop Román Arrieta Villalobos	San José de Costa Rica	Episcopal Conference of Costa Rica	Costa Rica
Bishop Adolfo Rodríguez Herrera	Camagüey	Conference of Catholic Bishops of Cuba	Cuba
Archbishop Nicolás de Jesús López Rodríguez	Santo Domingo	Conference of the Dominican Episcopate	Dominican Republic
Archbishop Bernardino Echeverría Ruiz	Guayaquil	Ecuadorian Episcopal Conference	Ecuador
Bishop Marco René Revelo Contreros	Santa Ana	Episcopal Conference of El Salvador	El Salvador
Archbishop Próspero Penados del Barrio	Guatemala	Episcopal Conference of Guatemala	Guatemala
Bishop François Gayot, SMM	Cap-Haïtien	Episcopal Conference of Haiti	Haiti
Archbishop Héctor Enrique Santos Hernández	Tegucigalpa	Episcopal Conference of Honduras	Honduras
Archbishop Samuel Emmanuel Carter	Kingston in Jamaica	Antilles Episcopal Conference	Jamaica
Archbishop Sergio Obeso Rivera	Xalapa	Mexican Episcopal Conference	Mexico
Cardinal Miguel Obando y Bravo	Managua	Episcopal Conference of Nicaragua	Nicaragua
Archbishop Marcos Gregorio McGrath	Panamá	Episcopal Conference of Panama	Panama
Archbishop Ismael Blas Rolón Silvero	Asunción	Paraguayan Episcopal Conference	Paraguay
Cardinal Juan Landázuri Ricketts	Lima	Peruvian Episcopal Conference	Peru
Bishop Juan Fremiot Torres Oliver	Ponce	Puerto Rican Episcopal Conference	Puerto Rico
Bishop James William Malone	Youngstown	United States Conference of Catholic Bishops	United States
Archbishop José Gottardi Cristelli	Montevideo	Episcopal Conference of Uruguay	Uruguay
Cardinal José Lebrún Moratinos	Caracas	Venezuelan Episcopal Conference	Venezuela

=== Asia ===
Name	See	Episcopal conference	Country
Archbishop Michael Rozario	Dhaka	Catholic Bishops' Conference of Bangladesh	Bangladesh
Bishop Paul Zinghtung Grawng	Mandalay	Catholic Bishops' Conference of Burma	Burma
Archbishop Simon Pimenta	Bombay	Conference of Catholic Bishops of India	India
Bishop Francis Xavier Sudartanta Hadisumarta	Manokwari–Sorong	Bishops' Conference of Indonesia	Indonesia
Archeparch Youhannan Semaan Issayi	Tehran	Iranian Episcopal Conference	Iran
?		Assembly of Catholic Ordinaries of the Holy Land	Israel
Archbishop Peter Shirayanagi	Tokyo	Catholic Bishops' Conference of Japan	Japan
?		Episcopal Conference of Laos and Cambodia	LaosCambodia
Cardinal Joseph Cordeiro	Karachi	Catholic Bishops' Conference of Pakistan	Pakistan
Cardinal Ricardo Vidal	Cebu	Catholic Bishops' Conference of the Philippines	Philippines
Archbishop Gregory Yong	Singapore	Catholic Bishops' Conference of Malaysia, Singapore and Brunei	Singapore
Cardinal Stephen Kim Sou-hwan	Seoul	Catholic Bishops' Conference of Korea	South Korea
Bishop Frank Marcus Fernando	Chilaw	Catholic Bishops' Conference of Sri Lanka	Sri Lanka
Archbishop Stanislaus Lo Kuang	Tapei	Chinese Regional Bishops' Conference	Taiwan
Archbishop Louis Chamniern Santisukniram	Thare and Nonseng	Catholic Bishops' Conference of Thailand	Thailand
Bishop Gauthier Pierre Georges Antoine Dubois	Constantinople	Episcopal Conference of Turkey	Turkey
Cardinal Joseph-Marie Trịnh Như Khuê	Hanoi	Catholic Bishops' Conference of Vietnam	Vietnam

=== Europe ===
Name	See	Episcopal conference	Country
Archbishop Karl Berg	Salzburg	Austrian Bishops' Conference	Austria
Cardinal Godfried Danneels	Mechelen-Brussels	Episcopal Conference of Belgium	Belgium
Archbishop Metodi Dimitrov Stratiev	Sofia	Episcopal Conference of Bulgaria	Bulgaria
Archbishop Jean-Félix-Albert-Marie Vilnet	Lille	Bishops' Conference of France	France
Cardinal Joachim Meisner	Berlin	Berlin Conference of Bishops	West Germany
Cardinal Joseph Höffner	Cologne	German Bishops' Conference	West Germany
Archbishop Antonios Varthalitis	Corfu, Zakynthos, and Cephalonia	Holy Synod of Catholic Bishops of Greece	Greece
Cardinal László Lékai	Esztergom	Catholic Bishops' Conference of Hungary	Hungary
Cardinal Tomás Ó Fiaich	Armagh	Irish Catholic Bishops' Conference	Ireland
Cardinal Ugo Poletti	Cardinal Vicar of Rome	Italian Episcopal Conference	Italy
Archbishop Joseph Mercieca	Malta	Maltese Episcopal Conference	Malta
Cardinal Adrianus Johannes Simonis	Utrecht	Bishops' Conference of the Netherlands	Netherlands
Bishop John Willem Gran	Oslo	Scandinavian Bishops Conference	Norway
Cardinal Józef Glemp	Warsaw	Polish Episcopal Conference	Poland
Bishop Manuel d'Almeida Trindade	Aveiro	Portuguese Episcopal Conference	Portugal
?		Romanian Episcopal Conference	Romania
Cardinal Thomas Winning	Glasgow	Bishops' Conference of Scotland	Scotland
Archbishop Gabino Díaz Merchán	Oviedo	Spanish Episcopal Conference	Spain
Bishop Henri Schwery	Sion	Swiss Bishops Conference	Switzerland
Cardinal Myroslav Ivan Lubachivsky	Lviv	Ukrainian Episcopal Conference	Soviet Union
Cardinal Basil Hume	Westminster	Catholic Bishops' Conference of England and Wales	United Kingdom

=== Oceania ===
Name	See	Episcopal conference	Country
Archbishop Francis Roberts Rush	Brisbane	Australian Catholic Bishops' Conference	Australia
Cardinal Thomas Williams	Wellington	New Zealand Catholic Bishops' Conference	New Zealand
Bishop Gregory Singkai	Bougainville	Catholic Bishops' Conference of Papua New Guinea and Solomon Islands	Papua New Guinea
Archbishop Petero Mataca	Suva	Episcopal Conference of the Pacific	Fiji

== Heads of the Dicasteries of the Roman Curia ==
The following heads of the Dicasteries of the Roman Curia attended:

Name	Office	Country
Cardinal Agostino Casaroli	Cardinal Secretary of State	Italy
Cardinal Bernardin Gantin	Prefect of the Sacred Congregation for Bishops	Benin
Cardinal William Wakefield Baum	Prefect of the Sacred Congregation for Catholic Institutions	United States
Cardinal Pietro Palazzini	Prefect of the Sacred Congregation for the Causes of Saints	Italy
Cardinal Silvio Oddi	Prefect of the Sacred Congregation for the Clergy	Italy
Cardinal Paul Augustin Mayer	Prefect of the Sacred Congregation for Divine Worship	West Germany
Cardinal Joseph Ratzinger	Prefect of the Sacred Congregation for the Doctrine of the Faith	West Germany
Cardinal Jozef Tomko	Prefect of the Sacred Congregation for the Evangelization of Peoples	Czechoslovakia
Cardinal Jean Jérôme Hamer	Prefect of the Sacred Congregation for Religious and Secular Institutes	Belgium
Cardinal Duraisamy Simon Lourdusamy	Prefect of the Congregation for the Oriental Churches	India
Cardinal Paul Augustin Mayer	Prefect of the Sacred Congregation for the Sacraments	West Germany
Cardinal Luigi Dadaglio	Major Penitentiary of the Apostolic Penitentiary	Italy
Cardinal Aurelio Sabattani	Prefect of the Supreme Tribunal of the Apostolic Signatura	Italy
Cardinal Gabriel-Marie Garrone	President of the Pontifical Council for Culture	France
Cardinal Roger Etchegaray	President of the Pontifical Council Cor Unum	France
Archbishop Édouard Gagnon	President of the Pontifical Council for the Family	Canada
Cardinal Roger Etchegaray	President of the Pontifical Council for Justice and Peace	France
Cardinal Eduardo Francisco Pironio	President of the Pontifical Council for the Laity	Argentina
Cardinal Rosalio José Castillo Lara	President of the Pontifical Council for the Interpretation of the Decrees of the Second Vatican Council	Venezuela
Archbishop Fiorenzo Angelini	President of the Pontifical Council for the Pastoral Assistance of Health Care Workers	Italy
Archbishop John Patrick Foley	President of the Pontifical Council for Social Communications	United States
Cardinal Paul Poupard	President of the Secretariat for Non-Believers	France
Cardinal Francis Arinze	President of the Secretariat for Non-Christians	Nigeria
Cardinal Johannes Willebrands	President of the Secretariat for Promoting Christian Unity	Netherlands
Cardinal Agnelo Rossi	President of the Administration of the Patrimony of the Apostolic See	Brazil
Cardinal Giuseppe Caprio	President of the Prefecture for the Economic Affairs of the Holy See	Italy

== Papal invitees ==
There were additional members invited by Pope John Paul II:

Name	Office	Country
Rev. Hans Urs von Balthasar	Theologian	Switzerland
Cardinal Joseph Bernardin	Archbishop of Chicago	United States
Cardinal John Francis Dearden	Archbishop emeritus of Detroit	United States
Archbishop Maxim Hermaniuk	Archbishop of Winnipeg	Canada
Cardinal Franz König	Archbishop emeritus of Vienna	Austria
Cardinal John Krol	Archbishop of Philadelphia	United States
Cardinal Bernard Francis Law	Archbishop of Boston	United States
Cardinal Aloísio Lorscheider	Archbishop of Fortaleza	Brazil
Cardinal Henri de Lubac, SJ	Theologian	France
Cardinal Jean-Marie Lustiger	Archbishop of Paris	France
Cardinal Friedrich Wetter	Archbishop of Munich and Freising	West Germany
Cardinal Eugênio Sales	Archbishop of Rio de Janeiro	Brazil
Cardinal Ángel Suquía Goicoechea	Archbishop of Madrid	Spain

== Fraternal delegates ==
The following delegates represented non-Catholic organizations:

Name	Profession	Religion	Country
Rev. Andreas Aarflot	Bishop of Oslo Representative of the Lutheran World Federation	Lutheranism (Church of Norway)	Norway
Bishop William Ragsdale Cannon	Bishop emeritus of the Raleigh Area Representative of the World Methodist Council	Methodism (United Methodist Church)	United States
Rev. Henry Chadwick	Professor emeritus of Divinity, University of Cambridge	Anglican Communion (Church of England)	United Kingdom
Archbishop Stylianos Harkianakis	Archbishop of Australia	Eastern Orthodox (Ecumenical Patriarchate of Constantinople)	Australia
Bishop Anba Paula	General Bishop	Oriental Orthodox (Coptic Orthodox Church of Alexandria)	Egypt
Rev. Lewis Mudge	Dean of McCormick Theological Seminary Representative of the World Reformed Alliance	Calvinism (Presbyterian Church (USA))	United States
Rev. David M. Thompson	Professor, University of Cambridge	Calvinism (Disciples of Christ)	United Kingdom
Rev. David S. Russell	General Secretary emeritus of the Baptists Union of Great Britain Representative of the Baptist World Alliance	Baptist	United Kingdom
Rev. Justus T. du Plessis	Pentecostal pastor	Pentecostalism	South Africa
Rev. Jacques Maury (fr)	President of the Protestant Federation of France World Council of Churches	Calvinism (Reformed Church of France)	France
