= Catholic Church in Niger =

- Hausa: Cocin Katolika a Nijar
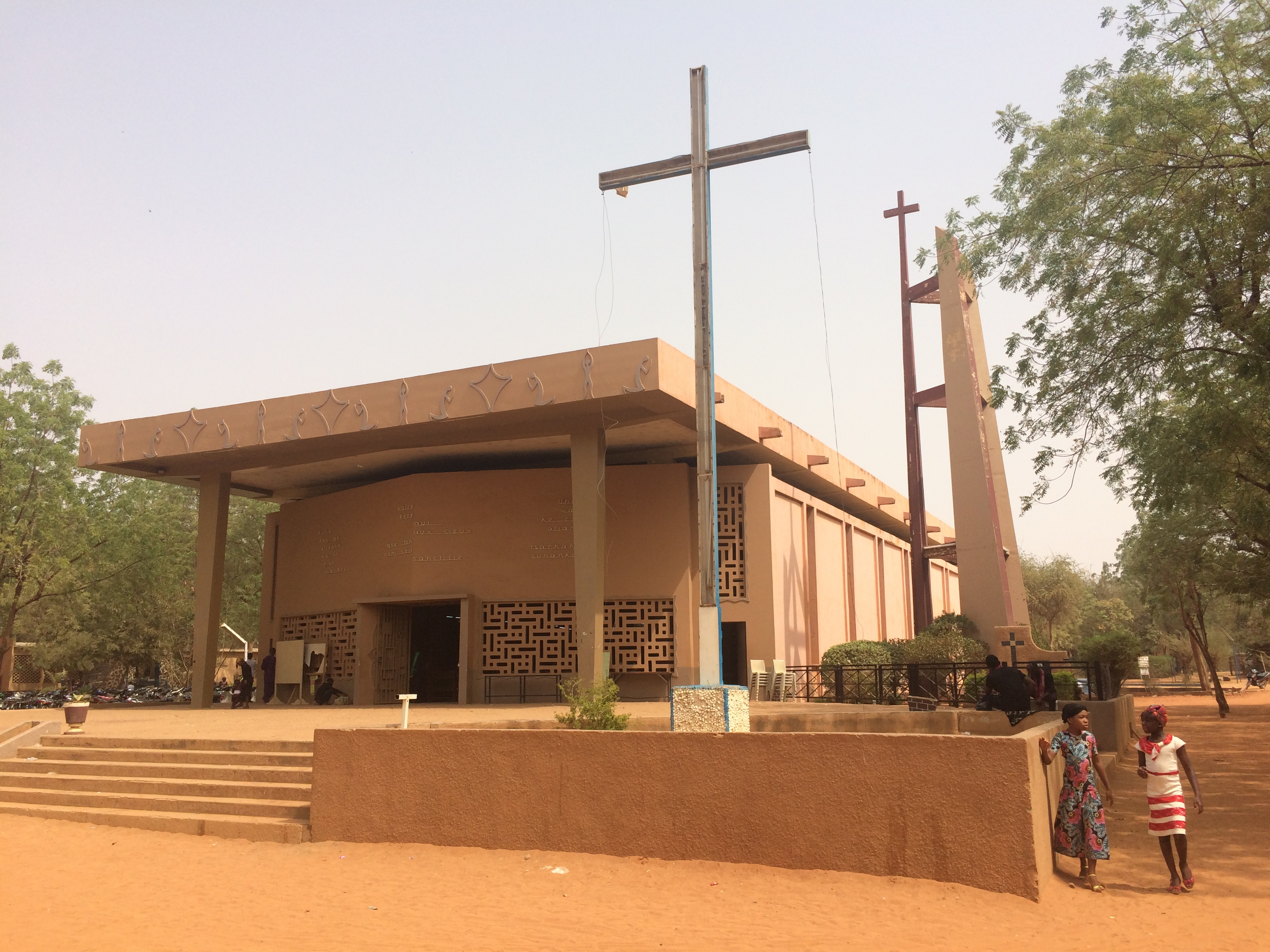
- Cathedral of Our lady of Perpetual Help, Niamey
- Classification: Catholic
- Orientation: Latin
- Scripture: Bible
- Theology: Catholic theology
- Governance: CEBN
- Pope: Leo XIV
- President: Séraphin François Rouamba
- Apostolic Nuncio: Eric Soviguidi
- Region: Niger
- Language: Hausa, Zarma, Latin
- Headquarters: Cathedral of Our lady of Perpetual Help, Niamey
- Members: 20,475 (0.09%)

The Catholic Church in Niger is part of the worldwide Catholic Church, under the spiritual leadership of the Pope in Rome.

In 2005 there were approximately 16,000 Catholics in Niger. They were based in two dioceses: the Diocese of Maradi (approximately 1,000) and the much larger Archdiocese of Niamey (approximately 15,000).

In 2020, figures showed that 0.09% of the country's population was Catholic. In the same year, 61 priests and 88 nuns served across 25 parishes.

The bishops are members of the Conference of Bishops of Burkina Faso and of Niger. Séraphin François Rouamba is the President of the Episcopal Conference and also is Archbishop of Koupela (Burkina Faso). Niger is a member of the Regional Episcopal Conference of Francophone West Africa and Symposium of Episcopal Conferences of Africa and Madagascar.

Since 2025, the Apostolic Nuncio to Niger (and Burkina Faso) is Eric Soviguidi.

== See also ==
- Religion in Niger
- Christianity in Niger
- Apostolic Nunciature to Niger
