= 1997 Queen's Birthday Honours (Australia) =

The 1997 Queen's Birthday Honours for Australia were announced on Monday 9 June 1997 by the office of the Governor-General.

The Birthday Honours were appointments by some of the 16 Commonwealth realms of Queen Elizabeth II to various orders and honours to reward and highlight good works by citizens of those countries. The Birthday Honours are awarded as part of the Queen's Official Birthday celebrations during the month of June.

== Order of Australia ==
=== Companion (AC) ===
==== General Division ====
Recipient	Citation	Notes
His Excellency the Honourable Andrew Sharp Peacock	For service to the Australian Parliament, to politics and for the formulation and implementation of defence and foreign policy.	

=== Officer (AO) ===
==== General Division ====
Recipient	Citation	Notes
Barbara Kaye Alexander	For service to children and adults with disabilities and their families, particularly through the establishment of support groups, the expansion of educational opportunities and raising public awareness throughout Victoria.	
Jock Graham Douglas	For service to primary industry and to conservation, particularly through the Cattlemen's Union of Australia and the Queensland landcare council.	
Nancy Giese, OBE	In recognition of service to the development of tertiary education in the Northern Territory and to the visual and performing arts	
Dr Jack Golson	For service to education, particularly in the fields of pre-history and archaeology research in Asia and the Pacific Region.	
Dr Roy Montague Green	For service to scientific, technological and environmental policy in Australia and marine science.	
The Honourable Clive Edward Griffiths	For service to the Parliament of Western Australia, particularly as President of the Legislative Council, and to the Commonwealth Parliamentary Association.	
John Charles Johnson, APM, QPM	For service to law enforcement, to the development of police education policy throughout Australia and to emergency service organisations.	
Janet Isabel McDonald	For service to women's health programmes, particularly the promotion of breast cancer awareness, to charitable organisations and to arts administration.	
The Honourable Wallace Telford John Murray	For service to the Parliament of New South Wales and to primary industries.	
Howarth Edkins Peterson, CBE	For service to the community, particularly by promoting public awareness and fundraising for cancer research, and to the Salvation Army Red Shield Committee.	
Dr Frederick Bryce Macaulay Phillips	For service to the advancement of public health policies, to the practice of medicine and to the Australian Medical Association.	
Ian Murray Russell, AM, OBE	For service to industry in the areas of manufacturing, trade development and promotion of Australian export markets, and to the community.	
Brian Leonard Sallis	For service to the media, particularly through Advertiser Newspapers Limited, to industry organisations and to the community.	
Professor Richard Alan Smallwood	For service to medicine, particularly in the field of gastroenterology, to research through the National Health and Medical Research Council, and to education.	
Dr David deVaux Weedon	For service to medicine, particularly in the areas of education, pathology and dermatopathology.	
Morris Langlo West, AM	For service to literature.	

=== Member (AM) ===
==== General Division ====
Recipient	Citation	Notes
Helga Margaret Elizabeth Alemson	For service to librarianship, particularly through the Queensland Parliamentary Library and the implementation of an automated information management system.	
Richard Hugh Allert	For service to business and to the community, particularly through the National Heart Foundation.	
Donald Philip Armstrong	For service to the motor trade industry, particularly in the area of industry training and development, and to the community.	
Dr Susan Mitchell Beal	For service to medicine, particularly in the fields of paediatrics and Sudden Infant Death Syndrome research.	
Patrick Brassil	For service to local government, particularly through support for regional development and decentralisation, and to the community.	
Graham Brooke	For service to business and finance and to the community through the administration of public utilities and medical organisations in Victoria.	
Peter John Parnell Burge	For service to cricket as a player, administrator and international referee, and to harness racing.	
Judith Mildred Butt, MBE	For service to paediatric nursing, hospital administration and fundraising.	
Emeritus Professor Douglas Howard Clyde	For service to engineering and professional education and to the Institution of Engineers, Australia.	
Emeritus Professor Hermann Barry Collin	For service to optometric research and education in the Asia-Pacific Region.	
Professor Barry Ernest Conyngham	For service to music as a composer and to music education and administration.	
The Reverend Canon Dr Norman George Curry	For service to education, particularly educational thought and practice for over 40 years.	
Dr Neville James Davis	For service to anaesthesia and to medical education, administration and professional associations.	
Dr Dayalan Manohar Devanesen	For service to medicine in the Northern Territory, particularly in the field of Aboriginal primary health care.	
Margaret Alison Dewsbury	For service to education, particularly through the development and implementation of the 'First Steps Resource' literacy programme.	
Mary Veronica Doughty	For service to social welfare through the Medical Benevolent Association of New South Wales and to the community.	
Dr Sophie Charlotte Ducker	For service to recording the history of botany in Australia, to education and to science, particularly in the field of marine botany.	
Dr Ross Archibald Edwards	For service to music as a composer.	
Trevor Miles Fearnley	For service to homeless youth through the OASIS Youth Centre.	
Dr John Millice Floyd	For service to Australian scientific and industrial research, particularly the process of smelting non-ferrous metals and its commercial development.	
The Honourable Harry Walter Gayfer, OAM	In recognition of service to primary industry, particularly through the Australian grain trade and to the community.	
Humphrey Edward George	For service to the pharmacy profession, at state and national levels, and to the community.	
William Norman Gilmour	For service to medicine as a pioneer of joint replacement and sports surgery and to education.	
Michael Edward Grace	For service to youth as the founder and National Chairperson of the Youth Business Initiative.	
The Reverend Kevin Edward Green	For service to the Uniting Church, particularly through the Wesley Central Mission, Melbourne.	
Ronald Edward Gristwood	For service to otolaryngology, particularly otology, and to education and professional associations.	
Brian Leslie Hamley	For service to the community, particularly through charitable organisations and the Uniting Church, and to the finance sector.	
Professor Stephen Hill	For service to the development of Australia's international relations with Asia and to science and technology policies.	
Brother Charles McKean Howard	For service to the Catholic Church and to the community through the Marist Brothers in Australia and overseas, particularly South Africa, in the fields of education, social justice and reform.	
Warren Henry Hyne	For service to the forest and timber industries, including service in industry organisations, and industry development through forest use practices, research and product development.	
Bernard Jacks, OAM	For service to the community through programmes designed to recognise achievement.	
Warren Frederick Johnson	For service to Australian medicine, particularly urology, in the fields of surgery and research, and to professional associations.	
Stanley David Kelly	For service at state and national levels to people with disabilities, particularly through the national council on intellectual disability, and to the community.	
Neil Leslie Kemmis	For service to the Gunnedah region through local government and community organisations.	
Professor Iven John Klineberg, RFD	For service to dentistry, particularly craniomandibular disorders and oro-facial pain management.	
Dr Leslie Koadlow	For service to medicine, particularly as a rheumatologist specialising in musculoskeletal diseases and rehabilitation, and to the Arthritis Foundation of Victoria.	
Gerhard Francis (Garry) Krauss	For service to the performing acts, particularly through the Victorian State Opera, and to youth.	
Professor Allan Ogilvie Langlands	For service to medicine, particularly in the field of radiation oncology and its application to breast cancer treatment.	
Emeritus Professor Robert John Lawrence	For service to the discipline of social work internationally, and as the first Professor of Social Work in Australia, to the development of social policy research and to community agencies.	
Professor Robert Barry Leal	For service to tertiary education in the fields of administration and modern languages, and to the community.	
Professor Marilyn Myrtle McMeniman	For service to education in the fields of curriculum theory and practice, language acquisition, research and administration.	
Dr Raymond Francis Martyres	For service to the community through fundraising for the bone marrow donor institute and its related laboratories.	
Robert William Matthewson	For service to trade development and diplomatic relations between the Northern Territory and South East Asia.	
Elizabeth Therese Mattner	For service to the Cooma-Monaro region through local government and community organisations.	
Professor Geoffrey Grant Meredith	For service to tertiary business education and the development of small enterprise in Australia and the Asia-Pacific Region.	
Professor Robert David Milns	For service to education, particularly in the fields of classics and ancient history, and to the community.	
Richard Morris	For service to the Northern Territory community, particularly through St John Ambulance Australia, and to business development.	
James Lloyd Morrison	For service to music, particularly jazz, and the sponsorship of young musicians.	
Diana Denise Newman	For service to accountancy, particularly in the areas of insolvency and trusteeship, and to the community.	
Dr Robert John Oakeshott	For service to medicine at national and international levels in the fields of rehabilitation medicine and disability, and to education.	
Professor Darcy William O'Gorman Hughes	For service to medicine, particularly in the fields of paediatric oncology and haematology.	
Rita Bridget Rice O'Keeffe	For service to the community, particularly through the Australian Red Cross at state and national levels.	
Ida Mary Overton	For service to the community, particularly through support for the arts and medical research.	
Dr John William James Parry	For service to the community of Narrogin, to emergency medicine in remote areas and to local government.	
Robert William Peck	For service to the practice of architecture, urban design and development, particularly through statutory and regulatory authorities.	
James William Priest	For service to youth through the Queensland Branch of the Scout Association of Australia and for promoting scouting in the Asia Pacific Region.	
Thomas William Prior	For service to the community of Central Australia, particularly through the pastoral industry.	
Professor Patrick Gerard Quilty	For service to geoscience, particularly Australian Antarctic scientific research, and its promotion internationally.	
Paul Henry Ramler	For service to education administration in the fields of course accreditation, curriculum construction and educational organisation.	
Dr Keith Desmond Reeve	For service to science, particularly in the field of ceramics technology, and to education.	
Ronald Morgan Richards	For service to the newspaper industry, tourism and the community.	
Enid Lucy Robertson	For service to botany, particularly the conservation and management of native vegetation in South Australia, and to the community.	
The Reverend David Andrew Robinson	For service to the Uniting Church in Australia, particularly in the field of human relationships, and to the community.	
His Honour John Herbert Roder	For service to urban and regional planning, the law and the community.	
Bruce Carlyle Ruxton, OBE	For service to the welfare of the ex-service community.	
Russell James Scott	For service to the law, particularly in the field of bioethics, and to law reform.	
Michael Stanley Shanahan	For service to primary industry, particularly through the Australian grain trade.	
Richard John Smith	For service to international relations, particularly in the areas of commerce and trade.	
Elaine Junette Swain	For service to children with disabilities and their families, particularly through the association 'Wings Away'.	
Amy Katherine Taylor, OAM	For service to veterans, particularly through the Australian Women's Army Service, and the Education Committee of the 'Australia Remembers' programme.	
Stephen William Vizard	For service to the community, particularly through the Vizard Foundation, and to the arts.	
Valda Helen Wiles	For service to clinical nursing practice, particularly in critical care areas, and to education.	
Dr Brian Robert Williams, RFD	For service to medicine through the development and implementation of general practice services in rural and remote areas of Western Australia.	
Professor Geoffrey Victor Herbert Wilson	For service to tertiary education and administration, to business and regional development in Central Queensland, and to physics.	
Stewart Yesner	For service to people with disabilities through the development and promotion of research into spinal cord injury.	
Henry Hugo Young	For service to the community through the Hank Young Foundation for Aboriginal Welfare and Education.	

==== Military Division ====
Branch	Recipient	Citation	Notes
Navy	Commodore Kim Frederick Peter Pitt RAN	For exceptional service to the RAN, especially as Chief of Staff in the Naval Support Command.	
Army	Brigadier Darryl Charles Low Choy, MBE, RFD	For exceptional service to the Army as the Commander 1st Training Group and the Commander of the 7th Brigade.	
Army	Brigadier William Traynor	For exceptional service as the Commander of the Army Technology and Engineering Agency and Director General Plans and Programs – Army.	
Air Force	Group Captain Brian Stanley Duddington ADC	For exceptional service to the RAAF in the field of logistics operations.	
Air Force	Wing Commander Paul John McCann	For exceptional service to the RAAF in the field of air lift operations.	

=== Medal (OAM) ===
==== General Division ====
Recipient	Citation	Notes
Cordelia May Allen	For service to women through community health and church organisations.	
Richard Andrew Anderson	For service to people with visual impairments and to fundraising for the arts.	
Dr Peter Edward Andry	For service to music, particularly through the Australian Music Foundation.	
John Leo Armati	For service to the newspaper industry in rural New South Wales and to the community.	
Sydney Atkins	For service to the community of the Illawarra region, particularly through public health organisations.	
Christopher Lawrence Austin	For service to the community.	
Colin George Parker Ayres	For service to agriculture, particularly through the potato industry, to local government and to the community.	
James McKinley Baker	For service to the community through organising celebrations to explore and promote a sense of national identity.	
The Reverend Bruce Albert Ballantine-Jones	For service to the Anglican Church and to the community.	
George Michael Barbouttis	For service to people with hearing impairments, particularly through the Deaf Society of New South Wales, and to the Greek community.	
Malcolm Wentworth Barker	For service to veterans, particularly through the 42nd Australian Infantry Battalion.	
Emeritus Professor Weston Arthur Bate	For service to the study of history and the preservation of Victoria's heritage.	
Reginald John Bateup	For service to veterans, particularly through the Temora Sub-Branch of the Returned and Services League of Australia, and to the community.	
Frank Belan	For service to the trade union movement, particularly through the National Union of Workers.	
Walter Allan Bishop	For service to veterans, particularly through the HMAS Perth Association.	
Rodney David Blackmore	For service to the welfare of children through the judicial system and to the community.	
Dr William Henry Blair	For service to tertiary education and business, particularly through the Queensland University of Technology Foundation, and to the community.	
The Reverend Dr John Francis Bodycomb	For service to the promotion of religious freedom and to fostering ecumenicism.	
Olive Joyce Bowly	For service to people with disabilities and their families, particularly through the Gold Coast Family Support Group, and to the community.	
Gordon Douglas Boyd	For service to the welfare of veterans and their families.	
Thomas Briggs	For service to Aboriginal people in Armidale and surrounding areas, particularly through community development programmes.	
Karoline Brodaty	For service to the community, particularly through the Australian Friends of the Foundation for the Adoption of Abandoned Children.	
Edwin Allan Bryant	For service to community organisations in Dubbo.	
Thelma Doreen (Poppy) Burgess	For service to the community, particularly through the South Australian Branch of the Australian Red Cross.	
Reginald Joseph Butler	For service to surf lifesaving, particularly through the establishment and promotion of the junior movement.	
Edward Thomas Byrne	For service to the community, particularly through fundraising activities supported by the Merrylands Returned and Services Club, and to veterans.	
Viola Joyce Carr	For service to the Cactus and Succulent Society of South Australia.	
Courtney Patricia Clark	For service to the food and catering industry.	
Leonard Prospere Coleman	For service to the community, particularly through the Society of St Vincent de Paul.	
Robert James Cornish	For service to the community of Cobram and to the soft fruits industry.	
Francis Aloysius Costa	For service youth and to the community of Geelong.	
Harry William Craber	For service to veterans, particularly through the 6th Division AIF, and to the community.	
Albert George Cunningham	For service to the community, particularly Vietnam Veterans.	
Anthony Bowen Daniels	For service to the manufacturing industry, particularly through microeconomic reform.	
Lewis Ross Davis	For service to industry, particularly through the Australian Foundry Institute.	
Kenneth George (Mick) Day	For service to the community of Bundaberg.	
Bulent Hass Dellal	For service to multicultural organisations, the arts, and the community.	
Elizabeth Marjorie Delzoppo	For service to the community, particularly in the Gippsland region.	
Roger Norman Dickson	For service to hospital management and to the community.	
Colin Wauchope Dodd	For service to the community of Warwick and to education, particularly as Deputy Principal of Warwick State High School.	
Sister St Jude Doyle	For service to social welfare, particularly through the Sisters of Charity Outreach Programme, and to rural committees.	
Alan Edgar Druery	For service to education, particularly through the Queensland Catholic Education Commission.	
William Duncan	For service to veterans, particularly through Mt Lawley-Inglewood Sub-Branch of the Returned and Services League of Australia, and to the community.	
John Edward Ralph Dunkley	For service to the community through the Salvation Army Emergency Services, South Australia.	
Leo Matthew Dunne	For service to families through the Federation of Parents and Friends Associations of Queensland.	
Mignon Laurenti Ellicott	For service to the community as benefactor of the Laurenti Ellicott Awards for Excellence in Public Relations in South Australia, and as a donor to charitable and other organisations.	
John Locke Estens	For service to the community and to amateur astronomy.	
Moya Rachel Evans	For service to people with disabilities, particularly through music therapy programmes.	
Raymond Thomas Fahey	For service to veterans, particularly through the HMAS Canberra-Shropshire Association in Tasmania, and to the community.	
Geoffrey William Falkenmire	For service to education, particularly literacy programmes, and to veterans.	
Claude Augustus Fay	For service to the community, particularly through 'Kidsafe', the church, education, retirement villages and sporting organisations, and to the environment.	
Robin Heath Fildes	For service to sport as an administrator.	
Colin Murray Fisher	For service to the Parliament of New South Wales, local government and the community of the Hunter region.	
Margaret Anne Fisk	For service to people with disabilities and their families as founder of the Defence Special Needs Support Group.	
Dr Stephen Paul Gatt	For service to medicine, particularly in the field of obstetric anaesthesia.	
Albert Beau Edward Gerring	For service to boxing, particularly as a coach for Olympic and Commonwealth Games events.	
The Venerable Edward George Gibson	For service to the community, particularly through the Anglican Church.	
Francis Hugh Xavier Gillen	For service to veterans, particularly through the 2/6th Battalion Association, and to the community.	
Stanislaw Gotowicz	For service to the Polish community in South Australia, and to multiculturalism through cultural and social activities.	
Tasman Thomas Gower	For service to aged care, particularly through the Lady Clark Geriatric Centre.	
John Spencer Graham	For service to the development and implementation of sport and recreation programmes in Western Australia.	
Noel Francis Granger	For service to the community, particularly through the Victorian Taxi Association.	
Noella Maisie Greenham	For service to amateur athletics in South Australia as an administrator and official.	
Reginald John Gregor	For service to charitable organisations through the painting and auctioning of 'charity tents'.	
John Gully	For service to youth, particularly through Lord Somers' Camp and Power House, and to the community.	
Michael Cyril Hall	For service to veterans through the Western Australia Branch of the Returned and Services League of Australia.	
Dorothy Alice Hamilton	For service to the community as an entertainer for service groups and retired people for over 50 years.	
Jan William (John) Hartgerink	For service to the aged, particularly through the Northaven Retirement Village.	
June Joy Hayes	For service to community health, particularly through the Asthma Foundation of New South Wales.	
Lesley Alfred Hemley, MBE	For service to local government, the cattle industry and the community of Wickepin.	
Edna Beatrice Hertrick	For service to sport, particularly women's softball.	
Frank Hesman, BEM	For service to the community, particularly through multicultural organisations in Tasmania.	
Harold Neil Hewitt	For service to the community, particularly through the St George's Hospital, Kew.	
John Percy Holroyd	For service to the retail book trade and to the recording of its history in Australia.	
Kevin Frederick Hoskins	For service to the surf lifesaving movement for over 40 years.	
Jocelyn Houghton	For service to the community, particularly through the Canterbury Group of Community Aid Abroad.	
Reginald John Howard	For service to veterans and to the community of Dungog.	
Diana Winifred Humphries	For service to people with disabilities, to support groups for women and to music education.	
To Ha Huynh	For service to culturally based welfare organisations including the Indo-China Chinese Association.	
Frederick Harold Hyde	For service to child welfare and international relations through the CO-ID (Co-Operation In Development) Programme in Bangladesh and to the community of Warwick.	
Alison Jean Ide	For service to veterans' tennis as a player, administrator and selector.	
Marjorie James	For service to the community, particularly through the United Hospitals Auxiliaries of New South Wales and to Manly Hospital through the Balgowlah-Seaforth Auxiliary.	
Barrington Noel Jarman	For service to sport as a cricket player, coach and international cricket referee and to horse racing in South Australia.	
Gwenyth Rita Jenkinson	For service to people with visual impairments, particularly glaucoma.	
Kathleen Mary Jennings	For service to the community through many voluntary organisations including Australian Red Cross, CWA and church groups.	
Mavis Annie Judd	For service to the community as a fundraiser through the Leura Gardens Festival Committee.	
Zetta Karay	For service to the community through the South Australian Branch of the National Council of Women, and Soroptimist International.	
Brother James Antoninus Kelly	For service to education in the field of mathematics.	
Winifred Maisie Kingston	For service to the community, particularly through the Glenview Nursing Home Ladies Auxiliary and the War Widows Guild, Tasmania.	
Dr Elsie Koadlow	For service to the medical and allied professions as a psychotherapist and educator, particularly in the fields of sexual and relationship therapy.	
The Reverend Monsignor John Barry Lennon	For service to the Catholic Church and to education.	
Warren Lomas Leo	For service to the community, particularly South Sea Islanders, and to sporting groups.	
Dr Sydney Levine	For service to dentistry, particularly in the fields of periodontics and dental history.	
Helen Ling	For service to the community through the Dodges Ferry Division of St John Ambulance.	
Penelope Ann Little	For service to the community, particularly through the Westmead Hospital Arts Society.	
Philip Loffman, ED	For service to veterans through recording the history of the 2/28th Battalion and the 24th Anti-Tank Company.	
Robert Russell Longmire	For service to the community, particularly through the Ryder Cheshire Foundation of South Australia.	
Victor Samuel Ludwig	For service to the Australian rules football, particularly in the Northern Territory.	
Ronald James Macadam	For service to sport as an administrator, umpire, coach and player.	
Alan McConachie	For service to people with visual impairments, particularly through the Queensland Blind Soldiers of St Dunstan's Association and the Queensland Blind Bowlers Association.	
Mary McCracken	For service to nursing by assisting with the rehabilitation of people with poliomyelitis.	
Monteith William McDonald	For service to veterans' golf as a player, promoter and administrator.	
Ross McGlashan	For service to motor sport as Australian land speed record holder.	
Jean McGrath	For service to youth through the guide movement and to the community of Coffs Harbour.	
Alasdair McGregor	For service to the law and the community in the Northern Territory.	
The Reverend Malcolm Donald Macleod	For service to the community, particularly through the Uniting Church, and to theological education.	
Conrad Wilfred Mader	For service to music, particularly as a conductor of performances for schools, churches, and retired people.	
Beverley Vickery (Judy) Major	For service to the community, in particular to Barnardo's Canberra and Sydney.	
Dr Owen Francis Makinson	For service to dentistry in the fields of dental materials, instruments and equipment and to education.	
Geoffrey William Maley	For service to people with hearing impairments, particularly through the Western Australia Deaf Recreation Association.	
Bernard Francis Malouf	For service to the aged community of Coffs Harbour, particularly through the Society of St Vincent de Paul, and to local government.	
Donald McLeod Marles	For service to education as the Headmaster of Trinity Grammar School, Kew.	
Heather May Martin	For service to the community as music director of the Murwillumbah Philharmonic Society and related groups and to music education.	
Montague Thomas Martin	For service to the community of Mackay, particularly through Rotary International.	
Kathleen Margaret Marvell	For service to the community of Wyong and surrounding districts.	
Douglas Mathews	For service to the community, particularly through the United Protestant Association of New South Wales.	
Dr Roger Gregory Mauldon	For service to public administration through the Industry Commission and to the community.	
Dorothy June Meagher	For service to conservation and the environment, particularly through the Blackburn Lake Sanctuary Visitors Education Centre.	
Doris Jessie Miles	For service to the community, particularly through hospital auxiliaries in Central Victoria.	
Leonard Victor Miles	For service to the trade union movement through the Tasmanian Branch of the Construction, Forestry, Mining and Energy Union.	
Lorna May Morrison	For service to the community through service clubs, particularly Lions International.	
Eileen Daphne Murphy	For service to sport through the Queensland Athletic Association Limited.	
Lillian Mary (Mollie) Newbold	For service to the community, particularly youth, through scouting, fundraising and craft works.	
Ronald Leslie Newitt	For service to the community through the RAAF Reserve and No. 23 Squadron Association (Qld) RAAF.	
Edward Andreas Nilsen	For service to the community of Broken Hill as a member and supporter of charitable organisations.	
The Reverend Father Gabriel Arthur Nolan	For service to the Catholic Church and to education.	
Patricia Mildred O'Brien	For service to the aged, particularly through the Society of St Vincent de Paul.	
Patricia Joan O'Hara	For service to the community of Cairns, particularly as a human rights campaigner for social justice.	
Barry Joseph O'Mara	For service to the building and construction industry through the Master Builders Association of New South Wales in the areas of arbitration and mediation.	
Dell Ann O'Sullivan	For service to people with disabilities and the aged in the community, particularly through music programmes.	
Patricia Irene O'Sullivan	For service to child welfare, particularly through the Meerilinga Young Children's Foundation.	
John Patrick Orbansen	For service to the community of Coolangatta-Tweed Heads through service clubs, ex-service organisations and the pony club movement.	
Ralph Berger Orth	For service to the community through the Brisbane Ward of the Church of Jesus Christ of Latter Day Saints.	
Irwin Royd Palmer	For service to the community, particularly through the Salvation Army's crisis, rehabilitation and music programmes.	
Betty Olive Peters	For service to nursing as a clinician and academic and to veterans and their families.	
Mavis Claire Pirola	For service to youth, particularly in establishing the Antioch Youth Movement.	
Professor Romano Cesare (Ron) Pirola	For service to youth, particularly in establishing the Antioch Youth Movement.	
Trevor William Plumb, MBE	For service to adult education, particularly through the University of the Third Age.	
Clive William Price	For service to conservation and the environment through forest management and tree planting programmes and to the community.	
Kenneth Maxwell Randall	For service to journalism and public affairs, particularly through the National Press Club, and to the community.	
Dr Akkinepalli Badri Narayan Rao	For service to medicine as an ear, nose and throat specialist in the Northern Territory.	
Phillip Herbert Renkin	(Ret'd). For service to the community, particularly through ex-service and sporting groups.	
Joan Margaret Richards	For service to music, particularly through the Opera Singers of Canberra and the ACT Lieder Society.	
Alan Charles Richmond	For service to youth, particularly through the Baden Powell Scout Association, and to the community.	
Lynn Marie Ritchie	For service to the community, particularly through Citizen Radio Emergency Teams (CREST) in the SouthernHighlands.	
Ronald Bernard Robson, AFSM	For service to the community of Kilmore, particularly through the development of water and sewerage services.	
Joy Roggenkamp	For service to contemporary art in the medium of watercolour and as a judge.	
Robert Alfred Ross	For service to the community as an educator and counsellor by devising programmes to support students, particularly Aboriginals, during periods of educational transition.	
Stanley Clifford Sadleir	For service to the racing industry, veterans, sport and the community.	
Dr Nouria Sultana Fazel Salehi	For service to human rights, particularly through the Afghan community, and to refugees and women's support groups.	
Dr Joseph Natalino Santamaria	For service to community health, particularly in the fields of alcohol and drug addiction.	
Adrian Scott, MBE	For service to the media as a rural broadcaster and to the community.	
John Hendry Shaw	For service to the community, particularly as an advocate for improving mental health services, and to education.	
Ronald William Shepherd	For service to hospital administration in an honorary capacity for many years and to the community.	
Kathleen Lois Short	For service to the community of Katherine and to local government.	
Albert George Shute	For service to veterans, particularly through the Lidcombe Sub-Branch of the Returned and Services League of Australia.	
Socrates Socratous	For service to the Greek community through church, education and sporting groups.	
Dorothy Jean Softley	For service to the community, particularly the aged.	
Chief Petty Officer Glenn William Spilsted	For service to the community through the Clearance Diving Association.	
Nicole Dawn Stevenson	For service to swimming as a representative at state, national and international levels.	
Leslie Tapp	For service to tennis administration at club and state levels for many years.	
Peter Frederick Taylor	For service to surf lifesaving as an administrator at club, state and national levels.	
Arthur James Thompson	For service to veterans, particularly through the Coolamon Sub-Branch of the Returned and Services League of Australia, and to the community.	
Canon Ronald Desmond Tyson, ED	For service to veterans, particularly as an honorary chaplain for ex-service organisations.	
Roger Stuart James Valentine	For service to the community through honorary appointments and in the area of public administration.	
Robert John Veall	For service to veterans, particularly through the Tamworth Sub-Branch of the Returned and Services League of Australia.	
Therese Mary Von Samorzewski	For service to the Catholic education system in Tasmania.	
The late Edna Helen Vukmirovic	For service to the arts through the Dandenong Festival of Music and Art for Youth.	
Mavis Waldegrave	For service to youth through theGuide movement in New South Wales.	
Christine Margaret Walters	For service to the community, particularly through the Tamworth Aboriginal Respite Care Centre.	
Alfred Robert Warner	For service to children as a volunteer worker through the Camp Quality programme.	
Sonia Dorothy Watts	For service to people with disabilities, particularly through the Schizophrenia Fellowship of South Queensland.	
Joyce Catherine Webster	For service to the community of Bundaberg through local organisations including the RSPCA.	
Rosemary Janet Webster	For service to the community, particularly through the Schizophrenia Fellowship of Victoria by improving services for people with mental illness and their carers.	
Ivan Grattan Wheaton, RFD, ED	For service to regimental and military history and to the South Australian branch of the Royal Geographical Society of Australia.	
Kathleen Marjorie Williams	For service to the development of community health care programmes and services on Kangaroo Island as Director of Nursing of the local hospital.	
Charles James Neville Wilson	For service to the community of Mount Gambier, particularly through social welfare, veterans' and learning programmes.	
Stephen James Wilson	For service to ornithological research, bird banding and to the community.	
Dr Ronald Richmond Winton	For service to medicine, particularly in the fields of medical publication, history and ethics.	
The late John Woodhead	For service to the community through programmes sponsored by Rotary, particularly SHINE ON Awards.	
Harold Richard Yeend	For service to veterans through the Rose Bay Sub-Branch of the Returned and Services League of Australia.	
Christina May Yeomans	For service to the rural community, particularly through the Gold Coast based Save the Farm Fund.	

==== Military Division ====
Branch	Recipient	Citation	Notes
Navy	Lieutenant Bertram Keith Slape, RAN	For meritorious service to the RAN, particularly as the Fleet Intermediate Maintenance Activity Planning/Production Manager at HMAS Playtpus.	
Army	Warrant Officer Class One Christopher Thomas Holland	For meritorious service with the 1st Armoured Regiment.	
Army	Warrant Officer Class One Christopher John Holmes	For meritorious service to the Army as Regimental Sergeant Major of 10th Terminal Regiment, Brisbane Logistic Group and 4th Training Group.	
Army	Major Linda Anne Moffat	For meritorious service to the Army as a member of the Defence Reserves Support Committee (Queensland) and as the Secretary of the Board of Directors of the South Queensland Army Holiday Resort.	
Army	Warrant Officer Class One Joseph Raymond Dale Sales	For meritorious service in the regimental and training fields.	
Air Force	Flight Sergeant Lorraine Lillian Taylor	For meritorious service to the RAAF in the field of training management.	
Air Force	Sergeant Peter Wilhelm Weier	For meritorious service to the RAAF in the field of aircraft structural maintenance.	
