= Episcopal conference =

Assembly of bishops of some nation or certain territory of the Latin Church

An episcopal conference, often also called a bishops' conference or conference of bishops, is an official assembly of the bishops of the Catholic Church in a given territory. Episcopal conferences have long existed as informal entities. The first assembly of bishops to meet regularly, with its own legal structure and ecclesial leadership function, was the Swiss Bishops' Conference, which was founded in 1863. More than forty episcopal conferences existed before the Second Vatican Council. Their status was confirmed by the Second Vatican Council and further defined by Pope Paul VI's 1966 motu proprio, Ecclesiae sanctae.

Episcopal conferences are generally defined by geographic borders, often national ones, with all the bishops in a given country belonging to the same conference, although they may also include neighboring countries. Certain authority and tasks are assigned to episcopal conferences, particularly with regard to setting the liturgical norms for the Mass, a role affirmed in the Second Vatican Council's Constitution on the Sacred Liturgy. Episcopal conferences receive their authority under universal law or particular mandates. In certain circumstances, as defined by canon law, the decisions of an episcopal conference are subject to ratification from the Holy See. Individual bishops do not relinquish their immediate authority for the governance of their respective dioceses to the conference.

== Theological and juridical status ==
The Second Vatican Council noted with approval in 1965 that many episcopal conferences had been formed and were proving effective means of co-operation among bishops. As a result, the Council proposed that bishops everywhere should form such conferences, prescribing that each conference should formulate its own statutes, "for recognition by the Apostolic See". Their operation, authority, and responsibilities are currently governed by the 1983 Code of Canon Law (see especially canons 447–459) In addition, there are assemblies of bishops which include the bishops of different rites in a nation, both Eastern Catholic and Latin Catholic; these are described in canon 322 §2 of the Code of Canons of the Eastern Churches.

The nature of episcopal conferences, and their magisterial authority in particular, was subsequently clarified by Pope John Paul II in his 1998 motu proprio, Apostolos suos, which stated that the declarations of such conferences "constitute authentic magisterium" when approved unanimously by the conference; otherwise the conference must achieve a two-thirds majority and seek the recognitio, that is, recognition of approval, of the Holy See, which they will not receive if the majority "is not substantial".

In the 2013 apostolic exhortation, Evangelii Gaudium, Pope Francis expressed his concern that the intent of the Second Vatican Council, which would give episcopal conferences "genuine doctrinal authority, has not yet been sufficiently elaborated". On September 9, 2017, Pope Francis modified canon law, granting episcopal conferences specific authority "to faithfully prepare … approve and publish the liturgical books for the regions for which they are responsible after the confirmation of the Apostolic See". The Congregation for Divine Worship and the Discipline of the Sacraments, which formerly had primary responsibility for translations, was ordered to "help the Episcopal Conferences to fulfil their task". On October 22, 2017, the Holy See released a letter that Pope Francis had sent to the Prefect of the Congregation for Divine Worship and the Discipline of the Sacraments, Cardinal Robert Sarah, clarifying that the Holy See and its departments would have only limited authority to confirm liturgical translations recognized by a local episcopal conference. In late February, 2018, the Council of Cardinals and Pope Francis undertook a consideration of the theological status of episcopal conferences, re-reading Pope John Paul II's Apostolos Suos in the light of Pope Francis's Evangelii Gaudium.

== List of episcopal conferences ==
=== Africa ===
1. Episcopal Conference of Angola and São Tomé
2. Episcopal Conference of Benin
3. Conference of Bishops of Burkina Faso and of Niger
4. Conference of Catholic Bishops of Burundi
5. National Episcopal Conference of Cameroon
6. Central African Episcopal Conference
7. Episcopal Conference of Chad
8. Episcopal Conference of the Congo
9. Episcopal Conference of the Democratic Republic of the Congo
10. Episcopal Conference of the Côte d'Ivoire
11. Episcopal Conference of Equatorial Guinea
12. Catholic Bishops' Conference of Ethiopia and Eritrea
13. Episcopal Conference of Gabon
14. Inter-territorial Catholic Bishops' Conference of The Gambia and Sierra Leone
15. Ghana Bishops' Conference
16. Episcopal Conference of Guinea
17. Episcopal Conference of the Indian Ocean (Note: The Episcopal Conference of the Indian Ocean includes the bishops of Comoros, Mauritius, Réunion, Mayotte and Seychelles.)
18. Kenya Conference of Catholic Bishops
19. Lesotho Catholic Bishops' Conference
20. Catholic Bishops' Conference of Liberia
21. Episcopal Conference of Madagascar
22. Episcopal Conference of Malawi
23. Episcopal Conference of Mali
24. Episcopal Conference of Mozambique
25. Namibian Catholic Bishops' Conference
26. Catholic Bishops' Conference of Nigeria
27. Regional Episcopal Conference of North Africa (Note: The Regional Episcopal Conference of North Africa includes the bishops of Algeria, Libya, Morocco, and Tunisia.)
28. Conference of Catholic Bishops of Rwanda
29. Conference of Bishops of Senegal, Mauritania, Cape Verde, and Guinea Bissau
30. Southern African Catholic Bishops' Conference (SACBC) (Note: The Southern African Catholic Bishops' Conference includes the bishops of South Africa, Botswana, and Eswatini.)
31. Sudan Catholic Bishops' Conference (Note: The Sudan Catholic Bishops' Conference includes the bishops of Sudan and South Sudan.)
32. Tanzania Episcopal Conference
33. Episcopal Conference of Togo
34. Uganda Episcopal Conference
35. Zambia Episcopal Conference
36. Zimbabwe Catholic Bishops' Conference

=== Asia ===
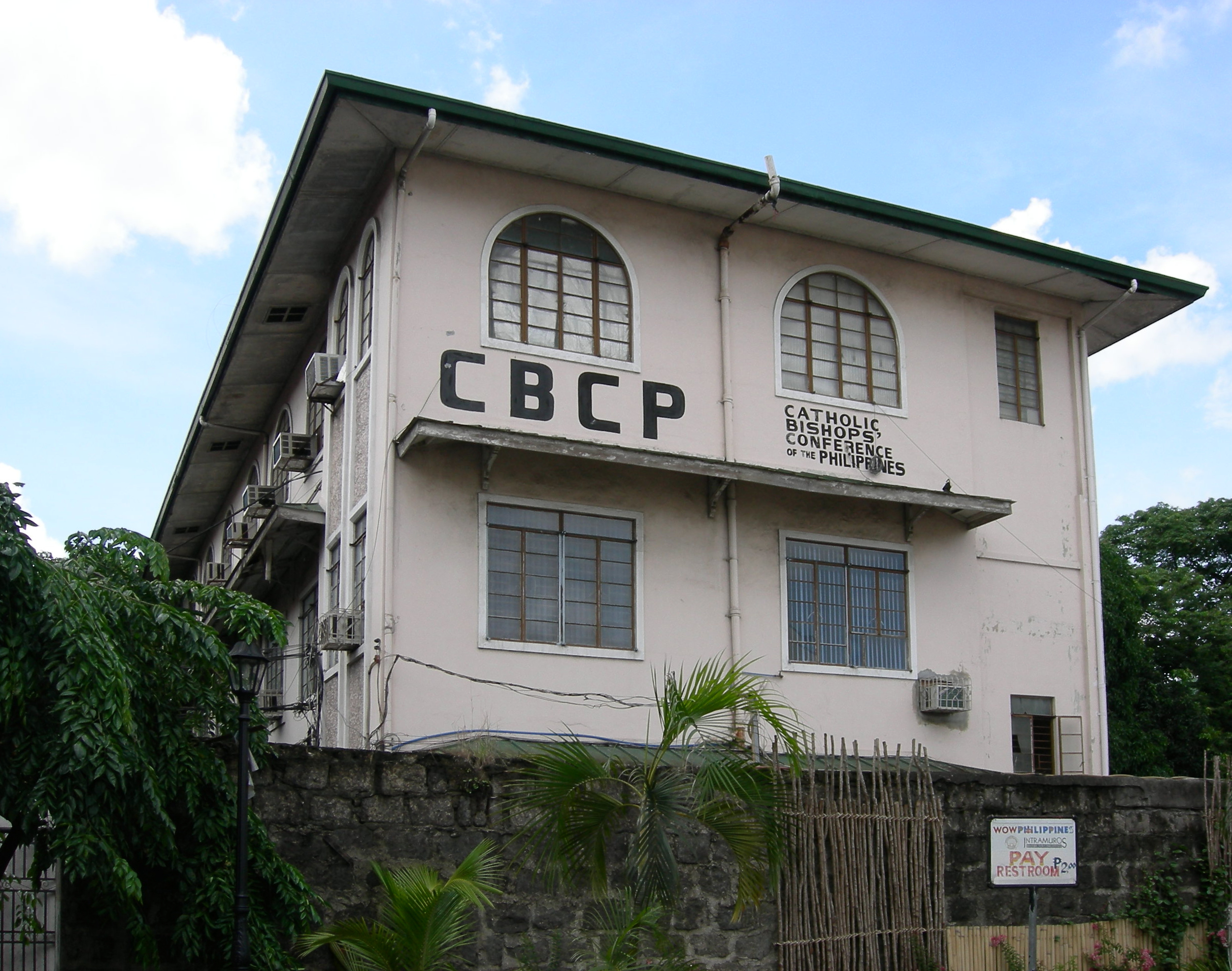
Headquarters of the Catholic Bishops' Conference of the Philippines in Manila

1. Conference of the Latin Bishops of the Arab Regions (Note: The Conference of the Latin Bishops of the Arab Regions includes the bishops in Arab states of the Middle East, North Africa, East Africa and Cyprus.)
2. Catholic Bishops' Conference of Bangladesh
3. Bishops' Conference of Central Asia (Note: The Bishops' Conference of Central Asia includes the bishops of Kazakhstan, Kyrgyzstan, Tajikistan, Turkmenistan and Uzbekistan.)
4. Chinese Regional Bishops' Conference
5. Conference of Catholic Bishops of India (CCBI)
6. Bishops' Conference of Indonesia (KWI)
7. Catholic Bishops' Conference of Japan
8. Catholic Bishops' Conference of Korea
9. Episcopal Conference of Laos and Cambodia
10. Catholic Bishops' Conference of Malaysia, Singapore and Brunei (CBCMSB)
11. Catholic Bishops' Conference of Myanmar
12. Catholic Bishops' Conference of Pakistan
13. Catholic Bishops' Conference of the Philippines
14. Catholic Bishops' Conference of Thailand
15. Episcopal Conference of Turkey
16. Catholic Bishops' Conference of Sri Lanka
17. Catholic Bishops' Conference of Vietnam

=== Europe ===
Headquarters of the Lithuanian Bishops' Conference in Vilnius

1. Episcopal Conference of Albania
2. Austrian Bishops' Conference
3. Conference of Catholic Bishops of Belarus
4. Episcopal Conference of Belgium
5. Commission of the Bishops' Conferences of the European Union
6. Bishops' Conference of Bosnia and Herzegovina
7. Episcopal Conference of Bulgaria
8. Croatian Bishops' Conference
9. Czech Bishops' Conference
10. Catholic Bishops' Conference of England and Wales
11. Bishops' Conference of France (CEF)
12. German Bishops' Conference
13. Holy Synod of Catholic Bishops of Greece
14. Catholic Bishops' Conference of Hungary
15. Irish Catholic Bishops' Conference (Note: The Irish Catholic Bishops' Conference includes the bishops of the Republic of Ireland and Northern Ireland.)
16. Italian Episcopal Conference (CEI)
17. Latvian Bishops' Conference
18. Lithuanian Bishops' Conference
19. Maltese Episcopal Conference
20. Bishops' Conference of the Netherlands
21. Polish Episcopal Conference
22. Portuguese Episcopal Conference
23. Romanian Episcopal Conference
24. Conference of Catholic Bishops of the Russian Federation
25. International Bishops' Conference of Saints Cyril and Methodius (Note: Formerly the Bishops' Conference of Yugoslavia (1918—1993) and the Bishops' Conference of the Federal Republic of Yugoslavia (1997-2005). Includes the bishops of Serbia, Montenegro, Kosovo, and Macedonia.)
26. Scandinavian Bishops Conference (Note: The Scandinavian Bishops Conference includes the bishops of Denmark, Finland, Iceland, Norway and Sweden.)
27. Bishops' Conference of Scotland
28. Conference of Slovak Bishops
29. Slovenian Bishops' Conference
30. Spanish Episcopal Conference
31. Swiss Bishops Conference
32. Ukrainian Episcopal Conference

=== Oceania ===
1. Australian Catholic Bishops Conference
2. New Zealand Catholic Bishops' Conference
3. Episcopal Conference of the Pacific (C.E. PAC.) (Note: The Episcopal Conference of the Pacific is made up of the bishops of American Samoa, Cook Islands, Fiji, French Polynesia, Guam, Kiribati, Marshall Islands, Micronesia, New Caledonia, Northern Mariana Islands, Palau, Samoa, Tonga, Tuvalu, Vanuatu and Wallis and Futuna..)
4. Catholic Bishops Conference of Papua New Guinea and Solomon Islands

=== North America ===
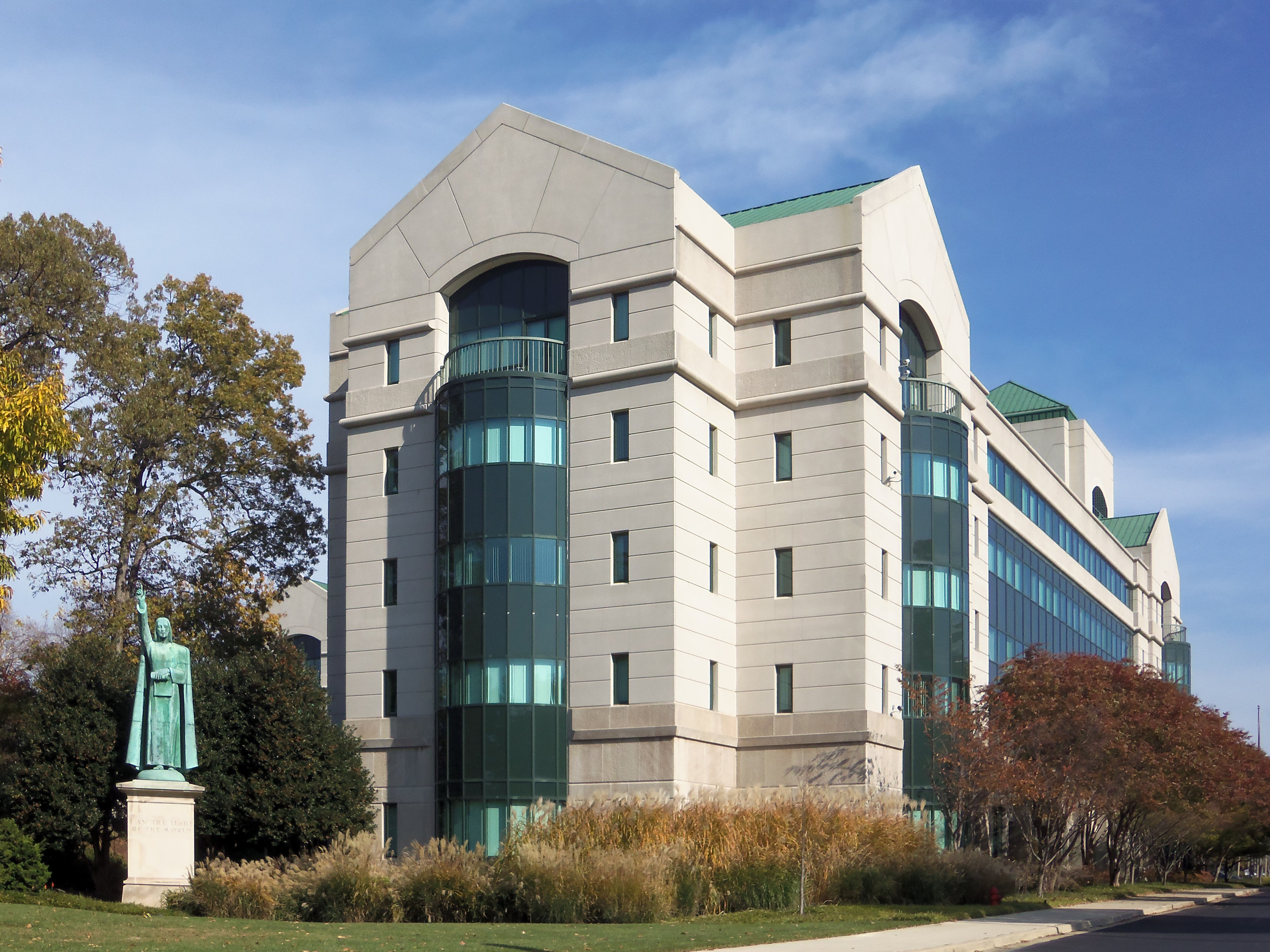
Headquarters of the United States Conference of Catholic Bishops in Washington, DC

1. Antilles Episcopal Conference
2. Canadian Conference of Catholic Bishops (CCCB)
3. Episcopal Conference of Costa Rica
4. Conference of Catholic Bishops of Cuba
5. Conference of the Dominican Episcopate (CED)
6. Episcopal Conference of El Salvador
7. Episcopal Conference of Guatemala
8. Episcopal Conference of Haiti
9. Episcopal Conference of Honduras
10. Conference of the Mexican Episcopate (CEM)
11. Episcopal Conference of Nicaragua
12. Episcopal Conference of Panama
13. Puerto Rican Episcopal Conference (CEP)
14. United States Conference of Catholic Bishops (USCCB) (Note: The United States Conference of Catholic Bishops also includes the bishop of the US Virgin Islands, but does not include the bishops of Puerto Rico (who form a separate conference), nor of the Northern Mariana Islands, American Samoa and Guam who are part of the Episcopal Conference of the Pacific.)

=== South America ===
1. Argentine Episcopal Conference (CEA)
2. Bolivian Episcopal Conference
3. National Conference of Bishops of Brazil (CNBB)
4. Episcopal Conference of Chile (CECh)
5. Episcopal Conference of Colombia
6. Ecuadorian Episcopal Conference
7. Paraguayan Episcopal Conference
8. Peruvian Episcopal Conference
9. Episcopal Conference of Uruguay
10. Venezuelan Episcopal Conference

=== Other episcopal bodies ===
In addition to the episcopal conferences as defined by the Holy See, there are a number of other regional groupings of bishops:

==== Synods of eastern rite churches ====
Synods of Bishops of the Patriarchal and Major Archiepiscopal Churches

- Synod of the Armenian Catholic Church
- Synod of the Chaldean Church
- Synod of the Catholic Coptic Church
- Synod of the Greek-Catholic Ukrainian Church
- Synod of the Greek-Melkite Catholic Church
- Synod of the Romanian Church
- Synod of the Syrian Catholic Church
- Synod of the Syro-Malabar Church
- Synod of the Syro-Malankara Church
- Council of the Ethiopian Church
- Council of the Ruthenian Church, U.S.A.
- Council of the Slovak Church

==== Assemblies of bishops ====
National assemblies of Hierarchs of Churches sui iuris (including eastern Catholic as well as Latin ordinaries):

- Assembly of the Catholic Hierarchy of Egypt
- Assembly of the Catholic Bishops of Iraq
- Assembly of the Patriarchs and Bishops of Lebanon
- Assembly of the Catholic Hierarchs of Syria
- Assembly of the Catholic Ordinaries of the Holy Land
- Iranian Episcopal Conference
- Catholic Bishops' Conference of India (CBCI)

==== International Meetings of Episcopal Conferences ====
- Council of Catholic Patriarchs of the East
- Symposium of Episcopal Conferences of Africa and Madagascar
- Regional Episcopal Conference of Francophone West Africa
- Association of Episcopal Conferences of Central Africa
- Association of Episcopal Conferences of the Region of Central Africa
- Association of Member Episcopal Conferences in Eastern Africa
- Inter-Regional Meeting of Bishops of Southern Africa
- Reunion of Episcopal Conferences of West Africa
- Federation of Asian Bishops' Conferences
- Federation of Catholic Bishops' Conferences of Oceania (FCBCO)
- Council of European Bishops' Conferences (CCEE)
- Commission of the Bishops' Conferences of the European Community (COMECE)
- Latin American Episcopal Council (CELAM)
- Episcopal Secretariate of Central America and Panama

== See also ==
- Catholic Church hierarchy
- Collegiality in the Catholic Church
- Episcopal see
- Roman Curia
- Dicastery
