= Episcopal Conference of Mali =

Assembly of Catholic bishops

The Episcopal Conference of Mali (French: Conférence Episcopal du Mali, EMC), established in 1970, is the episcopal conference of the Catholic Church in Mali..

The CEM is a member of the Regional Episcopal Conference of Francophone West Africa and Symposium of Episcopal Conferences of Africa and Madagascar (SECAM).

List of presidents of the Bishops' Conference:

1970-1987: Luc Sangaré Auguste, Archbishop of Bamako

1987-1996: Jean-Baptiste Marie Cisse, Bishop of Sikasso

1996-2009: Jean-Gabriel Diarra, Bishop of San

2009 by Jean-Baptiste Tiama, Bishop of Sikasso

== See also ==
- Catholic Church in Mali
