= Sophie Charlotte Ducker =

German-Australian botanist (1909–2004)

Sophie Charlotte Ducker AM
- Born: 9 April 1909; Berlin, Germany
- Died: 20 May 2004 (aged 95); Melbourne, Australia
- Education: University of Melbourne
- Spouse: Johann Friedrich Ducker (m. 1931 d. 1972)
- Children: 2
- Awards: Mueller Medal (1996)
- Scientific career
- Fields: Botany

Sophie Charlotte Ducker (née von Klemperer) AM (9 April 1909 – 20 May 2004) was a German-born Australian botanist. She was awarded the Mueller Medal in 1996.

== Early life and education ==
Sophie Charlotte von Klemperer was born in Berlin on 9 April 1909. She was the daughter of Victor von Klemperer, a Jewish German who converted to Christianity upon marriage, and his wife Sophie von Klemperer (née Reichenheim).

Sophie grew up in Dresden and later studied at the Cheltenham Ladies' College in England. She began the study of botany at the University of Geneva and the University of Stuttgart. She stopped her studies in 1931 when she married Dr Johann Friedrich Ducker, known as Friedrich. The couple’s only son, Klaus Heinrich Ducker, was born in Hamburg on 22 September 1933. Sophie also had a stepson, Hanfried Ducker, from her husband’s previous marriage.

The family faced persecution under the Third Reich due to Sophie’s Jewish heritage and their anti-Nazi sentiments. Friedrich Ducker was forced to resign from his employment after he refused to divorce his wife. The family left Germany at the outbreak of hostilities and moved to Tehran, Iran. They were unable to bring Hanfried as his passport was seized by Nazi authorities within days of the families’ departure.

On 17 September 1941, Friedrich Ducker was arrested by the British Military Authorities and interned as an enemy alien. Sophie petitioned to accompany her husband with their young son and was also arrested. The family were later brought to Australia where they were interned at Tatura in Victoria.

The family faced much persecution at the hands of the other German internees for their anti-Nazi sentiments. Cruel tricks were played on them and they were prevented from attending film nights. Young Klaus was so badly affected by the ill treatment that he was released from internment and sent to boarding school in Melbourne.

On 3 February 1944, Sophie gave birth to a stillborn daughter, Catherine Sophie Ducker, at Waranga Hospital in Goulburn. The baby was buried at Tatura Cemetery the following day and later moved to Tatura (German) Military Cemetery.

After recovering from the birth, Sophie returned to the camp where circumstances continued to deteriorate. The couple eventually successfully petitioned for their release and remained living in Australia.

== Career ==
Sophie worked as a research assistant for Ethel Irene McLennan of the botany school at the University of Melbourne. She completed a BSc there in 1952. In 1957, she became a botany lecturer at the university and, in 1961, a senior lecturer. She specialized in marine botany, especially algae. Her husband Friedrich died in Melbourne in 1972. Sophie retired in 1974 but continued to conduct research, present papers and lecture.

After her retirement, Sophie collaborated with Professor Bruce Knox at the University of Melbourne on pollination, particularly that of seagrasses. Sophie received a DSc from the University of Melbourne in 1978. She also published biographies of early Australian botanists. The standard author abbreviation Ducker is used to indicate this person as the author when citing a botanical name.

Sophie was a founding member of the Australasian Society for Phycology and Aquatic Botany.

== Awards ==
In 1993, Sophie was awarded an Honorary Doctor of Laws from the University of Melbourne. She received the Australian and New Zealand Association for the Advancement of Science's Mueller Medal in 1996. She was appointed Member of the Order of Australia (AM) in the 1997 Queen's Birthday Honours for "service to recording the history of botany in Australia, to education and to science, particularly in the field of marine botany".

== Death ==
Sophie died at her home in Melbourne at the age of 95. She was survived by her son Klaus, daughter-in-law Alison, two grandchildren and two great grandchildren.
