= Religion in Niger =

Religion in Niger (Pew Research Center 2020)
1. Islam (98.1%)
2. Other (1.90%)

According to the 2012 census, Islam is the most followed religion in Niger and is practiced by 99% of the population. According to Pew, roughly 80% of Muslims are Sunni of Maliki school of jurisprudence, whilst 20% are non-denominational Muslims. Other religions practiced in Niger include Animism and Christianity.

== Islam ==
Islam in Niger accounts for the vast majority of the nation's religious adherents. The faith is practiced by at least 95% of the population, although this figure varies by source and percentage of population who are classified as Animist. The official 2012 census found that 99.3% of the population self-identified as Muslim. The majority of the Muslim population identifies itself as Sunni Many of the communities who continue to practice elements of traditional religions do so within a framework of syncretic Islamic belief, making agreed statistics difficult. Islam in Niger, although dating back more than a millennium, gained dominance over traditional religions only in the 19th and early 20th centuries, and has been marked by influences from neighboring societies. Sufi brotherhoods have become the dominant Muslim organisation, like much of West Africa. Despite this, a variety of interpretations of Islam coexist—largely in peace—with one another as well as with minorities of other faiths. The government of Niger is secular in law while recognising the importance of Islam to the vast majority of its citizens.

== African Traditional Religion ==
A small percentage of the population practices Animism or traditional indigenous religious beliefs. Studies estimate that such practitioners number about 4.11% of the total population in 2020, such numbers can be misleading as there is a high rate of syncretism within Muslim communities throughout the country. However, syncretism has become less common over the past decade. The official 2012 census found that only 0.2% of the population (34,786 respondents) self-identified as Animist.

African Traditional Religion beliefs include both festivals and traditions (such as the Bori cult) practiced by some syncretic Muslim communities (in some Hausa areas as well as among some Toubou and Wodaabe pastoralists), as opposed to several small communities who maintain their pre-Islamic religion. These include the Hausa speaking Maouri (or Arna, the Hausa word for "pagan") community in Dogondoutci in the south-southwest and the Kanuri speaking Manga near Zinder, both of whom practice variations of the pre-Islamic Hausa Maguzawa religion. There are also some tiny Boudouma and Songhay African Traditional Religion communities in the southwest.

== Christianity ==
Christianity first contacted Niger with French colonial expansion, and its adherents include local believers from the educated, the elite, and colonial families, as well as immigrants from neighboring coastal countries, particularly Benin, Togo, and Ghana. Christians, both Roman Catholics and Protestants, account for less than 1% of the population. The official 2012 census found that 0.3% of the population (56,856 respondents) was Christian. A later estimate has Christians at 0.24%, evenly split between Catholics, Protestants and other denominations.

In 2007 Christians were mainly present in Maradi, Dogondoutchi, Niamey and other urban centers with expatriate populations.

The first Catholic mission was founded in 1931, while the first Protestant missionaries came to Zinder in 1924 and to Tibiri a few years later. In the late 1970s, there were some 12,000 Catholic and 3,000 Protestant converts in Niger, comprising the Christian population alongside foreigners.

In September 2025, twenty-two people were killed in western Niger during and after a baptism.

== Baháʼí Faith in Niger ==
The Baháʼí Faith in Niger began during a period of wide scale growth in the religion across Sub-Saharan Africa near the end of its colonial period. The first Baháʼís arrive in Niger in 1966 and the growth of the religion reached a point of electing its National Spiritual Assembly in 1975. Following a period of oppression, making the institutions of the religion illegal in the late 1970s and 80s, the National Assembly was re-elected starting in 1992. The Baháʼí community in Niger has grown mostly in the south-west of the country where they number about 5,600 (0.04% total population.)

== No religion ==
The 2012 census also found 0.1% of the population (23,048 respondents) declaring they had no religion.

== Legal status ==
The Constitution of Niger provides for freedom of religion, and the government generally respects this right in practice, as long as persons respect public order, social peace, and national unity.

== Interfaith relations ==
Niger has a history of good relations between the majority Muslim believers and the much smaller minority faiths. In 2008, the Roman Catholic Archbishop of Niamey Mgr Michel Cartatéguy was quoted in the press as saying that Niger is one of the "best examples" of cohabitation and cooperation between Christians and Muslims.

In January 2015 Muslim protestors burned churches and cars and attacked French-linked businesses across Niger on Saturday, in violent protests against the publication of a cartoon of Muhammad on the cover of Charlie Hebdo magazine.

== Freedom of religion ==
In 2023 the country was scored 2 out of 4 for religious freedom.

== See also ==
- Islam in Niger
- Christianity in Niger
- Roman Catholicism in Niger
- Baháʼí Faith in Niger
- Romani mythology
