= Episcopal Conference of Burkina Faso and Niger =

Assembly of Catholic bishops in West Africa

The Episcopal Conference of Burkina Faso and of Niger (French: Conférence Episcopal du Burkina-Niger, CEBN) is the episcopal conference of the Catholic Church in Burkina Faso and Niger. Its purposes are to coordinate and make dynamic pastoral activities of the Catholic Church in the nations of Burkina Faso and Niger for the good of the faithful (Article 1 of the Statutes), and encourage the sharing of resources and people for a common assumption evangelizing mission of the church in the two countries (Article 2).

To carry out these tasks, the Conference has adopted the following bodies: the Plenary Assembly, the Permanent Council of the Episcopal Council for Economic Affairs, the secretary general, and several smaller bodies such as commissions, secretariats and technical committees.

The CEBN is a member of the Regional Episcopal Conference of Francophone West Africa and Symposium of Episcopal Conferences of Africa and Madagascar (SECAM).

== Presidents of the Bishops' Conference ==
1970–1976: Paul Zoungrana, Cardinal, Archbishop of Ouagadougou

1976–1982: Dieudonné Yougbaré, Archbishop of Koupéla

1982–1988: Anselme Titianma Sanon, Archbishop of Bobo-Dioulasso

1988–1995: Jean-Marie Untaani Compaoré, Bishop of Fada N'gourma

1995–2001: Jean-Baptiste Somé, Bishop of Diebougou

2001–2007: Philippe Ouedraogo, Bishop of Ouahigouya

From 2007: Séraphin François Rouamba, Archbishop of Koupéla

== See also ==
- Catholic Church in Burkina Faso
- Catholic Church in Niger
