= Christianity in Niger =

Christianity in Niger was brought with French colonial institutions, and its adherents include local believers from the educated, the elite, and colonial families, as well as immigrants from neighboring coastal countries, particularly Benin, Togo, and Ghana.

== Demographics ==
A survey in 2020 showed that Christians make up 0.24% of the population, evenly split between Catholics, Protestants and other denominations.

In 2007, Christians were mainly present in the areas of Maradi, Dogondoutchi, Niamey and other urban centers with expatriate populations.

The first Catholic mission was founded in 1931, while the first Protestant missionaries came to Zinder in 1924 and to Tibiri a few years later. In the late 1970s there were some 12,000 Catholic and 3,000 Protestant converts in Niger, with the remaining Christian population made up of foreigners. A 2015 study estimates some 4,500 Christians came from a Muslim background residing in Niger.

== Persecution ==
In January 2015, churches and Christian-owned shops were targeted in protests over the publications of the Charlie Hebdo issue No. 1178 in France. The publication sparked riots in the Nigerien cities of Zinder, Maradi and Gouré, which resulted in attacks on churches, Christian-owned shops and a French cultural center. Muslim crowds demonstrating against Muhammad's depiction attacked and set alight French businesses and churches with incendiary devices in Niamey. According to President Mahamadou Issoufou, at least ten people were killed over two days of protests.

In 2023, the country was ranked as the 28th worst place in the world to be a Christian by Open Doors.

In September 2025, twenty-two people were killed in western Niger during and after a baptism.

== See also ==
- Religion in Niger
- Roman Catholicism in Niger
