= Baháʼí Faith in Niger =

The Baháʼí Faith in Niger began during a period of wide scale growth in the religion across Sub-Saharan Africa near the end of its colonial period. The first Baháʼís arrived in Niger in 1965 and the growth of the religion reached the point of the election of its National Spiritual Assembly in 1975. Following a period of oppression, making the institutions of the Baháʼí Faith illegal in the late 1970s and '80s, the National Assembly was re-elected starting in 1992. The Baháʼí community in Niger has grown mostly in the south-west of the country where they number in the low thousands. The Association of Religion Data Archives (relying on World Christian Encyclopedia) estimated some 5,600 Baháʼís in 2005.

== Early period ==
During the late colonial period of French West Africa the Baháʼí Faith entered the region in 1953. Wide scale growth in the religion across Sub-Saharan Africa was observed to begin in the 1950s and extend into the 1960s. There were over 1,000 Baháʼís across North-West Africa resulting in a regional National Spiritual Assembly including French West Africa in 1956. Following the death of Shoghi Effendi, the elected Universal House of Justice was head of the religion and began to re-organized the Baháʼí communities of Africa by splitting off national communities to form their own National Assemblies from 1967 through the 1990s. Following the independence of Niger in 1960, the first pioneers arrived in Niger in 1966. From January to March 1970 Hand of the Cause Rúhíyyih Khanum crossed Africa from east to west, visiting many country's communities including Niger, meeting with individuals and institutions both Baháʼí and civic.

== Development ==
The National Spiritual Assembly of Niger, splitting off from the North West African Assembly, was elected in 1975.

As part of a sweep across several Sub-Saharan countries, the Baháʼí Faith was banned in the 1970s in Burundi (1974), Mali (1976), Uganda (1977), Congo (1978) and Niger in 1978, during the government established by the military coup of Seyni Kountché.)

"This was principally the result of a campaign by a number of Arab countries. Since these countries were also by this time providers of development aid, this overt attack on the Baháʼís was supported by covert moves such as linking the aid money to a particular country to the action that it took against the Baháʼís. This was partially successful and a number of countries did ban the Baháʼís for a time. However, the Baháʼís were able to demonstrate to these governments that they were not agents of Zionism nor anti-Islamic and succeeded in having the ban reversed in all of these countries except Niger."

The Nigerien government made changes by instituting a multi-party democratic system called for by union and student demands. Following this there was a waning of military coup successor Col. Ali Saibou's power and widespread changes in laws. In 1991, all legal restrictions of the Baháʼí Faith had been ended. though political instability persisted. The National Spiritual Assembly was elected again at Niger's Baháʼí Convention in 1992.

== Modern community ==
Since its inception the religion has had involvement in socio-economic development beginning by giving greater freedom to women, promulgating the promotion of female education as a priority concern, and that involvement was given practical expression by creating schools, agricultural coops, and clinics. The religion entered a new phase of activity when a message of the Universal House of Justice dated 20 October 1983 was released. Baháʼís were urged to seek out ways, compatible with the Baháʼí teachings, in which they could become involved in the social and economic development of the communities in which they lived. Worldwide in 1979 there were 129 officially recognized Baháʼí socio-economic development projects. By 1987, the number of officially recognized development projects had increased to 1482. The Nigerian community has participated in literacy project initiatives.

=== Demographics ===
The Baháʼís of Niger number a few thousand and are located primarily in Niamey and on the west side of the Niger River bordering Burkina Faso. The Association of Religion Data Archives (relying on World Christian Encyclopedia) estimated some 5,600 Baháʼís in 2005.

== See also ==
- History of Niger
- Religion in Niger
