= Islam in Niger =

Islam in Niger accounts for the vast majority of the nation's religious adherents. The faith is practiced by more than 99.3% of the population, although this figure varies by source and percentage of the population who are classified as Animist. The vast majority of Muslims in Niger are Malikite Sunni. Many of the communities who continue to practice elements of traditional religions do so within a framework of syncretic Islamic belief, making agreed statistics difficult. Islam in Niger, although dating back more than a millennium, gained dominance over traditional religions only in the 19th and early 20th centuries, and has been marked by influences from neighboring societies. Sufi brotherhoods have become the dominant Muslim organization, like much of West Africa. Despite this, a variety of interpretations of Islam coexist—largely in peace—with one another as well as with minorities of other faiths. The government of Niger is secular in law while recognising the importance of Islam to the vast majority of its citizens.

== Demographics ==
Majority of Muslims are Sunni with many of those being linked to the Tijaniya Sufi brotherhoods. Approximately 7% are Shi'a and 6% Ahmadi. Hammallism and Sanusiya sects have had historic influence in the far west and far northeast of the county in the colonial period, while sections of Nyassist Sufi orders and Arab Wahhabite followers have appeared in the last thirty years.

== History ==
Islam was spread into what is now Niger beginning in the 15th century, by both the expansion of the Songhai Empire in the west, and the influence of the Trans-Saharan trade traveling from the Maghreb and Egypt. Tuareg expansion from the north, culminating in their seizure of the far eastern oases from the Kanem-Bornu Empire in the 17th centuries, spread distinctively Berber practices. Both Zarma and Hausa areas were greatly influenced by the 18th and 19th century Fula led Sufi brotherhoods, most notably the Sokoto Caliphate (in today's Nigeria).

The region around Say, on the Niger River was a center of Sufi religious instruction and Maliki legal interpretation, imported by Fulani clerics in the 1800s. While the Qadiriyyah Sufi orders were dominant in Northern and eastern Niger in the 19th century, as well as those areas under the sway of the Sokoto Caliphate, the first two decades of the 20th century saw the rise of the Tijaniya, especially in the west of the country. Militantly anti-colonial Hammallism spread from Mali in the northwest in the 1920s, while much of the Kaocen Revolt of Tuareg groups was inspired by Sanusiya sects in what is today Libya. More recently, Senegalese Nyassist Sufi teachers, especially in the Dosso area have gained converts, while some small Arab Wahhabite teaching is funded in Niger—as in much of Africa—through Saudi Arabian missionary groups.

== Contemporary Islam ==
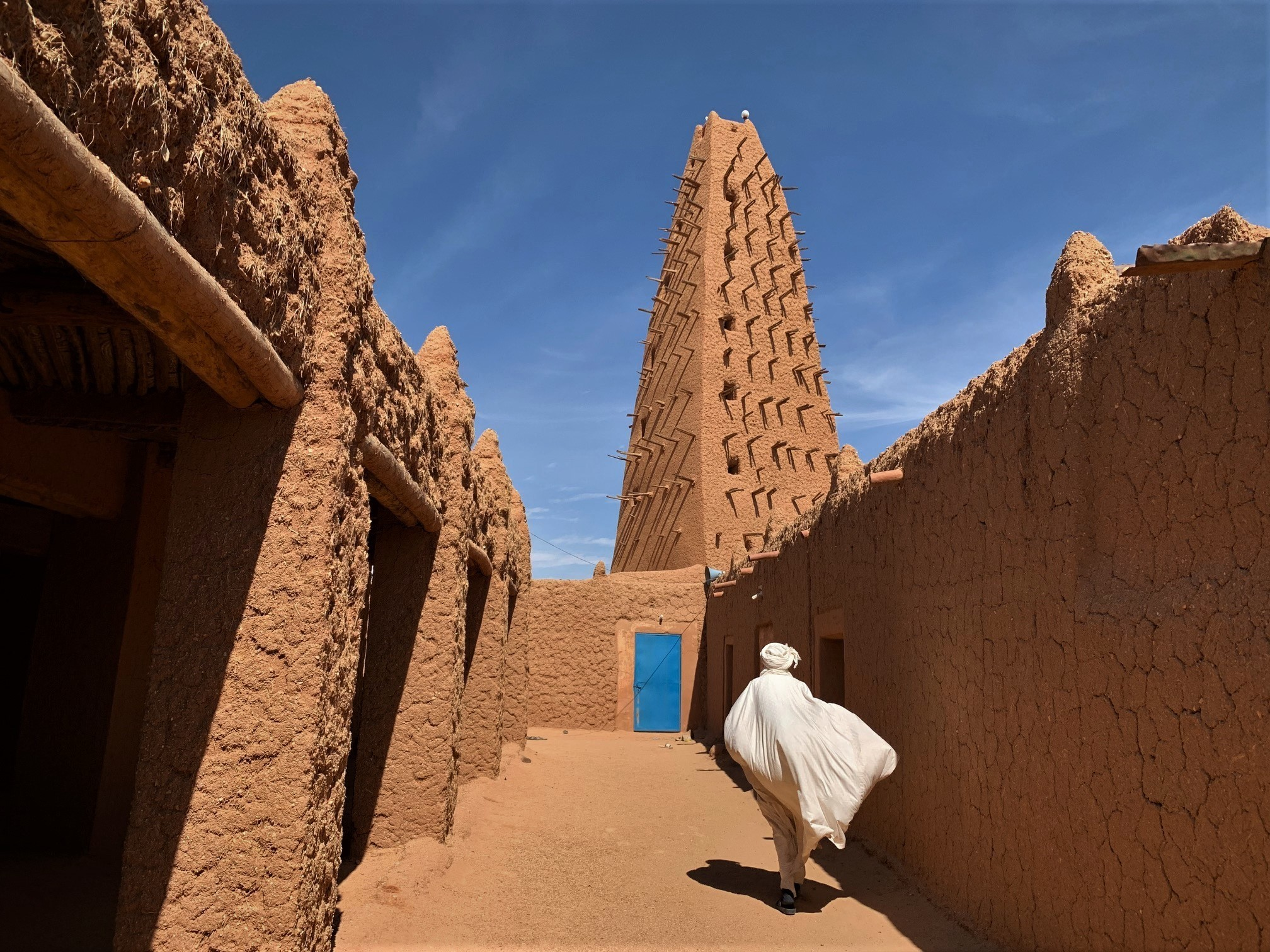
Agadez Mosque has been a place of worship for centuries

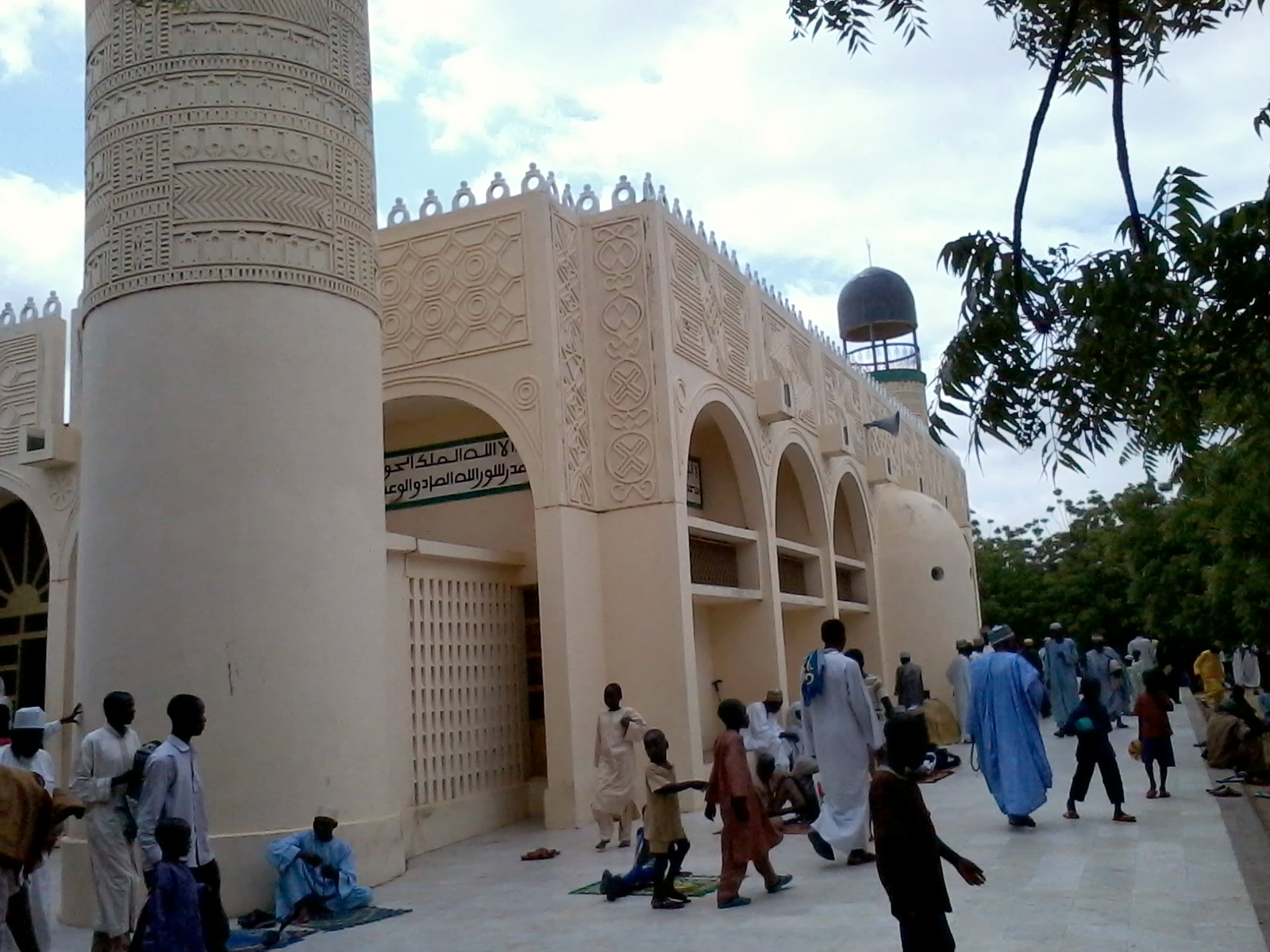
Tchana Mosque in Maradi

Grand Mosque of Niamey

=== Government support ===
The government does not directly fund religion and is legally separated from religious practice, but has funded several Muslim-oriented programs, such as a Muslim radio ministry and given US$18.5 Million in 1982 towards the establishment of the Islamic University of Niger in Say, itself founded and partially funded through donations from the Arab world.

The government has made three Muslim feasts national holidays, as well as two Christian holidays.

=== 1990s conflict ===
In the 1990s there surfaced agitation for a move to the institutionalization of a Sharia legal system or even an Islamic Republic, attributed to elements of the Hausa-based Islamist movements across the border in Nigeria. The Maradi-based Movement for Suppressing Innovations and Restoring Sunnah (IZALA), allegedly funded by clerics from Jos, Nigeria, pushed for greater adherence to their interpretation of Muslim law, and the conversion of those practicing other religions or holding Muslim interpretations inconsistent with these clerics. Tensions between these groups rose during the political instability marking the end of the Third Republic (1993–1996), attributed also to population movements of rural syncretic Muslims because of food shortages and political involvement of Nigerian groups and of the Niger military government who seized power between 1996 and 1999. Tensions culminated in a series of November 2000 riots surrounding a French run Niamey based fashion show which they deemed immoral. Violence in Niamey and Maradi, the center for most fundamentalist groups, spread to attacks on government, western, and Christian missionaries. The Nigerien government under both the Third Republic and (current) Fifth Republic has been swift and harsh in crackdowns on groups suspected of promoting religious intolerance, banning a number of religious groups and imprisoning leaders. Niger maintains its status as a secular state enshrined in the constitution of the Fifth Republic.

=== Tolerance ===
These events were seen then and now as more exception than rule, with interfaith relations deemed very good, and the forms of Islam traditionally practiced in most of the country marked by tolerance of other faiths and lack of restrictions on personal freedom. Divorce and Polygyny are unremarkable, women are not secluded, and head coverings are not mandatory—they are often a rarity in urban areas. Alcohol, such as the locally produced Bière Niger, is sold openly in most of the country.

== Syncretic beliefs ==
Despite a long history in what is today Niger, Islam did not become the dominant faith of many rural areas until the 20th century. The continuation of some elements of traditional beliefs continue both is small isolated pockets, and in practices of larger groups of nominal Muslim Nigeriens. Communities who continue to practice elements of traditional religions are often marked out as ethnic sub groups of the Songhay, the Kanouri (the Manga sub group), or Hausa (the Maouri/Azna/Mawri). The distinction between these groups and their Muslim neighbors is often a gradient. As well, elements of some Muslim communities continue to practice traditional spirit possession cults, active in the late 19th century. These include the "holey" cults of the Djerma and the Bori cult of the Hausa.

== Notable Nigerien Muslims ==
- Doundou Chefou, commander in Islamic State – Sahel Province

== See also ==
- Religion in Niger
