= Episcopal Conference of Equatorial Guinea =

Assembly of Catholic bishops

The Episcopal Conference of Equatorial Guinea (Spanish: Conferencia Episcopal de Guinea Ecuatorial, CEGE) is the episcopal conference of the Catholic Church in Equatorial Guinea.

The ECEG is a member of the Association des Conférences Episcopal de la Région de l'Afrique Central (ACERAC) and Symposium of Episcopal Conferences of Africa and Madagascar (SECAM).

List of presidents of the Bishops' Conference:

- 1983–1991: Rafael María Nze Abuy, Archbishop of Malabo
- 1992–2000: Anacleto Sima Ngua, Bishop of Bata
- 2000– ...: Ildefonso Obama Obono, Archbishop of Malabo
