= Episcopal Conference of the Ivory Coast =

Assembly of Catholic bishops

The Episcopal Conference of Côte d'Ivoire (French: Conférence Episcopal de Côte d'Ivoire, CECI) is the episcopal conference of the Catholic Church in Côte d'Ivoire. Founded in 1970, the Episcopal Conference has been officially recognized on February 16, 2007, by the Ivorian state. It includes all the Catholic bishops of the country, ordinary, and auxiliary emeritus. It has its headquarters in Abidjan.

The Episcopal Conference is composed of five organizations: the Plenary Assembly, the Permanent Council, the Presidency Council, the Council for Economic Affairs, the Secretary General. The Plenary Assembly is the supreme authority of the Conference of Bishops of the Ivory Coast, it brings together all the bishops twice a year. The Permanent Council is composed of the President and Vice President of CECI, the cardinals Ivorians, and the Ordinary of the place where the head office of the Conference. The Presidential Council is composed of Chairman, Vice Chairman and Secretary General of the CECI: it aims to prepare the meetings of the Permanent Council and the summary to be published.

The CECI is a member of the Association of Episcopal Conferences of Central Africa (ACEAC) and Symposium of Episcopal Conferences of Africa and Madagascar (SECAM).

== Presidents ==
1970–1993 - Bernard Yago, Cardinal, Archbishop of Abidjan

1993–1999: Auguste Nobou, Archbishop of Korhogo

1999–2005: Vital Komenan Yao, Archbishop of Bouaké

2005–2008: Laurent Akran Mandjo, bishop of Yopougon

2008–2011: Joseph Ake Yapo, Archbishop of Gagnoa

from 2011: Alexis Touably Youlo, bishop of Agboville

== See also ==
- Catholic Church in Ivory Coast
