= Episcopal Conference of Gabon =

Assembly of Catholic bishops

The Episcopal Conference of Gabon (French: Conférence Episcopal du Gabon, CEG) is the episcopal conference of the Catholic Church in Gabon. The ECG is a member of the Association of Episcopal Conferences of the Region of Central Africa and Symposium of Episcopal Conferences of Africa and Madagascar (SECAM).

List of presidents of the Bishops' Conference:

1970–1981: André Fernand Anguilé, Archbishop of Libreville

1981–1989: Félicien-Patrice Makouaka, Bishop of Franceville

1989–2005: Basile Mve Engone, Bishop of Oyem and Archbishop of Libreville

2005–... : Timothée Modibo-Nzockena, Bishop of Franceville

== See also ==
- Catholic Church in Gabon
