= Romano Pirola =

Romano Pirola OAM KSG
- Education: University of Sydney (MBBS); University of New South Wales (MD)
- Known for: Discovering pancreatic stellate cells
- Scientific career
- Fields: Pancreatology
- Thesis: The role of ethyl alcohol in pancreatic disease (1969)
- Doctoral students: Minoti Apte

Romano Cesare Pirola OAM KSG is an Australian pancreatology researcher and gastroenterologist. He is a co-founder of the Pancreatic Research Group at the University of South Wales, which is credited as the first research group to describe pancreatic stellate cells.

Pirola and his wife were both awarded the Medal of the Order of Australia in the 1997 Queen's Birthday Honours for "service to youth, particularly in establishing the Antioch Youth Movement".

== Most cited papers ==
- Haber PS, Keogh GW, Apte MV, Moran CS, Stewart NL, Crawford DH, Pirola RC, McCaughan GW, Ramm GA, Wilson JS. Activation of pancreatic stellate cells in human and experimental pancreatic fibrosis. The American journal of pathology. 1999 Oct 1;155(4):1087-95 .. Cited 471 times in Google Scholar
- Vonlaufen A, Joshi S, Qu C, Phillips PA, Xu Z, Parker NR, Toi CS, Pirola RC, Wilson JS, Goldstein D, Apte MV. Pancreatic stellate cells: partners in crime with pancreatic cancer cells. Cancer research. 2008 Apr 1;68(7):2085-93. DOI: 10.1158/0008-5472.CAN-07-2477 free from publisher Cited 447 times in Google Scholar
- Apte MV, Phillips PA, Fahmy RG, Darby SJ, Rodgers SC, McCaughan GW, Korsten MA, Pirola RC, Naidoo D, Wilson JS. Does alcohol directly stimulate pancreatic fibrogenesis? Studies with rat pancreatic stellate cells. Gastroenterology. 2000 Apr 1;118(4):780-94. Cited 342 times in Google Scholar
- Xu Z, Vonlaufen A, Phillips PA, Fiala-Beer E, Zhang X, Yang L, Biankin AV, Goldstein D, Pirola RC, Wilson JS, Apte MV. Role of pancreatic stellate cells in pancreatic cancer metastasis. The American journal of pathology. 2010 Nov 1;177(5):2585-96 X Cited 305 times in Google Scholar
