= Episcopal Conference of Chad =

Assembly of Catholic bishops in central Africa

The Episcopal Conference of Chad (French: Conference Episcopal du Tchad, CET) is the episcopal conference of the Catholic Church in Chad. The ECC is a member of the Association of Episcopal Conferences of the Central African Region and Symposium of Episcopal Conferences of Africa and Madagascar (SECAM).

List of presidents of the Bishops' Conference:

1970–1981: Paul-Pierre-Yves Dalmais, Archbishop of N'Djamena

1981–1983: Henri Véniat, Bishop of Sarh

1983–2002: Charles Louis Joseph Vandame, Archbishop of N'Djamena

Since 2002: Jean-Claude Bouchard, Bishop of Palambari

== See also ==
- Catholic Church in Chad
- Episcopal conference
