= Catholic Bishops' Conference of Ethiopia and Eritrea =

Episcopal conference of the Catholic Church in Ethiopia and Eritrea

The Catholic Bishops’ Conference Of Ethiopia And Eritrea, also known as the Episcopal Conference of Ethiopia And Eritrea, is an episcopal conference of the Catholic Church.

In Ethiopia there are two organizations of Bishops: the Bishops' Conference of Ethiopia and Eritrea (Ethiopian and Eritrean Episcopal Conference), which brings together the bishops of both countries regardless of their particular churches and liturgical rites, and Council of the Ethiopian Church (Ethiopian Council of the Church), which brings together the Catholic ordinaries of the Ethiopian rite of Ethiopia and Eritrea.

For both conferences, the current president is Archbishop of Addis Ababa, Berhaneyesus Demerew Souraphiel.
