= Episcopal Conference of Senegal, Mauritania, Cape Verde and Guinea-Bissau =

Assembly of Catholic bishops in West Africa

The Conference of Bishops of Senegal, Mauritania, Cape Verde, and Guinea Bissau (French: Conférence des Eveques du Sénégal, de la Mauritanie, du Cap-Vert et de Guinée-Bissau) is the episcopal conference of the Catholic Church in Senegal Mauritania, Cape Verde and Guinea Bissau. It is a member of the Episcopal Conférence Régionale de l'Afrique de l'Ouest Francophone (CERAO) Symposium of Episcopal Conferences of Africa and Madagascar (SECAM).

== Presidents ==
List of presidents of the Bishops' Conference:

1970–1987: Hyacinthe Thiandoum, archbishop of Dakar

1987–2005: Theodore-Adrien Sarr, Bishop of Kaolack and Archbishop of Dakar

Since 2005: Jean-Noël Diouf, Bishop of Tambacounda
