= Romanian Episcopal Conference =

Assembly of Catholic bishops

Logo of the Romanian Episcopal Conference

The Romanian Episcopal Conference (Romanian: Conferința Episcopală Română) is the permanent Catholic bishops' conference in Romania. The bishops' conference has its headquarters in Bucharest, is a member of the Council of European Episcopal Conferences (CCEE) and sends a representative to the Commission of the Bishops' Conferences of the European Community (COMECE).

The President of the Romanian Episcopal Conference is Bishop László Böcskei, head of the Roman Catholic Diocese of Oradea Mare.

Notable members are:

- Aurel Percă, Archbishop and Metropolitan of Bucharest;
- Gergely Kovács, Roman Catholic Archbishop of Alba Iulia.

The other bishops (diocesan bishops, auxiliary bishops and retired bishops) represent the Latin and Byzantine rites from Romania. The Roman Catholic bishop of Chișinău, as well as the apostolic nuncio for both Romania and Moldova are given each an honorary seat within the Conference.

== Chairman ==
- Áron Márton, Bishop of Alba Iulia (1970–1980)
- Cardinal Alexandru Todea, Archbishop of Făgăraș and Alba Iulia (1991–1994)
- Ioan Robu, Archbishop of Bucharest (1994–1998, 2001–2004, 2007–2010, 2013–2016)
- Lucian Mureşan, Major Archbishop of Alba Iulia (1998–2001, 2004–2007)
- Lucian Mureşan, Cardinal, Major Archbishop of Făgăraș and Alba Iulia (2010–2013, 2016–2019)
- Aurel Percă, Archbishop of Bucharest (2020–2025)

== See also ==
- Catholic Church in Romania
