= Catholic Bishops' Conference of Myanmar =

Assembly of Catholic bishops

The Catholic Bishops' Conference of Myanmar (CBCM), formerly the Catholic Bishops' Conference of Burma, is the episcopal conference of Myanmar (also called Burma).

== Composition ==
The Conference consists of various commissions, agencies, councils and other bodies. Day-to-day operations are overseen by a secretariat. The membership comprises bishops and auxiliary bishops of the 16 dioceses of Myanmar. As of 2020, the president of the CBCM is Cardinal Charles Maung Bo.

Following anti-Muslim violence in Meikhtila and Lashio in 2013, the CBCM issued a public statement in June 2013 urging the government to protect, promote and fulfill the religious rights of all, especially minority communities. The bishops’ conference declared the liturgical year from 24 November 2013 to the Solemnity of Christ the King on 23 November 2014 as the "500th Great Jubilee Year" of Catholicism in Myanmar.

President: Cardinal Charles Maung Bo, S.D.B. (60) (2020 - )

Past Prelates:

- President: Bishop Felix Lian Khen Thang (2014.07 - 2020)
- President: Bishop John Hsane Hgyi (2012–2014.07)
- President: Archbishop Paul Zingtung Grawng (2006 - 2012)
- President: Archbishop Victor Bazin, M.E.P. (1967 - 1969)
- President: Archbishop Gabriel Thohey Mahn-Gaby (1969 - 1976)
- President: Archbishop Alphonse U Than Aung (1976 - 1982)
- President: Bishop Paul Zingtung Grawng (later Archbishop) (1982 - 1992)
- President: Archbishop] Alphonse U Than Aung (1992 - 1994)
- President: Archbishop Matthias U Shwe (1994 - 2000)
- President: Archbishop Charles Maung Bo, S.D.B. (60) (2000 - 2006)

== See also ==
- Roman Catholicism in Burma
