= Ecuadorian Episcopal Conference =

Catholic bishops' conference for Ecuador

The Ecuadorian Episcopal Conference (Spanish: Conferencia Episcopal Ecuatoriana, or CEE) is a permanent institution that brings together the bishops of the Catholic Church in Ecuador to jointly exercise some of the pastoral functions that correspond to them throughout the South American nation.

== History ==
=== Background ===
By order of Pope Pius XII, the first meeting of the Episcopal Conference took place between November 6 to 11, 1939. Its first president was the then Archbishop of Quito, Monsignor Carlos María de la Torre, later the first Cardinal of Ecuador; he presided over the meeting until 1965. The Permanent Secretariat of the CEE was created in 1959. Initially, the CEE operated in the Archbishop's Curia of Quito (Plaza Grande).

== Ecuadorian Episcopate ==
The members of the Episcopal Conference are the diocesan bishops of Ecuador and those who are legally equivalent to them, as well as the coadjutor bishops, auxiliary bishops, and emeritus and titular bishops who, by appointment of the Holy See or the Episcopal Conference itself, fulfill a specific role in Ecuadorian territory.

== See also ==
- Catholic Church in Ecuador
