= Regional Episcopal Conference of Francophone West Africa =

Assembly of Catholic bishops

The Regional Episcopal Conference of Francophone West Africa (French: Episcopal Conférence Régionale de l'Afrique de l'Ouest Francophone, CERAO) is an agency of the Catholic Church which includes the bishops of Western Africa.

== History ==
The CERAO was created in 1963. Its first meeting was held in Anyama, near Abidjan in Ivory Coast, between 11 and 14 June. A second meeting was held the following year in Dakar, Senegal, from 3 to 6 June. It was created to facilitate the coordination of all activities involving the Catholic churches of the member countries and promote, as far as possible, a common pastoral plan. Its headquarters is in Abidjan, and statutes were approved during the meeting in Lomé, Togo, in February 1985.

== Organization ==
The CERAO consists of four main bodies: the Plenary Assembly, the Permanent Council, the General Secretariat, the Council of Presidents. The general assembly, which is the organ that takes all major decisions, meets every three years, otherwise the permanent council meets annually except in years that the general assembly meets. To better serve its objectives, the CERAO it has 13 committees and two secretariats. The committees are:

- catechesis
- liturgy
- theology
- the Bible
- the clergy and seminarians religious
- apostolate of the laity
- missions
- social action and charitable
- social media
- African Traditional Religion
- Islamic-Christian dialogue
- migrants
- tourism

The group's president, Cardinal CERAO of Dakar, Théodore-Adrien Sarr, has held that office since 2003.

== Members of CERAO ==
Part of CERAO Episcopal bishops of the following conferences:

- Bishops' Conference of Burkina-Niger (Episcopal Conférence du Burkina and Niger)
- Conference of Bishops of Senegal, Mauritania, Cape Verde and Guinea Bissau (Conférence des Bishop's du Sénégal, de la Mauritanie, du Cap-Vert et de Guinée-Bissau)
- Episcopal Conference of Benin (Catholic Bishops Conférence du Bénin)
- Episcopal Conference of Mali (Episcopal Conférence du Mali)
- Episcopal Conference of Togo (Episcopal Conférence du Togo)
- Episcopal Conference of Ivory Coast
- Episcopal Conference of Guinea (Episcopal Conference de la Guinée)

== Presidents ==
- Archbishop Robert Casimir Tonyui Messan Dosseh Anyron (1978–-1979)
- Cardinal Paul Zoungrana (1979–1983)
- Bishop Dieudonné Yougbaré (1983–1986)
- Bishop Bernard Agré (1986–1991)
- Bishop Anselme Sanon Titianma (1991–1998)
- Archbishop Isidore de Souza (1998–1999)
- vacant (1999–2003)
- Cardinal Theodore-Adrien Sarr (2003–)
