= Symposium of Episcopal Conferences of Africa and Madagascar =

Agency of the Catholic Church

The Symposium of Episcopal Conferences of Africa and Madagascar or SECAM (French: Symposium des Conférences Épiscopales d'Afrique et de Madagascar) is an agency of the Catholic Church that comprises the bishops of Africa.

== History ==
The SECAM was born, on the occasion of the Second Vatican Council, to express the will of the African bishops to speak and act together, overcoming the language difference, historical and cultural. The project, submitted to the Congregation for the Evangelization of Peoples, was approved in 1968. The Symposium was convened for the first time during the visit of Pope Paul VI to Uganda in 1969.

== Organization ==
SECAM includes a presidential council, a General Secretariat, and special committees: the committee on doctrinal and pastoral, social and legal committee, the Committee on Finance and Administration, the Committee for African Affairs, the union of African collaboration.

== Presidents ==
1. 1969 – Laurean Rugambwa
2. 1969–1978 – Paul Zoungrana
3. 1978–1981 – Hyacinthe Thiandoum
4. 1981–1984 – Paul Zoungrana
5. 1984–1987 – Joseph-Albert Malula
6. 1987–1990 – Gabriel Gonsum Ganaka
7. 1991–1994 – Christian Wiyghan Tumi
8. 1994–1997 – Gabriel Gonsum Ganaka
9. 1997–2003 – Laurent Monsengwo Pasinya
10. 2003–2007 – John Olorunfemi Onaiyekan
11. 2007–2013 – Polycarp Pengo
12. 2013–2019 – Gabriel Mbilingi
13. 2019–2023 – Philippe Nakellentuba Ouédraogo
14. 2023–present – Fridolin Ambongo Besungu

== Members ==
The regional episcopal conferences that are represented in SECAM are:

- Association of Episcopal Conferences of Central Africa (Association des Conférences Episcopal de l'Afrique Centrale, ACEAC)
- Association of Episcopal Conferences of Central Africa Region (Association des Conférences Episcopal de la Région de l'Afrique Central, ACERAC)
- Association of Episcopal Conferences of Anglophone West Africa (Association of Episcopal Conferences of Anglophone West Africa, AECAWA)
- Members of the Association of Episcopal Conferences of Eastern Africa (Association of Member Episcopal Conferences in Eastern Africa, AMECEA)
- Regional Episcopal Conference of West African francophone (Episcopal Conférence Régionale de l'Afrique de l'Ouest Francophone, CERAO)
- Interregional Meeting of Bishops of Southern Africa (Inter-Regional Meeting of Bishops of Southern Africa, IMBISA)
- The inter-regional or national conferences of bishops:
- Regional Bishops' Conference of North Africa (Regional Episcopal Conference de l'Afrique du Nord, CERNA)
- Conference of Catholic Bishops of Southern Africa (Southern African Catholic Bishops' Conference, "SACBC)
- Episcopal Conference of Angola and São Tomé (Conferencia Episcopal de Angola and São Tomé, CEAST)
- Episcopal Conference of Burkina-Niger (Episcopal Conférence du Burkina and Niger);
- Conference of Catholic Bishops of Burundi (Conférence des Bishop's catholiques du Burundi, CECA.B.)
- National Episcopal Conference of Cameroon (Episcopal Conférence Nationale du Cameroun, CENC):
- Central African Conference of Bishops (Episcopal Conference Centrafricaine, CZECH)
- Episcopal Conference of Chad, (Episcopal Conference du Tchad)
- Episcopal Conference of Congo (Episcopal Conférence du Congo)
- Episcopal Conference of Zaire (Episcopal Conférence du Zaire, CEZ)
- Episcopal Conference of Côte d'Ivoire (Episcopal Conference of Côte d'Ivoire)
- Episcopal Conference of Equatorial Guinea (Guinea Ecuatorial de Episcopal Conference)
- Episcopal Conference of Ethiopia (South African Episcopal Conference)
- Episcopal Conference of Gabon (Episcopal Conférence du Gabon)
- Inter-territorial Conference of Catholic Bishops of Gambia and Sierra Leone (Inter-Territorial Catholic Bishops' Conference of The Gambia and Sierra Leone, ITCABIC)
- Conference of Bishops of Ghana (Ghana Bishops' Conference)
- Episcopal Conference of Guinea (Episcopal Conference de la Guinée)
- Kenya Conference of Catholic Bishops (KCCB)
- Conference of Catholic Bishops of Lesotho (Lesotho Catholic Bishops' Conference)
- Episcopal Conference of Madagascar
- Episcopal Conference of Malawi (Episcopal Conference of Malawi)
- Episcopal Conference of Mali (Episcopal Conférence du Mali)
- Episcopal Conference of Mozambique (Conferencia Episcopal de Moçambique, CEM)
- Namibian Catholic Bishops' Conference (Namibian Catholic Bishops' Conference, NCBC)
- Catholic Bishops Conference of Nigeria (Catholic Bishops Conference of Nigeria)
- Conference of Catholic Bishops of Rwanda (Episcopal Conférence du Rwanda, C.Ep.R.)
- Conference of Bishops of Senegal, Mauritania, Cape Verde, and Guinea Bissau (Conférence des Bishop's du Sénégal, de la Mauritanie, du Cap-Vert et de Guinée-Bissau)
- Conference of Catholic Bishops of Sudan (Sudan Catholic Bishops' Conference, SCBC)
- Episcopal Conference of Tanzania (Tanzania Episcopal Conference, TEC)
- Episcopal Conference of Togo (Episcopal Conférence du Togo)
- Episcopal Conference of Uganda (Uganda Episcopal Conference, UEC)
- Zambia Conference of Catholic Bishops (ZCCB)
- Conference of Catholic Bishops of Zimbabwe (Zimbabwe Catholic Bishops' Conference, ZCBC)
- Episcopal Conference of the Indian Ocean (Conférence de l'Ocean Indien Episcopal, CEDOI)

== See also ==
- Catholic Church in Africa
- Catholic Church in Madagascar
