= List of Catholic dioceses in Myanmar =

The Roman Catholic Church in Burma is composed of three ecclesiastical provinces, each with an archdiocese headed by an archbishop, and a total of 14 dioceses headed by bishops.

== Episcopal Conference of Burma ==
=== Ecclesiastical Province of Mandalay ===
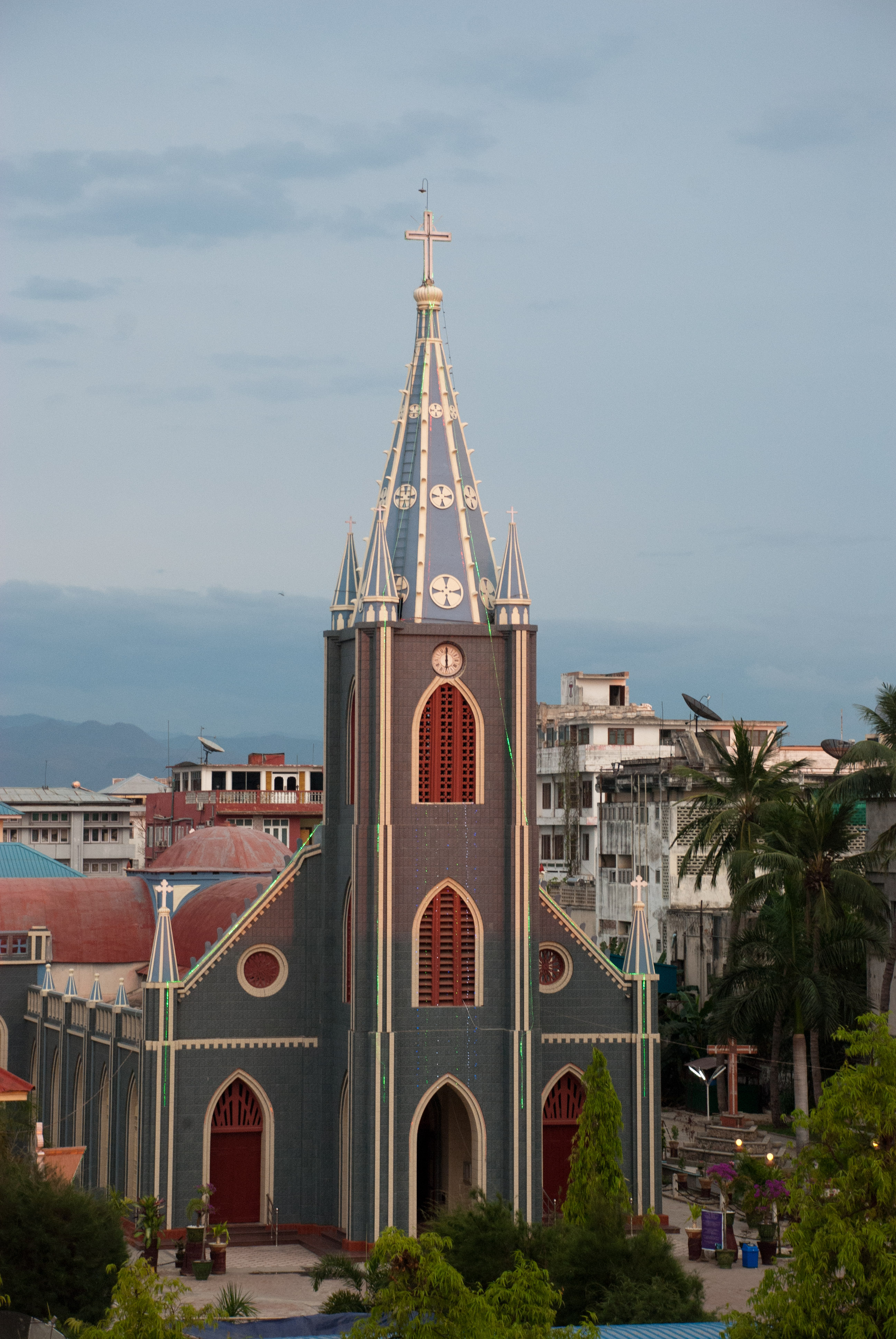
Sacred Heart Cathedral in Mandalay

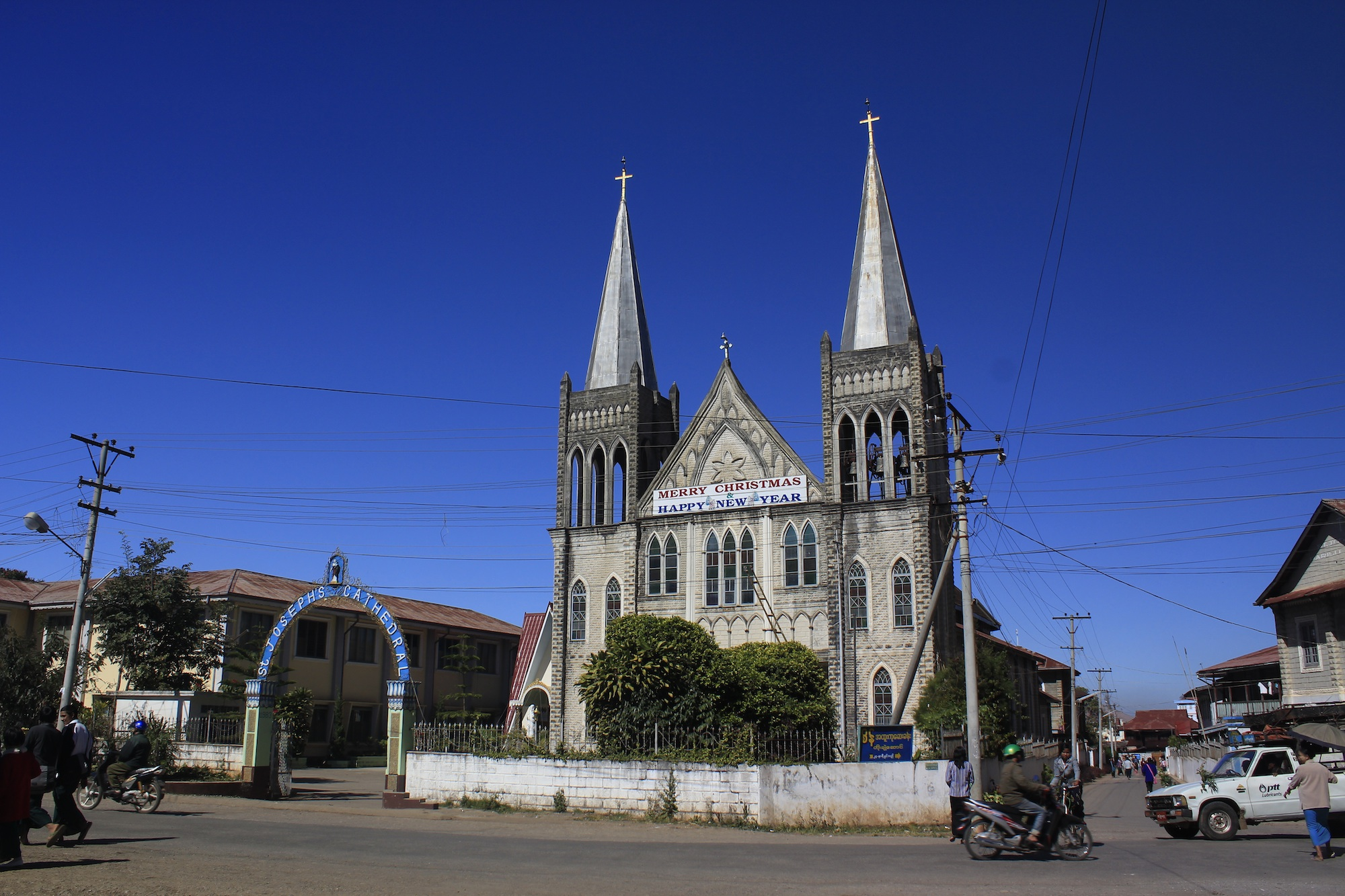
St. Joseph's Cathedral in Taunggyi

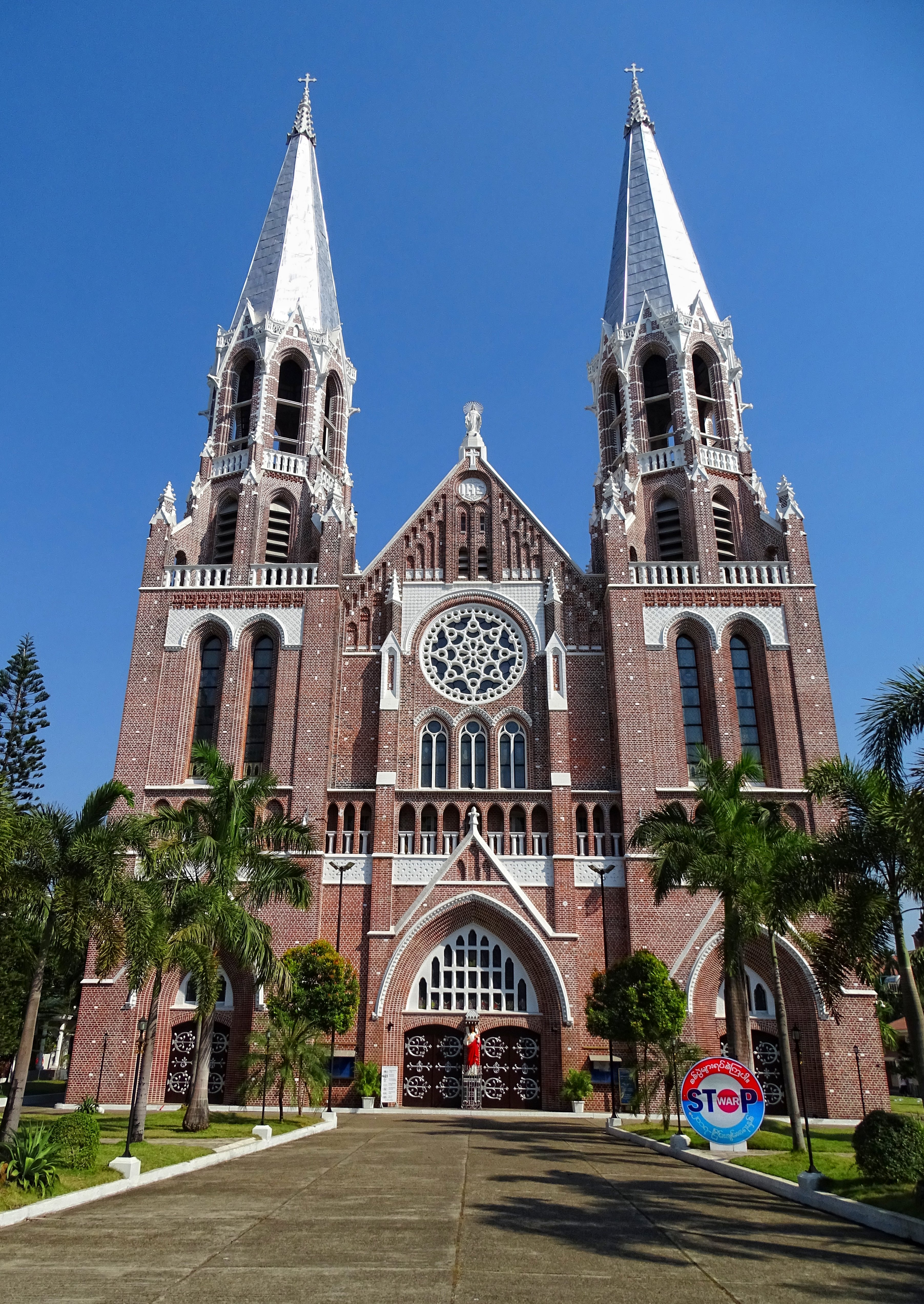
Saint Mary's Cathedral, Yangon

- Archdiocese of Mandalay
  - Diocese of Banmaw
  - Diocese of Hakha
  - Diocese of Kalay
  - Diocese of Lashio
  - Diocese of Myitkyina
  - Diocese of Mindat

=== Ecclesiastical Province of Taunggyi ===
- Archdiocese of Taunggyi
  - Diocese of Kengtung
  - Diocese of Loikaw
  - Diocese of Pekhon
  - Diocese of Taungngu

=== Ecclesiastical Province of Yangon ===
- Archdiocese of Yangon
  - Diocese of Hpa-an
  - Diocese of Mawlamyine
  - Diocese of Pathein
  - Diocese of Pyay

== See also ==
- Catholic Church in Myanmar
