= List of Catholic dioceses of Asia =

The Catholic Church in Asia has dioceses in most countries.

== List of Catholic dioceses in Asia ==
=== Episcopal Conference of Bangladesh ===
==== Ecclesiastical Province of Dhaka ====
- Archdiocese of Dhaka
  - Diocese of Chittagong
  - Diocese of Dinajpur
  - Diocese of Khulna
  - Diocese of Mymensingh
  - Diocese of Rajshahi
  - Diocese of Sylhet

=== Episcopal Conference of Brunei ===
==== Ecclesiastical Province of Brunei ====
- Brunei

=== Episcopal Conference of Cambodia ===
==== Ecclesiastical Province of Cambodia ====
- Apostolic Vicariate of Phnom Penh
- Apostolic Prefecture of Battambang
- Apostolic Prefecture of Kompong Cham

=== Episcopal Conference of China ===
==== Ecclesiastical Province of Anqing ====
- Archdiocese of Anqing 安慶 / Huaining 懷寧
  - Diocese of Bengbu 蚌埠
  - Diocese of Wuhu 蕪湖

==== Ecclesiastical Province of Beijing ====
- Archdiocese of Beijing 北京 / Peking
  - Diocese of Anguo 安國
  - Diocese of Baoding 保定
  - Diocese of Chengde 承德
  - Diocese of Daming 大名
  - Diocese of Jingxian 景縣
  - Diocese of Shunde 順德
  - Diocese of Tianjin 天津
  - Diocese of Xianxian 獻縣
  - Diocese of Xuanhua 宣化
  - Diocese of Yongnian 永年
  - Diocese of Yongping 永平
  - Diocese of Zhaoxian 趙縣
  - Diocese of Zhengding 正定

==== Ecclesiastical Province of Changsha ====
- Archdiocese of Changsha 長沙
  - Diocese of Changde 常德
  - Diocese of Hengzhou 衡州
  - Diocese of Yuanling 沅陵

==== Ecclesiastical Province of Chongqing ====
- Archdiocese of Chongqing 重慶 / Chungking
  - Diocese of Chengdu 成都
  - Diocese of Jiading 嘉定
  - Diocese of Kangding 康定
  - Diocese of Ningyuan 寧遠
  - Diocese of Shunqing 順慶
  - Diocese of Suifu 敘府
  - Diocese of Wanxian 萬縣

==== Ecclesiastical Province of Fuzhou ====
- Archdiocese of Fuzhou 福州 / Min-Hou / Minhou 閩侯 / Foochow
  - Diocese of Funing 福寧
  - Diocese of Tingzhou 汀州
  - Diocese of Xiamen 廈門

==== Ecclesiastical Province of Guangzhou ====
- Archdiocese of Guangzhou 廣州 / Canton
  - Diocese of Beihai 北海
  - Diocese of Jiangmen 江門
  - Diocese of Jiaying 嘉應
  - Diocese of Shantou 汕頭
  - Diocese of Shaozhou 韶州

==== Ecclesiastical Province of Guiyang ====
- Archdiocese of Guiyang 貴陽 / Kweyang
  - Diocese of Nanlong 南龍

==== Ecclesiastical Province of Hangzhou ====
- Archdiocese of Hangzhou 杭州 / Hangchow
  - Diocese of Lishui 麗水
  - Diocese of Ningbo 寧波
  - Diocese of Taizhou 台州
  - Diocese of Yongjia 永嘉

==== Ecclesiastical Province of Hankou ====
- Archdiocese of Hankou 漢口 / Hankow
  - Diocese of Hanyang 漢陽
  - Diocese of Laohekou 老河口
  - Diocese of Puqi 蒲圻
  - Diocese of Qizhou 蘄州
  - Diocese of Shinan 施南
  - Diocese of Wuchang 武昌
  - Diocese of Xiangyang 襄陽
  - Diocese of Yichang 宜昌

==== Ecclesiastical Province of Jinan ====
- Archdiocese of Jinan 濟南 / Tsinan
  - Diocese of Caozhou 曹州
  - Diocese of Qingdao 青島
  - Diocese of Yanggu 陽穀
  - Diocese of Yantai 煙台
  - Diocese of Yanzhou 兖州
  - Diocese of Yizhou 沂州
  - Diocese of Zhoucun 周村

==== Ecclesiastical Province of Kaifeng ====
- Archdiocese of Kaifeng 開封 / Kaifeng
  - Diocese of Guide 歸德
  - Diocese of Luoyang 洛陽
  - Diocese of Nanyang 南陽
  - Diocese of Weihui 衛輝
  - Diocese of Xinyang 信陽
  - Diocese of Zhengzhou 鄭州
  - Diocese of Zhumadian 駐馬店

==== Ecclesiastical Province of Kunming ====
- Archdiocese of Kunming 昆明 / Kunming
  - Diocese of Dali 大理

==== Ecclesiastical Province of Lanzhou ====
- Archdiocese of Lanzhou 蘭州 / Kao-Lan / Gaolan 皋蘭 / Lanchow
  - Diocese of Pingliang 平涼
  - Diocese of Qinzhou 秦州

==== Ecclesiastical Province of Nanchang ====
- Archdiocese of Nanchang 南昌
  - Diocese of Ganzhou 贛州
  - Diocese of Ji'an 吉安
  - Diocese of Nancheng 南城
  - Diocese of Yujiang 餘江

==== Ecclesiastical Province of Nanjing ====
- Archdiocese of Nanjing 南京 / Nanking
  - Diocese of Haimen 海門
  - Diocese of Shanghai 上海,
  - Diocese of Suzhou 蘇州
  - Diocese of Xuzhou 徐州

==== Ecclesiastical Province of Nanning ====
- Archdiocese of Nanning 南寧
  - Diocese of Wuzhou 梧州

==== Ecclesiastical Province of Shenyang ====
- Archdiocese of Shenyang 瀋陽 / Fengtian 奉天 / Fengtien / Mukden
  - Diocese of Chifeng 赤峰
  - Diocese of Fushun 撫順
  - Diocese of Jilin 吉林
  - Diocese of Rehe 熱河
  - Diocese of Sipingjie 四平街
  - Diocese of Yanji 延吉
  - Diocese of Yingkou 營口

==== Ecclesiastical Province of Suiyuan ====
- Archdiocese of Suiyuan 綏遠 / Suiyüan / Hohot 呼和浩特
  - Diocese of Jining 集寧
  - Diocese of Ningxia 寧夏
  - Diocese of Xiwanzi 西彎子

==== Ecclesiastical Province of Taiyuan ====
- Archdiocese of Taiyuan 太原 / Taiyüan
  - Diocese of Datong 大同
  - Diocese of Fenyang 汾陽
  - Diocese of Hongdong 洪洞
  - Diocese of Lu'an 潞安
  - Diocese of Shuozhou 朔州
  - Diocese of Yuci 榆次

==== Ecclesiastical Province of Xi'an ====
- Archdiocese of Xi'an 西安 / Chang-An / Chang’an 長安 / Sian
  - Diocese of Fengxiang 鳳翔
  - Diocese of Hanzhong 漢中
  - Diocese of Sanyuan 三原
  - Diocese of Yan'an 延安
  - Diocese of Zhouzhi 盩厔

=== Episcopal Conference of East Timor ===
- Archidiocese of Dili
  - Diocese of Baucau
  - Diocese of Maliana

=== Episcopal Conference of India ===
==== Ecclesiastical Province of Agra ====
- Archdiocese of Agra
  - Diocese of Ajmer
  - Diocese of Allahabad
  - Diocese of Bareilly
  - Diocese of Jaipur
  - Diocese of Jhansi
  - Diocese of Lucknow
  - Diocese of Meerut
  - Diocese of Udaipur
  - Diocese of Varanasi

==== Ecclesiastical Province of Bangalore ====
- Archdiocese of Bangalore
  - Diocese of Belgaum
  - Diocese of Bellary
  - Diocese of Chikmagalur
  - Diocese of Gulbarga
  - Diocese of Karwar
  - Diocese of Mangalore
  - Diocese of Mysore
  - Diocese of Shimoga
  - Diocese of Udupi

==== Ecclesiastical Province of Bhopal ====
- Archdiocese of Bhopal
  - Diocese of Gwalior
  - Diocese of Indore
  - Diocese of Jabalpur
  - Diocese of Jhabua
  - Diocese of Khandwa,

==== Ecclesiastical Province of Bombay ====
- Archdiocese of Bombay
  - Diocese of Nashik
  - Diocese of Poona
  - Diocese of Vasai

==== Ecclesiastical Province of Calcutta ====
- Archdiocese of Calcutta
  - Diocese of Asansol
  - Diocese of Bagdogra
  - Diocese of Baruipur
  - Diocese of Darjeeling
  - Diocese of Jalpaiguri
  - Diocese of Krishnagar
  - Diocese of Raiganj

==== Ecclesiastical Province of Cuttack-Bhubaneswar ====
- Archdiocese of Cuttack-Bhubaneswar
  - Diocese of Balasore
  - Diocese of Berhampur
  - Diocese of Rayagada
  - Diocese of Rourkela
  - Diocese of Sambalpur

==== Ecclesiastical Province of Delhi ====
- Archdiocese of Delhi
  - Diocese of Jammu-Srinagar
  - Diocese of Jalandhar
  - Diocese of Simla and Chandigarh

==== Ecclesiastical Province of Gandhinagar ====
- Archdiocese of Gandhinagar
  - Diocese of Ahmedabad
  - Diocese of Baroda

==== Ecclesiastical Province of Goa and Daman ====
- Archdiocese of Goa and Daman
  - Diocese of Sindhudurg

==== Ecclesiastical Province of Guwahati ====
- Archdiocese of Guwahati
  - Diocese of Bongaigaon
  - Diocese of Dibrugarh
  - Diocese of Diphu
  - Diocese of Itanagar
  - Diocese of Miao
  - Diocese of Tezpur

==== Ecclesiastical Province of Hyderabad ====
- Archdiocese of Hyderabad
  - Diocese of Cuddapah
  - Diocese of Khammam
  - Diocese of Kurnool
  - Diocese of Nalgonda
  - Diocese of Warangal

==== Ecclesiastical Province of Imphal ====
- Archdiocese of Imphal
  - Diocese of Kohima

==== Ecclesiastical Province of Madras and Mylapore ====
- Archdiocese of Madras and Mylapore
  - Diocese of Chingleput
  - Diocese of Coimbatore
  - Diocese of Ootacamund
  - Diocese of Vellore

==== Ecclesiastical Province of Madurai ====
- Archdiocese of Madurai
  - Diocese of Dindigul
  - Diocese of Kottar
  - Diocese of Kuzhithurai
  - Diocese of Palayamkottai
  - Diocese of Sivagangai
  - Diocese of Tiruchirapalli
  - Diocese of Tuticorin

==== Ecclesiastical Province of Nagpur ====
- Archdiocese of Nagpur
  - Diocese of Amravati
  - Diocese of Aurangabad

==== Ecclesiastical Province of Patna ====
- Archdiocese of Patna
  - Diocese of Bettiah
  - Diocese of Bhagalpur
  - Diocese of Buxar
  - Diocese of Muzaffarpur
  - Diocese of Purnea

==== Ecclesiastical Province of Pondicherry and Cuddalore ====
- Archdiocese of Pondicherry and Cuddalore
  - Diocese of Dharmapuri
  - Diocese of Kumbakonam
  - Diocese of Salem
  - Diocese of Tanjore

==== Ecclesiastical Province of Raipur ====
- Archdiocese of Raipur
  - Diocese of Ambikapur
  - Diocese of Jashpur
  - Diocese of Raigarh

==== Ecclesiastical Province of Ranchi ====
- Archdiocese of Ranchi
  - Diocese of Daltonganj
  - Diocese of Dumka
  - Diocese of Gumla
  - Diocese of Hazaribag
  - Diocese of Jamshedpur
  - Diocese of Khunti
  - Diocese of Port Blair
  - Diocese of Simdega

==== Ecclesiastical Province of Shillong ====
- Archdiocese of Shillong
  - Diocese of Agartala
  - Diocese of Aizawl
  - Diocese of Jowai
  - Diocese of Nongstoin
  - Diocese of Tura

==== Ecclesiastical Province of Thiruvananthapuram ====
- Archdiocese of Thiruvananthapuram
  - Diocese of Alleppey
  - Diocese of Neyyattinkara
  - Diocese of Punalur
  - Diocese of Quilon

==== Ecclesiastical Province of Verapoly ====
- Archdiocese or Verapoly
  - Diocese of Calicut
  - Diocese of Cochin
  - Diocese of Kannur
  - Diocese of Kottapuram
  - Diocese of Sultanpet
  - Diocese of Vijayapuram

==== Ecclesiastical Province of Visakhapatnam ====
- Archdiocese of Visakhapatnam
  - Diocese of Eluru
  - Diocese of Guntur
  - Diocese of Nellore
  - Diocese of Srikakulam
  - Diocese of Vijayawada

==== Ecclesiastical Province of Eranakulam - Angamaly ====
- Archdiocese of Eranakulam-Angamaly
  - Diocese of Idukki
  - Diocese of Kothamangalam

==== Ecclesiastical Province of Changanassery ====
- Archdiocese of Changanassery
  - Diocese of Kanjirappally
  - Diocese of Palai
  - Diocese of Thuckalay

==== Ecclesiastical Province of Faridabad ====
- Archdiocese of Faridabad
  - Diocese of Bijnor
  - Diocese of Gorakhpur

==== Ecclesiastical Province of Kalyan ====
- Archdiocese of Kalyan
  - Diocese of Chanda
  - Diocese of Rajkot

==== Ecclesiastical Province of Shamshabad ====
- Archdiocese of Shamshabad
  - Diocese of Adilabad

==== Ecclesiastical Province of Tellicherry ====
- Archdiocese of Tellicherry
  - Diocese of Belthangady
  - Diocese of Bhadravathi
  - Diocese of Mananthavady
  - Diocese of Thamarassery
  - Diocese of Mandya

==== Ecclesiastical Province of Thrissur ====
- Archdiocese of Thrissur
  - Diocese of Hosur
  - Diocese of Irinjalakuda
  - Diocese of Palghat
  - Diocese of Ramanathapuram

==== Ecclesiastical Province of Ujjain ====
- Archdiocese of Ujjain
  - Diocese of Jagdalpur
  - Diocese of Sagar
  - Diocese of Satna

==== Ecclesiastical Province of Kottayam ====
- Archdiocese of Kottayam

==== Ecclesiastical Province of Trivandrum ====
- Archdiocese of Trivandrum
  - Diocese of Khadki
  - Diocese of Marthandom
  - Diocese of Mavelikara
  - Diocese of Parassala
  - Diocese of Pathanamthitta

==== Ecclesiastical Province of Tiruvalla ====
- Archdiocese of Tiruvalla
  - Diocese of Muvattupuzha
  - Diocese of Bathery
  - Diocese of Puthur

==== Directly under the Holy See ====
- Diocese of Gurgaon

=== Episcopal Conference of Indonesia ===
==== Ecclesiastical Province of Ende ====
- Archdiocese of Ende
  - Diocese of Denpasar
  - Diocese of Larantuka
  - Diocese of Maumere
  - Diocese of Ruteng

==== Ecclesiastical Province of Djakarta ====
- Archdiocese of Jakarta
  - Diocese of Bandung
  - Diocese of Bogor

==== Ecclesiastical Province of Kupang ====
- Archdiocese of Kupang
  - Diocese of Atambua
  - Diocese of Weetebula

==== Ecclesiastical Province of Makassar ====
- Archdiocese of Makassar
  - Diocese of Amboina
  - Diocese of Manado

==== Ecclesiastical Province of Medan ====
- Archdiocese of Medan
  - Diocese of Padang
  - Diocese of Sibolga

==== Ecclesiastical Province of Merauke ====
- Archdiocese of Merauke
  - Diocese of Agats
  - Diocese of Jayapura
  - Diocese of Manokwari-Sorong
  - Diocese of Timika

==== Ecclesiastical Province of Palembang ====
- Archdiocese of Palembang
  - Diocese of Pangkal-Pinang
  - Diocese of Tanjungkarang

==== Ecclesiastical Province of Pontianak ====
- Archdiocese of Pontianak
  - Diocese of Ketapang
  - Diocese of Sanggau
  - Diocese of Sintang

==== Ecclesiastical Province of Samarinda ====
- Archdiocese of Samarinda
  - Diocese of Banjarmasin
  - Diocese of Palangkaraya
  - Diocese of Tanjung Selor

==== Ecclesiastical Province of Semarang ====
- Archdiocese of Semarang
  - Diocese of Malang
  - Diocese of Purwokerto
  - Diocese of Surabaya
- Military Ordinariate of Indonesia

=== Episcopal Conference of Japan ===
==== Ecclesiastical Province of Nagasaki ====
- Archdiocese of Nagasaki 長崎
  - Diocese of Fukuoka 福岡
  - Diocese of Kagoshima 鹿児島
  - Diocese of Naha 那覇
  - Diocese of Oita 大分

==== Ecclesiastical Province of Osaka ====
- Archdiocese of Osaka-Takamatsu 大阪高松
  - Diocese of Hiroshima 広島
  - Diocese of Kyoto 京都
  - Diocese of Nagoya 名古屋

==== Ecclesiastical Province of Tokyo ====
- Archdiocese of Tokyo 東京
  - Diocese of Niigata 新潟
  - Diocese of Saitama さいたま
  - Diocese of Sapporo 札幌
  - Diocese of Sendai 仙台
  - Diocese of Yokohama 横浜

=== Episcopal Conference of Korea ===
==== Ecclesiastical Province of Kwanju ====
- Archdiocese of Kwangju 광주
  - Diocese of Cheju 제주
  - Diocese of Chŏnju 전주 / Jeonju

==== Ecclesiastical Province of Seoul ====
- Archdiocese of Seoul 서울
  - Diocese of Ch’unch’on 춘천
  - Diocese of Taejŏn 대전 / Daejeon
  - Diocese of Hamhung 함흥
  - Diocese of Incheon 인천
  - Diocese of Pyongyang 평양
  - Diocese of Suwon 수원
  - Diocese of Uijeongbu 의정부
  - Diocese of Wonju 원주

==== Ecclesiastical Province of Taegu ====
- Archdiocese of Taegu 대구 / Daegu
  - Diocese of Andong 안동
  - Diocese of Cheongju 청주
  - Diocese of Masan 마산
  - Diocese of Pusan 부산

=== Episcopal Conference of Laos ===
- Apostolic Vicariate of Luang Prabang
- Apostolic Vicariate of Paksé
- Apostolic Vicariate of Savannakhet
- Apostolic Vicariate of Vientiane

=== Episcopal Conference of Malaysia ===
==== Ecclesiastical Province of Kuala Lumpur ====
- Archdiocese of Kuala Lumpur
  - Diocese of Melaka-Johor
  - Diocese of Penang

==== Ecclesiastical Province of Kuching ====
- Archdiocese of Kuching
  - Diocese of Miri
  - Diocese of Sibu

==== Ecclesiastical Province of Kota Kinabalu ====
- Archdiocese of Kota Kinabalu
  - Diocese of Keningau
  - Diocese of Sandakan

=== Episcopal Conference of Mongolia ===
==== Ecclesiastical Province of Mongolia ====
- Prefecture Apostolic of Ulaanbaatar

=== Episcopal Conference of Myanmar ===
==== Ecclesiastical Province of Mandalay ====
- Archdiocese of Mandalay
  - Diocese of Banmaw
  - Diocese of Hakha
  - Diocese of Kalay
  - Diocese of Lashio
  - Diocese of Myitkyina

==== Ecclesiastical Province of Taunggyi ====
- Archdiocese of Taunggyi
  - Diocese of Kengtung
  - Diocese of Loikaw
  - Diocese of Pekhon
  - Diocese of Taungngu

==== Ecclesiastical Province of Yangon ====
- Archdiocese of Yangon
  - Diocese of Mawlamyine
  - Diocese of Pathein
  - Diocese of Pyay

=== Episcopal Conference of Nepal ===
==== Ecclesiastical Province of Nepal ====
- Apostolic Vicariate of Nepal

=== Episcopal Conference of Pakistan ===
==== Ecclesiastical Province of Karachi ====
- Archdiocese of Karachi
  - Diocese of Hyderabad

==== Ecclesiastical Province of Lahore ====
- Archdiocese of Lahore
  - Diocese of Rawalpindi
  - Diocese of Multan
  - Diocese of Faisalabad

=== Episcopal Conference of the Philippines ===
==== Ecclesiastical Province of Caceres ====
- Archdiocese of Caceres
  - Diocese of Daet
  - Diocese of Legazpi
  - Diocese of Masbate
  - Diocese of Sorsogon
  - Diocese of Virac
  - Prelature of Libamanan

==== Ecclesiastical Province of Cagayan de Oro ====
- Archdiocese of Cagayan de Oro
  - Diocese of Butuan
  - Diocese of Malaybalay
  - Diocese of Surigao
  - Diocese of Tandag

==== Ecclesiastical Province of Capiz ====
- Archdiocese of Capiz
  - Diocese of Kalibo
  - Diocese of Romblon

==== Ecclesiastical Province of Cebu ====
- Archdiocese of Cebu
  - Diocese of Dumaguete
  - Diocese of Maasin
  - Diocese of Tagbilaran
  - Diocese of Talibon

==== Ecclesiastical Province of Cotabato ====
- Archdiocese of Cotabato
  - Diocese of Kidapawan
  - Diocese of Marbel

==== Ecclesiastical Province of Davao ====
- Archdiocese of Davao
  - Diocese of Digos
  - Diocese of Mati
  - Diocese of Tagum

==== Ecclesiastical Province of Jaro ====
- Archdiocese of Jaro
  - Diocese of Bacolod
  - Diocese of Kabankalan
  - Diocese of San Carlos
  - Diocese of San Jose de Antique

==== Ecclesiastical Province of Lingayan-Dagupan ====
- Archdiocese of Lingayen-Dagupan
  - Diocese of Alaminos
  - Diocese of Cabanatuan
  - Diocese of San Fernando de La Union
  - Diocese of San Jose
  - Diocese of Urdaneta

==== Ecclesiastical Province of Lipa ====
- Archdiocese of Lipa
  - Diocese of Boac
  - Diocese of Gumaca
  - Diocese of Lucena
  - Prelature of Infanta

==== Ecclesiastical Province of Manila ====
- Archdiocese of Manila
  - Diocese of Antipolo
  - Diocese of Cubao
  - Diocese of Imus
  - Diocese of Kalookan
  - Diocese of Malolos
  - Diocese of Novaliches
  - Diocese of Parañaque
  - Diocese of Pasig
  - Diocese of San Pablo

==== Ecclesiastical Province of Nueva Segovia ====
- Archdiocese of Nueva Segovia
  - Diocese of Baguio
  - Diocese of Bangued
  - Diocese of Laoag
  - Territorial Prelature of Batanes

==== Ecclesiastical Province of Ozamis ====
- Archdiocese of Ozamis
  - Diocese of Dipolog
  - Diocese of Iligan
  - Diocese of Pagadian
  - Prelature of Marawi

==== Ecclesiastical Province of Palo ====
- Archdiocese of Palo
  - Diocese of Borongan
  - Diocese of Calbayog
  - Diocese of Catarman
  - Diocese of Naval

==== Ecclesiastical Province of San Fernando ====
- Archdiocese of San Fernando
  - Diocese of Balanga
  - Diocese of Iba
  - Diocese of Tarlac

==== Ecclesiastical Province of Tuguegarao ====
- Archdiocese of Tuguegarao
  - Diocese of Bayombong
  - Diocese of Ilagan

==== Ecclesiastical Province of Zamboanga ====
- Archdiocese of Zamboanga
  - Prelature of Ipil
  - Prelature of Isabela

==== Apostolic Vicariates ====
- Vicariate of Bontoc-Lagawe
- Vicariate of Calapan
- Vicariate of Jolo
- Vicariate of Puerto Princesa
- Vicariate of San Jose in Mindoro
- Vicariate of Tabuk
- Vicariate of Taytay

==== Military Ordinariate ====
- Military Ordinariate of the Philippines

=== Episcopal Conference of Singapore ===
==== Ecclesiastical Province of Singapore ====
- Archdiocese of Singapore

=== Episcopal Conference of Sri Lanka ===
==== Ecclesiastical Province of Colombo ====
- Archdiocese of Colombo
  - Diocese of Anuradhapura
  - Diocese of Badulla
  - Diocese of Chilaw
  - Diocese of Galle
  - Diocese of Jaffna
  - Diocese of Kandy
  - Diocese of Kurunegala
  - Diocese of Mannar
  - Diocese of Ratnapura
  - Diocese of Trincomalee-Batticaloa

=== Episcopal Conference of Taiwan ===
==== Ecclesiastical Province of Taipei ====
- Archdiocese of Taipei 臺北
  - Diocese of Hsinchu 新竹
  - Diocese of Hwalien 花連
  - Diocese of Kaohsiung 高雄
  - Diocese of Kiayi 嘉義
  - Diocese of Taichung 臺中
  - Diocese of Tainan 臺南

=== Episcopal Conference of Thailand ===
==== Ecclesiastical Province of Bangkok ====
- Archdiocese of Bangkok อัครสังฆมณฑลกรุงเทพฯ
  - Diocese of Chanthaburi สังฆมณฑลจันทบุรี
  - Diocese of Chiang Mai สังฆมณฑลเชียงใหม่
  - Diocese of Nakhon Sawan สังฆมณฑลนครสวรรค์
  - Diocese of Ratchaburi สังฆมณฑลราชบุรี
  - Diocese of Surat Thani สังฆมณฑลสุราษฎร์ธานี

==== Ecclesiastical Province of Thare and Nonseng ====
- Archdiocese of Thare and Nonseng อัครสังฆมณฑลท่าแร่-หนองแสง
  - Diocese of Nakhon Ratchasima สังฆมณฑลนครราชสีมา
  - Diocese of Ubon Ratchathani สังฆมณฑลอุบลราชธานี
  - Diocese of Udon Thani สังฆมณฑลอุดรธานี

=== Episcopal Conference of Turkey ===
==== Ecclesiastical Province of İzmir ====
- Archdiocese of İzmir
- Apostolic Vicariate of Anatolia
- Apostolic Vicariate of Istanbul

=== Episcopal Conference of Vietnam ===
==== Ecclesiastical Province of Hanoi ====
- Archdiocese of Hanoi
  - Diocese of Bắc Ninh
  - Diocese of Bùi Chu
  - Diocese of Hà Tĩnh
  - Diocese of Hai Phòng
  - Diocese of Hưng Hóa
  - Diocese of Lạng Sơn and Cao Bằng
  - Diocese of Phát Diêm
  - Diocese of Thái Bình
  - Diocese of Thanh Hóa
  - Diocese of Vinh

==== Ecclesiastical Province of Huế ====
- Archdiocese of Huế
  - Diocese of Ban Mê Thuôt
  - Diocese of Đà Nẵng
  - Diocese of Kontum
  - Diocese of Nha Trang
  - Diocese of Quy Nhơn

==== Ecclesiastical Province of Ho Chi Minh City ====
- Archdiocese of Ho Chi Minh City
  - Diocese of Bà Rịa
  - Diocese of Cần Thơ
  - Diocese of Đà Lạt
  - Diocese of Long Xuyên
  - Diocese of Mỹ Tho
  - Diocese of Phan Thiết
  - Diocese of Phú Cường
  - Diocese of Vĩnh Long
  - Diocese of Xuân Lôc.

== Resources ==
- The Catholic Church in Asia by GCatholic.org ^{[self-published]}
- Catholic-hierarchy.org ^{[self-published]}
