= Diocese of Myitkyina =

Diocese of Myitkyina may refer to:

- the Catholic Diocese of Myitkyina of the Catholic Church in Myanmar
- the Anglican Diocese of Myitkyina of the Church of the Province of Myanmar
