= Charles Maung Bo =

Burmese Catholic prelate

His Eminence Charles Maung Bo S.D.B
- Cardinal; Archbishop of Yangon
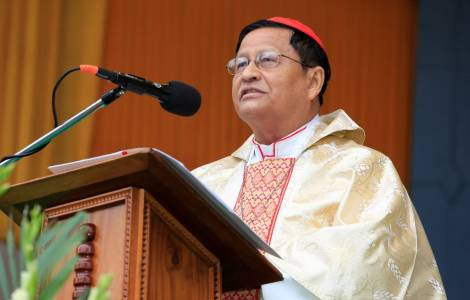
- Cardinal Bo in India.
- Native name: ချားလ်မောင်ဘို
- Church: Roman Catholic Church
- Archdiocese: Yangon
- See: Yangon
- Appointed: 15 May 2003
- Installed: 7 June 2003
- Predecessor: Gabriel Thohey Mahn-Gaby
- Previous post: Bishop of Pathein (1996–2003)

Orders
- Ordination: 9 April 1976
- Consecration: 16 December 1990 by Alphonse U Than Aung
- Created cardinal: 14 February 2015 by Pope Francis

Personal details
- Born: Charles Maung Bo; 29 October 1948 (age 78) Monhla Village, Shwebo District, Sagaing Region, Myanmar
- Residence: Yangon, Myanmar
- Parents: John Bo; Juliana Aye Tin
- Education: Nazareth Aspirantate
- Motto: Omnia possum in eo ('I can do all things in Him', Philippians 4:13)

Styles of Charles Maung Bo
- Reference style: His Eminence
- Spoken style: Your Eminence
- Religious style: Cardinal
- Informal style: Cardinal

Ordination history of Charles Maung Bo
History
Priestly ordination
- Date: 9 April 1976
Episcopal consecration
- Principal consecrator: Alphonse U Than Aung
- Co-consecrators: Abraham Tran; Paul Zingtung Grawng
- Date: 16 December 1990
Cardinalate
- Elevated by: Pope Francis
- Date: 14 February 2015
Episcopal succession
Bishops consecrated by Charles Maung Bo as principal consecrator
- Lucius Hre Kung: 2 February 2014
- John Saw Yaw Han: 12 April 2015

Charles Maung Bo (Burmese: ချားလ်မောင်ဘို, [t͡ɕʰál màʊɴ bò]; born 29 October 1948) is a Burmese Catholic prelate who has served as Archbishop of Yangon since 7 June 2003. He was created a cardinal by Pope Francis in 2015.

== Early life and education ==
Bo was born on 29 October 1948, in Monhla Village, Shwebo District, Sagaing Region, Myanmar to parents John and Juliana Aye Tin. Bo was baptized with the name Charles, as St. Charles Borromeo is his patron saint. Bo's father, a farmer, died when he was two. Thereafter, his local parish priest, Don Luwi, taught him the catechism between the ages of five and seven. He was sent to a Salesian-run boarding school in Mandalay, learning philosophy and theology from Father Giacomin Fortuanto. From 1962 to 1976, Bo studied at the Nazareth Aspirantate, a Salesian seminary, in Anisakan village, near Maymyo (now Pyin Oo Lwin).

== Career ==
Bo was ordained a priest of the Salesians of Don Bosco order on 9 April 1976. He was appointed prefect of the Roman Catholic Diocese of Lashio in 1986. Four years later, he was consecrated as the first Bishop of Lashio, preaching homilies in the local Kachin dialect, Maru. Bo also founded a new religious order, the Congregation of St. Paul's Brothers and Sisters, in 1990, dedicated to having "one vision of sharing the Good News of Jesus Christ with those who have not heard of him." In 1996, he was transferred to the Diocese of Pathein. On 17 March 2001, Pope John Paul II named him a member of the Pontifical Council for Interreligious Dialogue.

On 24 May 2003, Pope John Paul II named Bo Archbishop of Yangon. On 17 January 2009, Pope Benedict XVI named him a member of the Pontifical Council for Culture.

On 4 January 2015, Pope Francis announced that he would make Bo a cardinal on 14 February of the same year. At that ceremony, he was assigned the titular church of Sant’Ireneo a Centocelle.

In April 2015 Pope Francis named him a member of the Congregation for Institutes of Consecrated Life and Societies of Apostolic Life and the Pontifical Council for Culture, and in July 2016 a member of the Secretariat for Communications.

In July 2018, Francis named him a delegate to the Synod of Bishops on youth, faith, and vocational discernment.

He was elected to a three-year term as head of the Federation of Asian Bishops' Conferences (FABC) in the fall of 2018.

He participated as a cardinal elector in the 2025 papal conclave that elected Pope Leo XIV.

== Views ==
Bo maintained a close relationship with both Pope Benedict XVI and Pope Francis. In particular, Bo endorsed Francis' Synod on Synodality, describing it as "a long march of hope for all humanity," and that the synod had "energized us to return to the great days of evangelization by the Apostles." Bo also concurred with Francis' calls for a more merciful emphasis and a renewed focus on the effects of climate change, noting that climate change is "an atom bomb waiting to explode" that has "devastated communities and the livelihoods of millions, threatening to slip away from the next generation."

Bo has been strongly critical of the Chinese Communist Party, accusing it of negligence under the COVID-19 pandemic and ongoing human rights abuses, but refrained from overtly criticizing the 2018 Vatican-China Accords, which allowed the pope to appoint and veto bishops approved by the CCP.

He has been an active voice for the promotion of inter-faith dialogue and religious freedom, as well as the need to combat hate speech and the incitement of violence. In particular, Bo has spoken out on the need to protect the human rights of the Rohingya people, noting that "the plight of the Rohingyas is an appalling scar on the conscience of my country. They are among the most marginalized, dehumanized, and persecuted people in the world."

== See also ==
- Cardinals created by Pope Francis

Catholic Church titles
Preceded by John Jocelyn Madden, SDB	Bishop of Lashio; 1986–1996	Succeeded by Philip Lasap Za Hawng
Preceded by John Gabriel	Bishop of Pathein; 1996–2003	Succeeded by John Hsane Hgyi
Preceded by Gabriel Thohey Mahn-Gaby	Archbishop of Yangon; 2003 – present	Incumbent
Preceded by titular church established	Cardinal Priest of Sant’Ireneo a Centocelle	Incumbent
