= Diocese of Taungngu =

Diocese of Taungngu or of Toungoo may refer to:

- the Catholic Diocese of Taungngu of the Catholic Church in Myanmar
- the Anglican Diocese of Toungoo of the Church of the Province of Myanmar
