= Joseph Mahn Erie =

Burmese Roman Catholic bishop

Joseph Mahn Erie (18 March 1925 – 25 October 2017) was a Roman Catholic bishop.

Ordained to the priesthood in 1951, Mahn Erie served as bishop of the Roman Catholic Diocese of Bassein, Myanmar, from 1968 until 1982.

== See also ==
- Catholic Church in Burma
