= Mignani =

Mignani is an Italian surname. Notable people with the surname include:

- Gaetano Mignani (1882–1973), Italian Roman Catholic missionary
- Michele Mignani (born 1972), Italian footballer and manager
