= Holy See–Myanmar relations =

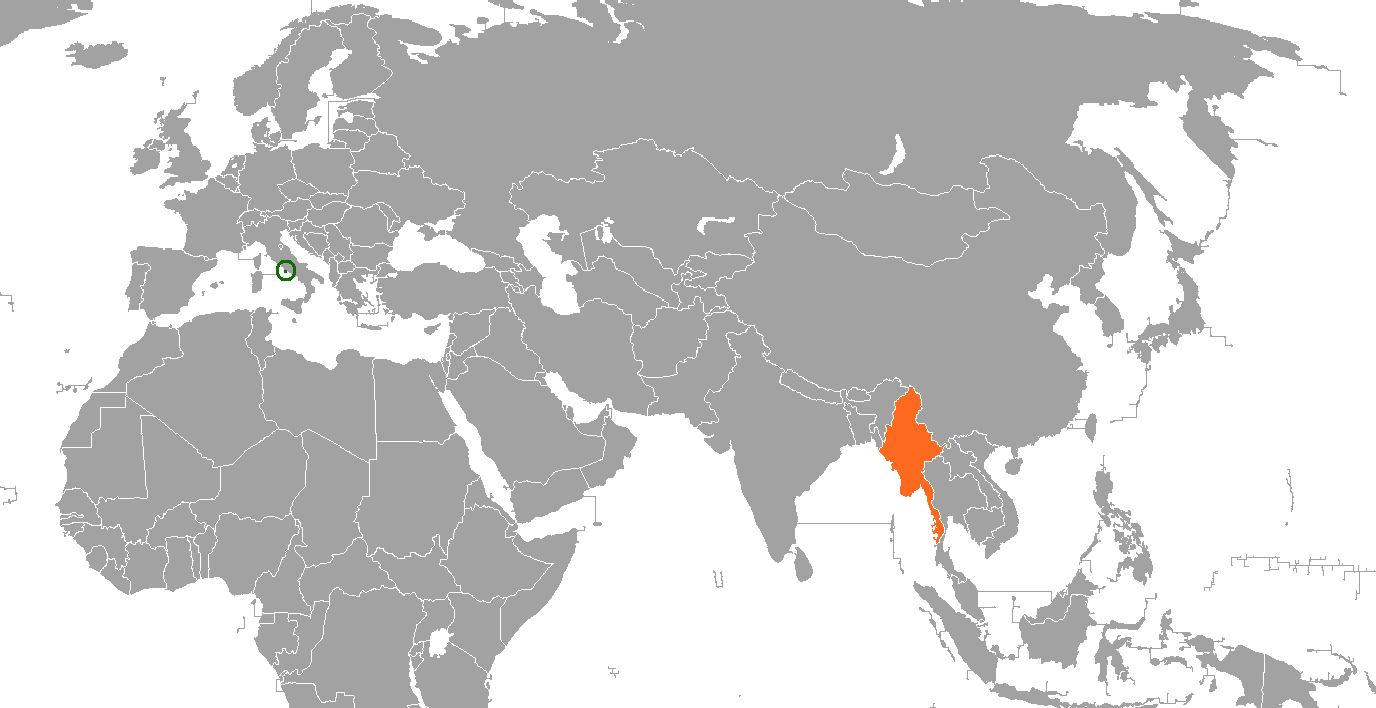
- Holy See: Myanmar

Holy See–Myanmar relations refers to bilateral relations between the Holy See, which is sovereign over the Vatican City, and Myanmar, also known as Burma. As of August 2017, Archbishop Paul Tschang In-Nam is the first Apostolic Nuncio to Myanmar, while San Lwin is Myanmar's ambassador to the Holy See.

== History ==
From 1990 to 2017, the Holy See had Apostolic Delegates who were representatives of the Holy See to the Catholics of Myanmar, but not formal representatives to the government. In March 2017 the Parliament of Myanmar approved a proposal by the Holy See in February of the same year to establish diplomatic relations. Myanmar and the Holy See announced in May 2017 that they will establish formal diplomatic relations. The announcement was made after a meeting between Pope Francis and Aung San Suu Kyi at the Vatican. This was the second visit of the Myanmar leader to Pope Francis, after her first one in 2013. Myanmar thus became the 183rd country to establish diplomatic relations with the Holy See.

== Papal visit ==
Pope Francis became the first pontiff to visit Myanmar in November 2017, after being personally invited by Myanmar President Htin Kyaw.

== See also ==
- Catholic Church in Myanmar
- Foreign relations of the Holy See
- Foreign relations of Myanmar
