= Marco Tin Win =

- Archbishop
- Church: Catholic
- Archdiocese: Mandalay
- Appointed: 25 April 2019
- Installed: 23 June 2019

Orders
- Ordination: 22 September 1987
- Consecration: 23 June 2019

Personal details
- Born: 22 April 1960 (age 66) Mon Hla, Shwebo, Myanmar
- Education: Pontifical Urban University
- Motto: Totus tuus

Marco Tin Win (born 22 April 1960) is a Myanmar-born prelate of the Catholic Church who was appointed Archbishop of Mandalay in April 2019.

== Biography ==
Marco Tin Win was born in Mon Hla in the district of Shwebo, Myanmar, on 22 April 1960. (Note: The Vatican announcement of his appointment as archbishop included his year of birth but did not specify the date as it customarily does.) He studied philosophy and theology at Saint Joseph’s Major Seminary in Yangon. He was ordained a priest on 22 September 1987. He earned a doctorate in philosophy from the Pontifical Urban University, Rome.

He has held a number of pastoral and administrative roles, including diocesan director for interreligious dialogue, rector of the Saint Thomas Preparatory Seminary of Mandalay, diocesan bursar, parish priest of the parish of Mary Help of Christians in Sagaing, and executive secretary of the Episcopal Conference of Yangon. He also held administrative positions with the Episcopal Conference of Burma. He has also worked to establish good relationships with other religious groups, including Muslims, Buddhists, and Hindus. He was secretary of the Office of Inter-Religious Dialogue of the Episcopal Conference as well.

He was vicar general, rector of the Cathedral of Mandalay, and a lecturer in philosophy at Saint Joseph’s Major Seminary in Pyin Oo Lwin when Pope Francis, on 25 April 2019, named him Archbishop of Mandalay.

== See also ==
- Catholic Church in Myanmar
