= Francis Daw Tang =

Catholic bishop

Francis Daw Tang (born December 19, 1949, in Bum Dum village) is the current Bishop of the Catholic Diocese of Myitkyina, in Kachin State, Myanmar.

Since 2003, Daw Tang, an ethnic Kachin, has been the primary clergyman in Myitkyina, overseeing more than 40 priests and often making executive decisions on a variety of projects currently undertaken by the Roman Catholic Church in the highly under-developed region of northern Burma.

During his time as bishop, Daw Tang has frequently petitioned government, military and paramilitary organizations to resolve conflicts and push towards a meaningful peace process in order to mitigate death and displacement. (see Views)

Like many Catholic clergy in Kachin State, Daw Tang is trilingual. He is also chairman of the Episcopal Commission for Laity and a member of Philosophate of Episcopal Commission for Seminaries.

== Early life ==
Daw Tang, like many elder Catholic clergy in Kachin State, was initially baptized by an Irish Columban missionary priest.

Two weeks before turning 30 years old, Daw Tang was ordained deacon on Dec. 4, 1979 in St. Joseph Catholic Major Seminary, Yangon. Earlier that year, he was ordained a priest on March 25 by Bishop Paul Zinghtung Grawng, the first ethnic Kachin to enter priesthood in the history of Catholicism.

From 1979 onwards, Daw Tang served at Nangling parish for a total of 14 years, before eventually filling a challenging role as parish priest in Hpakant, Myanmar.

Daw Tang remained in Hpakant for a total of nine years, from 1993 to 2002, before he was episcopally ordained as Auxiliary Bishop of Myitkyina. It was this year where he truly became entrenched with his duties as Bishop, but it wasn't until 2004 that he was officially ordained as Bishop.

On Dec. 3, 2004, Pope John Paul II appointed Daw Tang Bishop of Myitkyina.

== Views ==
Known as a "well-respected" and apolitical figure in Kachin State's Catholic community, Daw Tang has occasionally appeared in media reports, urging deeply divided ethnic separatists to engage in meaningful peace discussions with the Tatmadaw, Myanmar's national military.

"...return to the peace negotiation, since peace is possible. Peace is the only way, knowing that five decades of war has yielded nothing but more hatred, more agony," Daw Tang said at an event in 2013.

Daw Tang has called for "true federalism" in the face of increased displacement of Kachin people since military squadrons began engaging armed separatists in 2011.

“As a church we walk with our displaced people, watch their life being destroyed by war, their families fragmented by depressing life in the displaced camps.”

Like many of his fellow clergy, Daw Tang has publicly expressed a deep concern for the use of heavy weaponry and aerial bombing being used by the National military, which he called "unequal warfare waged during holy days of our faith."

In 2015, he urged faithful Catholic priests, nuns and laypeople to be involved in peace protest, "not only with our prayers but also taking part in demonstrations."
