= St. Joseph's Cathedral, Taunggyi =

Catholic Cathedral in Shan State, Myanmar

Coordinates: 20°46′47.9″N 97°02′19.7″E

St. Joseph's Cathedral
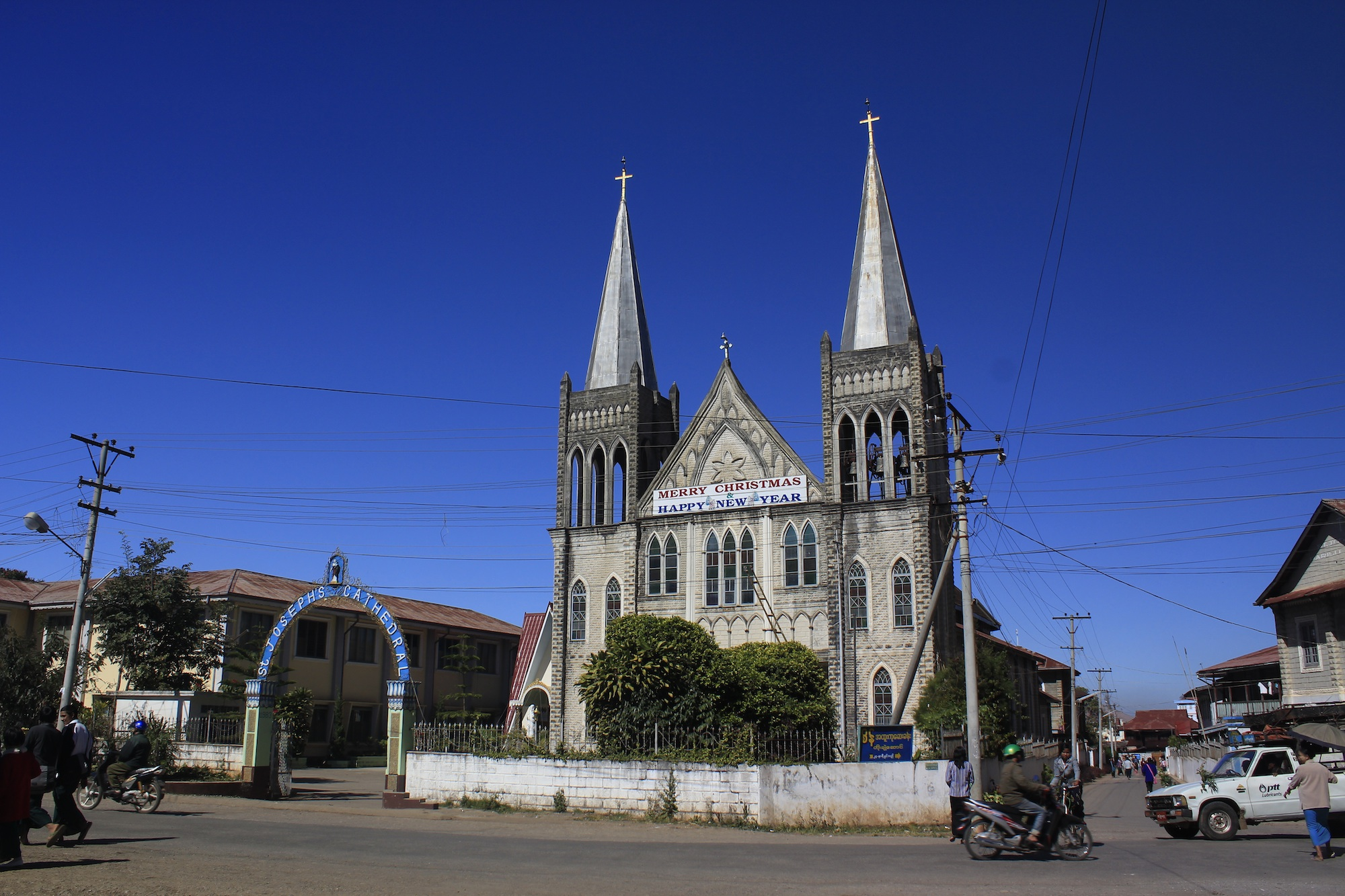
- St. Joseph's Cathedral
- Location: Taunggyi
- Country: Myanmar
- Denomination: Roman Catholic Church

St. Joseph's Cathedral, also known simply as the Taunggyi Cathedral, is the seat of the Roman Catholic Archdiocese of Taunggyi, in the Shan State of Myanmar. The cathedral church is located on 82nd Street between 25th & 26th Streets in Taunggyi.

It was established as the Parish of St. Joseph in 1873, and rebuilt in 1951. It was elevated to cathedral status upon the erection of the Diocese of Taunggyi in 1961, and remained cathedral when Pope John Paul II created Taunggyi as a metropolitan archdiocese in 1998 through the bull Ipso optime. Cathedral has undergone several renovations and restorations.

It is under the pastoral responsibility of Bishop Basilio Athai.

== See also ==
- Catholic Church in Myanmar
