= Nova Barbara =

Roman–Berber town in Numidia

Nova Barbara (Latin: Novabarbarensis) was a Roman–Berber town in the province of Numidia. It has been tentatively identified with the stone ruins at Beni-Barbar or Henchir-Barbar, Algeria. The Beni-Barbar tribe take its name from this location, though it has been several centuries since it lived there. It was also the seat of an ancient Catholic diocese.

The ancient bishopric is now a titular see of Nova Barbara in the ecclesiastical province of Numidia. The only known ancient bishop from Novabarbara was Adeodato, who participated in the synod meeting in Carthage in 484 called by the Vandal king Huneric. Huneric was an Arian Christian and as part of his program to remove Catholic influence in his newly established domains he had Adeodato later exiled.

Today Nova Barbara survives as titular bishopric, and the current titular bishop is Toshihiro Sakai, auxiliar bishop of Osaka, Japan.

== Known bishops ==
- Titular bishop: Toshihiro Sakai (2018.06.01 – present)
- Titular bishop: Alberto Vera Aréjula, O. de M. (2015.03.30 – 2018.04.25)
- Titular bishop: Stephen Tjephe (2009.06.19 – 2014.11.15)
- Titular bishop: Guillermo Rodrigo Teodoro Ortiz Mondragón (2000.01.29 – 2005.10.19)
- Titular bishop: (Archbishop) Jorge Ferreira da Costa Ortiga (1987.11.09 – 1999.06.05)
- Titular bishop: Basil Christopher Butler, O.S.B. (1966.11.29 – 1986.09.21)
- Adeodato † (mentioned in 484)
