= Joseph Devellerez Thaung Shwe =

- Bishop of Pyay
- Church: Catholic Church
- Diocese: Diocese of Pyay
- In office: 2 October 1975 – 3 December 2010
- Predecessor: Thomas Albert Newman
- Successor: Alexander Pyone Cho

Orders
- Ordination: 11 January 1961
- Consecration: 2 February 1976 by Edward Cassidy

Personal details
- Born: 10 October 1935 Twante Township, Lower Burma, Burma Province, British Raj, British Empire
- Died: 17 February 2015 (aged 79)

Joseph Devellerez Thaung Shwe (10 October 1935 – 17 February 2015) was a Burmese Roman Catholic bishop. Born in Twante and ordained to the priesthood in 1961, Devellerez Thaung Shwe was named bishop of Roman Catholic Diocese of Pyay, Burma in 1975, retired in 2010 and died in 2015.
