= Lucius Hre Kung =

Burmese Roman Catholic bishop (born 1959)

Lucius Hre Kun
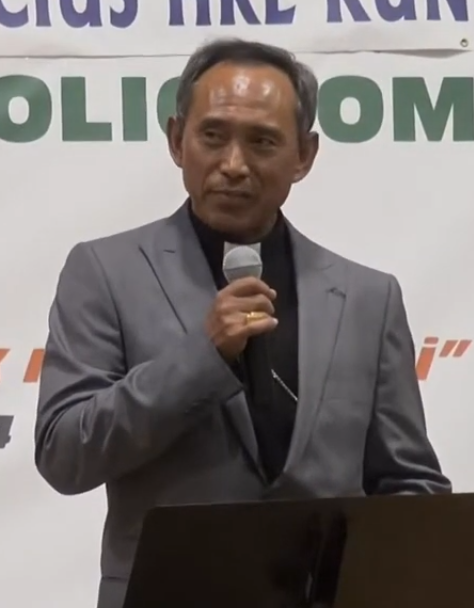
- Bishop Lucius Hre Kung in 2014
- Church: Catholic Church
- Diocese: Diocese of Pyay
- In office: 19 October 2013 – present

Personal details
- Born: 4 February 1959 Hnaring, Chin State, Burma

Lucius Hre Kung (born 4 February 1959 in Hnaring) is a Burmese Roman Catholic bishop.

Ordained to the priesthood in 1989, Hre Kung was named bishop of Roman Catholic Diocese of Hakha on 19 October 2013.
