= Diocese of Pekhon =

Latin Catholic diocese in Myanmar

Coordinates: 19°51′49.8″N 97°00′25.4″E

Diocese of Pekhon Dioecesis Pekhonensis

Location
- Country: Myanmar
- Ecclesiastical province: Taunggyi
- Metropolitan: Taunggyi

Statistics
- Area: 25,890 km^{2} (10,000 sq mi)
- Population: Total; Catholics: (as of 2020); 387,550; 57,724 (17.2%)
- Parishes: 16

Information
- Denomination: Catholic
- Sui iuris church: Latin Church
- Rite: Roman Rite
- Established: 15 December 2005
- Cathedral: Sacred Heart Cathedral in Pekhon

Current leadership
- Pope: Leo XIV
- Bishop: Felice Ba Htoo
- Metropolitan Archbishop: Basilio Athai
- Bishops emeritus: Peter Hla

The Diocese of Pekhon (Dioecesis Pekhonensis) is a Latin Catholic diocese of the Catholic Church in Myanmar, located in the Pekhon, Shan State. It is a suffragan diocese of the Archdiocese of Taunggyi.

The diocese was created on December 15, 2005, by splitting off the territory from the Archdiocese of Taunggyi. Peter Hla, who was previously auxiliary bishop of Taunggyi, was selected as its first bishop. Msgr. Felice Bahtoo was selected and consecrated Coadjutor Bishop of Pekhon diocese on 29th June, 2024.The cathedral of the diocese is the church of Sacred Heart in Pekhon.

The diocese covers an area of 25,890 km^{2} (10,000 sq mi), and borders the archdiocese of Taunggyi to the north, the Diocese of Taungngu to the southwest and the Diocese of Loikaw to the south.
