= Stephen Tjephe =

Burmese bishop (1955–2020)

- Bishop of Loikaw
- Church: Catholic Church
- Diocese: Diocese of Loikaw
- In office: 15 November 2014 – 16 December 2020
- Predecessor: Sotero Phamo
- Successor: Celso Ba Shwe
- Previous posts: Apostolic Administrator of Loikaw (2014); Titular Bishop of Nova Barbara (2009-2014); Auxiliary Bishop of Loikaw (2009-2014)

Orders
- Ordination: 28 March 1984 by John Baptist Gobbato
- Consecration: 21 November 2009 by Salvatore Pennacchio

Personal details
- Born: 1 August 1955 Union of Burma
- Died: 16 December 2020 (aged 65) Loikaw, Kayah State, Myanmar

Stephen Tjephe (1 August 1955 – 16 December 2020) was a Burmese Roman Catholic bishop.

Tjephe was born in Myanmar. He served as titular bishop of Nova Barbara and auxiliary bishop, from 2009 to 2014 and bishop of the Roman Catholic Diocese of Loikaw, Myanmar, from 2015 until his death in 2020.
