= Matthias U Shwe =

Burmese Roman Catholic prelate (1943–2021)

- Archbishop of Taunggyi
- Church: Catholic Church
- Archdiocese: Archdiocese of Taunggyi
- In office: 18 December 1989 – 12 April 2015
- Predecessor: John Baptist Gobbato
- Successor: Basilio Athai
- Previous posts: Titular Bishop of Uzzipari (1979-1989); Auxiliary Bishop of Taunggyi (1979-1989)

Orders
- Ordination: 12 April 1969
- Consecration: 13 December 1980 by John Baptist Gobbato

Personal details
- Born: 1 December 1943
- Died: 12 August 2021 (aged 77)

Matthias U Shwe (1 December 1943 – 12 August 2021) was a Burmese Roman Catholic prelate who served in the present-day Archdiocese of Taunggyi for 36 years. He served as the auxiliary bishop of the Roman Catholic Diocese of Taunggyi from 1979 to 1989 and the bishop of Taunggyi from 1989 to 1998. When the Diocese of Taunggyi was elected to the status of Roman Catholic Archdiocese of Taunggyi on 17 January 1998, Matthias U Shwe became the archbishop of Taunggyi. He continued to serve as archbishop from 1998 until his retirement on 12 April 2015. He also served as the rector of St. Joseph's Catholic Major Seminary in Yangon and chairman of the Myanmar Episcopal Commission for the Laity.

Notably, Matthias U Shwe was one of three Burmese Catholic bishops to invite the Jesuits back to Myanmar. The Jesuits, known as the Society of Jesus, were originally expelled from Burma by the military regime of Ne Win in 1962. Bishop U Shwe also founded the Sisters of Zetaman, a Burmese religious order of Catholic nuns, and co-founded the Little Way Missionary Priests of St. Therese. In addition to their base in Myanmar, the Little Way Missionary Priests are active in missionary work in Papua New Guinea and parts of Africa, as of 2021.

In 1987, Matthias U Shwe created the Little Evangelizers program, which encouraged young laypeople in the Diocese of Taunggyi to become missionaries and teachers. Volunteers in the program were trained in a variety of skills, including basic medical care, midwifery, catechesis, and Catholic theology. They were then sent to remote areas of Myanmar, where they served as medical aides, elementary school teachers, and missionaries.

U Shwe was born on 10 December 1943. He was ordained as Catholic priest in 1969. He was appointed an auxiliary bishop of the Roman Catholic Diocese of Taunggyi on 20 December 1979, and elevated to Bishop on 13 December 1980. In January 1998, he became Archbishop of Taunggyi, a position he held until his retirement in 2015.

Archbishop Emeritus Matthias U Shwe died on 12 August 2021, at the age of 78. His funeral mass was held at St. Joseph's Cathedral in Taunggyi by Archbishop Basilio Athai on 14 August 2021.
