= Paul Zingtung Grawng =

Myanmar Catholic Archbishop (1935–2020)

- Archbishop of Mandalay
- Church: Catholic Church
- Archdiocese: Archdiocese of Mandalay
- In office: 15 May 2003 – 3 April 2014
- Predecessor: Alphonse U Than Aung
- Successor: Nicholas Mang Thang
- Previous posts: Bishop of Myitkyina (1976-2003); Titular Bishop of Rusguniae (1976); Auxiliary Bishop of Myitkyina (1976)

Orders
- Ordination: 27 March 1965
- Consecration: 3 April 1976 by John James Howe

Personal details
- Born: 20 March 1938 Burma, British Empire
- Died: 24 October 2020 (aged 82) Mandalay, Mandalay Region, Myanmar

Paul Zingtung Grawng (20 March 1938 – 24 October 2020) was a Myanmar Roman Catholic archbishop.

Zingtung Grawng was born in Myanmar and was ordained to the priesthood in 1965. He served as titular bishop of 'Rusguniea' and as auxiliary bishop and bishop of the Roman Catholic Diocese of Myitkyina, Myanmar, from 1976 to 2003 and as archbishop of the Roman Catholic Archdiocese of Mandalay Myanmar, from 2003 to 2014.
