= Diocese of Ji'an =

Roman Catholic diocese in China

Diocese of Ji'an Dioecesis Chinganensis 天主教吉安教区

Location
- Country: China
- Ecclesiastical province: Nanchang
- Metropolitan: Nanchang

Statistics
- Area: 37,000 km^{2} (14,000 sq mi)
- Population: Total; Catholics: (as of 1950); 3,000,000; 24,232 (0.8%)

Information
- Rite: Latin Rite
- Cathedral: Cathedral in Ji'an

Current leadership
- Bishop: Sede Vacante

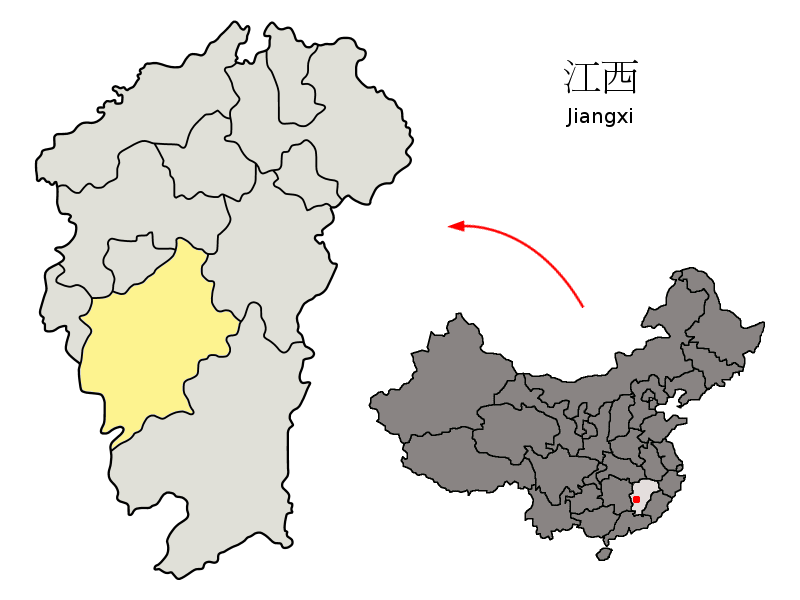
Location of Ji'an Prefecture (yellow) within Jiangxi Province of China

The Roman Catholic Diocese of Ji'an/Kian (Latin: Chinganen(sis), Chinese: 吉安) is a diocese located in the city of Ji'an (Jiangxi) in the ecclesiastical province of Nanchang in China.

== History ==
- August 19, 1879: Established as the Apostolic Vicariate of Southern Kiangsi 江西南境 from the Apostolic Vicariate of Kiangsi 江西
- August 25, 1920: Renamed as Apostolic Vicariate of Jing’an 吉安
- December 3, 1924: Renamed as Apostolic Vicariate of Ji’anfu 吉安府
- April 11, 1946: Promoted as Diocese of Ji’an 吉安

== Leadership ==
- Bishops of Ji'an 吉安 (Roman rite)
  - Bishop Gaetano Mignani, C.M. (April 11, 1946 – January 29, 1973)
- Vicars Apostolic of Ji'anfu 吉安府 (Roman Rite)
  - Bishop Gaetano Mignani, C.M. (October 15, 1931 – April 11, 1946)
  - Bishop Nicola Ciceri, C.M. (July 3, 1907 – October 15, 1931)
- Vicars Apostolic of Southern Kiangsi 江西南境 (Roman Rite)
  - Bishop Jules-Auguste Coqset, C.M. (順其衡) (June 29, 1887 – May 3, 1907)
  - Bishop Adrien-François Rouger, C.M. (September 7, 1883 – March 31, 1887)
