= John Hsane Hgyi =

Myanma Catholic bishop (1953–2021)

John Hsane Hgyi (December 15, 1953 – July 22, 2021) was a Burmese Roman Catholic priest and prelate. He served as the Bishop of the Roman Catholic Diocese of Pathein from May 24, 2003, until his death from COVID-19 in July during the pandemic in Myanmar.

== Biography ==
John Hsane Hgyi was born on December 15, 1953, in the village of Pyingadoe Mayanchaung to parents, Mahn Benedict Ja Aye and Daw Zita Chit Pan. He was a member of the Karen people.

He was ordained as a Catholic priest on March 7, 1982. He was appointed an auxiliary bishop of the Diocese of Pathein on March 22, 2003.

Pope John Paul II appointed Hsane Hgyi as Bishop of the Roman Catholic Diocese of Pathein on May 24, 2003, and he was installed on August 24, 2003. Hgyi simultaneously served as president of the Catholic Bishops' Conference of Myanmar (CBCM) from 2012 to 2014. At the time of his death in 2021, Hsane Hgyi was also serving as vice president of the Catholic Bishops' Conference of Myanmar (CBCM) and the chairman of the Episcopal Commission for Ecumenism and Interreligious Dialogue.

During the COVID-19 pandemic in Myanmar, Hsane Hgyi reminded clergy and parishioners to take precautions to prevent COVID-19 infections. He issued a statement in June 2021, saying "We need to do prevention as there is no proper healthcare service and a lack of volunteers and healthcare workers at quarantine centers. The rate of infections is rising and the death toll has risen, so we must be very careful about the danger of the virus."

However, on July 16, 2021, Hsane Hgyi, who also suffered from diabetes, reported feeling ill and began self-quarantining in his room. Bishop John Hsane Hgyi died from complications of COVID-19 in Pathein, Myanmar, on July 22, 2021, at the age of 67.

In addition to Bishop Hsane Hgyi, six other Catholic priests and nuns died from COVID-19 in Myanmar during the months of June and July 2021.
