= Gaetano Mignani =

Italian Prelate of the Catholic Church

Gaetano Mignani CM
- Bishop of Ji'an
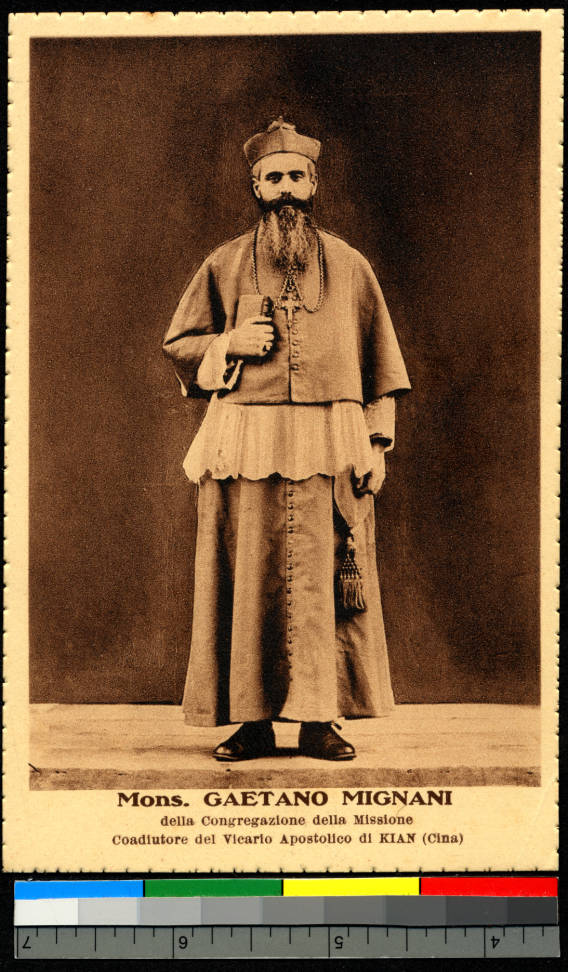
- Church: Catholic Church
- Diocese: Diocese of Ji'an
- In office: 15 October 1931 – 29 January 1973
- Predecessor: Nicola Ciceri
- Successor: Sede vacante
- Previous posts: Titular Bishop of Cassandria (1928-1946); Coadjutor Vicar Apostolic of Ji’anfu (1928-1931)

Orders
- Ordination: 19 March 1905
- Consecration: 17 February 1925 by Paul-Marie Dumond

Personal details
- Born: 31 August 1882 Piumazzo di Castelfranco, Province of Modena, Kingdom of Italy
- Died: 29 January 1973 (aged 90) Rome, Italy

Gaetano Mignani (31 August 1882 – 29 January 1973) was an Italian prelate of the Catholic Church. He served as Apostolic vicar of Kianfu (Ji'an Prefecture), he became the first Catholic Bishop of the Roman Catholic Diocese of Ji'an when the region was elevated to a diocese in 1946, a position he would hold until 1951, when the new Communist government expelled him from the country.

== Biography ==
Born 31 August 1882 in Piumazza di Castelfranco Emilia, Bologna, Italy, Mignani was a member of the Congregation of the Mission, commonly known as the Vincentians, professing at 21 years of age in 1904. Ordained to the priesthood on 19 March 1905, Mignani served as a missionary in China. At the age of 45, he was appointed Apostolic Vicar of Kianfu, receiving his episcopal consecration with the titular see of Cassandria on 17 February 1929.

Succeeding to the Vicariate of Kianfu on 15 October 1931 following the retirement of Monsignor Nicola Cicero CM. When Kianfu [Ji'an], was elevated to a diocese on 11 April 1946 by Pope Pius XII, Mignani became its first bishop.

On 14 June 1951, Chinese police escorted him to the Hong Kong frontier and he was expelled from China.

He participated in all four sessions of the Second Vatican Council.

Mignani retained his office until his death in Rome on 29 January 1973, at 90 years of age.

In his will, Bishop Mignani requested to be buried in his Cathedral of Ji'an, but due to political unrest in China, his remains still lie at the Verano Cemetery of Rome.
