= Catholic Church in Myanmar =

The Catholic Church in Myanmar (also known as Burma) is part of the worldwide Catholic Church, under the spiritual leadership of the Pope in Rome. In 2020, there were approximately 700,000 Catholics in Myanmar—accounting for around 1.29% of the total population.

The country is divided into sixteen dioceses, including three archdioceses. Each of the archdioceses is also headed by a metropolitan. There are over 1,000 priests and 2,000 nuns serving across 460 parishes.

The representative of the Holy See to the Catholic Church and the government of Myanmar is an apostolic nuncio, though the position has been vacant since 2022.

== Episcopal Conference of Myanmar ==
The membership comprises bishops and auxiliary bishops of the 16 dioceses of Myanmar. As of 2020, the president of the CBCM is Cardinal Charles Maung Bo.

== Dioceses of Myanmar ==
=== Ecclesiastical Province of Mandalay ===
- Archdiocese of Mandalay
  - Diocese of Banmaw
  - Diocese of Hakha
  - Diocese of Lashio
  - Diocese of Myitkyina
  - Diocese of Kalay

=== Ecclesiastical Province of Taunggyi ===
- Archdiocese of Taunggyi
  - Diocese of Kengtung
  - Diocese of Loikaw
  - Diocese of Pekhon
  - Diocese of Taungngu

=== Ecclesiastical Province of Yangon ===
- Archdiocese of Yangon
  - Diocese of Hpa-an
  - Diocese of Mawlamyine
  - Diocese of Pathein
  - Diocese of Pyay

== Ecclesiastical history of Burma ==
The ecclesiastical history of Christianity in Burma begins before its annexation by the British, when it still consisted of the kingdoms of Ava and Pegu.

=== Catholic missions ===
In 1548 St. Francis Xavier petitioned Father Rodriguez for missionaries to go to Pegu, but nothing is known as to the outcome of his request.

Chief mercenary Filipe de Brito e Nicote promptly established Goa-backed Portuguese rule at Thanlyin in 1603. The country was in chaos. Bayinnaung's grandson, King Anaukpetlun, defeated the Portuguese in 1613 and mission work was stopped. During that period, Burmese well-known crown prince and poet Natshinnaung was converted to Catholicism and was baptised by a priest from Goa.

In 1699, the vicar apostolic of Siam and the bishop of Meliapur (Portuguese India) had a dispute concerning the jurisdiction over Pegu, and Charles-Thomas Maillard De Tournon, legatus a latere, decided against the vicar apostolic.

The actual work of evangelising Ava and Pegu began under the pontificate of Innocent XIII, who, in 1722, sent Father Sigismond de Calchi, a Barnabite, and Father Vittoni, of the same order, to Burma. After many trials and tribulations they succeeded in obtaining permission to preach with full liberty the Gospel of Christ. In 1741, Benedict XIV definitely established the mission, appointing Father Galizia Vicar Apostolic, and placing the Barnabites in charge of the work. The best-known of the Barnabites was Father Sangermano, who worked in Ava and Rangoon from 1783 to 1808; his A Description of the Burmese Empire was first published in 1833.

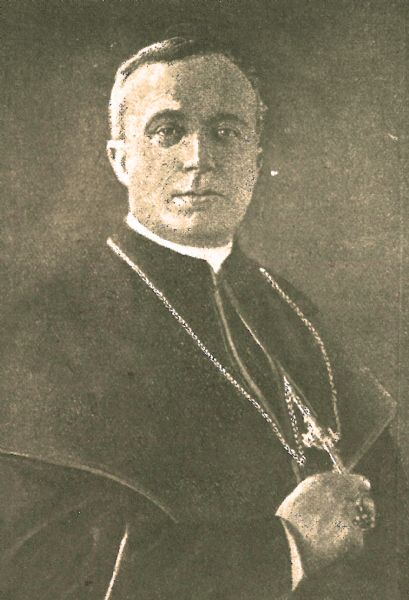
Bishop Giovanni Ceretti, OMV

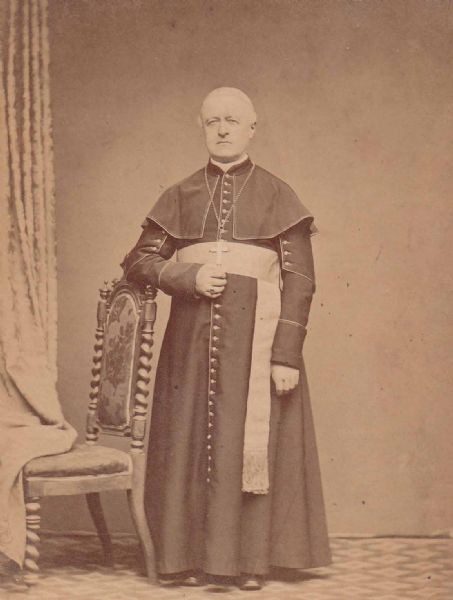
Archbishop Giovanni Balma, OMV

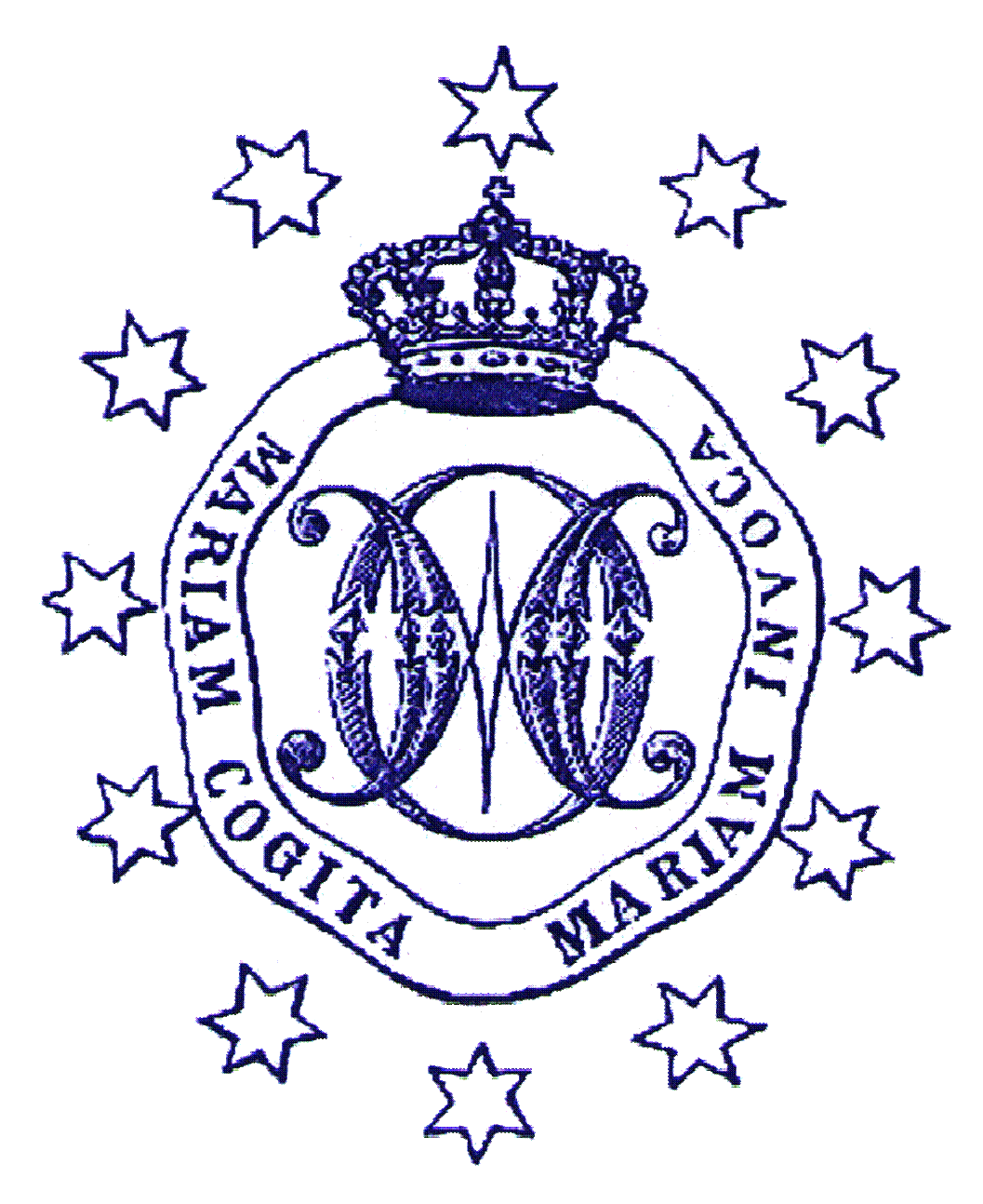
Logo of the Oblates of the Virgin Mary

The Barnabites having given up the mission, Pius VIII sent Frederic Cao, a member of the Congregation of Pious Schools, and titular Bishop of Zama (18 June 1830). Gregory XVI placed the mission under the Congregation of the Oblates of the Virgin Mary (Congregatio Oblatorum Beatae Mariae Virginis, OMV) of Pinerolo, Italy, by appointing Giovanni Ceretti (+ 29 December 1855), a member of this institute, and titular Bishop of Adrianople (Edirne), as first vicar apostolic. About this time (the year 1845), Catholics of the two kingdoms numbered 2500. Giovanni Balma (+ 5 April 1881) succeeded as vicar apostolic on 5 September 1848, but the war with the British rendered his labours ineffectual, and the mission was abandoned around 1852.

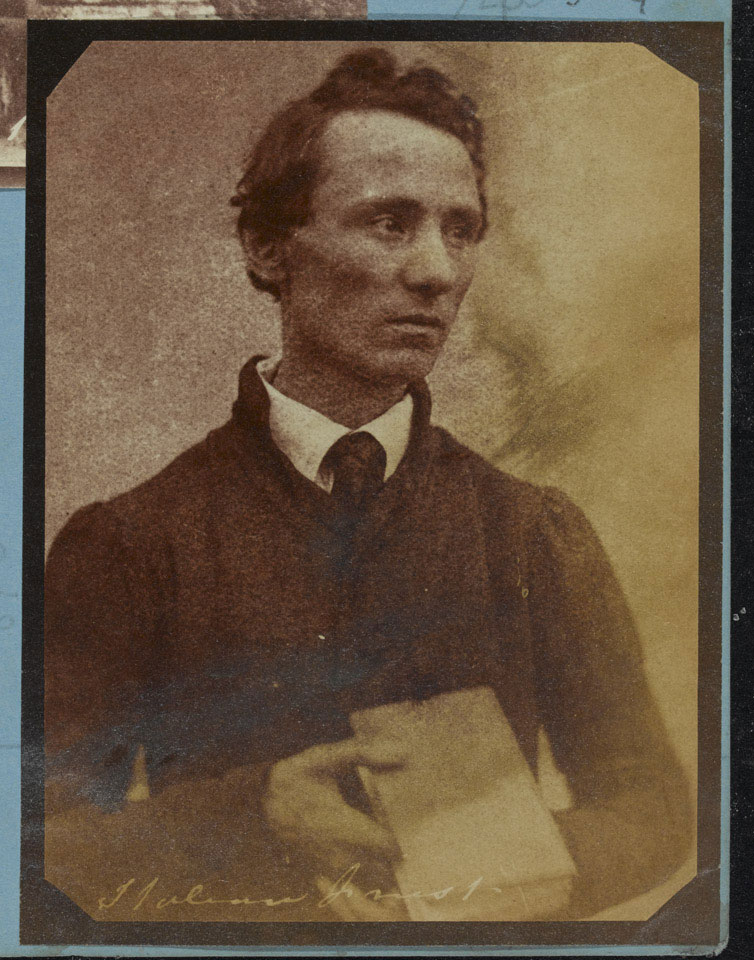
Italian priest, Burma, by John McCosh, 1852

The British had, in reality, begun to assume control of Burma in 1824, but it was not until 20 December 1852 that the East India Company, after a bloody war, annexed the entire kingdom of Pegu, a territory as large as England. Many years later, the kingdom of Ava was also taken by the British, and with the conquest of Rangoon the whole of Burma came into the possession of Great Britain. The Congregation of the Oblates of the Virgin Mary having withdrawn from the mission, the vicariate was placed under the control of the vicar apostolic of Siam in 1855. At this date, the kingdoms of Ava and Pegu contained 11 priests and 5320 Catholics.

Burma, in the mid-nineteenth century, was bounded on the east by China and Siam, and on the west by Assam and Bengal. Its area was approximately 444,001 km^{2}, while that of Great Britain and Ireland is 310,798 km^{2}, but it's not densely populated. For some ten years, the mission remained under the administration of the vicar apostolic of Siam, but such a condition could not be indefinitely prolonged without compromising its future. A decree of Propaganda Fide on 27 November 1806, accordingly divided Burma into three vicariates, named respectively with references to their geographical positions, Northern Burma, Southern Burma, and Eastern Burma. The boundaries then fixed were abrogated on 28 June 1870, by another decree of Propaganda, which constituted these three vicariates as they now are.

==== Northern Burma Vicariate ====
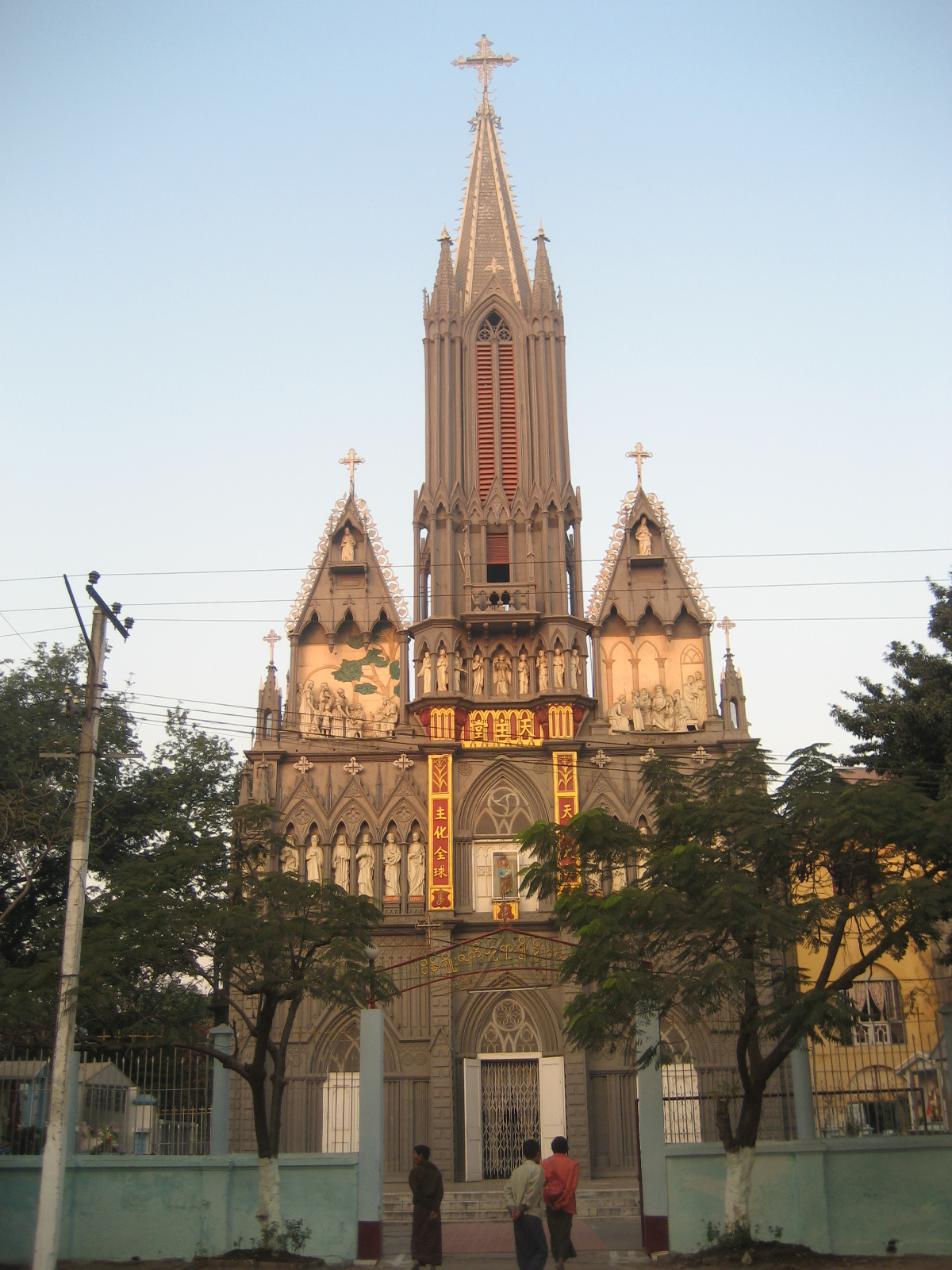
St Joseph's Catholic Church in Mandalay

This vicariate, which has been entrusted to the Missions Étrangères of Paris, was bounded on the north by the Chinese province of Yunnan, on the east by the River Salween, on the south by Karenni and Lower Burma, and on the west by Manipur, the Garo Hills, and the independent territories of Tipperah and Assam.

In an early 20th-century population of 3,500,000, there were 7,248 Catholics, spiritually served by 22 European clergy of the Missions Étrangères of Paris and 3 native priests with 47 churches or chapels. The vicariate possessed 18 schools with 754 children, a seminary with 22 students, 2 boarding schools with 160 pupils and 6 orphanages with 315 orphans. This is the most dense. The apostolic vicar is at Mandalay. The stations having one chapel and a resident missionary were Pyinmana, Yamèthin, Magyidaw, Chanthagon, Myokine, Chaung-u, Nabet, Shwebo, Chanthaywa, Monhla, Bhano and Maymyo. At Mandalay, there were, besides the cathedral, the Tamil church of St. Xavier, a Chinese church and that of St. John's Asylum. The language commonly used in this vicariate is Burmese, but residents ordinarily employ their respective native tongues, which accounts for the Chinese church at Mandalay. This city of 188,000 inhabitants was a bustling centre of traffic between Lower Burma and the Province of Yunnan; hence the large Chinese element in the population.

==== Eastern Burma Vicariate ====
The vicariate was entrusted to the Milan Seminary of Foreign Missions. Its boundaries, determined by decree on 26 August 1889, were: on the north the Chinese province of Yun-nan; on the east, the Mekong, the subsequent course of which bounds Cambodia and Annam; on the south, Karenni and Shan; on the west, the River Salween and part of the course of the Sittang.

The vicariate was made up of two quite distinct portions connected almost at right angles by a somewhat narrow strip of territory. The first of these portions comprised Toungoo and the regions lying between the Sittang and the Salween as far as 20 north latitude; from this parallel of latitude, the second portion stretches north to the Tropic of Cancer, bordered on the east and south by China, Annam and Siam, and on the west by the River Salween.

The beginnings of the mission go back to 1868 when the Milan Seminary of Foreign Missions sent thither Eugenio Biffi as prefect apostolic, accompanied by Sebastian Carbode, Conti and Rocco Tornatori. The last named of these was the present vicar apostolic, and has resided for decades in the vicariate. There were 10,300 Catholics in this vicariate, the population of which amounted to something like 2,000,000. The vicar apostolic resided in the Leitko Hills and visited 130 villages in the Karenni district, with 10,000 Catholics—almost the whole Catholic population of the vicariate.

In the early 20th century, there was a school with 65 children, a convent of the Sisters of Nazareth of Milan, with 40 girls, and in some villages, the beginnings of schools with a few pupils. Toungoo, in the south of the vicariate, with 300 Catholics, had an English school of 130 children of various races, a Native school of 100 children, and a convent of the Sisters of the Reparation of Nazareth of Milan with 70 girls. There were 10 priests. In 1902, there were 140 conversions from paganism and 6 from Protestantism. The stations provided were, besides the residence of the vicar apostolic, Toungoo, Northern Karenni, Yedashe and Karenni.

==== Southern Burma vicariate ====
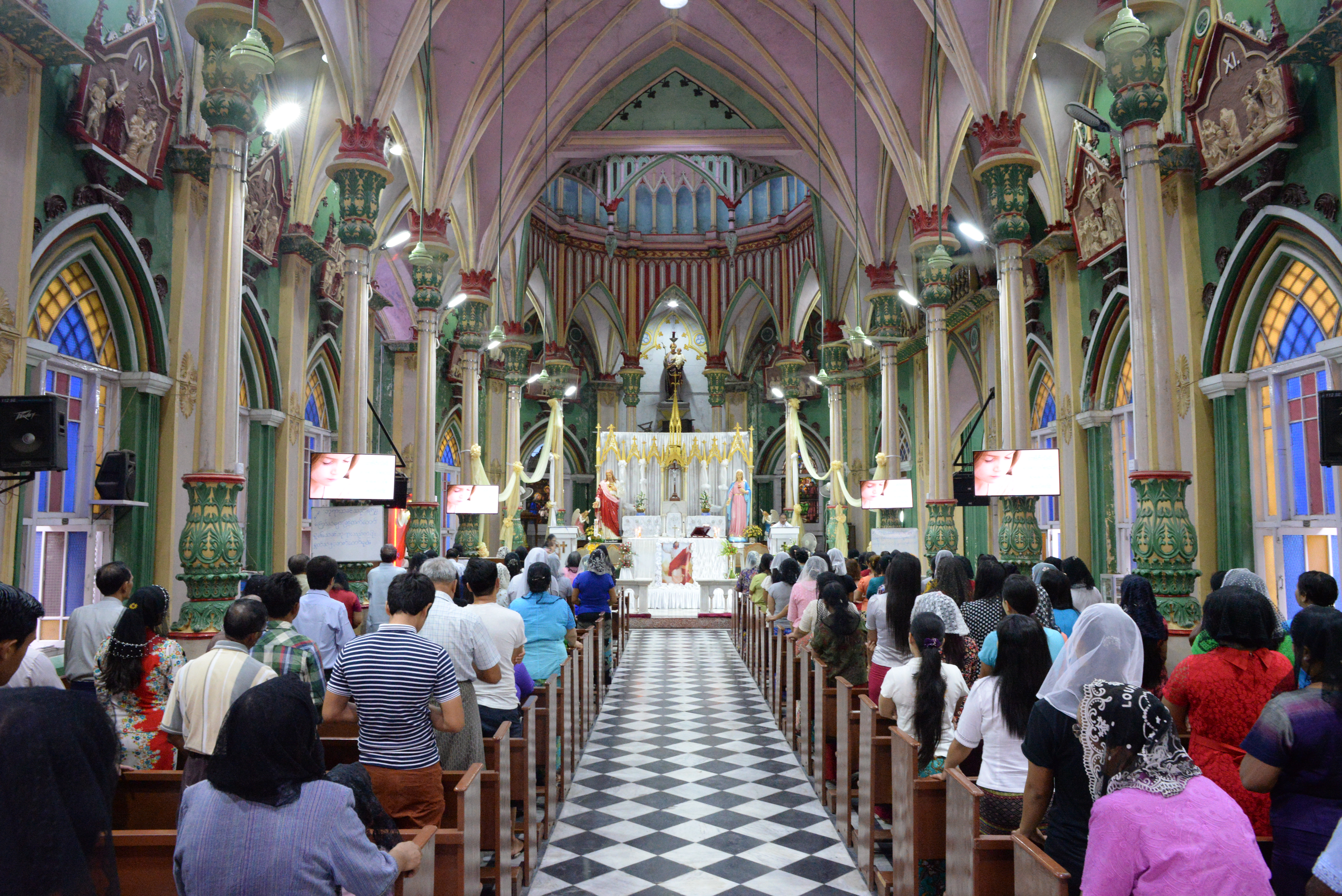
Mass in St. Joseph's Church in Mandalay

This vicariate, entrusted to the Missions Étrangères of Paris, comprised all the territory included in British (Lower) Burma before the annexation of Upper Burma, except the province of Arakan (attached in 1879 to the Diocese of Dacca) and the Toungoo district (assigned to the above Vicariate of Eastern Burma). It is bounded on the east by the Diocese of Dacca, on the north by Eastern Burma, on the west by Siam and on the south by the sea. It extends from the nineteenth to the tenth parallel of north latitude and, beginning from Moulmein, forms a long and rather narrow strip of land shut in between Siam on the one side and the sea on the other.

In a population estimated in the early 20th century at 4,000,000, as many as 45,579 Catholics were found distributed among 23 stations, the most important of which in respect of Catholic population being: Rangoon, with 2336 Catholics; Moulmein, 1400; Bassein, 1040; Myaung-mya, 4000; Kanaztogon, 4482; Mittagon, 3000; Maryland, 2412; Gyobingauk Tharrawady, 2200. The seat of the vicariate apostolic was at Rangoon. The clergy numbered 49 European priests, and the vicariate had 231 churches and chapels. The schools were conducted by the Brothers of the Christian Schools, the Sisters of the Good Shepherd, of St. Joseph of the Apparition, and of St. Francis Xavier, those known under this last name being natives. The vicariate supported 12 Anglo-native schools with 4501 children, and 65 Burman or Tamil schools which give instruction to 2200 pupils. The Little Sisters of the Poor, 9 in number, take care of 55 old people at Rangoon, and the Missionaries of Mary's asylum sheltered 100 children, besides which there were 21 orphanages, containing 790 children, under the care of the above-mentioned religious communities. The vicariate was thus further advanced in Christianity than the other two, due to its greater accessibility and the British influence, which developed faster in these regions. In 1845, as has been seen, there were only 2500 Catholics in Burma; sixty years later, there were 59,127. The fact that there are still more Catholics in Burma today than in neighbouring Thailand is likely due to this missionary activity in a British colony; Thailand was never ruled by Europeans.

Alexandre Cardot, titular Bishop of Limyra, Vicar Apostolic of Southern Burma, born at Fresse, Haute-Saône, France, 9 January 1859, and educated in the seminaries of Lunel and Vesoul and of the Missions Étrangères, began his labours in the mission field in 1879, and in 1893 was appointed coadjutor to Bishop Bigandet, his predecessor in the vicariate, who consecrated him at Rangoon (24 June 1893). He succeeded to the vicariate on the death of Bishop Bigandet, 19 March 1894.

The representative of the Holy See to the Catholic Church and the government of Burma is an apostolic nuncio, though the position has been vacant since 2022.

== See also ==
- Christianity in Burma
- Protestants in Burma
- List of saints from Asia
