= Roman Catholic Diocese of Mindat =

Roman Catholic Diocese

Coordinates: 21°22′17.0″N 93°58′29.2″E

The Roman Catholic Diocese of Mindat is an ecclesiastical jurisdiction in Myanmar. It was created on 25 January 2025. The cathedral of the diocese is the Church of Most Sacred Heart of Jesus in Mindat in Chin State and the bishop-elect is Msgr. Augustine Thang Zawm Hung.
