= Diocese of Banmaw =

Latin Catholic ecclesiastical jurisdiction in Burma

Coordinates: 24.2536°N 97.2319°E

Diocese of Banmaw Dioecesis Banmavensis

Location
- Country: Myanmar
- Ecclesiastical province: Mandalay
- Metropolitan: Mandalay

Statistics
- Area: 10,373 km^{2} (4,005 sq mi)
- Population: Total; Catholics: (as of 2012); 341,693; 30,829 (9%)
- Parishes: 13

Information
- Denomination: Catholic
- Sui iuris church: Latin Church
- Rite: Roman Rite
- Established: 28 August 2006
- Cathedral: Cathedral of St Patrick in Banmaw

Current leadership
- Pope: Leo XIV
- Bishop: Raymond Sumlut Gam
- Metropolitan Archbishop: Nicolas Mang Thang

The Diocese of Banmaw (Latin: Dioecesis Banmavensis) is a Latin Catholic diocese of the Catholic Church located in the Kachin State in northwestern Myanmar. It is a suffragan of the Archdiocese of Mandalay.

The diocese was created on August 26, 2006 by splitting off the southern part of the Diocese of Myitkyina. On November 26 the first bishop Raymond Sumlut Gam was ordained, and the St Patrick church was elevated to the cathedral of the diocese by Archbishop Salvatore Pennacchio, Apostolic Nuncio for Myanmar.

The diocese covers an area of 10,373 km². It is subdivided into 10 parishes. 26,070 of the 450,000 people in the area belong to the Catholic Church.

The diocese covers the districts of Banmaw, Mansi, Momauk and Shwegu, all in Kachin State. Neighboring dioceses are Myitkyina to the north west and to the east, the archdiocese of Mandalay and the Archdiocese of Taunggyi to the south.
