= Charles Arsène Bourdon =

French bishop (1834–1918)

Charles Arsène Bourdon M.E.P. (1 May 1834 – 3 October 1918) was a French Catholic missionary and bishop in Burma and Singapore.

== Early life ==
Charles Arsène Bourdon, born in Caligny, Orne, on 1 May 1834, was descended from an old Norman family. He was ordained as a priest of the La Société des Missions Etrangères in 1860, and in 1863 was sent to Rangoon to join the Burmah mission under Bishop Bigandet.

== Career ==
In 1872, he was appointed the first Vicar Apostolic Emeritus of Upper Burma with residence in Mandalay, and a year later was ordained as Titular Bishop of Dardanus. In 1877, he returned to France due to ill-health but returned a year later to resume his duties.

In 1887, he resigned from the Burma mission, and after a short residence in Hong Kong went to Singapore. Although not attached to the Vicariate Apostolic of Malacca-Singapore, he continued ministering to the people, visiting patients at the General Hospital, and serving as H.M. Military Chaplain, a post he held from 1888 to 1911.

He died on 3 October 1918, aged 84, in Singapore.
