= Diocese of Kalay =

Coordinates: 23.1913°N 94.0511°E

Diocese of Kalay Dioecesis Kalayensis

Location
- Country: Myanmar
- Ecclesiastical province: Mandalay
- Metropolitan: Mandalay

Statistics
- Area: 22,235 km^{2} (8,585 sq mi)
- Population: Total; Catholics: (as of 2011); 845,646; 51045 (6%)
- Parishes: 22
- Congregations: <8!-- Number of congregations in the diocese -->

Information
- Denomination: Roman Catholic
- Sui iuris church: Latin Church
- Rite: Roman Rite
- Established: 22 May 2010
- Cathedral: Cathedral of St Mary in Kalaymyo
- Patron saint: <!Ss Peter and Paul-- Patron saint(s) of the diocese (or archdiocese) -->
- Secular priests: 39

Current leadership
- Pope: Leo XIV
- Bishop: Felix Lian Khen Thang
- Metropolitan Archbishop: Marco Tinwin
- Vicar General: Msgr. John Deng Cin Khup

The Roman Catholic Diocese of Kalay is a diocese of the Catholic Church in Burma. It was established by Pope Benedict XVI on 22 May 2010 by bifurcating the Diocese of Hakha and is suffragan to the Archdiocese of Mandalay.

Kalay diocese is located in the northwestern part of Myanmar (Burma), bordering India, covering some part of the Chin State and part of Sagaing Division. It is bounded by the diocese of Myitkyina on the Northeast, Mandalay on the East and Hakha on the South. There are 22 parishes grouped into 4 vicariates or zones namely – Kalay, Khampat, Tiddim and Tonzang. It is mainly inhabited by the Zomi ethnic groups who are also known as Chin.

== See also ==
- Catholic Church in Burma
