= Diocese of Lashio =

Coordinates: 22.9410°N 97.7505°E

Diocese of Lashio Dioecesis Lashioensis

Location
- Country: Myanmar
- Ecclesiastical province: Mandalay
- Metropolitan: Mandalay

Statistics
- Area: 60,559 km^{2} (23,382 sq mi)
- Population: Total; Catholics: (as of 2023); 2,638,180; 30,574 (1.2%)
- Parishes: 22

Information
- Denomination: Catholic
- Sui iuris church: Latin Church
- Rite: Roman Rite
- Established: 20 November 1975 (As Prefecture Apostolic of Lashio); 7 July 1990 (As Diocese of Lashio)
- Cathedral: Cathedral of the Sacred Heart in Lashio
- Secular priests: 49 (45 Diocesan, 4 Religious Orders)

Current leadership
- Pope: Leo XIV
- Bishop: Lucas Jeimphaug Dau Ze, S.D.B.
- Metropolitan Archbishop: Marco Tin Win
- Bishops emeritus: Philip Lasap Za Hawng

The Diocese of Lashio is a Latin Catholic diocese in Myanmar centered at Lashio. The diocesan territory covers a land area of 60,559 square kilometers.

== History ==
The mission territory of the Northern Shan State was first evangelized around 1869 by MEP Fathers, then directing the Apostolic vicariate of Northern Burma.

At a later phase in 1930, the PIME Italian Fathers took over and much expansion was made both east and west of the Salween River. A two-pronged mission drive was made at that early stage from the two Prefectures of Lashio and Kengtong. Under the aegis of the Italian Missionaries, who were joined by a group of zealous diocesan priests, much headway was made. From the very start, a tough little group of Italian Reparation sisters worked alongside the priests. They helped open schools, boarding houses, nurseries and clinics.

== Nationalization ==
The nationalization of all missions and also private schools was a terrible blow. The Church lost all of her schools overnight. However, it was also a blessing in disguise. The Religious now turned to direct mission apostolate. The Holy See entrusted Lashio to the Salesians in 1975, making it a Prefecture. Monsignor Jocelyn Madden, the Salesian Delegate, was the first Apostolic Prefect. On his early retirement, another Salesian, Monsignor Charles Bo, succeeded him. More development and further expansion took place. In 1989, twin celebrations were held: the golden jubilee of the start of the mission and the reopening of the Wa State Mission (the extensive area east of the Salween River).

== Creation of bishopric ==
In recognition of the work of the Salesians, the Vatican moved fast. On 16 December 1990, Monsignor Charles Bo was appointed the first bishop of the newly created Diocese of Lashio.

A further landmark was made in 1991, when the new Catechist Training Center was inaugurated in Lashiogyi. Under the able guidance of the De La Salle Brothers, a two-year special course is given to catechists from all dioceses.

Then, Bishop Bo was appointed Bishop of Pathein on 24 May 1996. Bishop Philip Lasap Za Hawng was installed as the new bishop of Lashio diocese on 4 October 1998. On the same solemn occasion, two diocesan priests were ordained for Lashio by Bishop Bo, former prelate of Lashio.

Bishop Za Hawng continued to promote the newly founded Missionary Congregation of Brothers and Sisters of St. Paul. However, in 2000, the brothers decided to move to Pathein, where the founder could give close attention to their formation. The sisters remained in the Diocese of Lashio and continue to grow in numbers. Now, there are 70 professed sisters who are in 16 houses—11 in the home diocese of Lashio, three in Pathein, one in Pyay, and one in the Diocese of Myitkyina. In June 2005, the Novitiate of St. Paul Sisters from Lashio started their mission in the Archdiocese of Yangon, according to the wish of the Archbishop of Yangon, the founder of the Association of the Missionary Sisters of St. Paul.

In the span of some 20 years, the diocese has ordained new diocesan priests. Bishop Bo also founded a Missionary Congregation of Brothers and Sisters of St. Paul. Its special charism is direct evangelization ad gentes. It started with a few teenage boys and girls in 1990 and is now a flourishing congregation of 49 professed Religious. It is spread out in 13 houses, 10 in Lashio, 2 in Pathein diocese, and 1 in Pyay diocese.

== Ordinaries ==
Prefects of Lashio (Roman Rite)

- John Jocelyn Madden, S.D.B. (20 November 1975 – 19 December 1985), resigned
- Charles Maung Bo, S.D.B. (16 May 1986 – 7 July 1990 see below)

Bishops of Lashio (Roman Rite)

- Charles Maung Bo, S.D.B. (see above 7 July 1990 – 13 March 1996), appointed Bishop of Pathein
  - Apostolic Administrator Charles Maung Bo, S.D.B. (16 March 1996 – 3 April 1998), Bishop of Pathein
- Philip Lasap Za Hawng (3 April 1998 – 24 June 2020), retired
- Lucas Jeimphaung Dau Ze, S.D.B. (24 June 2020 – Present)

Coadjutor Bishop of Lashio

- Lucas Jeimphaung Dau Ze, S.D.B. (2019-2020)
