= Diocese of Pathein =

Latin Catholic diocese in Myanmar

Coordinates: 16°46′34.7″N 94°44′01.6″E

Diocese of Pathein Dioecesis Patheinensis

Location
- Country: Myanmar
- Ecclesiastical province: Yangon
- Metropolitan: Yangon

Statistics
- Area: 25,328 km^{2} (9,779 sq mi)
- Population: Total; Catholics: (as of 2004); 4,992,080; 71,908 (1.4%)

Information
- Denomination: Catholic Church
- Sui iuris church: Latin Church
- Rite: Roman Rite
- Established: 1 January 1955 (As Diocese of Bassein); 8 October 1991 (As Diocese of Pathein)
- Cathedral: St Peter’s Cathedral in Pathein

Current leadership
- Pope: Leo XIV
- Bishop elect: Henry Eikhlein
- Metropolitan Archbishop: Charles Maung Bo

The Diocese of Pathein (Lat: Diocesis Patheinensis) is a Latin Catholic diocese of the Catholic Church in Burma. It is headquartered in the city of Pathein.

== History ==
The diocese was erected as the diocese of Bassein in 1955, from the vicariate apostolic of Rangoon, which eventually became the Archdiocese of Yangon. In 1991, the name of the diocese was changed to the diocese of Pathein. The diocese is a suffragan of the Archdiocese of Yangon.

== Ordinaries ==
- George Maung Kyaw (1 Jan 1955 Appointed - 1968 Died)
- Joseph Mahn Erie (16 Feb 1968 Appointed - 3 Jun 1982 Resigned)
- Joseph Valerius Sequeri (24 Jan 1986 Appointed - 22 Feb 1992 Retired)
- John Gabriel (22 Feb 1992 Succeeded - 16 Aug 1994 Died)
- Charles Maung Bo, S.D.B. (13 Mar 1996 Appointed - 24 May 2003 Appointed, Archbishop of Yangon)
- John Hsane Hgyi (24 May 2003 Appointed - 22 Jul 2021 Died)
- Henry Eikhlein (31 May 2023 – present)

== See also ==
- Catholic Church in Burma
