= Diocese of Pyay =

Latin Catholic diocese in Myanmar

Coordinates: 18°47′48.5″N 95°13′09.7″E

Diocese of Pyay Dioecesis Pyayensis

Location
- Country: Myanmar
- Ecclesiastical province: Yangon
- Metropolitan: Yangon

Statistics
- Area: 80,906 km^{2} (31,238 sq mi)
- Population: Total; Catholics: (as of 2004); 9,028,000; 24,300 (0.3%)

Information
- Denomination: Catholic Church
- Sui iuris church: Latin Church
- Rite: Roman Rite
- Established: 9 July 1940 (As Prefecture Apostolic of Akyab); 19 September 1957 (As Prefecture Apostolic of Prome); 21 February 1961 (As Diocese of Prome); 8 October 1991 (As Diocese of Pyay)
- Cathedral: St Paul’s Cathedral in Pyay

Current leadership
- Pope: Leo XIV
- Bishop: Peter Tin Wai
- Metropolitan Archbishop: Charles Maung Bo
- Bishops emeritus: Alexander Pyone Cho

The Diocese of Pyay (Lat: Diocesis Pyayensis) is a suffragan Latin Catholic diocese of the Catholic Church in Burma, in the ecclesiastical province of the Metropolitan Archdiocese of Yangon (Rangoon), but like that depends on the missionary Roman Congregation for the Evangelization of Peoples.

Its cathedral episcopal see is St. Paul’s Cathedral, in Pyay, Bago Region.

== Statistics ==
As per 2014, it pastorally served 25,810 Catholics (0.3% of 9,889,000 total) on 80,938 km² in 20 parishes and 1 mission with 40 priests (39 diocesan, 1 religious), 110 lay religious (5 brothers, 105 sisters) and 13 seminarians.

== History ==
Originally erected on 9 July 1940 as the Apostolic prefecture of Akyab, the pre-diocese has the distinction of being the only ecclesiastical jurisdiction in Burma created from the Diocese of Chittagong (in Bengal, now Metropolitan; by La Salette Fathers (M.S.) mission).

On 19 September 1957, its name was changed to the Apostolic prefecture of Prome.

On 21 February 1961, the prefecture was elevated to a full bishopric as Diocese of Prome.

Finally on 8 October 1991, the diocese was renamed the Diocese of Pyay and became a suffragan of the Archdiocese of Yangon

The resignation for health reasons of Auxiliary Bishop Gregory Taik Maung, appointed in 1991, who was serving as Apostolic Administrator, was accepted by Pope Benedict XVI on Friday, July 16, 2010. On Friday, December 3, 2010, Pope Benedict XVI accepted the resignation of Bishop Joseph Devellerez Thaung Shwe as bishop and appointed Burmese priest Alexander Pyone Cho, a native of the Pyay Diocese (on loan "fidei donum" to the Diocese of Salina, Kansas, USA), as Bishop of Pyay.

== Ordinaries ==
(all Roman Rite, till 2010 foreign members of a Latin missionary congregation)

Apostolic Prefect of Akyab

- Thomas Albert Newman, M.S † (12 July 1940 - 2 October 1975 resigned see below) born USA

Apostolic Prefect of Prome

- Thomas Albert Newman, M.S. † (see above 2 October 1975 - 1961.02.21 see below)

Suffragan Bishops of Prome

- Thomas Albert Newman, M.S. † (see above 1961.02.21 - resigned 1975), died 1978
- Joseph Devellerez Thaung Shwe (2 October 1975 - 3 December 2010 resigned), died 2015
  - Auxiliary Bishop Gregory Taik Maung (1984.11.08 – 2010.07.16 )
- Apostolic Administrator sede plena the above Gregory Taik Maung (1991 – 2010.07.16 resigned because of ill health); the diocese was overseen from July 2010 to December 2010 by a neighboring Archbishop
- Alexander Pyone Cho (3 December 2010 – 3 December 2024 retired)
- Peter Tin Wai (3 December 2024 – Present)

== See also ==
- Catholic Church in Burma

== Sources and external links ==
- GCatholic
