= Archdiocese of Taunggyi =

Latin Catholic archdiocese in Myanmar

Coordinates: 20.7802°N 97.0388°E

Archdiocese of Taunggyi Archidioecesis Taunggyiensis
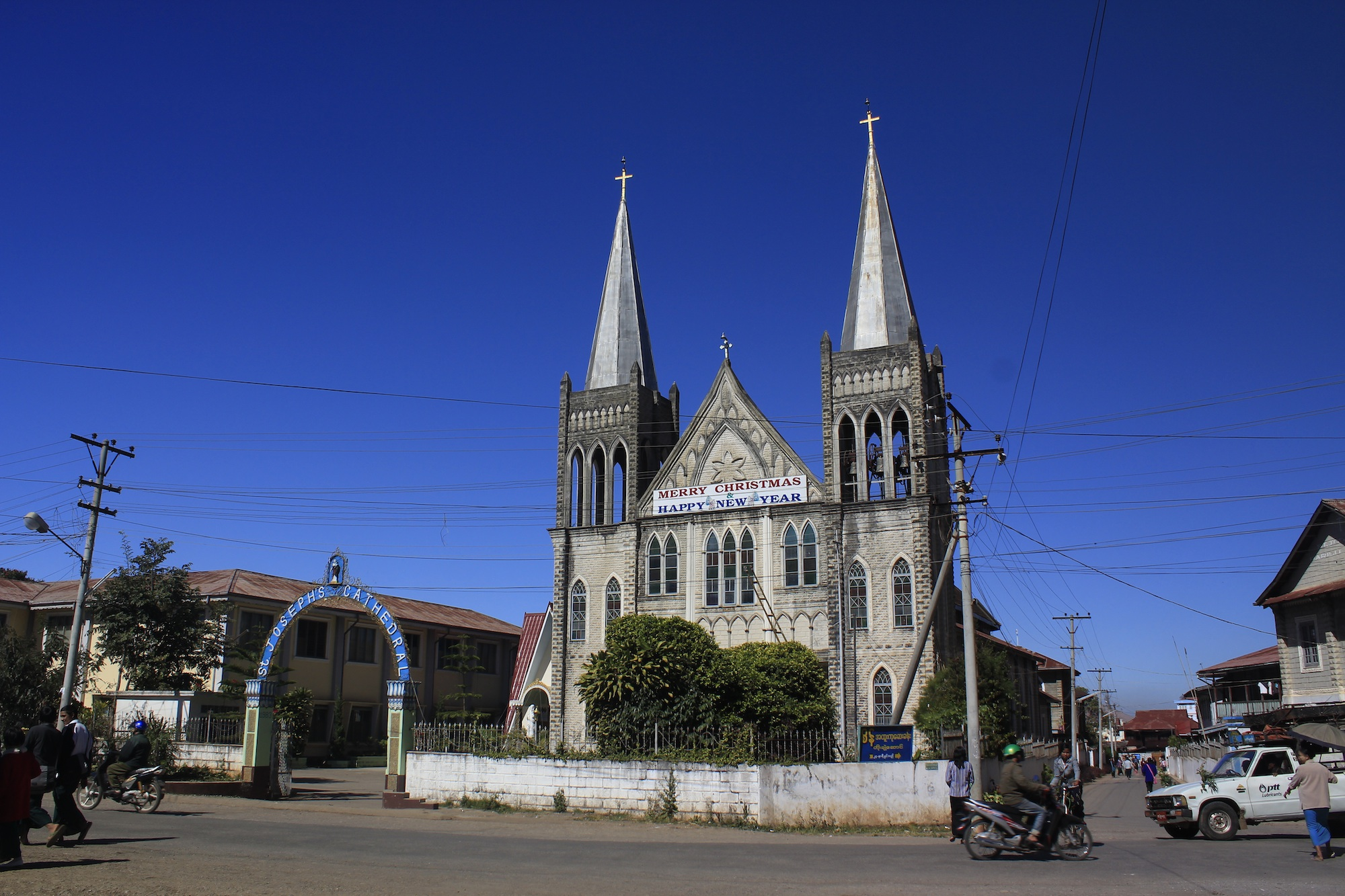
- St. Joseph's Cathedral in Taunggyi

Location
- Country: Myanmar
- Ecclesiastical province: Taunggyi

Statistics
- Area: 26,850 km^{2} (10,370 sq mi)
- Population: Total; Catholics: (as of 2010); 1,615,000; 7,389 (0.5%)

Information
- Denomination: Catholic
- Sui iuris church: Latin Church
- Rite: Roman Rite
- Established: 21 March 1961 (As Diocese of Taunggyi); 17 January 1998 (As Archdiocese of Taunggyi)
- Cathedral: St. Joseph's Cathedral in Taunggyi

Current leadership
- Pope: Leo XIV
- Archbishop: Basilio Athai
- Suffragans: Diocese of Kengtung; Diocese of Loikaw; Diocese of Pekhon; Diocese of Taungngu

The Archdiocese of Taunggyi (Latin: Archidioecesis Taunggyiensis) is a Latin Catholic archdiocese of the Catholic Church located in the Shan State of Myanmar. The dioceses of Kengtung, Loikaw, Pekhon and Taungngu are suffragans of the archdiocese. The cathedral of the archdiocese is St. Joseph's Cathedral in Taunggyi.

The diocese of Taunggyi was created on March 21, 1961, by splitting from the diocese of Taungoo, and was a suffragan of the Archdiocese of Yangon. When the diocese was elevated to become an archdiocese and metropolitan see on January 17, 1998, Kentung (from Mandalay) and Loikaw and Taungoo (from Yangon) were assigned to the new ecclesiastical province. The Diocese of Pekhon was created on December 15, 2005, by splitting off the southern part of the archdiocese.

After the split, the archdiocese has 7,350 Catholics out of a total population of 1.5 million. It is subdivided into 12 parishes, and has a total number of 25 priests. It covers an area of 26,850 square kilometres (10,370 sq mi).

== Bishops ==
- Basilio Athai, since June 24, 2016, had been auxiliary bishop since June 28, 2008
- Matthias U Shwe, December 18, 1989 - April 12, 2015 (retired), had been auxiliary bishop since December 20, 1979, died August 12, 2021
- Giovanni Battista Gobbato, P.I.M.E., March 21, 1961 - December 18, 1989 (retired)

=== Auxiliary bishops ===
- Peter Hla, auxiliary bishop from March 13, 2001, till December 15, 2005 (became bishop of Pekhon)
- Basilio Athai (2008 – 2016)
