= Diocese of Hakha =

Latin Catholic diocese in Myanmar

Coordinates: 22.6397°N 93.6068°E

Diocese of Hakha Dioecesis Hakhanensis ဟားခါးကက်သလစ်ခရစ်ယာန်ဂိုဏ်းအုပ်ပိုင်သောနယ်

Location
- Country: Myanmar
- Ecclesiastical province: Mandalay
- Metropolitan: Mandalay

Statistics
- Area: 27,516 km^{2} (10,624 sq mi)
- Population: Total; Catholics: (as of 2010); 485,247; 31,624 (6.5%)

Information
- Denomination: Catholic
- Sui iuris church: Latin Church
- Rite: Roman Rite
- Established: 21 November 1992
- Cathedral: Cathedral of St Joseph in Hakha

Current leadership
- Pope: Leo XIV
- Bishop: Lucius Hre Kung Bishop-elect
- Metropolitan Archbishop: Archbishop Nicolas Mang Thang

The Diocese of Hakha (Latin: Dioecesis Hakhanensis, Burmese: ဟားခါးကက်သလစ်ခရစ်ယာန်ဂိုဏ်းအုပ်ပိုင်သောနယ်) is a Latin Catholic diocese of the Catholic Church in Burma, located in the Chin State and the Sagaing Division in northwestern Myanmar. It is a suffragan diocese of the Archdiocese of Mandalay.

The diocese was created on November 21, 1992 by splitting off the territory from the archdiocese of Mandalay.

The diocese covers an area of 27,516 km². It is subdivided into 31 parishes. 31,624 of the 485,247 people in the area belong to the Catholic Church, 76% of the population belong to the Protestant church.

== List of bishops ==
- Nicholas Mang Thang, (November 21, 1992 - November 30, 2011)
- Lucius Hre Kung, (appointed bishop 19 October 2013)
