= Diocese of Loikaw =

Latin Catholic diocese in Myanmar

Coordinates: 19.6856°N 97.2102°E

Diocese of Loikaw Dioecesis Loikavensis

Location
- Country: Myanmar
- Ecclesiastical province: Taunggyi
- Metropolitan: Taunggyi

Statistics
- Area: 11,730 km^{2} (4,530 sq mi)
- Population: Total; Catholics: (as of 2023); 304,150; 91,773 (30.2%)
- Parishes: 40

Information
- Denomination: Catholic Church
- Sui iuris church: Latin Church
- Rite: Roman Rite
- Established: 14 November 1988; 37 years ago
- Cathedral: Christ the King Cathedral in Loikaw
- Secular priests: 102 (89 Diocesan, 13 Religious Orders)

Current leadership
- Pope: Leo XIV
- Bishop: Celso Ba Shwe
- Metropolitan Archbishop: Basilio Athai
- Bishops emeritus: Sotero Phamo

The Diocese of Loikaw (Lat: Diocesis Loikavensis) is a Latin Catholic diocese of the Catholic Church in Burma.

Erected in 1988, the diocese was created from the Archdiocese of Taunggyi, and remains a suffragan of the parent.

== Ordinaries ==
Bishops of Loikaw (Roman Rite)

- Sotero Phamo (Thein Myint) (14 November 1988 – 26 April 2014), resigned
  - Apostolic Administrator Stephen Tjephe (26 April 2014 – 15 November 2014), Auxiliary Bishop of Loikaw
- Stephen Tjephe (15 November 2014 – 16 December 2020)
  - Apostolic Administrator Celso Ba Shwe (17 December 2020 – 29 March 2023)
- Celso Ba Shwe (29 March 2023 – Present)

Auxiliary Bishop of Loikaw

- Stephen Tjephe (2009-2014)

Other Priests of this diocese who became Bishops

- Basilio Athai (1988-2008), appointed Auxiliary Bishop of Taunggyi
- Bernardino Ne Ne (1995-2026), appointed Coadjutor Bishop of Taungngu

== See also ==
- Catholic Church in Burma
