= Diocese of Taungngu (Catholic) =

Latin Catholic diocese in Myanmar

Coordinates: 18.9442°N 96.4412°E

Diocese of Taungngu Dioecesis Tunguensis
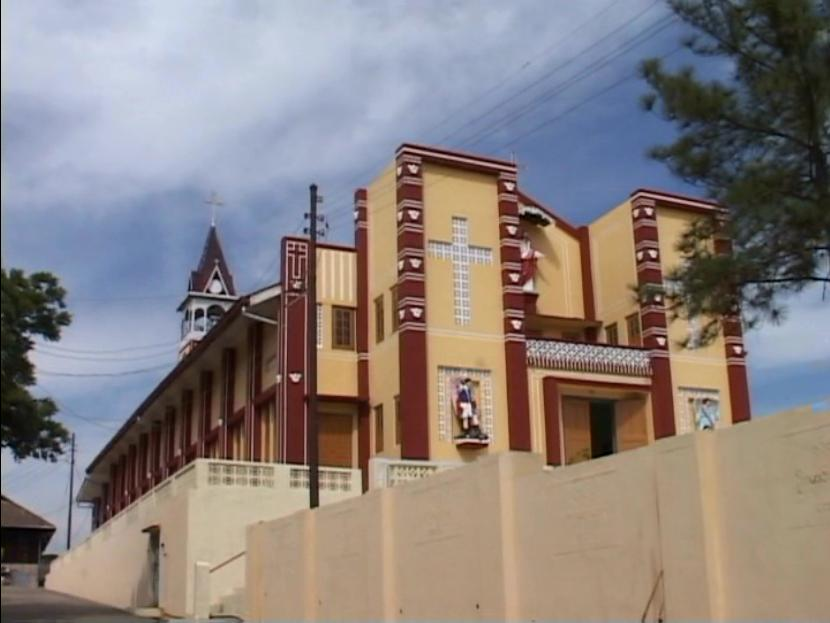
- Sacred Heart Cathedral

Location
- Country: Myanmar
- Ecclesiastical province: Taunggyi

Statistics
- Area: 49,600 km^{2} (19,200 sq mi)
- Population: Total; Catholics: (as of 2022); 3,598,000; 43,465 (1.2%)
- Parishes: 22

Information
- Denomination: Catholic Church
- Sui iuris church: Latin Church
- Rite: Roman Rite
- Established: 19 July 1870 (As Vicariate Apostolic of Eastern Burma); 27 April 1927 (As Vicariate Apostolic of Toungoo); 1 January 1955 (As Diocese of Toungoo); 31 July 1996 (As Diocese of Taungngu)
- Cathedral: Cathedral of the Sacred Heart in Taungoo

Current leadership
- Pope: Leo XIV
- Bishop: John Saw Gawdy
- Metropolitan Archbishop: Basilio Athai
- Bishops emeritus: Isaac Danu

The Diocese of Taungngu (Lat: Diocesis Tunguensis) is a Latin Catholic diocese of the Catholic Church in Taungoo, Myanmar. The current bishop is John Saw Gawdy, appointed in 2023.

== History ==
Erected in 1870, the diocese has the distinction of being one of the oldest in all of Myanmar. Originally established as the Apostolic Vicariate of Eastern Burma, in 1927 the Vicariate was subdivided, and the Apostolic Prefecture of Kentung established. The Prefecture would eventually become the Diocese of Kengtung. At the same time, the old Vicariate was renamed the Apostolic Vicariate of Toungoo.

In 1955, the Vicariate was elevated to a full diocese. In 1961, the diocese would be again subdivided, and the diocese of Taunggyi, the future Archdiocese of Taunggyi established.

Finally in 1996, the diocese was renamed to the diocese of Taungngu. The diocese is currently suffragan to the Archdiocese of Taunggyi.

== Ordinaries ==
=== Vicariate Apostolic of Eastern Burma ===
- Eugenio Biffi, P.I.M.E. (1867 Appointed – 7 February 1882) Appointed Bishop of Cartagena
- Tancredi Conti (12 February 1882 Appointed – )
- Rocco Tornatore (18 November 1889 Appointed – 1908 Died)
- Vittorio Emanuele Sagrada (10 May 1908 Appointed – 27 April 1927 see below)

=== Vicariate Apostolic of Toungoo ===
- Vittorio Emanuele Sagrada (27 April 1927 see above – 1936 Retired)
- Alfredo Lanfranconi (1 July 1937 Appointed – 1 January 1955 see below)

=== Diocese of Toungoo ===
- Alfredo Lanfranconi (1 January 1955 see above – 26 November 1959 Died)
- Sebastian U Shwe Yauk (21 March 1961 Appointed – 13 July 1988 Died)
- Isaac Danu (1 September 1989 Appointed – 31 July 1996 see below)

=== Diocese of Taungngu ===
- Isaac Danu (31 July 1996 see above – 16 July 2023)
- John Saw Gawdy (16 July 2023 succeeded – present)

== See also ==
- Catholic Church in Burma
