= Archdiocese of Mandalay =

Latin Catholic archdiocese in Myanmar

Archdiocese of Mandalay Archidioecesis Mandalayensis မန္တလေးဂိုဏ်းချုပ်
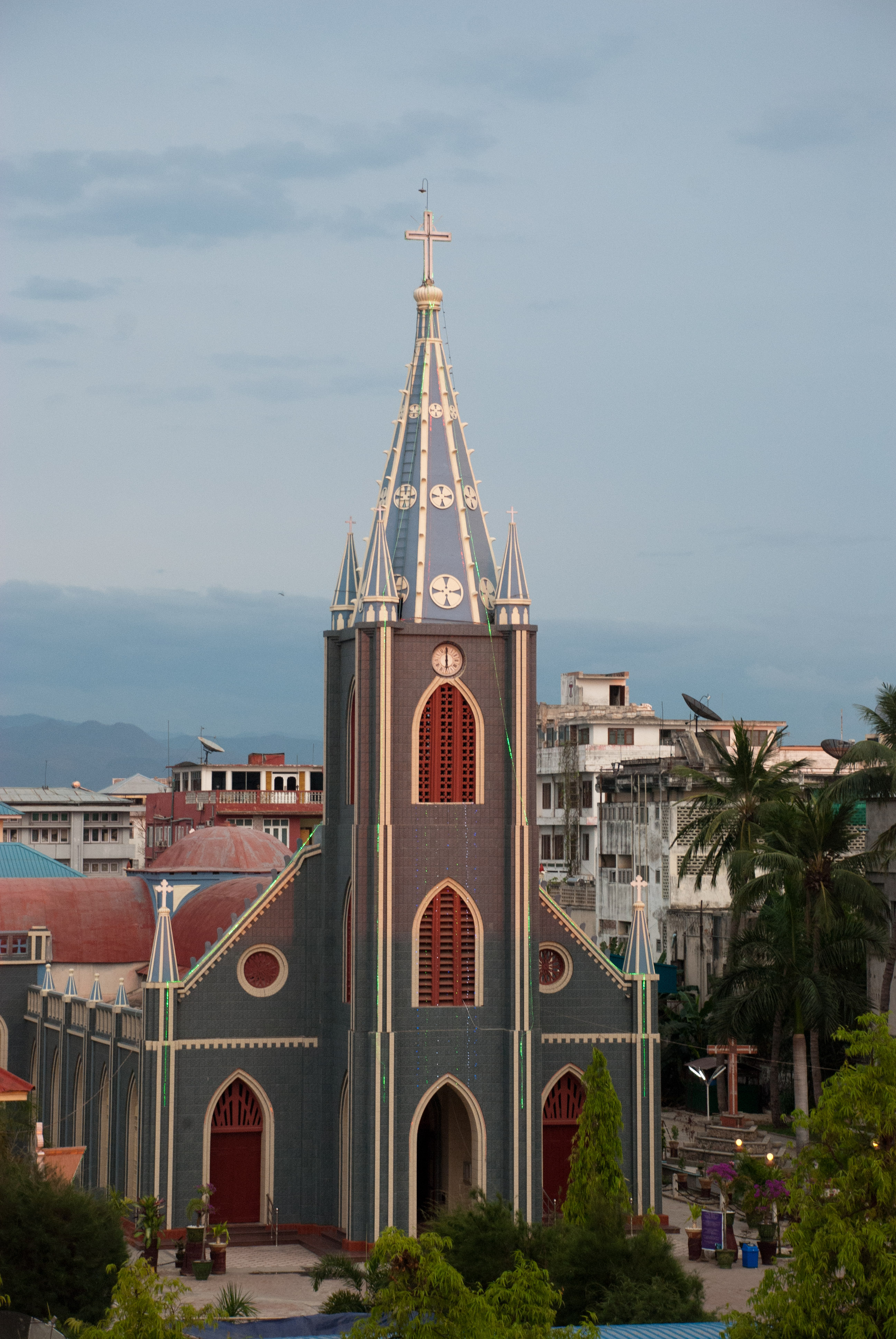
- Cathedral of the Sacred Heart in Mandalay

Location
- Country: Myanmar
- Ecclesiastical province: Mandalay

Statistics
- Area: 212,407 km^{2} (82,011 sq mi)
- Population: Total; Catholics: (as of 2004); 15,000,000; 23,617 (0.2%)
- Parishes: 30

Information
- Denomination: Catholic
- Sui iuris church: Latin Church
- Rite: Roman Rite
- Established: 27 November 1866; Vicariate Apostolic of Central Burma; 19 July 1870; Vicariate Apostolic of Northern Burma; 5 January 1939; Vicariate Apostolic of Mandalay; 1 January 1955; Archdiocese of Mandalay
- Cathedral: Sacred Heart Cathedral in Mandalay

Current leadership
- Pope: Leo XIV
- Archbishop: Marco Tin Win
- Suffragans: Diocese of Banmaw; Diocese of Hakha; Diocese of Kalay; Diocese of Lashio; Diocese of Myitkyina
- Bishops emeritus: Nicholas Mang Thang

Website
- mandalayarchdiocese.com

TheArchdiocese of Mandalay is a Latin Catholic ecclesiastical jurisdiction of the Catholic CHurch located in the central part of Myanmar. It covers about 212,407 square kilometres (82,011 sq mi) and comprises the southern part of Sagaing Region, almost the whole Mandalay Region and the eastern part of Magwe Region. The archdiocese has the suffragan dioceses of Myitkyina, Banmaw, Lashio and Hakha. Most of the Burmese people are Buddhist. A few are Muslims and Hindus. Ethnic groups in the city include Myanmar, Kayin, Karen, Tamil and Chinese. The language used in the diocesan territory is Burmese.

== Ordinaries ==
Marco Tin Win was installed as archbishop on 23 June 2019.

- Bourdon (1872–1887)
- Simon (1888–1893)
- Usse (1893–1902)
- Cardos (1902–1906)
- Foulquier (1906–1930)
- Joseph U Win (1955–1965)
- Aloysius U Ba Khin (1965–1978)
- Alphonse U Than Aung (1978–2002)
- Paul Zingtung Grawng (2003–2014)
- Nicholas Mang Thang (2014–2019)
- Marco Tin Win (2019–present)

== Statistics ==
As of 2004, Mandalay diocese had 22,511 Catholics in 30 parishes, representing 00.2% of the 15 million people in Mandalay, Sagaing and Magwe Regions.
