= Diocese of Myitkyina (Catholic) =

Latin Catholic ecclesiastical jurisdiction in Burma

Diocese of Myitkyina Dioecesis Myitkyinaensis
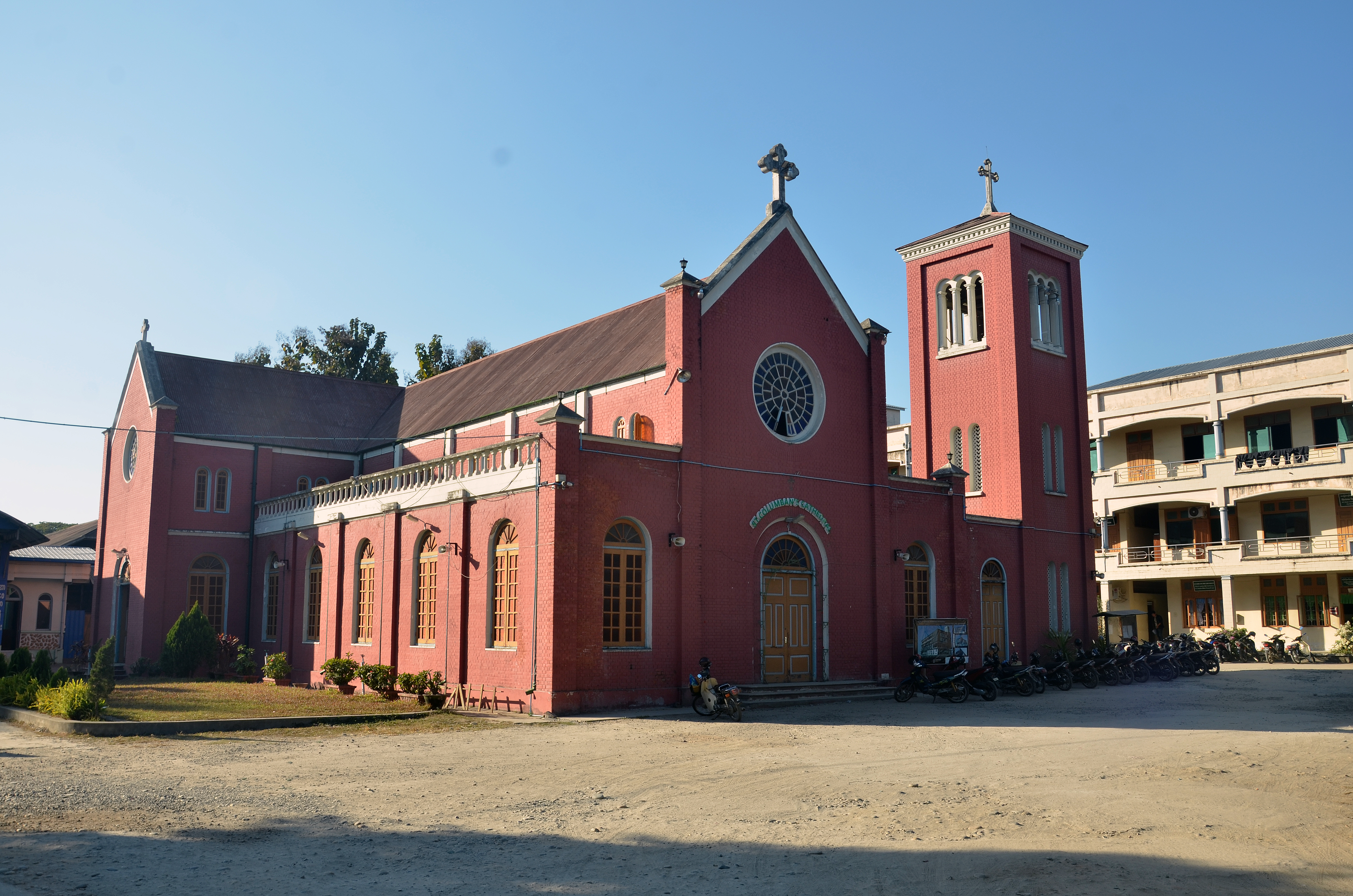
- St. Columban Cathedral, Myitkyina Diocese, Kachin State, Myanmar

Location
- Country: Myanmar
- Ecclesiastical province: Mandalay
- Metropolitan: Mandalay
- Coordinates: 25.3820°N 97.3953°E

Statistics
- Area: 26,120 km^{2} (10,080 sq mi)
- Population: Total; Catholics: (as of 2006); +2,000,000; 86,550 (4.7%)
- Congregations: 13

Information
- Denomination: Catholic Church
- Sui iuris church: Latin Church
- Rite: Roman Rite
- Established: 5 January 1939 (As Prefecture Apostolic of Bhamo); 21 February 1961 (As Diocese of Myitkyina)
- Cathedral: St Columban's Cathedral in Myitkyina
- Patron saint: Columban
- Secular priests: 47

Current leadership
- Pope: Leo XIV
- Bishop: John Mung-ngawn La Sam
- Metropolitan Archbishop: Marco Tin Win

The Diocese of Myitkyina (Lat: Dioecesis Myitkyinaensis) is a Latin Catholic diocese of the Catholic Church in Burma. Erected in 1939 as the Apostolic Prefecture of Bhamo, the prefecture was created from territory in the Apostolic Vicariate of Northern Burma. In 1961, the Prefecture was elevated to a full diocese, suffragan to the Archdiocese of Mandalay. The current bishop is Francis Daw Tang, appointed in 2004. Currently the Diocese manages numerous churches, schools and clinics throughout Kachin State.

== Pre-History ==
Before the Diocese was fully established, the first footprints of Catholicism in Myitkyina were set in 1856, when French Bishop Paul Bigandet M.E.P. visited the northern region of Burma. Seventeen years later, in 1873, a trio of priests was dispatched to begin the early works of the Diocese. According to internal historical records, three decades of extreme sicknesses caused by malaria brought the work to a stand-still.

Between the years 1873 to 1901, 14 priests either died or returned wrecked in health. The mission was slow to spread throughout Kachin populations in the early 20th century until the arrival of the first Columban Missionaries from Ireland in 1936.

== History ==
With "Divine Providence" re-instated in the architects of Catholicism in Kachin State, evangelization was resumed with "renewed vigour and fresh hopes" and by 1965 and 1966, the diocese was handed over to the local clergy.

Throughout the 1960s and to this day, the Diocese of Myitkyina has been bringing gospel and aid to isolated and hazardous locations in Northern Myanmar.

== Ordinaries ==
- Patrizio Usher, S.S.C.M.E. (7 January 1939 Appointed - 1958 Died)
- John James Howe, S.S.C.M.E. (18 July 1959 Appointed - 9 December 1976 Resigned)
- Paul Zingtung Grawng (9 December 1976 Appointed - 24 May 2003 Appointed, Archbishop of Mandalay) Grawng is credited as being the first Kachin priest to be ordained as a priest in 1965.
- Francis Daw Tang (3 December 2004 Appointed - 18 November 2020 Resigned)
- John Mung-ngawn La Sam (29 October 2024 – present)

== See also ==
- Catholic Church in Burma
