= List of Catholic dioceses in Chad =

The Roman Catholic Church in Chad is composed of 1 ecclesiastical province with 6 suffragan dioceses.

== List of Dioceses ==
=== Episcopal Conference of Chad ===
==== Ecclesiastical Province of N'Djamena ====
- Archdiocese of N'Djamena
  - Diocese of Doba
  - Diocese of Goré
  - Diocese of Lai
  - Diocese of Moundou
  - Diocese of Pala
  - Diocese of Sarh

=== Immediately subject to the Holy See ===
- Apostolic Vicariate of Mongo
