= Jean Miguina =

Chadian Catholic prelate (born 1978)

The Most Reverend Jean Miguina O.F.M.Cap.
- Bishop-Elect of Sarh, Chad
- Church: Catholic Church
- Archdiocese: Roman Catholic Archdiocese of N'Djaména
- See: Diocese of Sarh
- Appointed: 16 July 2026
- Installed: 17 October 2026 (Expected)
- Predecessor: Miguel Ángel Sebastián Martínez M.C.C.I. (10 October 2018 – 16 July 2026)
- Successor: Incumbent

Orders
- Ordination: 21 November 2009
- Consecration: 17 October 2026 (Expected)

Personal details
- Born: Jean Miguina; 12 September 1978 (age 48) Laï, Diocese of Laï, Tandjilé, Chad
- Motto: Ad Iesum Christum in pace et gaudio ("To Jesus Christ in peace and joy")

−

Styles of Jean Miguina
- Reference style: His Grace; The Most Reverend
- Spoken style: Your Grace
- Religious style: Bishop

Jean Miguina O.F.M. Cap. (born 12 September 1978) is a Chadian Catholic prelate who was appointed bishop of the Roman Catholic Diocese of Sarh, in Chad on 16 July 2026. Before that, from 21 November 2009 until he was appointed bishop, he served as a priest for the Order of Friars Minor Capuchin, a Catholic clerical male religious order, of which he is a professed member. He was appointed bishop by Pope Leo XIV. He is scheduled to receive his episcopal consecration on 17 October 2026.

== Background and education ==
He was born on 12 September 1978 at Laï, Diocese of Laï, Tandjilé, Chad. He studied philosophy and theology at seminary before he was ordained a priest. He holds a Licentiate in canon law awarded by the Pontifical University of the Holy Cross in Rome, Italy. In 2020 he graduated with a Master's degree and in 2024 with a Doctorate in human rights and humanitarian action from the Catholic University of Central Africa, in Yaoundé, Cameroon.

== Priest ==
While at seminary, he became a member of the Order of Friars Minor Capuchin. He was ordained a priest of his religious order at Moundou, Chad on 21 November 2009. He served as a priest until 16 July 2026. While a priest, he served in various roles and locations, including:

- Regional assistant for Franciscan youth of Bangui, Central African Republic from 2009 until 2012.
- Studies in Rome, Italy at the Pontifical University of the Holy Cross, leading to the award of a licentiate in canon law from 2013 until 2015.
- Lecturer and director of the Saint Laurent University Institute in Bouar, Central African Republic from 2016 until 2019.
- Secretary of the Conference of Capuchin Major Superiors of Central and West Africa from 2016 until 2019.
- Custos of Friars Minor Capuchin of Chad and Central Africa from 2019 until 2022.
- President of the Conference of Capuchin Major Superiors of Central and West Africa from 2019 until 2022.
- Studies at the Catholic University of Central Africa in Yaoundé, Cameroon, leading to the award of a master's degree in 2020 and a doctorate in 2024, in human rights and humanitarian action.
- Member of the College of Consultors of the Diocese of Moundou in Chad from 2024 until 2026.
- Spiritual assistant to the Franciscan Sisters of Donia, Chad from 2024 until 2026.
- Instructor of Latin at Saint Mbaga Tuzinde Major Seminary in Sarh, Chad from 2024 until 2026.
- Prelate responsible for Capuchin Aspirants in Chad from 2024 until 2026.
- Counsellor and Custos of the Custody of Chad and the Central African Republic, in the Capuchin Order from 2024 until 2026.
- Member of the Legal Commission within the Capuchin Order from 2024 until 2026.

== Bishop ==
On 16 July 2026, Pope Leo XIV accepted the age-related retirement request of Bishop Miguel Ángel Sebastián Martínez of the Diocese of Sarh in Chad. That same day, the Holy Father appointed Monsignor Jean Miguina as his successor.

== See also ==
- Catholic Church in Chad

== Succession table ==
Catholic Church titles
Preceded by Miguel Ángel Sebastián Martínez (10 October 2018 – 16 July 2026)	Bishop of Sarh (since 16 July 2026)	Succeeded by (Bishop-Elect)
