= Diocese of Goré =

Roman Catholic diocese in Chad

Diocese of Goré Dioecesis Gorensis Diocèse de Goré

Location
- Country: Chad
- Metropolitan: Archdiocese of N'Djaména
- Headquarters: Goré, Logone Oriental, Chad

Statistics
- Area: 21,000 km^{2} (8,100 sq mi)
- Population: Total; Catholics: (as of 2023); 344,000; 104,099 (30.3%)
- Parishes: 8

Information
- Denomination: Catholic Church
- Sui iuris church: Latin Church
- Rite: Roman Rite
- Established: 28 November 1998; 27 years ago
- Secular priests: 24 (9 Diocesan, 15 Religious Orders)

Current leadership
- Pope: Leo XIV
- Bishop: Rosario Pio Ramolo, O.F.M. Cap.
- Metropolitan Archbishop: Edmond Jitangar

Map
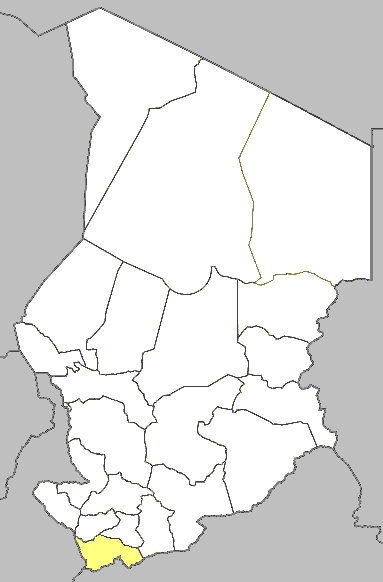

The Roman Catholic Diocese of Goré (Latin: Goren(sis)) is a diocese in Goré in the ecclesiastical province of N'Djamena in Chad.

== History ==
- 28 November 1998: Established as Diocese of Goré from the Diocese of Doba and Diocese of Moundou

== Leadership ==
=== Bishop of Goré ===
- Rosario Pio Ramolo, O.F.M. Cap. (28 November 1998 – Present)

== See also ==
Roman Catholicism in Chad

== Sources ==
- GCatholic.org
