= Miguel Ángel Sebastián Martínez =

Spanish-born Chadian Roman Catholic bishop (born 1950)

His Excellency, The Most Reverend Miguel Ángel Sebastián Martínez M.C.C.J.
- Bishop Emeritus of Sarh
- Church: Roman Catholic Church
- Diocese: Sarh
- Appointed: 10 October 2018
- Term ended: 16 July 2026
- Predecessor: Edmond Jitangar
- Successor: Jean Miguina
- Other post: Apostolic Administrator of Doba (2014–2017)
- Previous post: Bishop of Lai (1999–2018)

Orders
- Ordination: 7 June 1975
- Consecration: 14 February 1999 by Matthias N'Gartéri Mayadi

Personal details
- Born: 28 September 1950 (age 76) Zaragoza, Spain
- Motto: Dominus tecum

Miguel Ángel Sebastián Martínez, M.C.C.J. (born 28 September 1950) is a Spanish-born Chadian Roman Catholic prelate and member of the Comboni Missionaries of the Heart of Jesus. He served as Bishop of Lai from 1999 to 2018 and as Bishop of Sarh from 2018 until his retirement in 2026.

== Early life and ministry ==
Sebastián Martínez was born on 28 September 1950 in Zaragoza, Spain. He entered the Comboni Missionaries of the Heart of Jesus and was ordained a priest on 7 June 1975.

He spent much of his priestly ministry as a missionary in Chad.

== Episcopal ministry ==
On 28 November 1998, Pope John Paul II appointed Sebastián Martínez the first bishop of the newly erected Diocese of Lai. His episcopal consecration took place on 14 February 1999. The principal consecrator was Bishop Matthias N'Gartéri Mayadi, with Bishops Edmond Jitangar and Michele Russo serving as co-consecrators.

From 30 January 2014 until 18 February 2017, he also served as apostolic administrator of the Diocese of Doba.

On 10 October 2018, Pope Francis transferred him from Laï to the Diocese of Sarh. He was installed on 10 November 2018.

On 16 July 2026, Pope Leo XIV accepted his resignation upon reaching the canonical retirement age of 75 and appointed Capuchin priest Jean Miguina as his successor.
