= Jean-Claude Bouchard =

Canadian priest (born 1940)

Jean-Claude Bouchard O.M.I.
- Bishop Emeritus of Pala
- Church: Catholic Church
- Diocese: Diocese of Pala
- In office: 26 February 1977 – 25 September 2020
- Predecessor: Georges-Hilaire Dupont
- Successor: Dominique Tinoudji

Orders
- Ordination: 30 August 1969 by Louis Levesque
- Consecration: 1 May 1977 by Joachim N'Dayen

Personal details
- Born: 25 September 1940 (age 86) Saint-Éloi, Quebec, Canada, British Empire

Jean-Claude Bouchard (born 25 September 1940 in Saint-Éloi, Quebec) is a Canadian clergyman and bishop for the Roman Catholic Diocese of Pala. He became ordained in 1969. He was appointed bishop in 1977. He retired in 2020.
