= Diocese of Lai =

Roman Catholic diocese in Chad

Coordinates: 9.3929°N 16.2961°E

Diocese of Laï Dioecesis Laiensis Diocèse de Laï

Location
- Country: Chad
- Metropolitan: Archdiocese of N'Djaména
- Headquarters: Laï, Tandjilé, Chad

Statistics
- Area: 18,045 km^{2} (6,967 sq mi)
- Population: Total; Catholics: (as of 2023); 1,063,000; 171,000 (16.1%)
- Parishes: 17

Information
- Denomination: Catholic Church
- Sui iuris church: Latin Church
- Rite: Roman Rite
- Established: 28 November 1998; 27 years ago
- Cathedral: Cathédrale de la Sainte-Famille in Laï
- Secular priests: 34 (27 Diocesan, 7 Religious Orders)

Current leadership
- Pope: Leo XIV
- Bishop: Nicolas Nadji Bab
- Metropolitan Archbishop: Edmond Jitangar

Map
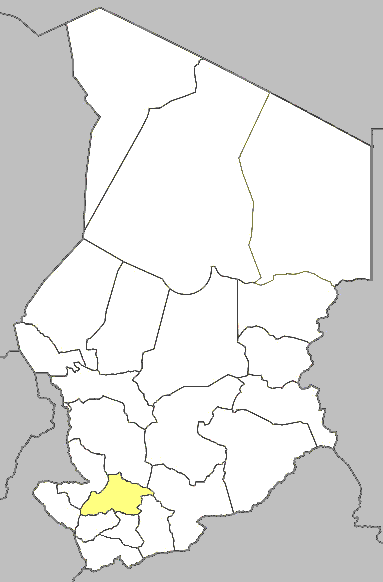

The Roman Catholic Diocese of Laï (Latin: Laien(sis)) is a diocese in Laï in the ecclesiastical province of N'Djamena in Chad.

== History ==
- 28 November 1998: Established as Diocese of Laï from the Diocese of Doba and Diocese of Moundou

== Special churches ==
The pro-cathedral is the Cathédrale de la Sainte-Famille in Laï.

== Leadership ==
=== Bishops of Laï ===
- Miguel Ángel Sebastián Martínez, M.C.C.J. (28 November 1998 – 10 October 2018), appointed Bishop of Sarh
  - Administrator Nicolas Nadji Bab (November 2018 – 14 December 2019), priest of Laï
- Nicolas Nadji Bab (14 December 2019 – Present)

== See also ==
- Roman Catholicism in Chad

== Sources ==
- GCatholic.org
- Catholic Hierarchy
