= Georges-Hilaire Dupont =

Finnish Catholic bishop (1919–2020)

Georges-Hilaire Dupont, O.M.I.
- Bishop of Diocese of Pala
- Church: Roman Catholic Church
- See: Diocese of Pala
- In office: 1964–1975
- Predecessor: Honoré Jouneaux
- Successor: Jean-Claude Bouchards

Orders
- Ordination: 9 May 1943

Personal details
- Born: 16 November 1919; Virey, France
- Died: 29 January 2020 (aged 100); Saint-Hilaire-du-Harcouët, France

Georges-Hilaire Dupont, O.M.I. (16 November 1919 – 29 January 2020) was a French prelate of the Roman Catholic Church.

Dupont was born in Virey, France in November 1919. He was ordained a priest on 9 May 1943 for Missionary Oblates of Mary Immaculate. Dupont was appointed to the Diocese of Pala on 16 January 1964 and consecrated on 1 May 1964. He resigned from the diocese on 28 June 1975. Dupont died in January 2020 at the age of 100.
