= Aïda Yazbeck =

Chadian nun

Sister Aïda Yazbeck
- عيدا يزبك
- Occupations: Catholic nun, social worker, community organizer
- Employer: Archdiocese of N'Djaména
- Organization: Al-Mouna Cultural Center
- Known for: Conflict resolution training

Sister Aïda Yazbeck (Arabic: عيدا يزبك) is a Catholic nun who is the Director of the Al-Mouna Cultural Center in N'Djaména, Chad. Her work focuses on educating international and domestic groups as well as NGOs about conflicts between different groups in Chad. By training people in conflict resolution, Sister Yazbeck's organization seeks to promote respect among culturally different groups and foster peace in all aspects of life.

== Early life ==
Sister Yazbeck originally lived in Mount Lebanon, Jdeidet El Matn, near Beirut. Before moving to Chad, Yazbeck worked for 22 years in university education and was an active member of Caritas Lebanon, where she worked with Palestinian migrants who had been displaced amid wars.

== Activism ==
Sister Yazbeck worked for Caritas Lebanon for 20 years, helping those displaced by wars in the south of the country and Palestinian migrants. Yazbeck is a proud migrant herself, and supports acceptance and integration of migrants, describing the Al-Mouna center as a place that accepts all without exception.

Sister Yazbeck and her foundation have worked with groups outside of Chad to promote conflict resolution. These include the Swiss Embassy in Chad and the Cordoba Peace Institute (CPI) of Geneva, who helped to train the staff of the Cultural Center to understand the religious, environmental, and ethnic conflicts in Chad and how to resolve them peacefully by fostering mutual respect between groups and institutions.

=== COVID-19 Pandemic ===
In April 2020, Sister Yazbeck shifted her efforts to help combat the COVID-19 pandemic. Along with roughly 100 volunteers at the Cultural Center, Yazbeck helped to distribute hand sanitizers, drinks and face masks to those who needed them in the capital. In addition, Yazbeck helped to organize a virtual awareness campaign about ways to mitigate the impact of the pandemic, such as teaching participants hand-washing techniques and the rational management of water. The Al-Mouna Center also worked to train the community in practical matters such as how to create plastic bottle faucets, as running water is not available to all.

Yazbeck notes a lack of government assistance in contrast to the work performed by the center, and advocates for a change of volunteer-mentality in Chad, as she describes a lack of volunteering culture.
