= Apostolic Vicariate of Mongo =

Roman Catholic missionary jurisdiction in Chad

Coordinates: 12.1786°N 18.6808°E

Location
- Country: Chad
- Ecclesiastical province: Exempt, directly subject to the Holy See

Statistics
- Area: 540,000 km^{2} (210,000 sq mi)
- Population: Total; Catholics: (as of 2014); 2,121,000; 5,312 (0.3%)
- Parishes: 6

Information
- Denomination: Catholic Church
- Sui iuris church: Latin Church
- Rite: Roman Rite
- Established: 2001
- Cathedral: Cathédrale Saint-Ignace
- Patron saint: Ignatius of Loyola
- Secular priests: 11

Current leadership
- Pope: Francis

Map
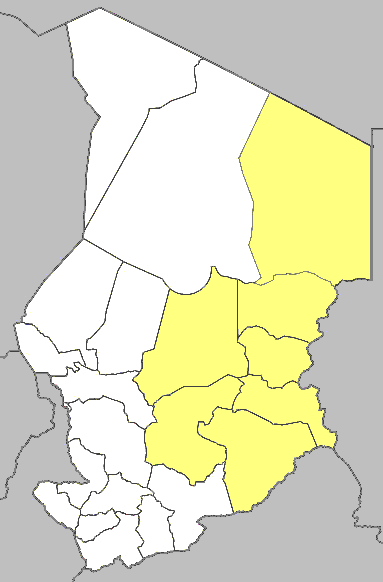

The Apostolic Vicariate of Mongo is a Latin Church pre-diocesan missionary jurisdiction or apostolic vicariate in Sahel-country Chad.

It is immediately exempt to the Holy See, specifically the missionary Congregation for the Evangelization of Peoples, and is not part of any ecclesiastical province.

Its cathedral is the Cathédrale Saint-Ignace, dedicated to Ignatius of Loyola (founder and patron saint of the Society of Jesus), in the episcopal see of Mongo, in Guéra.

== History ==
The jurisdiction was established on 1 December 2001 as the Apostolic Prefecture of Mongo from territory split off from the metropolitan Archdiocese of N'Djaména and from the Diocese of Sarh.

It was promoted on 3 June 2009 as the Apostolic Vicariate of Mongo, and is administered by a titular bishop who acts as ordinary.

== Ordinaries ==
Apostolic Prefect of Mongo

- Henry Coudray, S.J. (1 December 2001 – 3 June 2009 see below)

Apostolic Vicars of Mongo

- Henry Coudray, S.J. (see above 3 June 2009 – 14 December 2020), Titular Bishop of Silli (3 June 2009 – ... )
- Philippe Abbo Chen, N.D.V. (14 December 2020 - ...)

== See also ==
- Catholic Church in Chad
