= Joseph Marie Régis Belzile =

Chadian Canadian Catholic bishop (1931–2018)

Joseph Marie Régis Belzile OFM Cap
- Bishop of Moundou
- Church: Catholic Church
- Diocese: Diocese of Moundou
- In office: 19 December 1974 – 9 March 1985
- Predecessor: Samuel Gaumain
- Successor: Gabriel Régis Balet

Orders
- Ordination: 11 February 1961 by Marie-Joseph Lemieux
- Consecration: 6 April 1975 by Mario Tagliaferri

Personal details
- Born: 13 March 1931 Amqui, Quebec, Dominion of Canada, British Empire
- Died: 4 September 2018 (aged 87) Montreal, Quebec, Canada

Joseph Marie Régis Belzile (13 March 1931 – 4 September 2018) was a Chadian Canadian Roman Catholic bishop.

Belzile was born in Canada and was ordained to the priesthood in 1961. He served as bishop of the Roman Catholic Diocese of Moundou, Chad, from 1975 to 1985.
