= Diocese of Koumra =

Catholic diocese in Chad

Location
- Country: Chad
- Territory: Mandoul Region
- Metropolitan: N'Djaména

Statistics
- Area: 17,330 km^{2} (6,690 sq mi)
- Population: Total; Catholics: (as of 2023); 900,000; 124,083 (4.86%)

Information
- Denomination: Catholic
- Sui iuris church: Latin Church
- Rite: Roman Rite
- Established: August 12, 2023; 2 years ago
- Cathedral: Sainte Thérèse de l'enfant Jésus

Current leadership
- Bishop: Samuel Mbairabé Tibingar
- Metropolitan Archbishop: Edmond Jitangar

Map

The Roman Catholic Diocese of Koumra is a diocese located in Mandoul in the ecclesiastical province of N'Djaména in Chad.

== History ==
The Diocese of Mafinga was established by Pope Francis from the Archdiocese of N'Djaména on August 12, 2023, and Samuel Mbairabé Tibingar was named the first bishop. He was consecrated on November 12, 2023, by Archbishop Edmond Djitangar. The cathedral of the diocese is St. Thérèse of the Child Jesus.
