= Michele Russo (bishop) =

Italian Roman Catholic bishop (1945–2019)

Michele Russo M.C.C.I.
- Bishop of Doba
- Church: Catholic Church
- Diocese: Diocese of Doba
- In office: 6 March 1989 – 30 January 2014
- Predecessor: Diocese erected
- Successor: Martin Waïngue Bani

Orders
- Ordination: 18 March 1970
- Consecration: 21 May 1989 by Matthias N'Gartéri Mayadi

Personal details
- Born: 30 January 1945 San Giovanni Rotondo, Province of Foggia, Kingdom of Italy
- Died: 29 March 2019 (aged 74) Milan, Lombardy, Italy

Michele Russo (30 January 1945 – 30 March 2019) was an Italian Roman Catholic bishop.

== Biography ==
Russo was born in Italy and was ordained to the priesthood in 1970. He served as bishop of the Roman Catholic Diocese of Doba, Chad, from 1989 to 2014.
