= Emi Koussi University =

Private higher education institution in Chad

- Université Emi Koussi
- Motto: Le sommet du savoir
- Type: Private university
- Established: November 2011; 15 years ago
- Location: N'Djamena, Chad; 12.093320°N 15.077795°E
- Website: universite-emikoussi.net

Emi Koussi University or UNEK is a private institution of higher education established since November 2011 by decree of the Ministry of Higher Education of Chad.

UNEK is located in N'Djamena, specifically in the Moursal neighborhood of the 6th arrondissement.

The chairman of the university's board of directors is Allaradi Koné.
