= Charles Vandame =

French Jesuit and Roman Catholic Archbishop of N'Djaména (born 1928)

The Most Reverend Charles Louis Joseph Vandame S.J.
- Archbishop Emeritus of N’Djaména
- Church: Catholic Church
- Archdiocese: Archdiocese of N'Djaména
- Appointed: 23 May 1981
- Term ended: 31 July 2003
- Predecessor: Paul-Pierre-Yves Dalmais
- Successor: Matthias N'Gartéri Mayadi
- Previous post: Priest of the Society of Jesus

Orders
- Ordination: 7 September 1960
- Consecration: 6 January 1982 by Pope John Paul II

Personal details
- Born: 4 June 1928 (age 97) Colombes, France
- Denomination: Catholicism

Charles Louis Joseph Vandame, S.J. (born 4 June 1928) is a French-born Roman Catholic prelate, who served as archbishop of N’Djaména in Chad from 1981 until his retirement in 2003.

== Early life and priesthood ==
Vandame was born on 4 June 1928 in Colombes, France. He entered the Society of Jesus and was ordained a priest on 7 September 1960.

== Episcopal ministry ==
On 23 May 1981, Vandame was appointed Archbishop of N’Djaména. He received episcopal consecration on 6 January 1982 from Pope John Paul II.

During his tenure, he played a leading role in the Catholic Church in Chad and took part in the ad limina visits of Chadian bishops to Rome. In 1994, during one such visit, the bishops addressed issues including evangelization, social challenges and interreligious dialogue in Chad.

On 31 July 2003, his resignation as Archbishop of N’Djaména was accepted by Pope John Paul II upon reaching the age limit. He was succeeded by Matthias N'Gartéri Mayadi.

After his retirement, he held the title of Archbishop Emeritus of N’Djaména.
