= Our Lady of Peace Cathedral, N'Djamena =

Coordinates: 12.1114°N 15.0373°E

Our Lady of Peace Cathedral
- Cathédrale Notre-Dame de la Paix
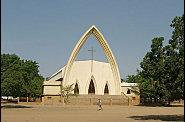
- Our Lady of Peace Cathedral
- Location: N'Djamena
- Country: Chad
- Denomination: Roman Catholic Church

The Our Lady of Peace Cathedral (French: Cathédrale Notre-Dame de la Paix) (Also simply called Cathedral of Our Lady) is the Catholic cathedral of N'Djamena, capital of Chad and seat of the Archdiocese of N'Djamena (Archidioecesis Ndiamenana or L'archidiocèse de N'Djaména). It is located near the Charles de Gaulle Avenue and Avenue Félix Éboué. It was built and inaugurated in 1965 and destroyed on April 21, 1980, during the Civil War. In fact, the city suffered great destruction in 1979 and especially in 1980, when the conflict developed commonly called the war "Tizah chuhur". The current building, which occupies most of the old structures, was rebuilt between 1983 and 1986. In 2013 it was restored again.

== See also ==
- Roman Catholicism in Chad
- Our Lady of Peace Cathedral
