= Diocese of Pala =

Syro Malabar Catholic diocese in Chad

Coordinates: 9.3582°N 14.9027°E

Diocese of pala Dioecesis Palaensis Diocèse de Pala
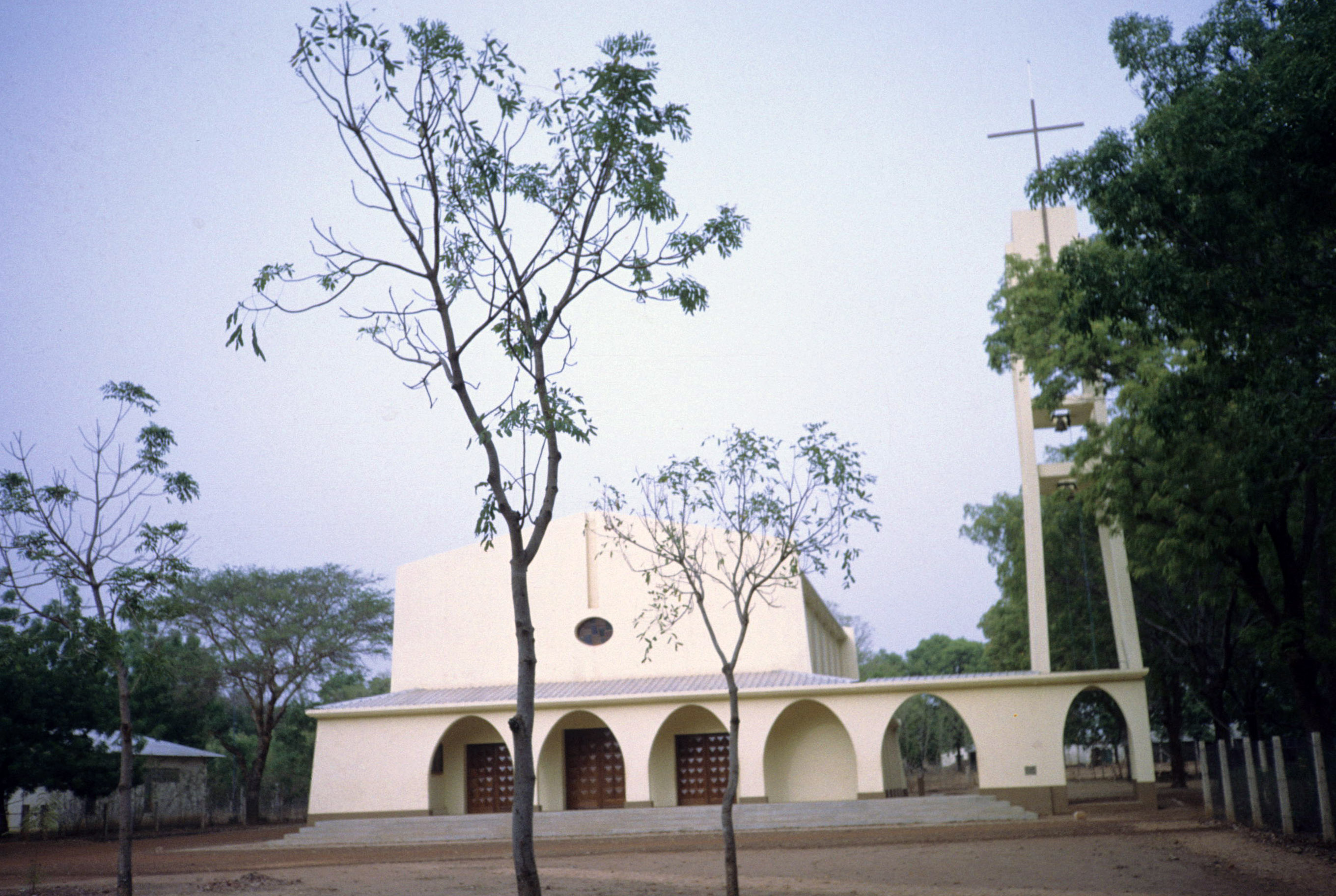
- Sts. Peter & Paul Cathedral in Pala

Location
- Country: Chad
- Metropolitan: Archdiocese of N'Djaména
- Headquarters: Pala, Mayo-Kebbi Ouest, Chad

Statistics
- Population: Total; Catholics: (as of 2023); 30105; 76,330 (3.9%)
- Parishes: 32

Information
- Denomination: Catholic Church
- Sui iuris church: Latin Church
- Rite: Roman Rite
- Established: 19 December 1956; 69 years ago
- Cathedral: Cathédrale Saint-Pierre-et-Saint-Paul de Pala
- Secular priests: 57 (39 Diocesan, 18 Religious Orders)

Current leadership
- Pope: Leo XIV
- Bishop: Dominique Tinoudji
- Metropolitan Archbishop: Edmond Jitangar
- Bishops emeritus: Jean-Claude Bouchard, O.M.I.

The Roman Catholic Archdiocese of Pala (Latin: Palaën(sis)) is a diocese in Pala in the ecclesiastical province of N'Djamena in Chad.

== History ==
- 19 December 1956: Established as Apostolic Prefecture of Pala from the Diocese of Garoua in Cameroon
- 16 January 1964: Promoted as Diocese of Pala

== Leadership ==
Prefect Apostolic of Pala (Roman rite)

- Honoré Jouneaux, O.M.I. (1957 – 1964), resigned

Bishops of Pala (Roman rite)

- Georges-Hilaire Dupont, O.M.I. (16 January 1964 – 28 June 1975), resigned
- Jean-Claude Bouchard, O.M.I. (26 February 1977 – 25 September 2020), retired
- Dominique Tinoudji (3 July 2021 – Present)

== See also ==
Roman Catholicism in Chad

== Sources ==
- GCatholic.org
