= Mbololo =

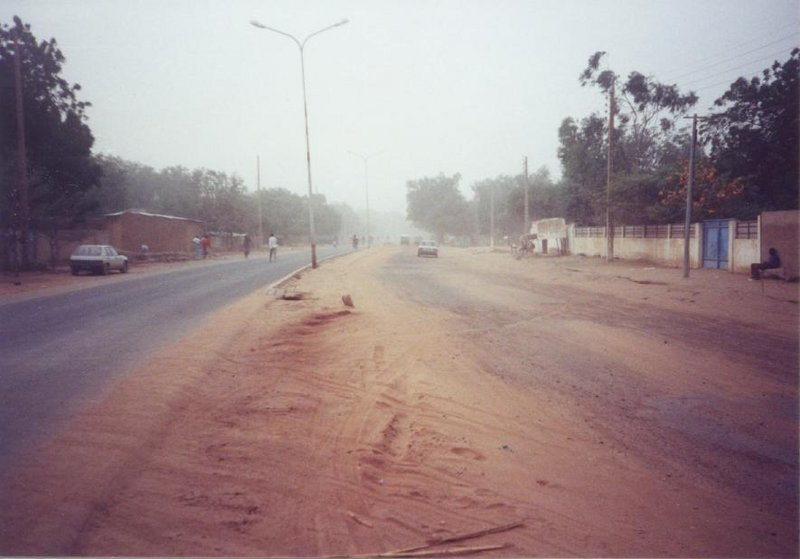

Mbolo (Arabic: مبولو) is a residential district of the city of N'Djamena, the capital of Chad.
