= Virey =

- Part of Saint-Hilaire-du-Harcouët
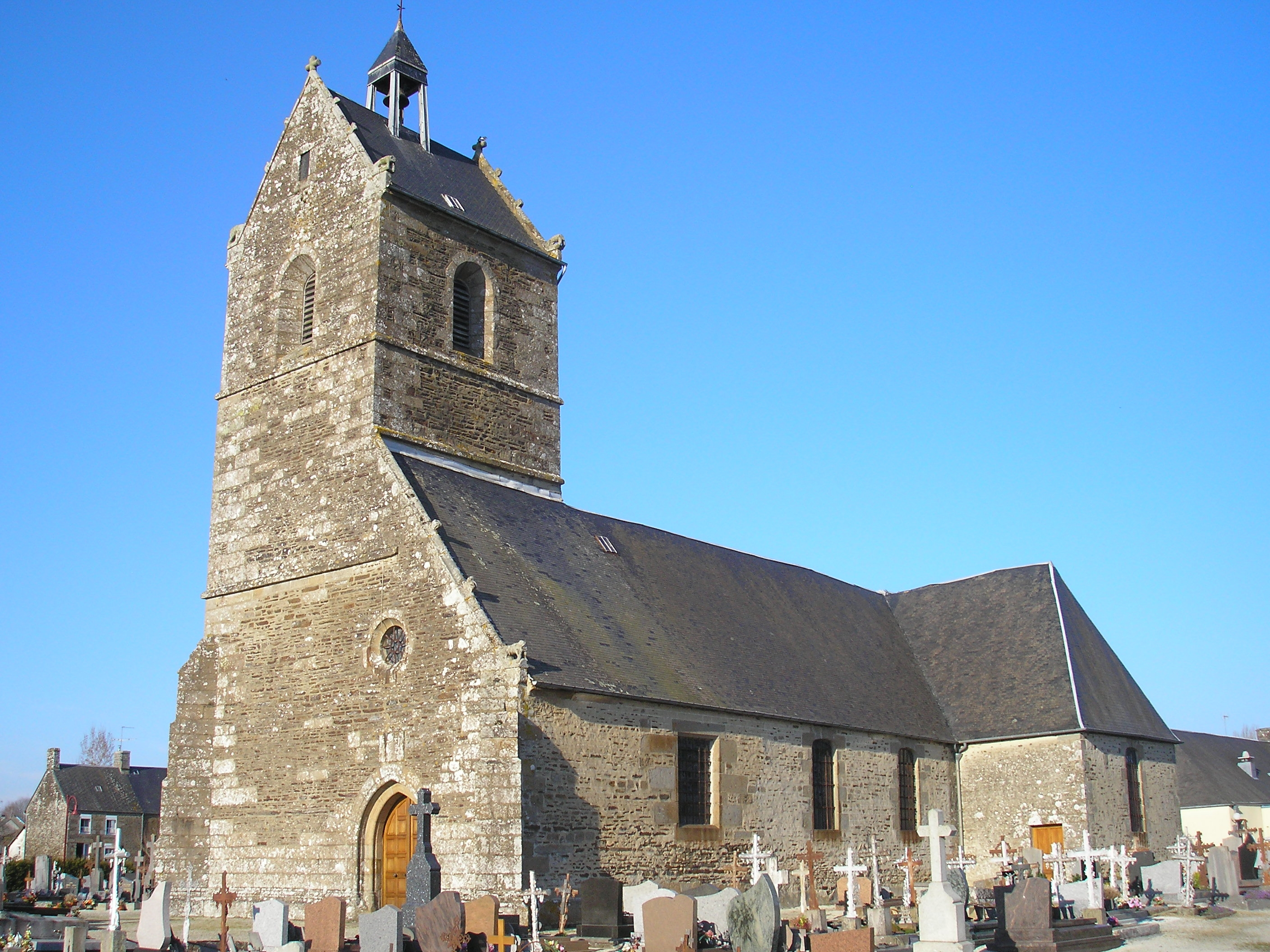
- Saint-Gervais church
- Location of Virey
- Location within France Location within Normandy
- Coordinates: 48°35′07″N 1°07′57″W
- Country: France
- Region: Normandy
- Department: Manche
- Arrondissement: Avranches
- Canton: Saint-Hilaire-du-Harcouët
- Commune: Saint-Hilaire-du-Harcouët
- Area^{1}: 16.94 km^{2} (6.54 sq mi)
- Elevation: 113 m (371 ft)
- Highest elevation: 146 m (479 ft)
- Lowest elevation: 56 m (184 ft)
- Population (2022): 960
  - Density: 57/km^{2} (150/sq mi)
- Time zone: UTC+01:00 (CET)
  - Summer (DST): UTC+02:00 (CEST)
- Postal code: 50600
- ^{1} French Land Register data, which excludes lakes, ponds, glaciers > 1 km^{2} (0.386 sq mi or 247 acres) and river estuaries.

Virey (French pronunciation: [viʁɛ]) is a former commune in the Manche department in Normandy in north-western France. On 1 January 2016, it was merged into the commune of Saint-Hilaire-du-Harcouët.

== See also ==
- Communes of the Manche department
