= Catholic Church in Chad =

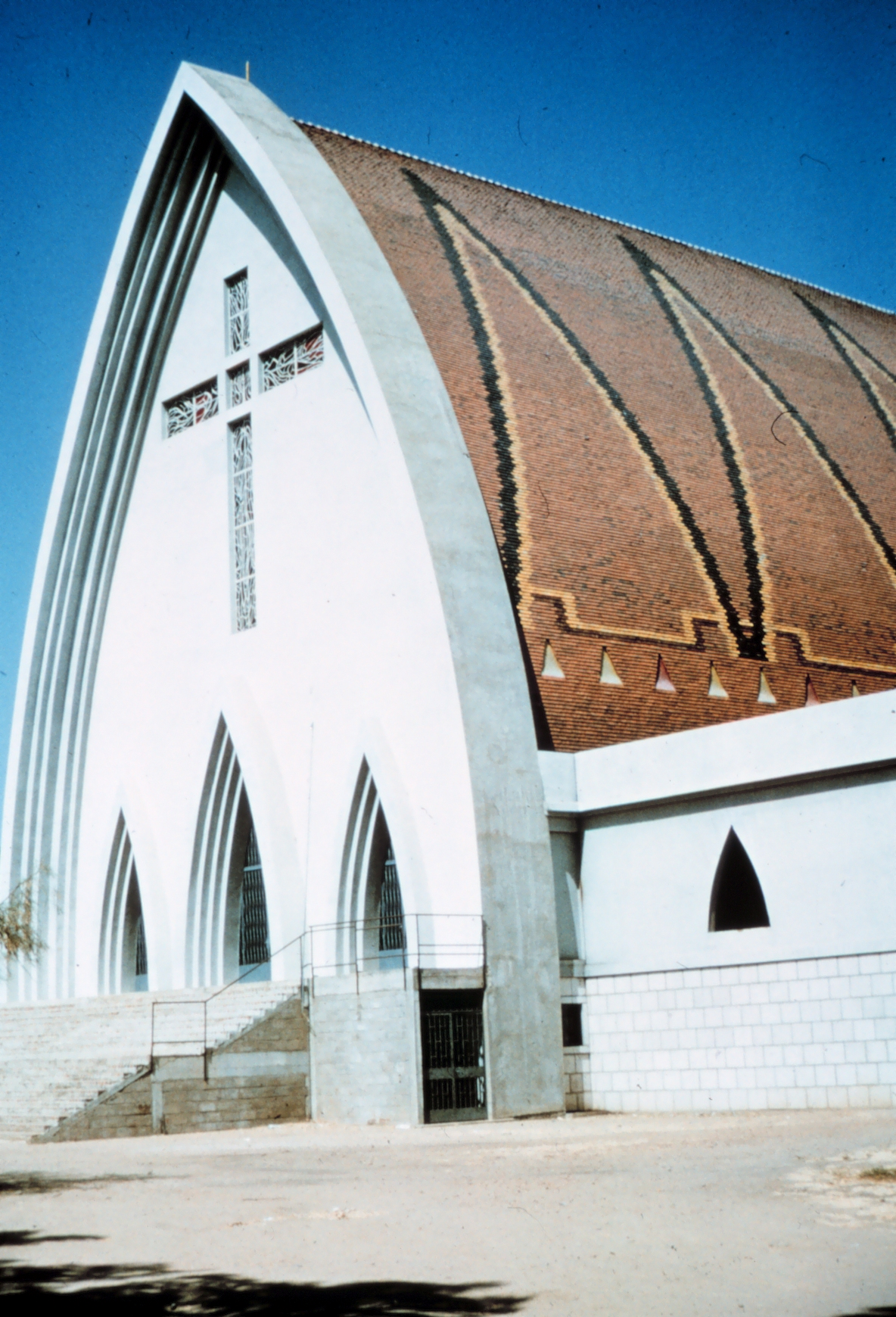
The cathedral in N'Djamena, Chad, as it was before it was severely damaged during the civil war.

The Catholic Church in Chad is part of the worldwide Catholic Church, under the spiritual leadership of the Pope in Rome.

In January 2023, Archbishop Giuseppe Laterza was appointed as the Apostolic Nuncio to Chad.

== Description ==
There are about 3.6 million Catholics in Chad - about one fifth of the total population. The country is divided into seven dioceses and an apostolic vicariate:

- Archdiocese of N'Djamena
  - Diocese of Doba
  - Diocese of Goré
  - Diocese of Lai
  - Diocese of Moundou
  - Diocese of Pala
  - Diocese of Sarh
- Apostolic Vicariate of Mongo (immediately exempt to the Dicastery for Evangelization)

== History ==
Catholic presence is first recorded in 1663 through the work of Capuchin Franciscans, anteceding Protestant missions by more than 200 years, although permanent missions came to Chad later than their Protestant counterparts. Isolated efforts began as early as 1929 when The Holy Ghost Fathers from Bangui founded a mission at Kou, near Moundou in Logone Occidental Prefecture. In 1934, in the midst of the sleeping sickness epidemic, they abandoned Kou for Doba in Logone Oriental Prefecture. Other priests from Ubangi-Chari and Cameroon opened missions in Kélo and Sarh in 1935 and 1939, respectively.

In 1946 these autonomous missions gave way to an institutionalized Catholic presence. This late date had more to do with European politics than with events in Chad. Earlier in the century, the Vatican had designated the Chad region to be part of the Italian vicarate of Khartoum. Rather than risk the implantation of Italian missionaries during the era of Italian dictator Benito Mussolini, the French administration discouraged all Catholic missionary activity. For its part, the Vatican adopted the same tactic, not wishing to upset the Italian regime by transferring jurisdiction of the Chad region to the French. As a consequence of their defeat in World War II, however, the Italians lost their African colonies. This loss cleared the way for a French Catholic presence in Chad, which a decree from Rome formalized on March 22, 1946.

This decree set up three religious jurisdictions that eventually became four bishoprics. The first, administered by the Jesuits, had its seat in N'Djamena. Although its jurisdiction included the eight prefectures in the northern and eastern parts of the country, almost all the Catholics in sahelian and Saharan Chad lived in the capital. The diocese of N'Djamena also served as the archdiocese of all Chad. The second bishopric, at Sarh, also was delegated to the Jesuits. Its region included Salamat and Moyen-Chari prefectures. The third and fourth jurisdictions had their headquarters in Pala and Moundou and were delegated to the Oblats de Marie and Capuchin orders. The Pala bishopric served Mayo-Kebbi Prefecture, while the bishopric of Moundou was responsible for missions in Logone Occidental and Logone Oriental prefectures. By far the most important jurisdiction in 1970, Pala included 116,000 of Chad's 160,000 Catholics.

The relatively slow progress of the Catholic Church in Chad has several causes. Although the Catholic Church has been much more open to local cultures than Protestantism, the doctrine of celibacy probably has deterred candidates for the priesthood. Insistence on monogamy also has undoubtedly made the faith less attractive to some potential converts, particularly wealthy older men able to afford more than one wife.

The social works of the Catholic Church have made it an important institution in Chad. Like their Protestant counterparts, the Catholic missions have a history of social service. In the 1970s, along with priests, the staffs of most establishments included brothers and nuns who worked in the areas of health, education, and development. Many of the nuns were trained medical professionals who served on the staffs of government hospitals and clinics. It was estimated that 20,000 Chadians attended Catholic schools in 1980. Adult literacy classes also reached beyond the traditional school-aged population. In the area of development, as early as the 1950s Catholic missions in southern Chad set up rural development centers whose clientele included non-Christians as well as Christians.
