= Saint-Hilaire-du-Harcouët =

- Commune
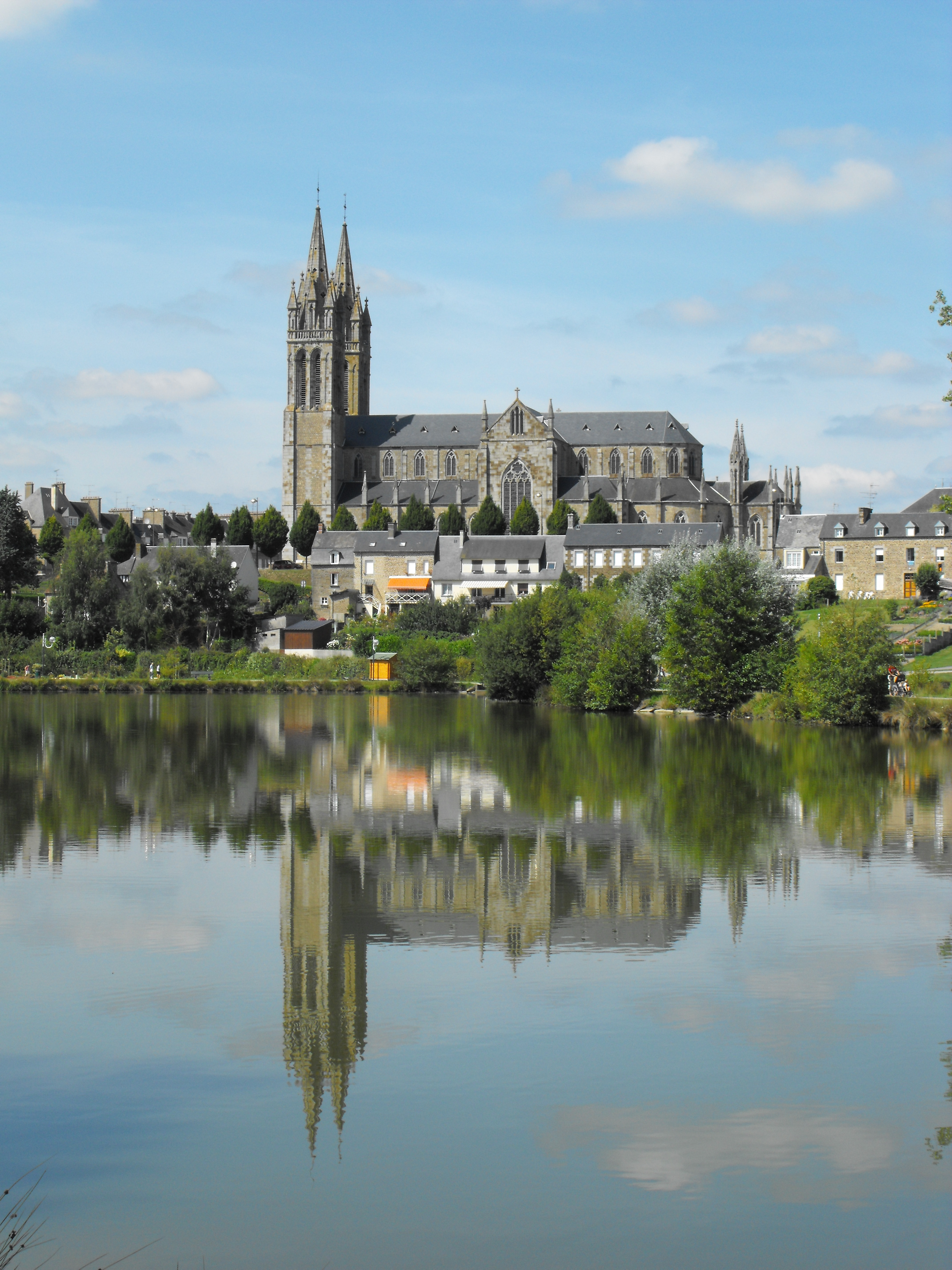
- The church of Saint-Hilaire
- Location of Saint-Hilaire-du-Harcouët
- Location within France Location within Normandy
- Coordinates: 48°34′42″N 1°05′27″W
- Country: France
- Region: Normandy
- Department: Manche
- Arrondissement: Avranches
- Canton: Saint-Hilaire-du-Harcouët
- Intercommunality: CA Mont-Saint-Michel-Normandie

Government
  - Mayor (2020–2026): Jacky Bouvet
- Area^{1}: 46.97 km^{2} (18.14 sq mi)
- Elevation: 19 m (62 ft)
- Highest elevation: 119 m (390 ft)
- Lowest elevation: 58 m (190 ft)
- Population (2023): 5,770
  - Density: 123/km^{2} (318/sq mi)
- Time zone: UTC+01:00 (CET)
  - Summer (DST): UTC+02:00 (CEST)
- INSEE/Postal code: 50484 /50600
- ^{1} French Land Register data, which excludes lakes, ponds, glaciers > 1 km^{2} (0.386 sq mi or 247 acres) and river estuaries.

Saint-Hilaire-du-Harcouët (French pronunciation: [sɛ̃.t‿ilɛʁ dy aʁkwɛ]) is a commune in the Manche department in Normandy in north-western France. On 1 January 2016, the former communes of Saint-Martin-de-Landelles and Virey were merged into Saint-Hilaire-du-Harcouët.

It is approximately 50 miles (80 km) east of St. Malo and a similar distance northeast of Rennes. A medieval tower in the town centre, the only remainder of the old church, contains frescos by painter Marthe Flandrin.

== Geography ==
=== Climate ===
Saint-Hilaire-du-Harcouët has an oceanic climate (Köppen climate classification Cfb). The average annual temperature in Saint-Hilaire-du-Harcouët is 11.4 °C (52.5 °F). The average annual rainfall is 947.2 mm (37.29 in) with December as the wettest month. The temperatures are highest on average in July, at around 18.1 °C (64.6 °F), and lowest in December, at around 5.2 °C (41.4 °F). The highest temperature ever recorded in Saint-Hilaire-du-Harcouët was 37.5 °C (99.5 °F) on 7 August 2020; the coldest temperature ever recorded was −12.0 °C (10.4 °F) on 2 January 1997.

Climate data for Saint-Hilaire-du-Harcouët (1991–2020 normals, extremes 1991–present)
Month	Jan	Feb	Mar	Apr	May	Jun	Jul	Aug	Sep	Oct	Nov	Dec	Year
Record high °C (°F)	16.0 (60.8)	21.5 (70.7)	24.2 (75.6)	28.2 (82.8)	30.3 (86.5)	37.2 (99.0)	38.7 (101.7)	37.5 (99.5)	33.3 (91.9)	29.3 (84.7)	21.5 (70.7)	17.4 (63.3)	38.7 (101.7)
Mean daily maximum °C (°F)	8.4 (47.1)	9.6 (49.3)	12.3 (54.1)	15.4 (59.7)	18.7 (65.7)	21.9 (71.4)	23.7 (74.7)	23.5 (74.3)	20.9 (69.6)	16.5 (61.7)	11.9 (53.4)	8.9 (48.0)	16.0 (60.8)
Daily mean °C (°F)	5.6 (42.1)	6.0 (42.8)	8.0 (46.4)	10.3 (50.5)	13.6 (56.5)	16.6 (61.9)	18.3 (64.9)	18.1 (64.6)	15.4 (59.7)	12.3 (54.1)	8.5 (47.3)	5.9 (42.6)	11.5 (52.7)
Mean daily minimum °C (°F)	2.7 (36.9)	2.5 (36.5)	3.7 (38.7)	5.3 (41.5)	8.5 (47.3)	11.4 (52.5)	12.9 (55.2)	12.7 (54.9)	10.0 (50.0)	8.2 (46.8)	5.1 (41.2)	2.9 (37.2)	7.2 (45.0)
Record low °C (°F)	−12.0 (10.4)	−11.7 (10.9)	−7.1 (19.2)	−5.0 (23.0)	−1.7 (28.9)	2.5 (36.5)	4.8 (40.6)	3.0 (37.4)	0.8 (33.4)	−5.5 (22.1)	−7.5 (18.5)	−11.4 (11.5)	−12.0 (10.4)
Average precipitation mm (inches)	91.5 (3.60)	74.2 (2.92)	67.5 (2.66)	64.1 (2.52)	67.7 (2.67)	58.1 (2.29)	62.0 (2.44)	66.7 (2.63)	73.3 (2.89)	95.6 (3.76)	98.1 (3.86)	110.7 (4.36)	929.5 (36.59)
Average precipitation days (≥ 1.0 mm)	15.2	12.3	11.6	11.3	10.4	8.4	9.6	10.2	10.3	12.8	14.6	14.8	141.5
Source: Meteociel

== Population ==
The population data given in the table below refer to the commune in its geography as of January 2025.

Historical population
Year	Pop.	±% p.a.
1968	6,809	—
1975	7,233	+0.87%
1982	6,986	−0.50%
1990	6,573	−0.76%
1999	6,490	−0.14%
2007	6,373	−0.23%
2012	6,204	−0.54%
2017	6,094	−0.36%
2023	5,770	−0.91%
Source: INSEE

== Heraldry ==
Arms of Saint-Hilaire-du-Harcouët	The arms of Saint-Hilaire-du-Harcouët are blazoned : Gules, a tower argent, and in chief 3 mullets Or.

== See also ==
- Communes of the Manche department
