= Samuel Gaumain =

French Roman Catholic bishop

- Bishop
- Church: Roman Catholic Church
- See: Moundou Diocese
- In office: 1959–1974
- Predecessor: Clément Sirgue
- Successor: Joseph Marie Régis Belzile
- Previous post: Priest

Orders
- Ordination: 12 March 1938

Personal details
- Born: 4 January 1915 Saint-Pierre-de-l'Isle, France
- Died: 20 August 2010 (aged 95)

Samuel Gaumain OFMCap (4 January 1915 – 20 August 2010) was a French Capuchin friar and bishop of the Roman Catholic Church.

Gaumain was born in Saint-Pierre-de-l'Isle, France in January 1915. He was ordained a priest on 12 March 1938 in the Order of Friars Minor Capuchin. He was appointed bishop of Moundou Diocese (Chad) on 19 December 1959 and ordained a bishop on 28 April 1960. He remained in this position until he resigned on 19 December 1974.
