= Diocese of Doba =

Roman Catholic diocese in Chad

Coordinates: 8.6587°N 16.8570°E

Diocese of Doba Dioecesis Dobana Diocèse de Doba

Location
- Country: Chad
- Metropolitan: Archdiocese of N'Djaména
- Headquarters: Doba, Logone Oriental, Chad

Statistics
- Area: 10,816 km^{2} (4,176 sq mi)
- Population: Total; Catholics: (as of 2023); 526,162; 112,790 (21.4%)
- Parishes: 12

Information
- Denomination: Catholic Church
- Sui iuris church: Latin Church
- Rite: Roman Rite
- Established: 6 March 1989; 37 years ago
- Cathedral: Cathédrale Sainte-Thérèse in Doba
- Patron saint: Thérèse of Lisieux
- Secular priests: 27 (16 Diocesan, 11 Religious Orders)

Current leadership
- Pope: Leo XIV
- Bishop: Martin Waïngue Bani
- Metropolitan Archbishop: Edmond Jitangar

Map
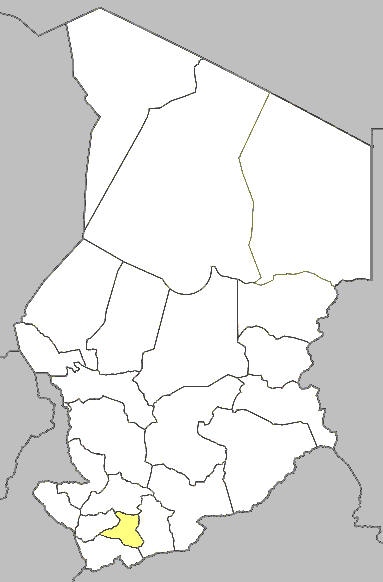

The Roman Catholic Diocese of Doba (Latin: Doban(us)) is a diocese in Doba in the ecclesiastical province of N'Djamena in Chad.

== History ==
- 6 March 1989: Established as Diocese of Doba from the Diocese of Moundou

== Leadership ==
=== Bishops of Doba ===
- Michele Russo, M.C.C.I. (6 March 1989 – 30 January 2014), resigned
  - Apostolic Administrator Miguel Ángel Sebastián Martínez, M.C.C.I. (30 January 2014 – 18 February 2017), Bishop of Laï
- Martin Waïngue Bani (10 December 2016 – Present)

=== Another priest of this diocese who became bishop ===
- Joachim Kouraleyo Tarounga (1989-2004), appointed Bishop of Moundou in 2004

== See also ==
Roman Catholicism in Chad

== Sources ==
- GCatholic.org
