= Matthias N'Gartéri Mayadi =

Chadian Catholic prelate

The Most Reverend Matthias N’Gartéri Mayadi
- Roman Catholic Archdiocese of N'Djaména
- Installed: 31 July 2003
- Term ended: 19 November 2013
- Predecessor: Charles Louis Joseph Vandame
- Successor: Edmond Jitangar
- Other posts: Bishop of Sarh, Bishop of Moundou

Orders
- Ordination: 30 December 1978
- Consecration: 12 April 1986

Personal details
- Born: 1942
- Died: 19 November 2013 (aged 70–71)

Matthias N’Gartéri Mayadi (1942 – 19 November 2013) was a Chadian Roman Catholic bishop. He was the Roman Catholic archbishop of the Archdiocese of N'Djaména in Chad from 2003 until his death in 2013.

N'Gartéri Mayadi was ordained as a priest on 30 December 1978 and became the bishop of Sarh in 1987, which he was until 1990. He was the bishop of Moundou from 1990 to 2003. On 31 July 2003, N'Gartéri Mayadi succeeded Charles Louis Joseph Vandame as the archbishop of N'Djaména.
