= Diocese of Sarh =

Roman Catholic diocese in Chad

Coordinates: 9.1448°N 18.3840°E

Diocese of Sarh Dioecesis Sarhensis Diocèse de Sarh

Location
- Country: Chad
- Metropolitan: Archdiocese of N'Djaména
- Headquarters: Sarh, Chad

Statistics
- Area: 41,755 km^{2} (16,122 sq mi)
- Population: Total; Catholics: (as of 2023); 800,000; 85,917 (10.7%)
- Parishes: 12

Information
- Denomination: Catholic Church
- Sui iuris church: Latin Church
- Rite: Roman Rite
- Established: 22 December 1961; 64 years ago
- Cathedral: Cathédrale Notre Dame de l’Immaculée Conception in Sarh
- Secular priests: 13

Current leadership
- Bishop: Jean Miguina, O.F.M.Cap.
- Metropolitan Archbishop: Edmond Jitangar

The Roman Catholic Diocese of Sarh (Latin: Sarhen(sis)) is a diocese in Sarh in the ecclesiastical province of N'Djamena in Chad.

== History ==
- 22 December 1961: Established as Diocese of Fort-Archambault from the Diocese of Fort-Lamy
- 22 August 1972: Renamed as Diocese of Sarh

== Special churches ==
The cathedral is Cathédrale Notre Dame de l’Immaculée Conception in Sarh.

== Bishops ==
=== Ordinaries, in reverse chronological order ===
Bishops of Sarh, below

- Jean Miguina O.F.M.Cap. (since 16 July 2026)
- Miguel Ángel Sebastián Martínez, MCCJ (10 October 2018 – 16 July 2026)
- Edmond Jitangar (11 October 1991 – 20 August 2016), appointed Archbishop of N’Djaména
- Matthias N’Gartéri Mayadi (7 March 1987 – 11 June 1990), appointed Bishop of Moundou
- Henri Véniat, S.J. (22 August 1972 – 7 March 1987), resigned; see below

Bishop of Fort-Archambault, below

- Henri Véniat, S.J. (22 December 1961 – 22 August 1972); see above

=== Auxiliary bishop ===
- Matthias N’Gartéri Mayadi (1985-1987), appointed Bishop here

== See also ==
Roman Catholicism in Chad

== Sources ==
- GCatholic.org
