= Archdiocese of N'Djaména =

Roman Catholic archdiocese in Chad

Coordinates: 12.1114°N 15.0373°E

Metropolitan Archdiocese of N'Djamena
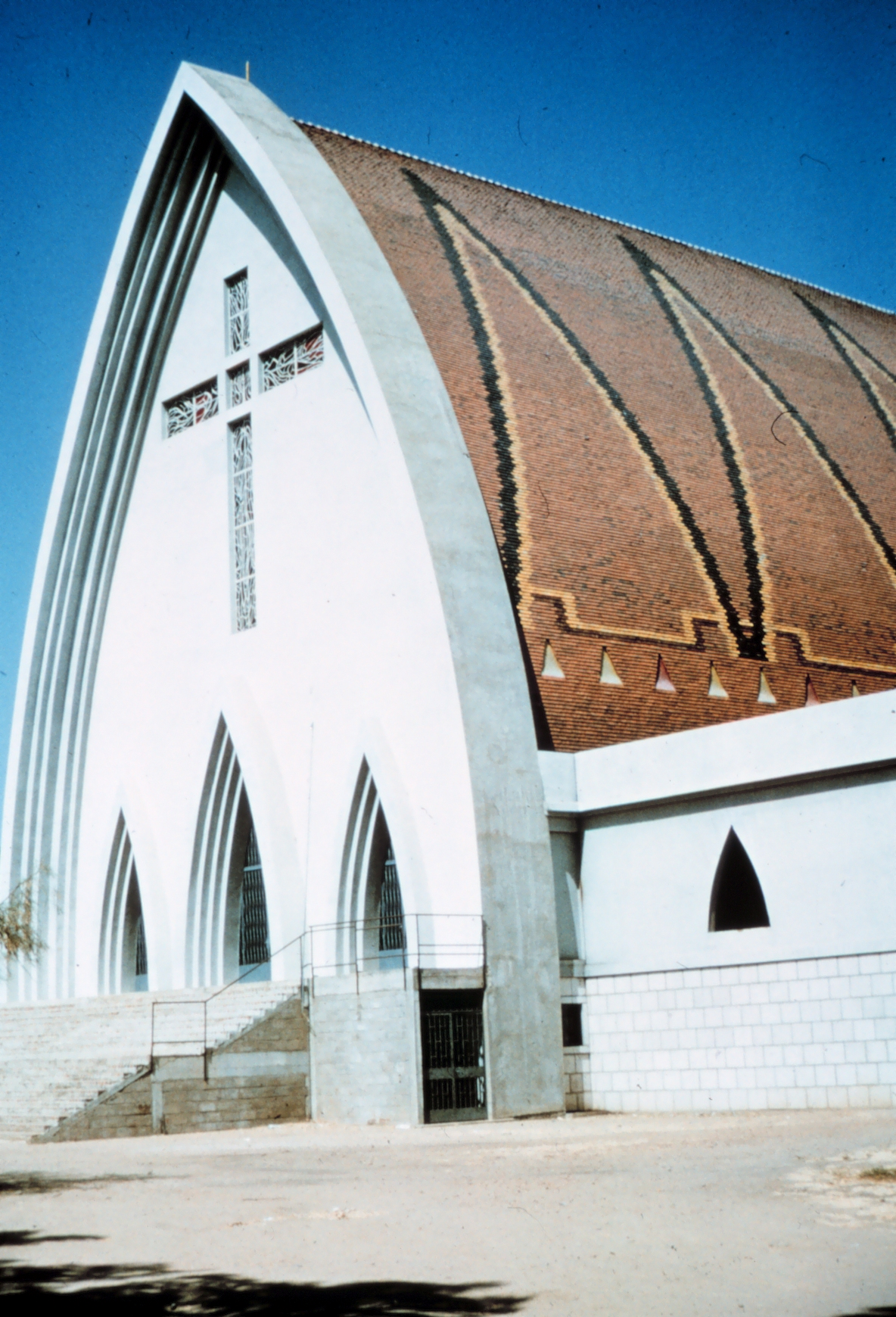
- Cathédrale de Notre-Dame in N’Djaména, pre-1973.

- Archdiocese logo

Location
- Country: Chad
- Ecclesiastical province: N'Djamena

Information
- Denomination: Catholic Church
- Rite: Latin Rite
- Cathedral: Cathédrale Notre-Dame

Current leadership
- Pope: Leo XIV
- Archbishop: Edmond Jitangar
- Metropolitan Archbishop: Edmond Jitangar
- Bishops emeritus: Charles Louis Joseph Vandame, S.J.

Map
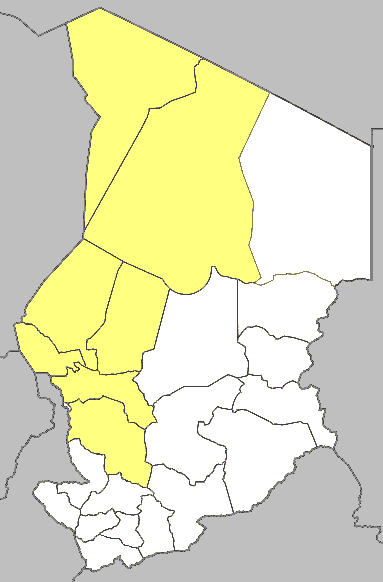

The Metropolitan Archdiocese of N'Djaména is the metropolitan see for the ecclesiastical province of N’Djaména in Chad.

== History ==
- January 9, 1947: Established as Apostolic Prefecture of Fort-Lamy from:
  - Apostolic Prefecture of Berbérati, Central African Republic
  - Apostolic Vicariate of Foumban, Cameroon
  - Apostolic Vicariate of Khartoum, Sudan
- September 14, 1955: Promoted as Diocese of Fort-Lamy
- December 22, 1961: Promoted as Metropolitan Archdiocese of Fort-Lamy
- October 15, 1973: Renamed as Metropolitan Archdiocese of N’Djaména

== Special churches ==
The seat is the Cathédrale de Notre-Dame in N’Djaména.

== Leadership, in reverse chronological order ==
- Metropolitan Archbishops of N’Djaména (Roman rite), below
  - Archbishop Edmond Jitangar: August 20, 2016 – present
  - Archbishop Matthias N’Gartéri Mayadi: July 31, 2003 – November 19, 2013
  - Archbishop Charles Louis Joseph Vandame, S.J.: May 23, 1981 – July 31, 2003
  - Archbishop Paul-Pierre-Yves Dalmais, S.J.: October 15, 1973 – March 6, 1980; see below
- Metropolitan Archbishop of Fort-Lamy (Roman rite), below
  - Archbishop Paul-Pierre-Yves Dalmais, S.J.: December 22, 1961 – October 15, 1973; see above & below
- Bishop of Fort-Lamy (Roman rite), below
  - Bishop Paul-Pierre-Yves Dalmais, S.J.: December 24, 1957 – December 22, 1961; see above
- Prefect Apostolic of Fort-Lamy, below
  - Father Joseph du Bouchet, S.J.: April 25, 1947 - 1957

== Suffragan dioceses ==
- Diocese of Doba
- Diocese of Goré
- Diocese of Koumra
- Diocese of Lai
- Diocese of Moundou
- Diocese of Pala
- Diocese of Sarh

== See also ==
- List of Roman Catholic dioceses in Chad
- Aïda Yazbeck, Catholic nun, Al-Mouna Cultural Center Director

== Sources ==
- GCatholic.org
