= N'Djamena =

Capital and largest city of Chad

N'Djamena N'Djaména (French) انجمينا (Arabic) Fort-Lamy
- Capital city and Special Status Province
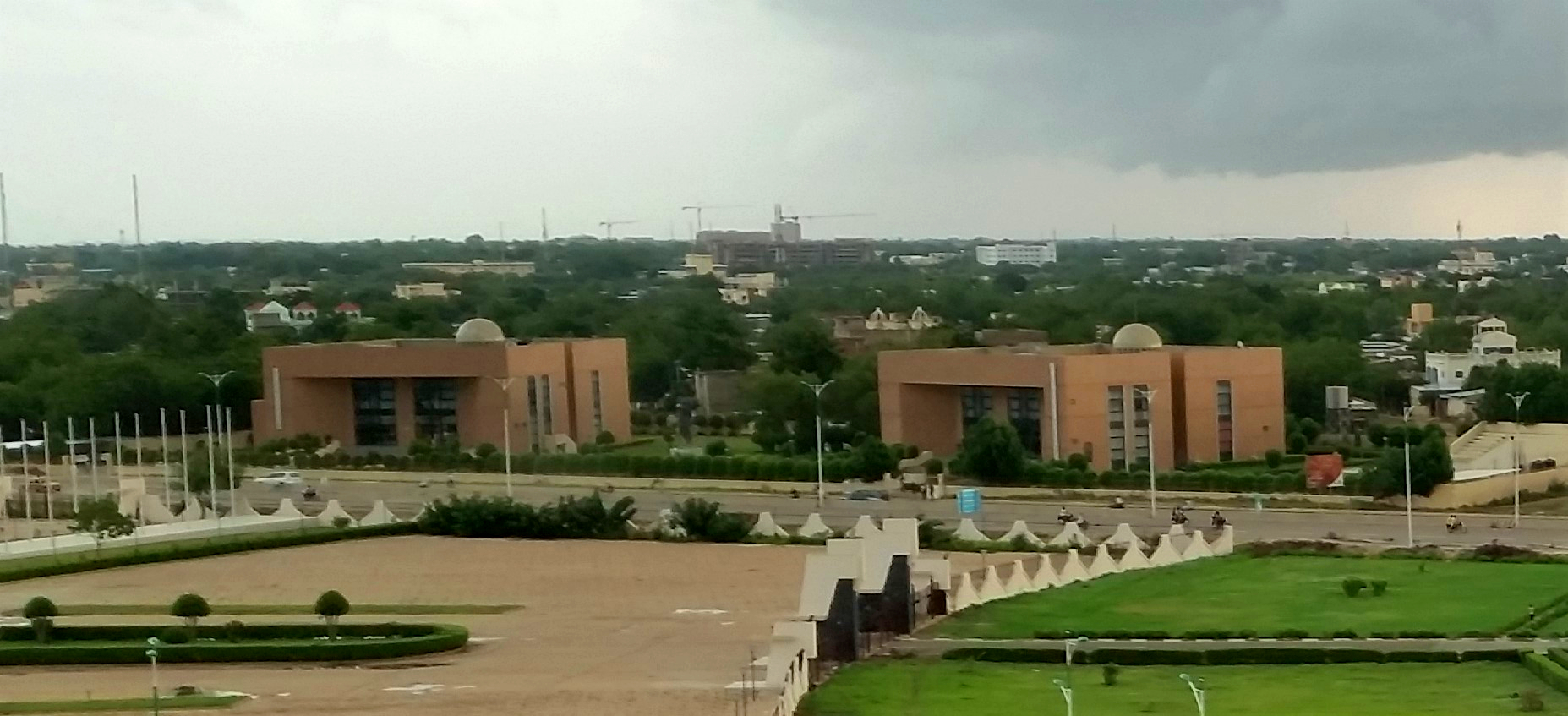
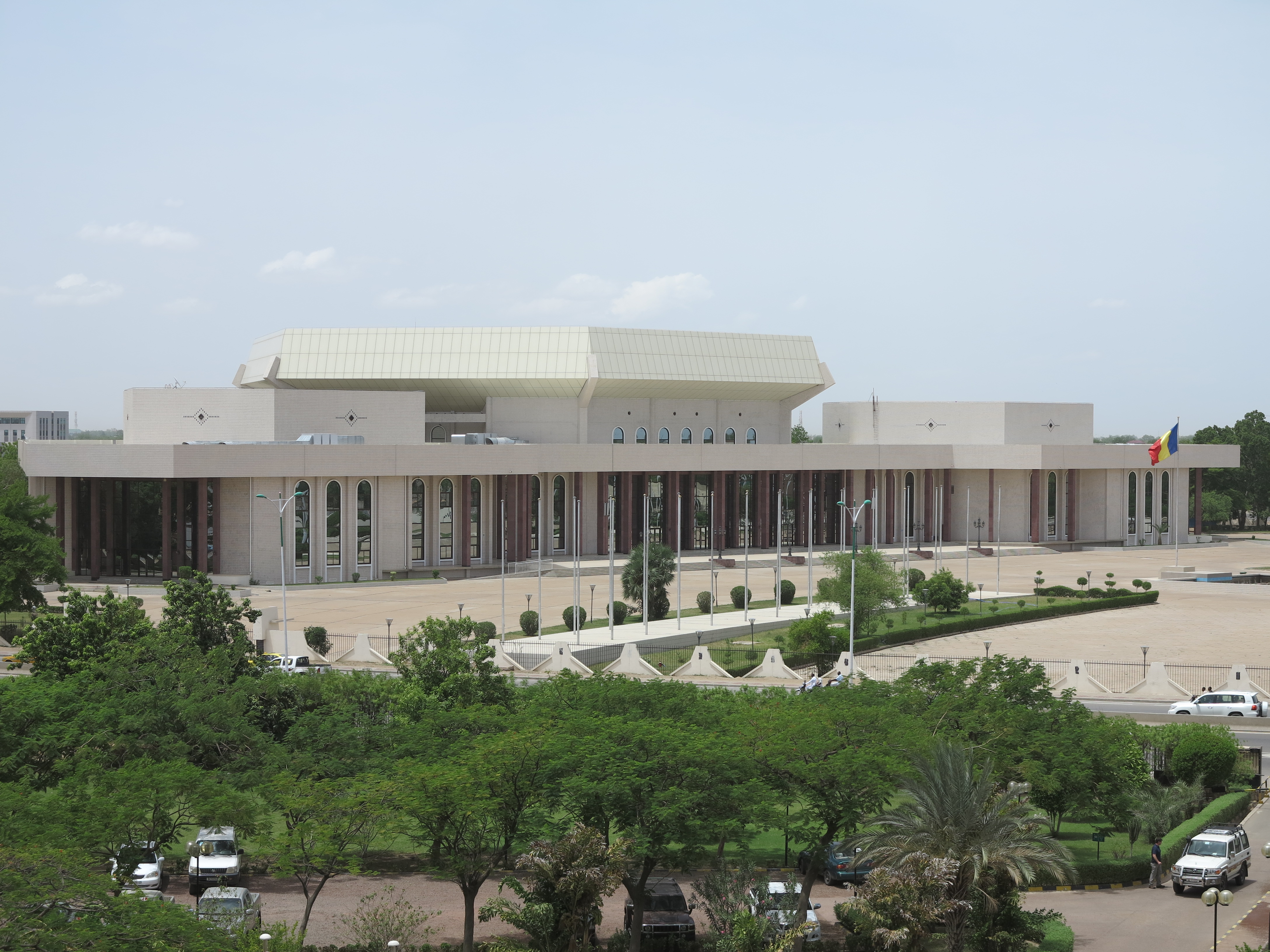
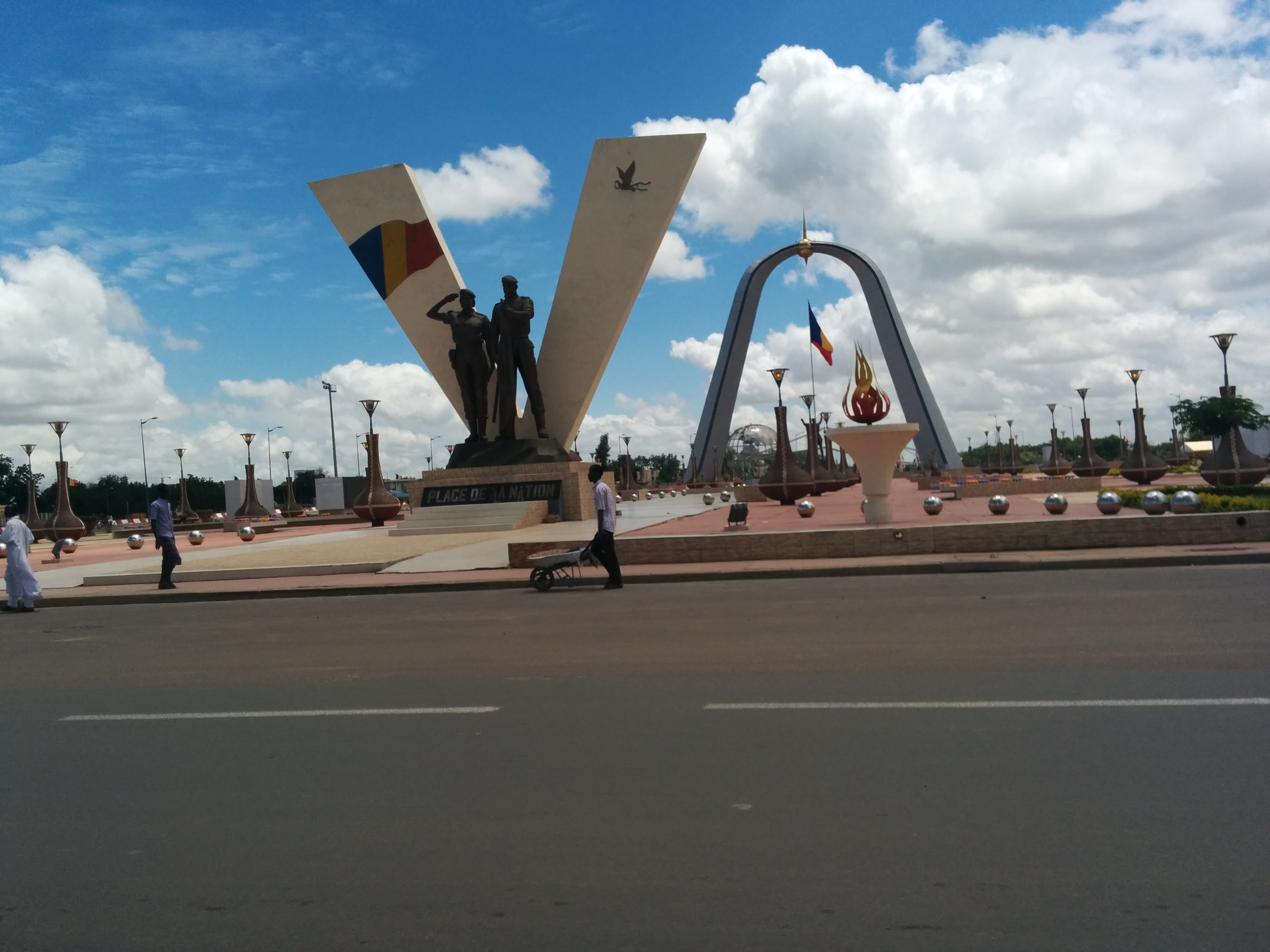
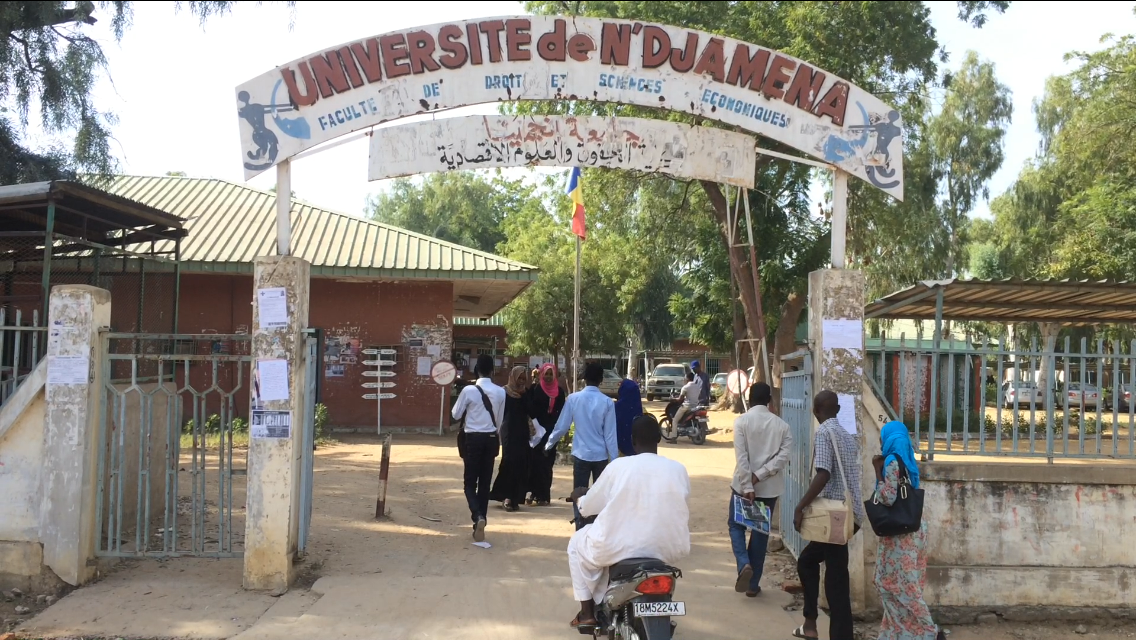
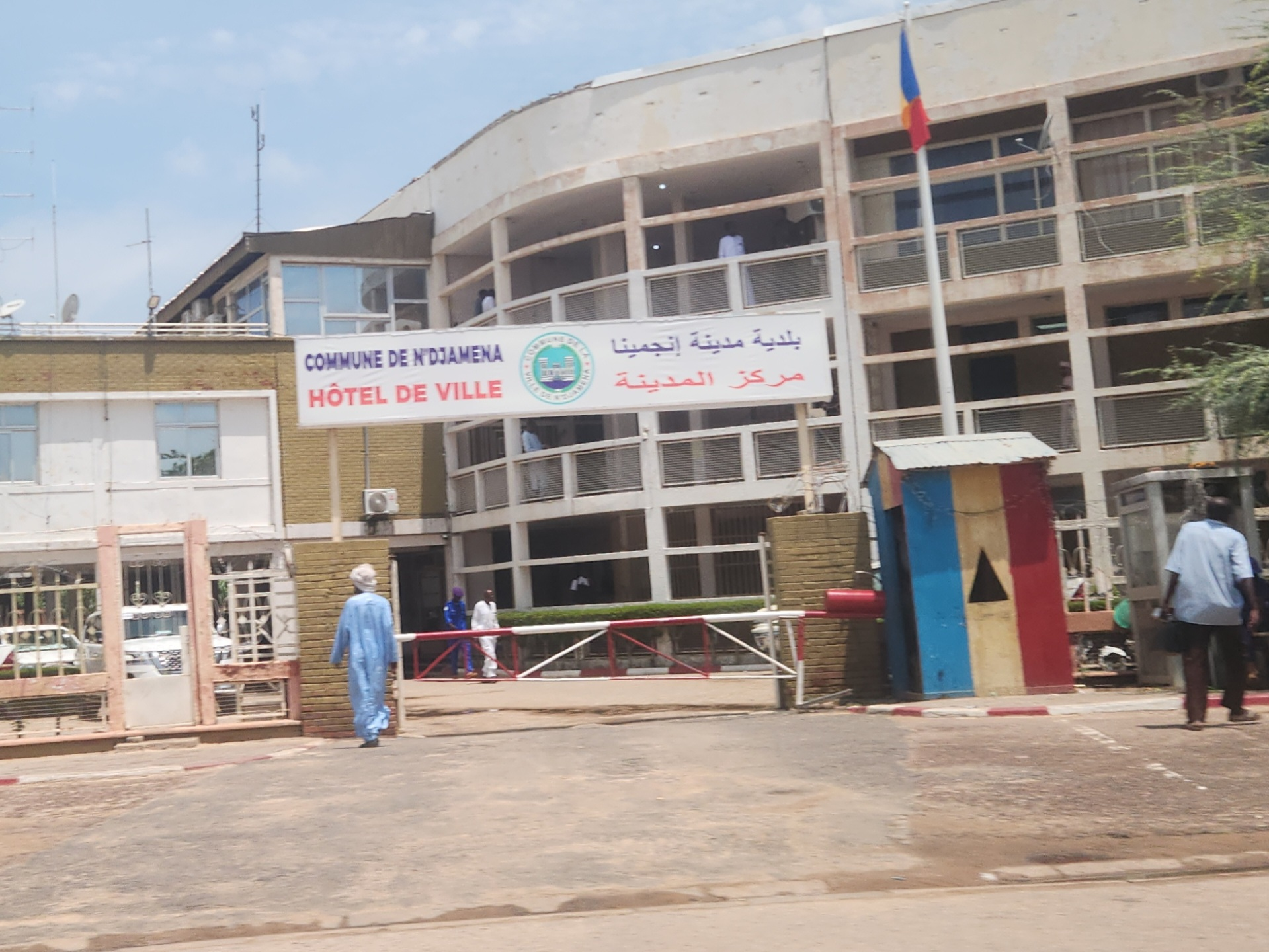
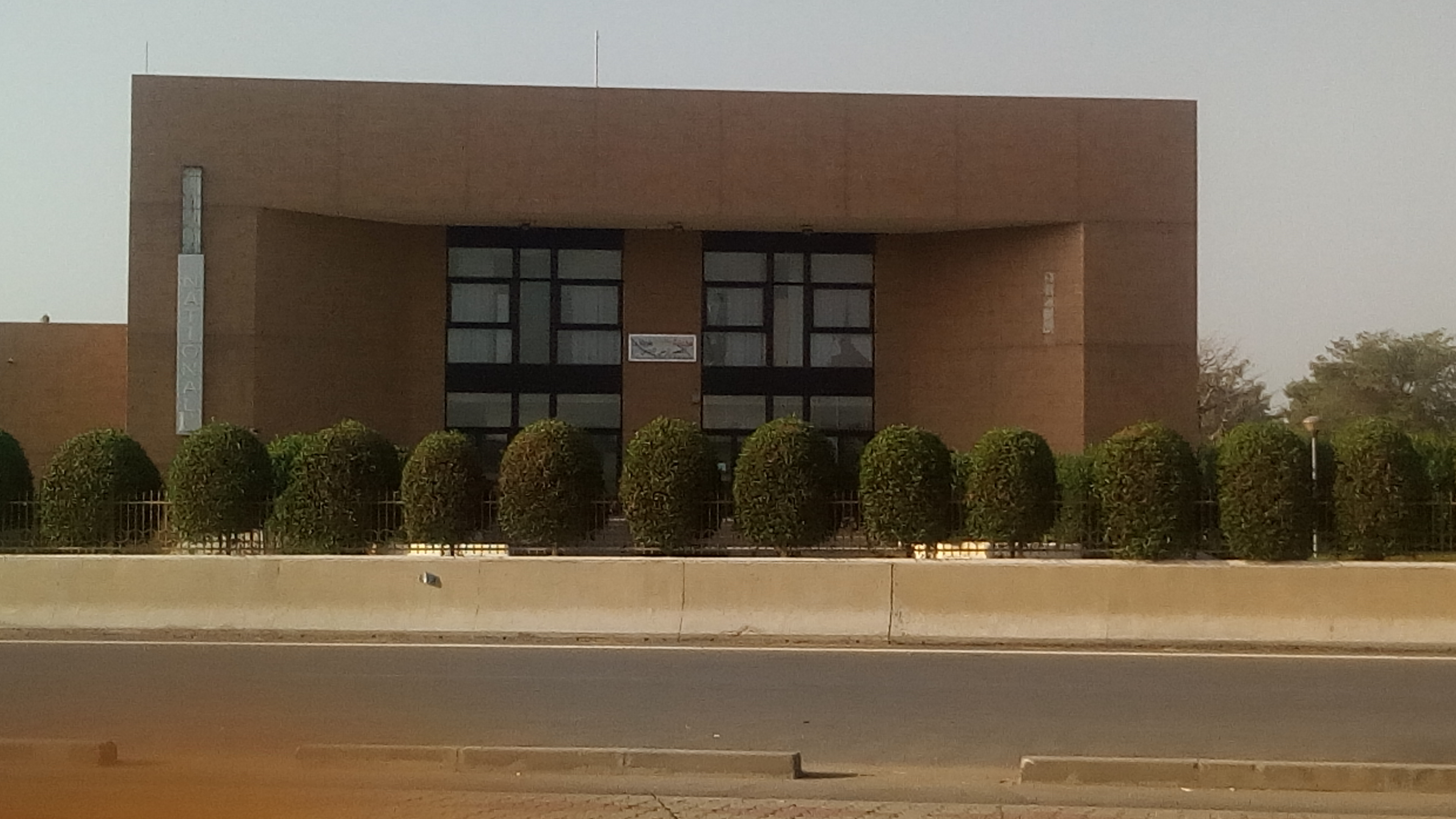
- N'Djamena skyline The National Assembly Nation Square (Place de la Nation) University of N'Djamena City Hall of N'Djamena Chad National Museum

- Coat of arms

- Location within Chad Location within Africa
- Coordinates: 12°06′19″N 15°02′41″E
- Country: Chad

Area
  - Capital city and Special Status Province: 104 km^{2} (40 sq mi)
  - Metro: 166 km^{2} (64 sq mi)
- Elevation: 298 m (978 ft)

Population (2009 census)
  - Capital city and Special Status Province: 807,000
  - Estimate (2022): 721,081
  - Rank: 1st in Chad
  - Density: 9,148/km^{2} (23,690/sq mi)
  - Urban: 1,697,201
  - Metro: 1,794,000
- Time zone: UTC+01:00 (WAT)
- Area code: 235
- ISO 3166 code: TD-ND
- HDI (2023): 0.558 medium · 1st

N'Djamena (Note: French: N'Djaména, pronounced [n(ə)dʒamena]; Arabic: انجمينا, romanized: Injamīnā) (English: /əndʒɑːˈmeɪnə/ ən-jah-MAY-nə) is the capital and largest city of Chad. It is also a Special Status Province, divided into 10 districts or arrondissements.

Originally called Fort-Lamy, it was founded in 1900 by the French during their colonization of Central Africa. The city was renamed N'Djamena in 1973, reflecting its local Chadian heritage. Throughout its history, N'Djamena has grown from a small trading hub into the political and economic center of Chad, playing a vital role in the country's development. Its strategic location near the borders of Cameroon and Nigeria has historically made it an important crossroads for trade and cultural exchange in the region.

N'Djamena is situated on the Chari River in the southwestern part of Chad, near Lake Chad. The city lies within a semi-arid region characterized by a hot climate with a distinct dry season. Its location on the river provides vital water resources for agriculture and daily life, although the surrounding landscape is largely flat and arid. The city's proximity to Lake Chad also influences its climate and ecology, making it an important area for both local agriculture and regional trade. The geography of N'Djamena has shaped its development as a key urban center in Chad, with its strategic position contributing to its historical and economic significance.

The city serves as the centre of economic activity in Chad. Meat, fish and cotton processing are the chief industries, and it is a regional market for livestock, salt, dates, and grains.

It is a port city located at the confluence of the Logone River with the Chari River, forming a transborder agglomeration with the city of Kousséri (in Cameroon), capital of the Department of Logone-et-Chari, which is on the west bank of both rivers.

== Etymology ==
The name "N'Djamena" is derived from the Arabic term "Niǧāmīnā" (نجامينا), meaning "place of rest" or "place of peace".

Before its renaming in 1973, the city was known as Fort-Lamy, named after French army officer Amédée-François Lamy. The change to N'Djamena was part of a broader movement to replace colonial names with indigenous ones, reflecting the local Arabic heritage and cultural identity. (Note: The shift from Fort-Lamy to N'Djamena symbolizes a reclaiming of identity, as the new name is derived from the local Arabic dialect spoken in Chad.)

== History ==
=== Early 20th century ===
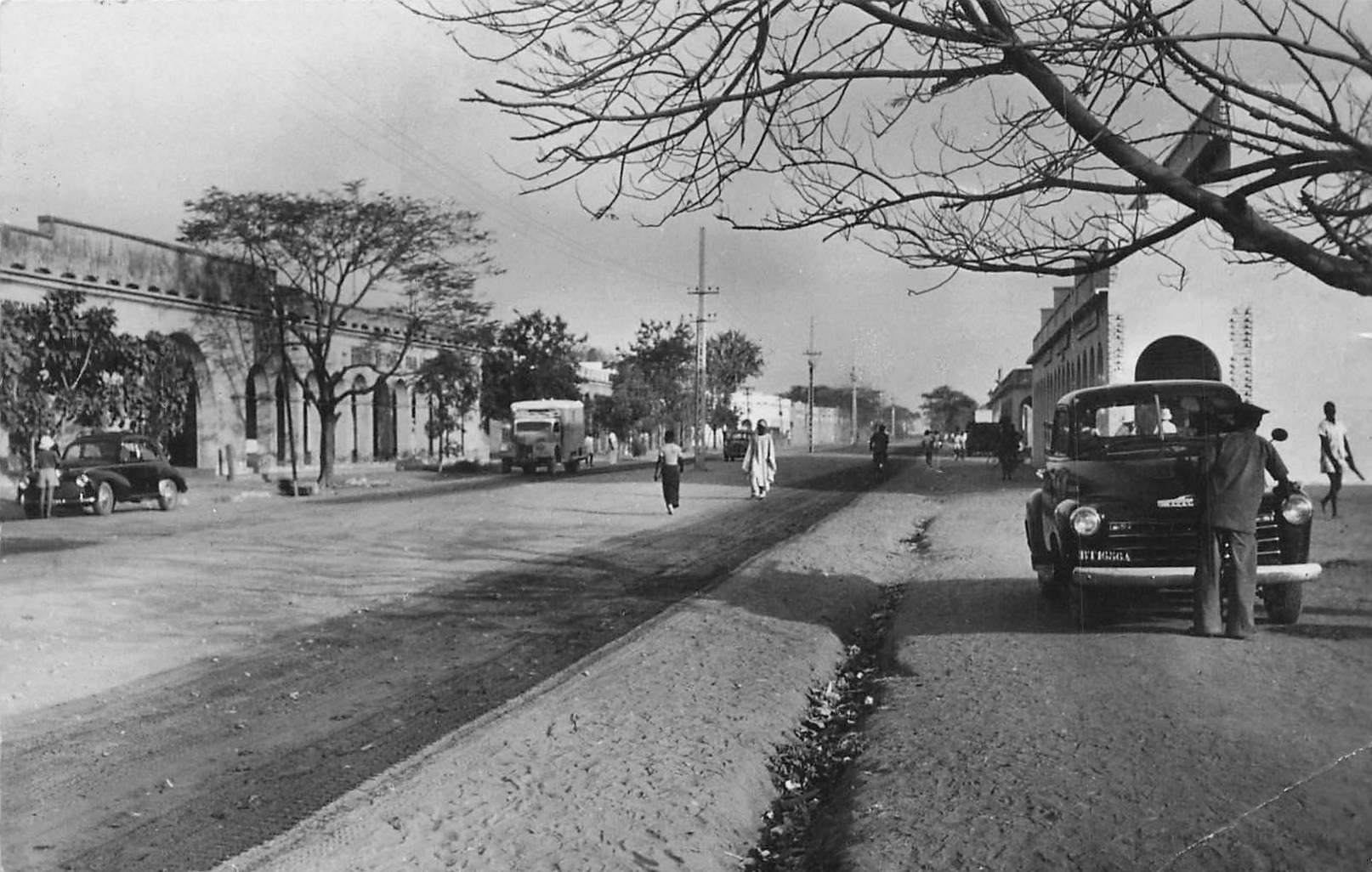
A street in N'Djamena, 1952

N'Djamena was founded as Fort-Lamy by French commander Émile Gentil on 29 May 1900, named after Amédée-François Lamy, an army officer who had been killed in the Battle of Kousséri about a month earlier. It was merely a colonial outpost in its early days, and until the 1920s, the city was entirely under French military rule. It has since expanded into a major trading city and has become the capital of the region and nation.

During the Second World War, the French relied upon the city's airport to move troops and supplies. On 21 January 1942, a lone German Heinkel He 111 of the Sonderkommando Blaich successfully bombed the airfield at Fort-Lamy, destroying oil supplies and ten aircraft.

Fort-Lamy received its first bank branch in 1950, when the Paris-based Banque de l'Afrique Occidentale opened a branch there.

On 18 November 1956, Fort-Lamy held its first municipal elections. The city was divided into five electoral sections, each with a certain number of assigned seats on the thirty-three-seat municipal council based on population. The first electoral section was the European district, which was allocated four seats on the municipal council. The second section was a mixed residential district, and the remaining three were African districts. The first municipal council was composed of twenty-five Africans and eight Europeans. The European district remained a separate part of the city into the 1960s, after independence.

=== Late 20th century ===
Chad gained its independence from France in 1960. On 6 April 1973, President François Tombalbaye changed the city's name to N'Djamena (taken from the Arabic name of a nearby village, Niǧāmīnā, meaning "place of rest") as part of his authenticité program of Africanization. The city was occupied by Libya during the 1980–81 Libyan intervention as part of the Chadian–Libyan conflict, and the associated Transitional Government of National Unity.

The city was partly destroyed during the Chadian Civil War in 1979 and again in 1980. In these years, almost all of the population fled the town, seeking refuge on the opposite bank of the Chari River in Cameroon, next to the city of Kousséri. The residents did not return until 1981–82, after the end of the clashes. Until 1984, facilities and services were subject to strict rationing, and schools remained closed.

The period of turmoil in the city was started by the abortive coup attempted by the northern Prime Minister Hissène Habré against the southern President Félix Malloum: while Malloum and the national army loyal to him were defeated, the intervention in the battle of other northern factions rival to that of Habré complicated the situation. A temporary truce was reached in 1979 through international mediation, establishing the warlord Goukouni Oueddei as head of a government of national unity with his rival Habré as Defense Minister. The intense rivalry between Goukouni and Habré caused the eruption of new clashes in the city in 1980; N'Djamena found itself divided into sectors controlled by the various warlords. The tug-of-war reached a conclusion after many months only when Goukouni asked for the intervention of the Libyans, whose tanks overwhelmed Habré's defenses in the capital.

Historical population
Year	Pop.	±%
1937	9,976	—
1940	12,552	+25.8%
1947	18,375	+46.4%
1960	60,000	+226.5%
1970	130,000	+116.7%
1993	530,965	+308.4%
2000	728,000	+37.1%
2009	951,418	+30.7%
2012	1,092,066	+14.8%
2019	1,360,000	+24.5%

Following differences between Goukouni and Muammar Gaddafi and international disapproval of Libyan intervention, the Libyan troops left the capital and Chad in 1981. This opened the door to Habré, who marched on N'Djamena, occupying the city with little resistance in 1982 and installing himself as the new president. He was eventually dislodged in a similar fashion in 1990 by a former general of his, Idriss Déby.

The city had only 9,976 inhabitants in 1937, but a decade later, in 1947, the population had almost doubled to 18,435. In 1968, after independence, the population reached 126,483. In 1993, it surpassed half a million with 529,555. A good deal of this growth has been due to refugees fleeing into N'Djamena for security, although many people also fled N'Djamena, depending on the political situation. The city's population surpassed the million mark by the early 2010s.

=== 21st century ===
On 13 April 2006, a rebel United Front for Democratic Change attack on the city was defeated in the Battle of N'Djamena. The city was attacked again on 2 February 2008 by UFDD and RFC rebels in the Battle of N'Djamena (2008). As of 2020, French military forces maintained a base in N'Djamena to counter rebels from the Sahel.

== Geography ==
N'Djamena is located at 12°06′36″N 15°03′00″E, on the confluence of the Chari and Logone rivers.

The city is formally divided into 10 administrative districts, which are loosely grouped into three distinct areas of the city. There is an old colonial core along the Chari River which houses many of the administrative institutions that fulfill N'Djamena's role as national capital. To the north and east of the core, there is newer construction, referred to by some residents as the "African city", with mixed-class residents and much of the city's trade. Most of the city's current growth is in the third area, even further east, with limited formal infrastructure.

While primarily an administrative centre, the city includes the Nassara Strip commercial centre and residential areas, such as Mbololo, Chagoua, Paris Congo and Moursal. The main commercial avenue of the city is the Avenue Charles de Gaulle.

== Climate ==
N'Djamena has a hot semi-arid climate (Köppen BSh) with a short wet season and a lengthy dry season. Despite the fact that the city receives, on average, approximately 510 mm (20 in) of rainfall annually, due to the area's very high evapotranspiration, N'Djamena still falls into the semi-arid climate category. The wet season lasts from June to September, with the heaviest rain occurring in August. The dry season essentially covers the remaining eight months. Based on annual temperatures, N'Djamena is one of the hottest major cities on the planet. In only one month of the year (August) do average monthly high temperatures fail to cross the 32 °C (90 °F) mark. The city's highest temperatures are usually seen between March and May, just before the onset of the heavier rains.

Climate data for N'Djamena (1991–2020, extremes 1985–present)
Month	Jan	Feb	Mar	Apr	May	Jun	Jul	Aug	Sep	Oct	Nov	Dec	Year
Record high °C (°F)	41.5 (106.7)	43.9 (111.0)	46.0 (114.8)	46.6 (115.9)	46.4 (115.5)	44.5 (112.1)	42.0 (107.6)	38.2 (100.8)	40.8 (105.4)	41.8 (107.2)	42.0 (107.6)	40.5 (104.9)	46.6 (115.9)
Mean daily maximum °C (°F)	32.7 (90.9)	36.1 (97.0)	39.9 (103.8)	42.0 (107.6)	41.2 (106.2)	38.2 (100.8)	34.1 (93.4)	31.8 (89.2)	34.0 (93.2)	37.6 (99.7)	37.1 (98.8)	33.8 (92.8)	36.5 (97.7)
Daily mean °C (°F)	23.6 (74.5)	26.8 (80.2)	31.1 (88.0)	34.1 (93.4)	34.2 (93.6)	31.9 (89.4)	28.8 (83.8)	27.3 (81.1)	28.6 (83.5)	30.1 (86.2)	28.1 (82.6)	24.4 (75.9)	29.2 (84.6)
Mean daily minimum °C (°F)	14.8 (58.6)	17.7 (63.9)	22.7 (72.9)	26.1 (79.0)	27.0 (80.6)	25.7 (78.3)	23.7 (74.7)	22.9 (73.2)	23.4 (74.1)	22.9 (73.2)	19.3 (66.7)	15.6 (60.1)	21.9 (71.4)
Record low °C (°F)	6.5 (43.7)	10.0 (50.0)	14.6 (58.3)	18.4 (65.1)	20.6 (69.1)	20.3 (68.5)	19.4 (66.9)	18.5 (65.3)	18.5 (65.3)	16.2 (61.2)	13.4 (56.1)	10.0 (50.0)	6.5 (43.7)
Average rainfall mm (inches)	0.0 (0.0)	0.0 (0.0)	0.3 (0.01)	10.3 (0.41)	25.8 (1.02)	51.0 (2.01)	143.8 (5.66)	174.4 (6.87)	84.3 (3.32)	20.3 (0.80)	0.1 (0.00)	0.0 (0.0)	510.3 (20.1)
Average rainy days (≥ 0.1 mm)	0	0	1	3	6	9	13	15	9	3	1	0	60
Average relative humidity (%)	29	23	21	28	39	52	68	76	72	49	33	31	43
Average dew point °C (°F)	4.5 (40.1)	3.9 (39.0)	6.2 (43.2)	13.0 (55.4)	18.2 (64.8)	20.8 (69.4)	22.3 (72.1)	23.0 (73.4)	22.7 (72.9)	18.2 (64.8)	10.3 (50.5)	6.2 (43.2)	14.1 (57.4)
Mean monthly sunshine hours	297.6	277.2	282.1	273.0	285.2	258.0	213.9	201.5	228.0	285.2	300.0	303.8	3,205.5
Mean daily sunshine hours	9.6	9.9	9.1	9.1	9.2	8.6	6.9	6.5	7.6	9.2	10.0	9.8	8.8
Source 1: Météo Climat, World Meteorological Organization (rainfall/rain days)
Source 2: NOAA (sun, humidity 1961–1990 and extremes), Extreme Temperature Around The World

N'Djamena's climate is affected by the collision of two large air masses over Chad, one continental and one maritime, whose interactions can produce unpredictable weather. According to the World Air Quality Report 2024, N'Djamena is one of the world's 20 most polluted cities. The water in the Chari River also contains high levels of some heavy metal contaminants, increasing downstream of the city and during the dry season.

== Economy ==
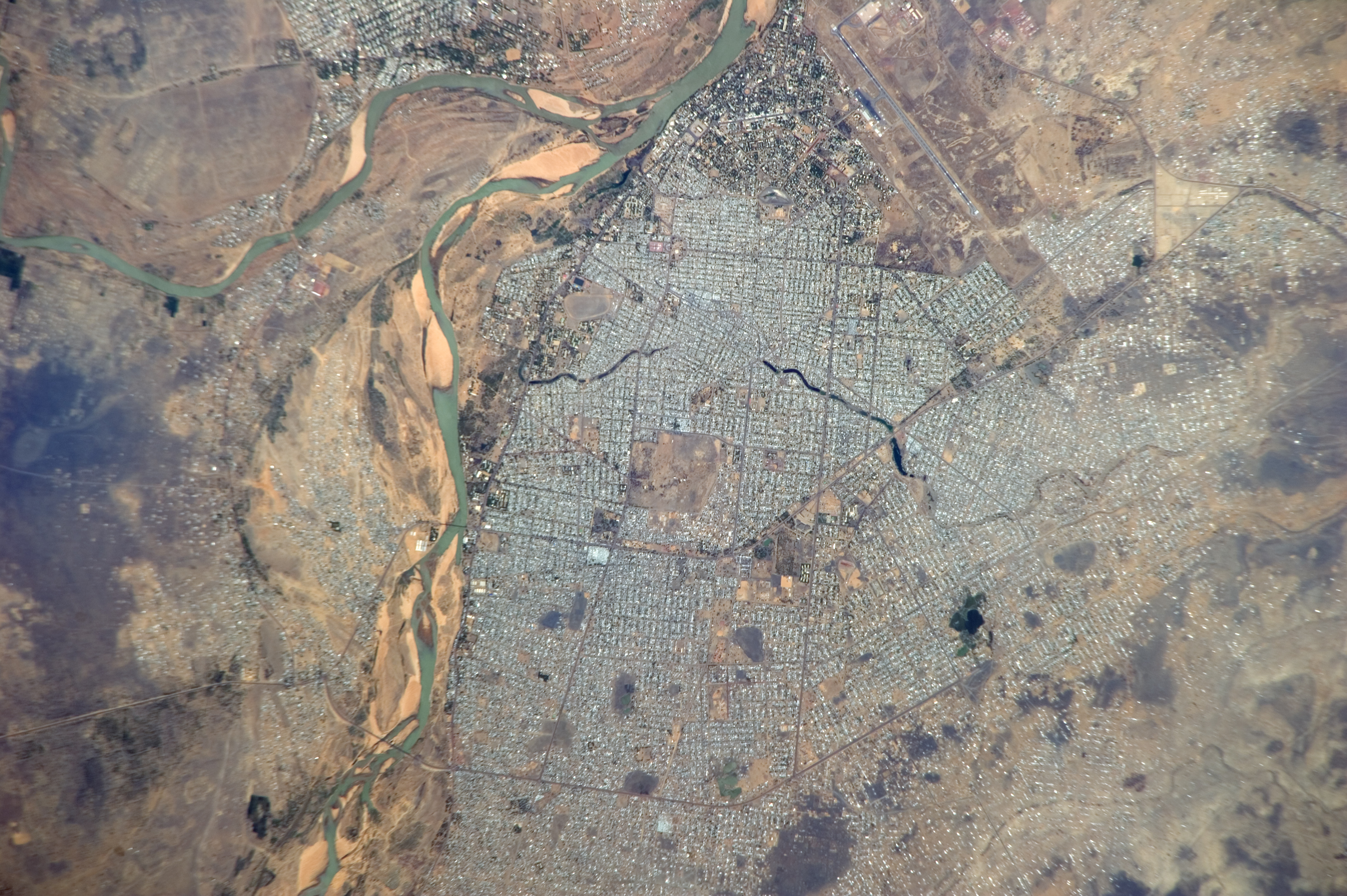
N'Djamena seen from the International Space Station in 2010

N'Djamena's primary economic source is agricultural work. About 80% of the population within N'Djamena works within farming-based industries, including cultivation of crops and growing livestock. The economy in N'Djamena is therefore almost totally reliant on good weather, causing the economy to struggle in years with low rainfall. N'Djamena receives financial aid from the World Bank, as well as the African Development Bank. There is a high demand for skilled laborers within N'Djamena to work for oil and gas sectors, as well as laborers for foreign non-governmental organizations, medical services, and English teaching. Residents of N'Djamena are liable to pay tax up to a maximum amount of 60% of all net income.

== Culture ==
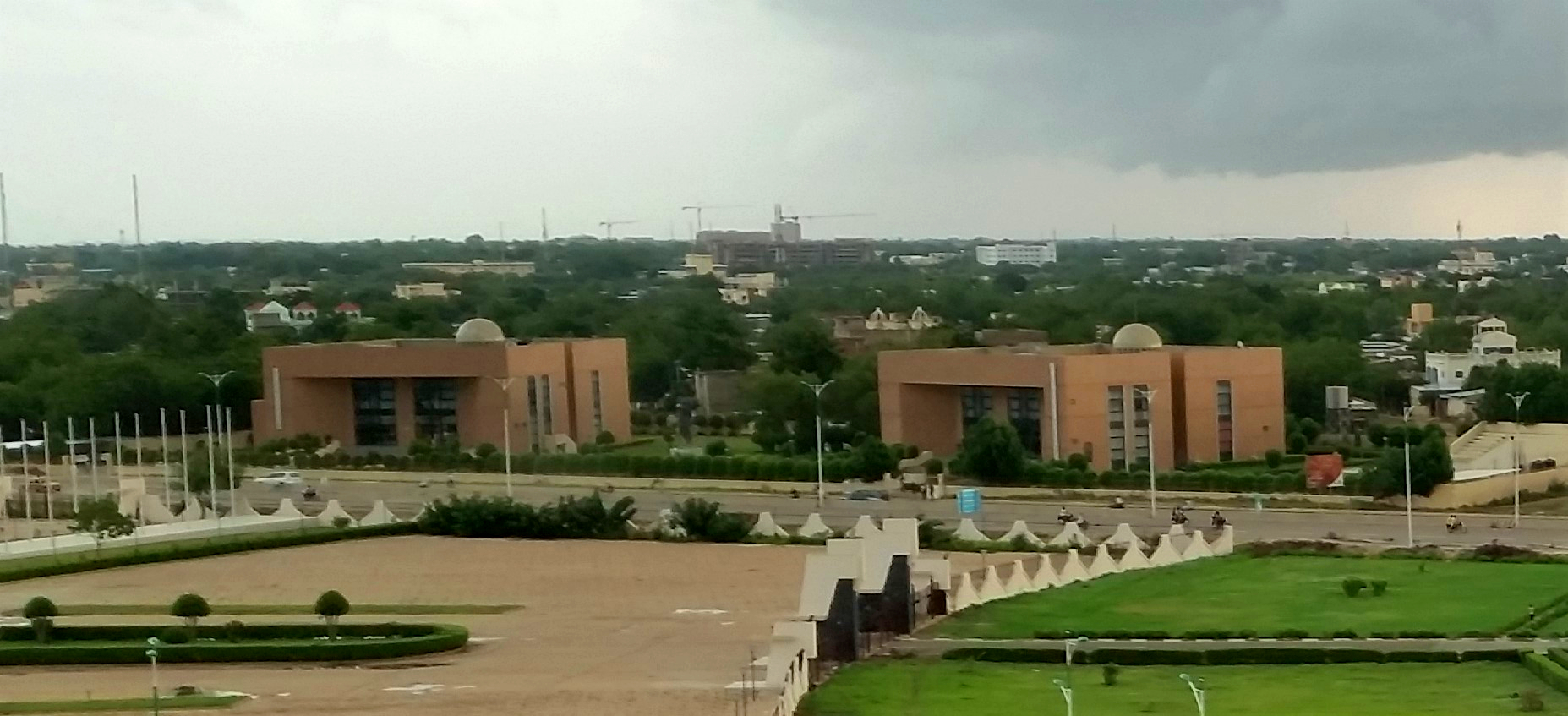
The Chad National Museum and the National Library of Chad

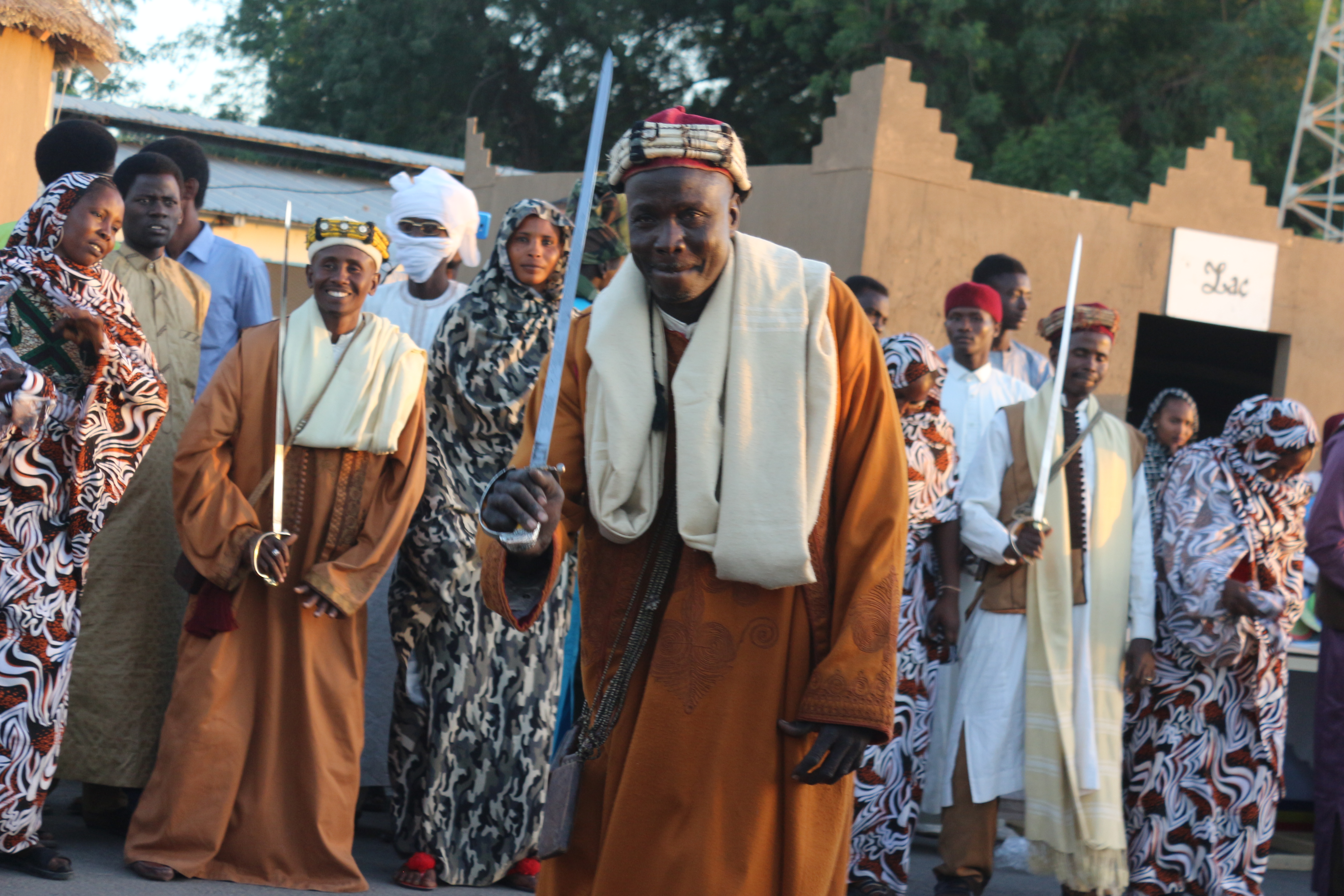
The Dary festival in N'Djamena

Attractions in the city include the Chad National Museum, the Al-Mouna Cultural Center, Our Lady of Peace Cathedral, and several mosques. Within the Chad National Museum, one can view the partial skull of a Sahelanthropus, called "Toumaï" by locals. This skull was discovered in the northern part of Chad and is considered to be that of one of the earliest humans. N'Djamena was named the "Capital of Islamic Culture" for 2009 by the Islamic Educational, Scientific and Cultural Organization.

== Education ==
In N'Djamena, even though primary level education has been compulsory since Chad's independence in 1960, it is often thought of as a luxury. Under forty percent of elementary-age children in Chad have the opportunity to attend classes, and with N'Djamena's poor state stability it is even harder for children to get an education.

Secondary school within Chad is mandatory; however, only 68% of students over the age of 12 attend school. Of that 68%, 70% of these students attend school in N'Djamena. Secondary schools include the long established Lycée Félix Éboué and Lycée Technique Commercial, along with the Lycée Montaigne de N'Djamena (a French international school). Many of the students in international schools are children of executives, diplomats, and non-governmental organization employees. The best secondary school in N'Djamena is College Sacré-Cœur, a public school administered by the Sisters of the Sacred Heart.

N'Djamena has two public universities: the public University of N'Djamena, with French as the primary language of instruction, built in 1971, and the National School of Administration, built in 1963. Private institutions include the King Faisal University in Chad (Université Roi Fayçal), with Arabic as the primary language of instruction, founded 1991-1992, and Emi Koussi University, founded in 2011.

== Places of worship ==
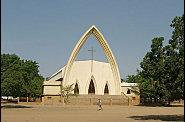
Our Lady of Peace Cathedral

The places of worship are predominantly Muslim mosques. There are also Christian churches and temples of Roman Catholic Archdiocese of N'Djaména, Evangelical Church of Chad, Christian Assemblies in Chad (Plymouth Brethren).

== Government ==
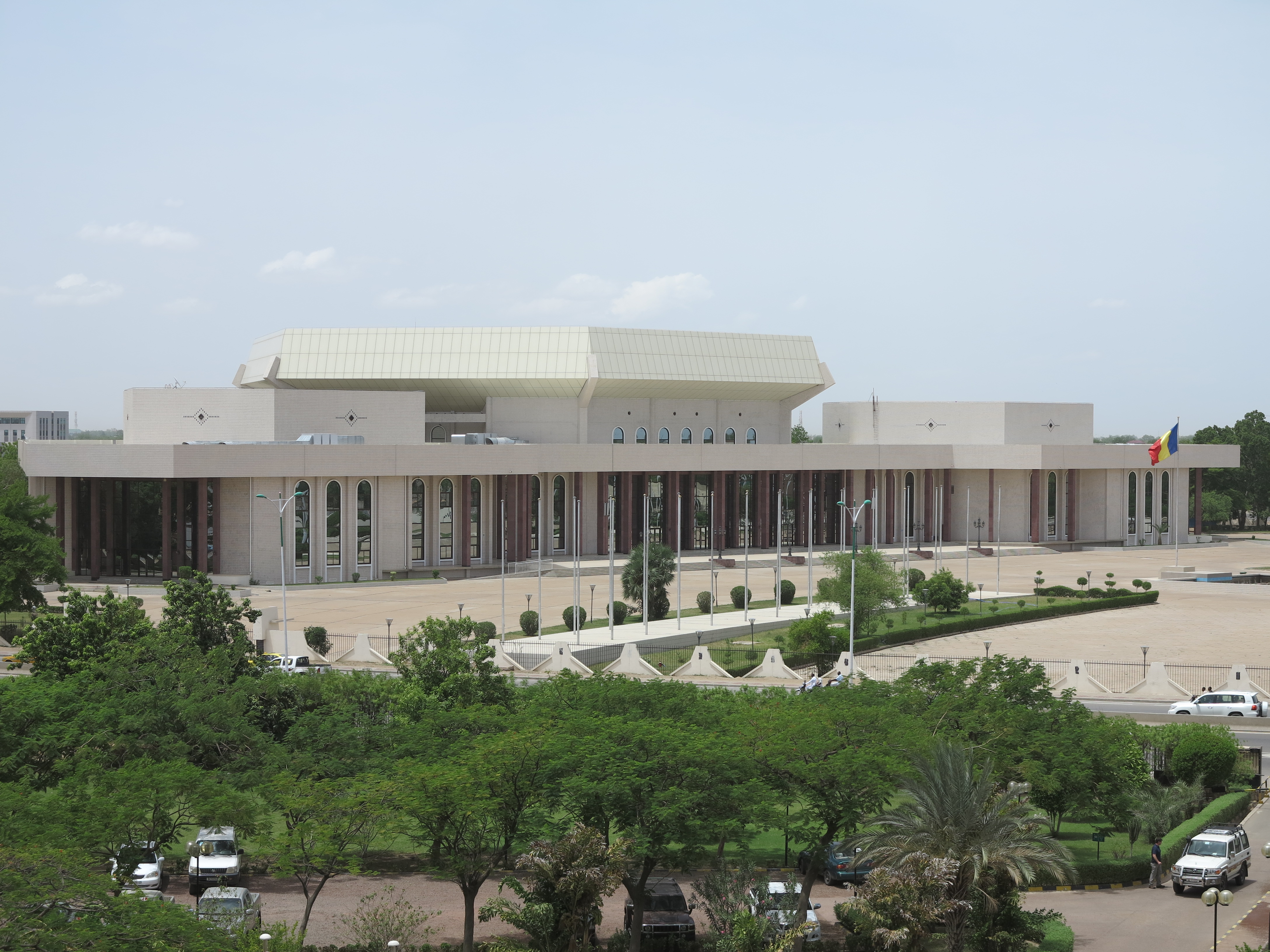
National Assembly of Chad

N'Djamena is the home of the National Assembly of Chad, along with many political organisations and parties, and every national ministry. The Supreme Court and Court of Appeal are also in N'Djamena, along with every major embassy in Chad, including the French and US embassies. It is sometimes considered within the region of Chari-Baguirmi, although separate.

== Transport ==
=== Road ===
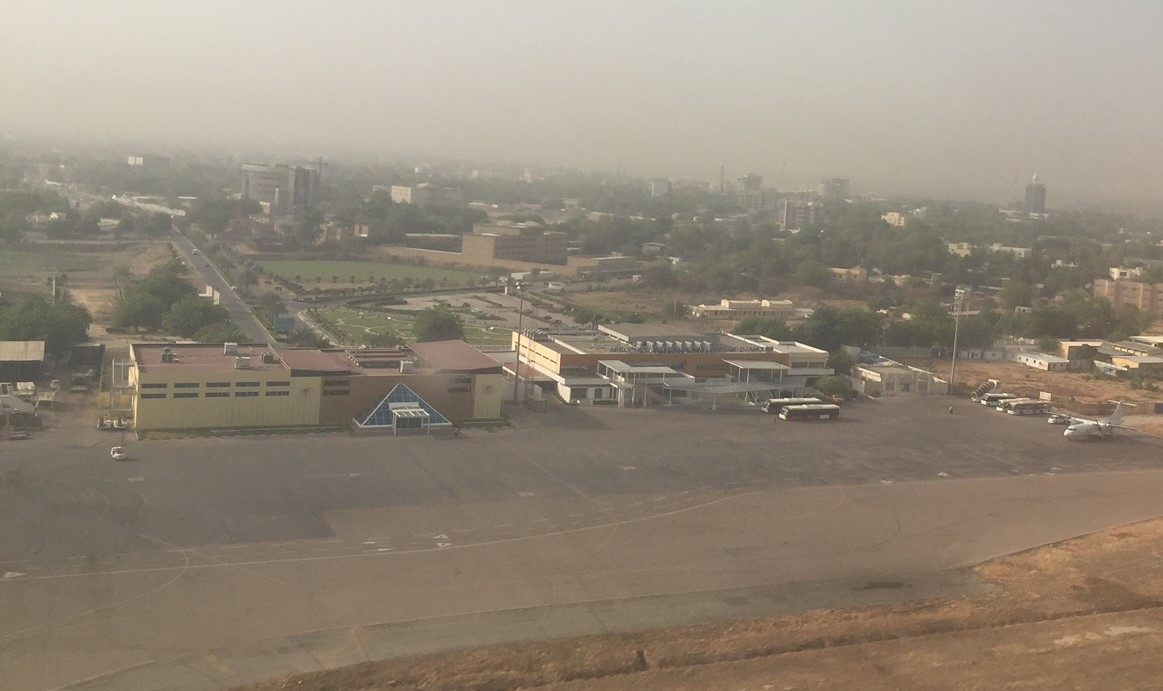
N'Djamena International Airport

The city is the eastern terminus of the Trans-Sahelian Highway, and is linked to East Africa by the (largely unpaved) N'Djamena–Djibouti Highway. The Tripoli-Cape Town Highway also passes through N'Djamena, making it a key Central African location in the Trans-African Highway network. N'Djamena is linked by road bridge to Kousséri in Cameroon.

=== Airport ===
N'Djamena International Airport Hassan Djamous (IATA code NDJ) is located on the outskirts of the city. The airport lists nine passenger destinations served by direct flights: Paris, Istanbul, Sharjah, Cairo, Khartoum, Addis Ababa, Douala, Abuja, and Niamey.

=== River travel ===
Historically, N'Djamena's main link to the exterior was by river boat up the Chari and Logone rivers, but these now carry little trade.

=== Railway ===
The city has no railway links. However, railways have been proposed. In 2011, Chad signed a contract with a Chinese civil engineering group to build a railway to eventually connect N'Djamena to Sudan and Cameroon, as well as other Chadian cities. In 2017, a further feasibility study was funded, but as of 2025, no railroads have been built.

== Twin cities ==
- Toulouse, France; since 1980
- Stupino, Russia; since 2000
