= Edmond Jitangar =

Chadian Roman Catholic bishop (born 1952)

Goetbé Edmond Jitangar
- Archbishop of N'Djaména
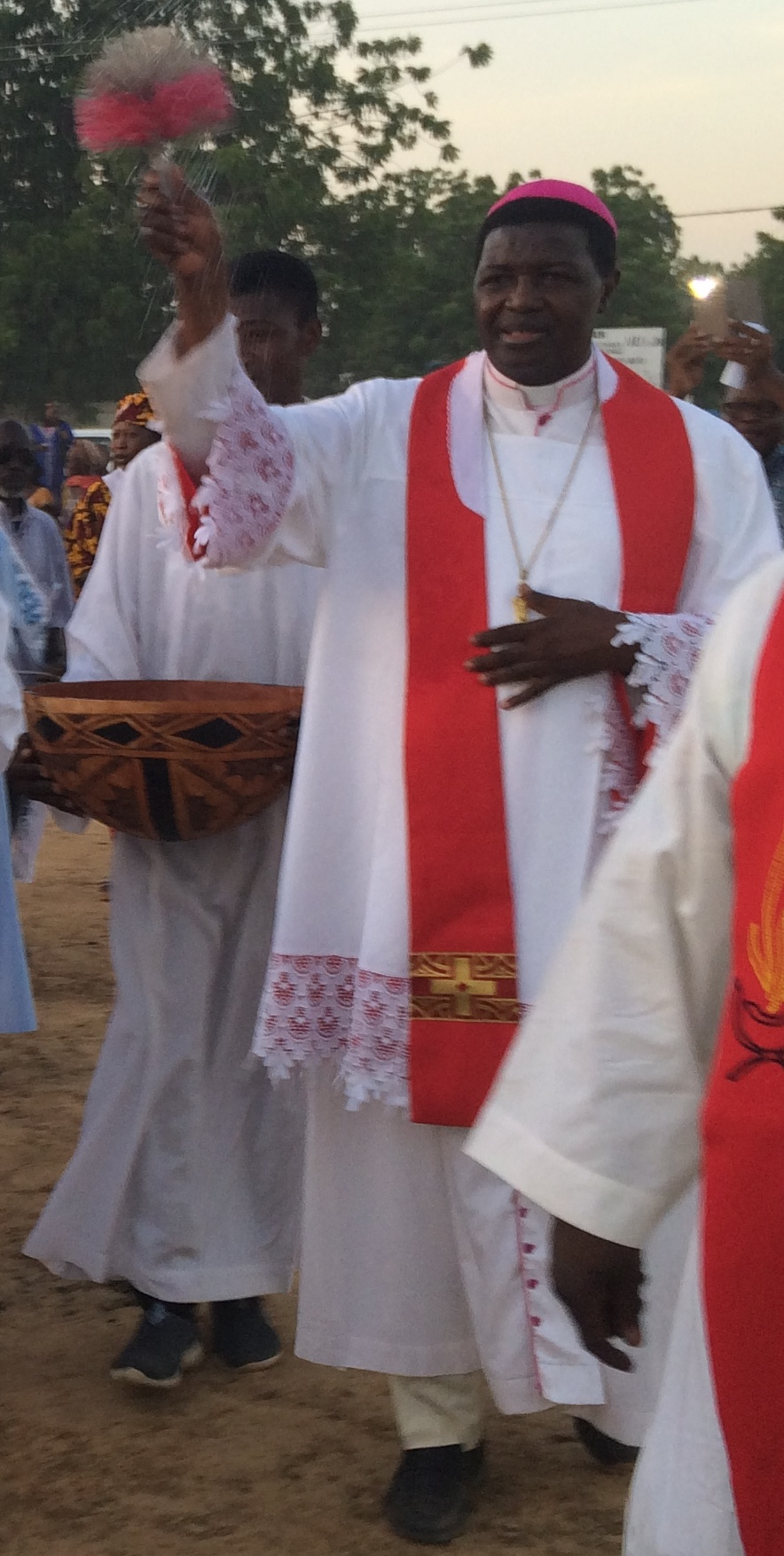
- Jitangar in 2017
- Native name: Goetbé Edmond Djitangar
- Church: Catholic Church
- Archdiocese: Archdiocese of N'Djaména
- Appointed: 20 August 2016
- Predecessor: Matthias N'Gartéri Mayadi
- Previous post: Bishop of Sarh (1991-2016)

Orders
- Ordination: 30 December 1978
- Consecration: 2 February 1992 by Jozef Tomko

Personal details
- Born: 2 November 1952 (age 73) Bokoro, Territory of Chad, French Equatorial Africa, French Empire

Goetbé Edmond Jitangar (born 2 November 1952 in Bokoro, Chad) is a Chadian Roman Catholic bishop. He was Bishop of the Sarh, from 1991 to 2016, and has been Metropolitan Archbishop of N'Djamena since 2016.

== Career ==
Jitangar received the ordination to the priesthood on 30 December 1978. On 11 October 1991, Pope John Paul II named him Bishop of the Sarh. The prefect of the Congregation for the Evangelization of Peoples, Jozef Tomko announced his consecration to bishop. The consecration was completed by the bishop of Mondou, Matthias N'Gartéri Mayadi and the emitted Bishop of Sarh, Henri Veniat SJ.

Bishop Jitangar was named Metropolitan Archbishop-designate of the Roman Catholic Archdiocese of N'Djamena, Chad, by Pope Francis on Saturday, 20 August 2016, following the death of the previous Archbishop in 2013. Jitangar was installed as Metropolitan Archbishop of N'Djamena on 15 October 2016.

Preceded by Matthias N'Gartéri Mayadi	Bishop of Sarh; 1991 - 2016	Succeeded by Miguel Ángel Sebastián Martínez
