= Diocese of Moundou =

Roman Catholic diocese in Chad

Coordinates: 8.5624°N 16.0699°E

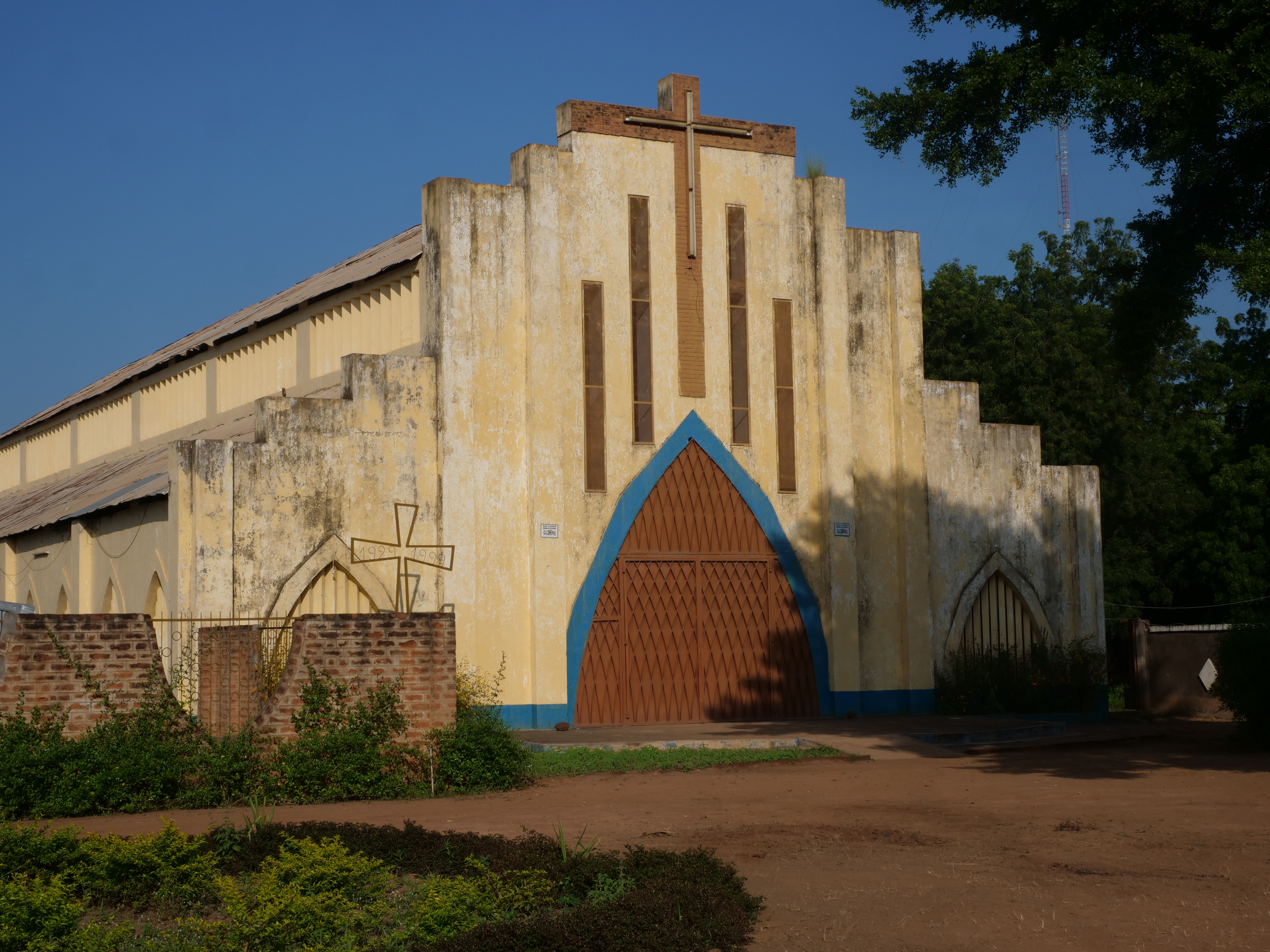
Image of Roman Catholic Diocese of Moundou

The Roman Catholic Diocese of Moundou (Latin: Munduen(sis)) is a diocese in Moundou in the ecclesiastical province of N'Djamena in Chad.

== History ==
- May 17, 1951: Established as Apostolic Prefecture of Moundou from the Apostolic Prefecture of Fort-Lamy and Apostolic Prefecture of Garoua in Cameroon
- February 19, 1959: Promoted as Diocese of Moundou

== Special churches ==
The Cathedral is the Cathédrale du Sacré-Cœur in Moundou.

== Leadership, in reverse chronological order ==
- Bishops of Moundou (Roman rite), below
  - Bishop Joachim Kouraleyo Tarounga (since June 3, 2004)
  - Bishop Matthias N’Gartéri Mayadi (June 11, 1990 – July 31, 2003), appointed Archbishop of N’Djaména
  - Bishop Gabriel (Régis) Balet, OFMCap (March 9, 1985 – September 18, 1989)
  - Bishop Joseph Marie Régis Belzile, OFMCap (December 19, 1974 – March 9, 1985)
  - Bishop Samuel Gaumain, OFMCap (December 19, 1959 – December 19, 1974)
- Prefect Apostolic of Moundou (Roman rite), below
  - Fr. Clément Sirgue, OFMCap (1952 – 1959)

== See also ==
Roman Catholicism in Chad

== Sources ==
- GCatholic.org
