= Félix Perroy =

French Catholic bishop (1866–1931)

The Right Reverend Félix Henri François Donatien Perroy MEP
- Vicar Apostolic of Southern Burma
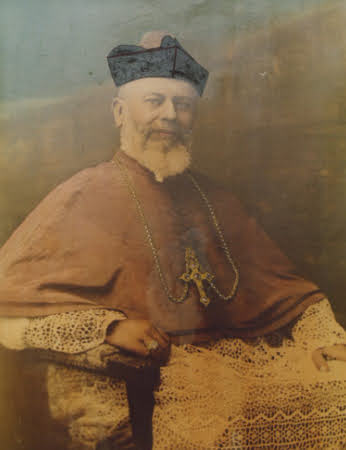
- Installed: 18 October 1925
- Term ended: 10 April 1931
- Predecessor: Alexandre Cardot
- Successor: Frédéric-Marie Provost

Orders
- Ordination: 3 March 1889 as priest
- Consecration: 18 January 1921 by Alexandre Cardot

Personal details
- Born: 31 May 1866 Talmont-Saint-Hilaire, France
- Died: 10 April 1931 (aged 64) Thonze, Burma
- Buried: St Mary's Cathedral, Rangoon
- Denomination: Roman Catholic

Félix Henri François Donatien Perroy MEP (31 May 1866 – 10 April 1931) was a French Catholic missionary and bishop who served as Vicar Apostolic of Southern Burma from 1925 to 1931.

== Biography ==
Perroy was born on 31 May 1866 in Talmont-Saint-Hilaire, France. He was educated at the School of the Brothers of Saint Gabriel and at the seminaries of Sables d'Olonne and Luçon. He entered the Société des Missions Etrangères in September 1888, and was ordained a priest on 3 March 1889.

Perroy was sent as a missionary to southern Burma on 1 May 1889. After arriving in Rangoon, he was sent to Bassein to carry out missionary work and learn English and Burmese under Fr D'Cruz. After a severe attack of dysentery Bishop Bigandet recalled him to Rangoon where he recovered his health. After six months recuperation, he was sent to Thonze in May 1890 to assist the head of the mission and later that year took over the post. He soon built a large, sturdy church in the town to replace the small wooden church.

Perroy, described as a skilled educator who spent much of his time teaching, founded several schools including the Anglo-Burmese school, an industrial school, a teacher training college, and a convent for native nuns. In recognition of his services to education, the British government awarded him the Kaisar-i-Hind Medal in the 1912 Birthday Honours, and commissioned him to prepare a curriculum for use in Burma's primary schools and examination questions for all Burma's teacher training colleges.

In 1920, Perroy was appointed coadjutor to Bishop Cardot, Vicar Apostolic of Southern Burma, whose health was declining, and took charge of the administration of the vicariate. On 11 May 1920, he was appointed titular Bishop of Médéa and was consecrated bishop on 18 January 1921. On the death of Bishop Cardot he succeeded to the position of Vicar Apostolic of Southern Burma on 18 October 1925. During the following years he became increasingly unwell, and in 1929 a coadjutor, Frédéric-Marie Provost, was appointed to administer the mission. Perroy retired to Thonze where he died on 10 April 1931. He was buried in the crypt of St Mary's Cathedral in Rangoon.
