= Raymond Saw Po Ray =

Burmese Roman Catholic prelate (1948–2025)

His Excellency Raymond Saw Po Ray
- Bishop Emeritus of Mawlamyine
- Archdiocese: Yangon
- Diocese: Mawlamyine
- Appointed: 22 March 1993
- Installed: 27 May 1993
- Term ended: 31 May 2023
- Predecessor: First
- Successor: Maurice Nyunt Wai
- Previous posts: Auxiliary Bishop of Rangoon and Titular Bishop of Buffada (1987–1993)

Orders
- Ordination: 13 April 1975
- Consecration: 8 December 1987 by Gabriel Thohey Mahn-Gaby

Personal details
- Born: 11 August 1948 Mergui, Burma
- Died: 6 January 2025 (aged 76)

Raymond Saw Po Ray (11 August 1948 – 6 January 2025) was a Burmese Roman Catholic prelate. He was auxiliary bishop of Yangon (1987–1993) and bishop of Mawlamyine (1993–2023). Saw Po Ray died on 6 January 2025, at the age of 76.

Catholic Church titles
Preceded by First	Bishop of Mawlamyine; 1993–2023	Succeeded by Maurice Nyunt Wai
Preceded by Joseph Kyeong Kap-ryong	Titular Bishop of Buffada; 1987–1993	Succeeded by Alexander Sye Cheong-duk
Preceded by —	Auxiliary Bishop of Rangoon; 1987–1993	Succeeded by —
