= Sein Hlaing =

Burmese footballer

Sein Hlaing စိန်လှိုင်
Personal information
- Full name: Sein Hlaing
- Date of birth: 10 November 1918
- Place of birth: Rangoon, British Burma
- Date of death: 7 May 2010 (aged 91)
- Position: Right midfielder

Senior career*
Years	Team	Apps	(Gls)
1938–1939	Seven Stars FC		
1940	Friends Union FC		

International career
1940	Burma		

Managerial career
- 1952–1962: Criminal Investigation Department FC
- 1962–1979: Burma youth
- 1964–1965: Burma
- 1967–1972: Burma
- 1974–1979: Burma
- * Club domestic league appearances and goals

Sein Hlaing (Burmese: စိန်လှိုင်, pronounced [sèiɰ̃ l̥àiɰ̃]; 10 November 1918 – 7 May 2010) was a Burmese football player and coach, regarded as being the most successful coach in the history of the national team. Sein Hlaing was awarded FIFA Order of Merit in 2004 in recognition of his achievements as a coach.

== Biography ==
Sein Hlaing was born in Tamwe township in Yangon to Daw Su and U Yeit. He attended Myoma National High School. He began playing football at a young age and appeared for the Seven Stars club while still at high school in 1938. Later in 1940, he played for the Friends Union club in Burma's top level of club football as well as the Burma national team as a right midfielder.

After his playing career ended, he took up his first coaching post with the Criminal Investigation Department club in 1952. After serving as coach with this club for ten years, he was appointed coach of the Burma national youth team in 1962. During his tenure as coach, the youth team enjoyed success - winning the Asian Under 20 tournament twice outright, and four more times shared with other teams.

From 1964, he was also coach of the full national team. He coached the national team to victory in the Asian Football Championships in 1966 and 1970 and in the Southeast Asian Games tournaments in 1967, 1969, 1971 and 1973. Burma shared the title with Thailand in 1965. This is the most successful period in Burmese football history.

He coached the team that qualified for, and played in the 1972 Olympic Games where, despite being eliminated in the first round, the Burmese team won the Fair Play award. He continued to coach the national team until retiring in 1979.

In 2004, he was awarded the Centennial Order of Merit by FIFA in recognition of his achievements as a coach.

=== Death ===
Sein Hlaing died of complications from diabetes on 7 May 2010 at his home at 42nd St, Botataung Township in Yangon.

== Achievements ==
The following is a list of championships achieved under his leadership.

- Asian Games: 1966, 1970 (co-champion with South Korea)
- SEA Games: 1965 (with Thailand), 1967, 1969, 1971, 1973
- Merdeka Cup: 1964, 1967 (with South Korea), 1971
- AFC U-19 Championship: 1963 (with S Korea), 1964 (with Israel), 1966 (with Israel), 1968, 1969 (with Thailand), 1970
