= Archdiocese of Yangon =

Latin Catholic ecclesiastical jurisdiction in Myanmar

Coordinates: 16°46′42″N 96°10′00″E

Archdiocese of Yangon Archidioecesis Yangonensis
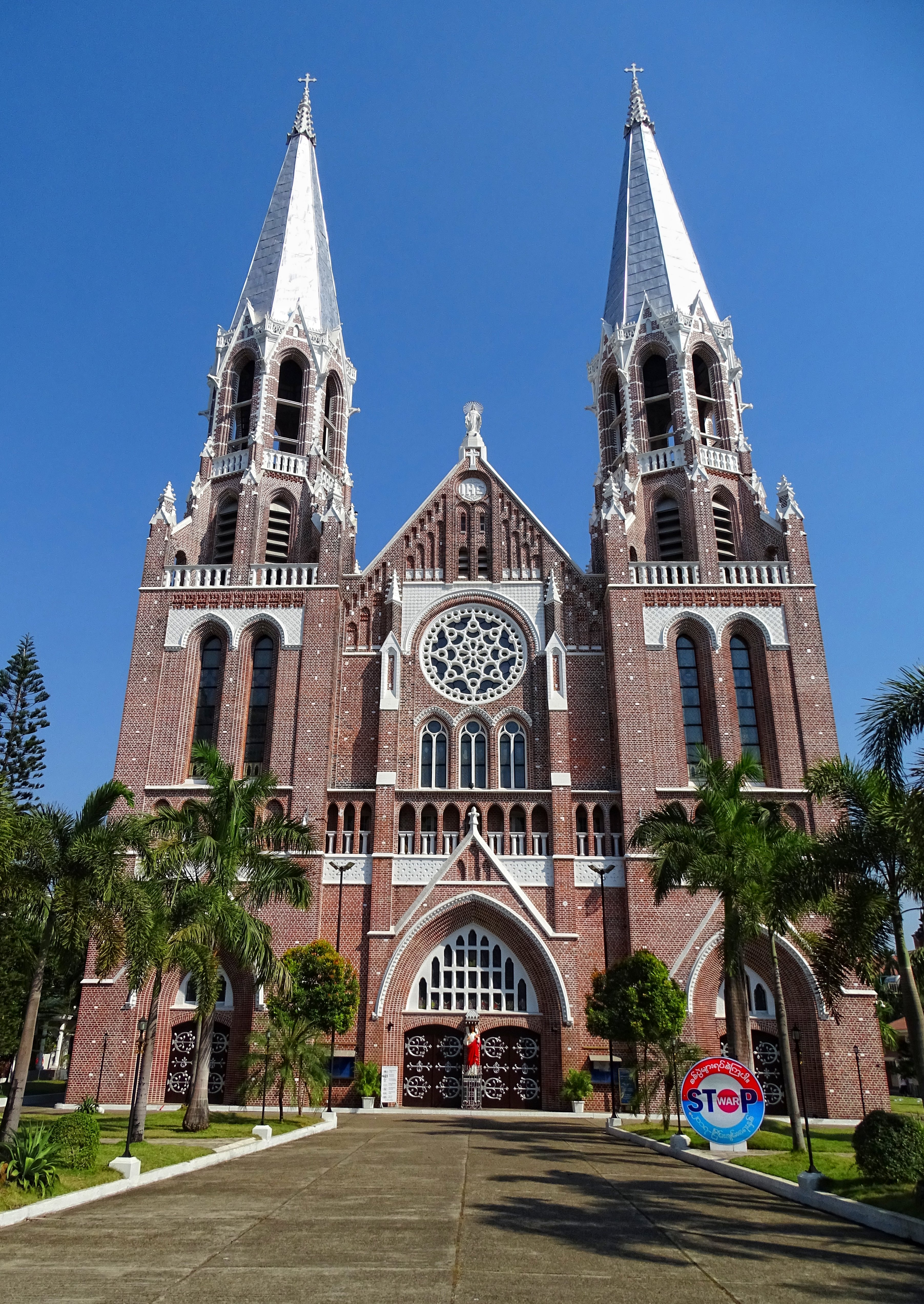
- Saint Mary's Cathedral, Yangon

Location
- Country: Myanmar
- Ecclesiastical province: Yangon

Statistics
- Area: 68,000 km^{2} (26,000 sq mi)
- Population: Total; Catholics: (as of 2010); 14,050,000; 76,283 (0.5%)

Information
- Denomination: Catholic Church
- Sui iuris church: Latin Church
- Rite: Roman Rite
- Cathedral: Cathedral of the Immaculate Conception in Yangon

Current leadership
- Pope: Leo XIV
- Metropolitan Archbishop: Charles Maung Bo
- Suffragans: Diocese of Hpa-an; Diocese of Mawlamyine; Diocese of Pathein; Diocese of Pyay
- Auxiliary Bishops: Noel Saw Naw Aye; Francis Than Htun; Raymond Wai Lin Htun

The Archdiocese of Yangon (Latin: Archidioecesis Yangonensis) is a Latin Church ecclesiastical territory or diocese of the Catholic Church in Myanmar. Charles Bo, SDB was appointed Archbishop of Yangon by Pope John Paul II on May 24, 2003.

== History ==
The diocese was erected as the Apostolic Vicariate of Southwestern Burma by Pope Pius IX on November 27, 1866, and renamed as the Southern Burma on July 19, 1870 and later as the Apostolic Vicariate of Rangoon on May 7, 1953. It was elevated to the rank of a metropolitan archdiocese by Pope Pius XII on January 1, 1955, with the suffragan sees of Mawlamyine, Pathein, Pyay and Hpa-an which was newly erected on 24 January 2009. Pope John Paul II renamed it as the Archdiocese of Yangon on October 8, 1991.

The archdiocese's motherchurch and thus seat of its archbishop is St. Mary's Cathedral.

Incumbent	Term start	Term Finish	Notes
Paul Ambroise Bigandet MEP	12 August 1870	13 March 1894	Died
Alexandre Cardot MEP	19 March 1894	18 October 1925	Died
Félix-Donatien Perroy MEP	18 October 1925	10 April 1931	Died
Frédéric-Marie Provost MEP	10 April 1931	27 September 1952	Died
Victor Bazin MEP	7 May 1953	19 June 1971	Resigned
Gabriel Thohey Mahn-Gaby	19 June 1971	30 September 2002	Retired
Charles Maung Bo SDB	22 November 2003		

== Statistics ==
As of 16 July 2007 there are 83 priests and 312 religious in the archdiocese.

== See also ==
- Catholic Church in Myanmar
- List of Catholic dioceses in Myanmar
