= Sann =

Sann or SANN may refer to:

== Places ==
- Sann, Sindh, a town in Pakistan
  - Sann railway station
- Sann Gate, a location in the Ranikot Fort near Sann, Sindh
- Savinja, formerly known by the German name Sann, a river in Slovenia

== People ==
- Sann Myint (born 1952), Burmese weightlifter
- Sann Satt Naing (born 1997), Burmese footballer
- Sann Win, Burmese football coach
- Son Sann (1911–2000), Cambodian politician

== Other uses ==
- Southern Arizona News Network, a 24-hour TV network operated by KVOA in Tucson, Arizona, U.S.
- SANN: Sylvain Auclair Norman Nawrocki, a 2005 album by Sylvain Auclair and Norman Nawrocki
