= Alexandre Cardot =

French bishop (1857–1925)

The Right Reverend Alexandre Cardot MEP
- Vicar Apostolic of Southern Burma
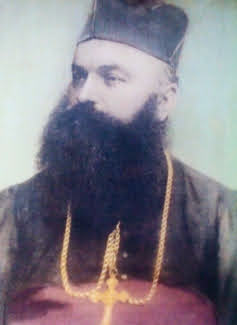
- Installed: 19 March 1894
- Term ended: 18 October 1925
- Predecessor: Paul Ambroise Bigandet
- Successor: Félix-Donatien Perroy

Orders
- Ordination: 20 September 1879 as priest
- Consecration: 24 June 1893 by Paul Ambroise Bigandet

Personal details
- Born: 10 January 1857 Fresse, France
- Died: 18 October 1925 (aged 68) Moulmein, Burma
- Denomination: Roman Catholic

Alexandre Cardot MEP (10 January 1857 – 18 October 1925) was a French Catholic missionary and bishop who served as Vicar Apostolic of Southern Burma from 1894 to 1925.

== Biography ==
Cardot was born on 10 January 1857 in Fresse, France. He joined the Société des Missions Etrangères and was ordained priest at the Foreign Missions church in Paris in 1879.

Cardot was sent as a missionary to Burma and arrived in 1879. On 21 March 1893, he was appointed coadjutor to Bishop Bigandet and titular Bishop of Limyra, and on 24 June 1893 he was consecrated Bishop by Bishop Bigandet in Rangoon. On the death of Bishop Bigandet on 19 March 1894, he succeeded to the vicariate as Vicar Apostolic of Southern Burma (the Archdiocese of Yangon since 1991).

Cardot was responsible for the completion of St. Mary's Cathedral, Rangoon on the site chosen by Bishop Bigandet. Cardot commissioned Dutch architect, Joseph Cuypers to design the cathedral and construction was supervised in Rangoon by Fr Janzen whom Cardot had met on a visit to France. The foundation stone was laid in 1899, and construction was completed in 1909. The cathedral was consecrated by Cardot on 22 November 1909.

Cardot died on 18 October 1925 at Moulmein, Burma, aged 68.
