= Diocese of Hpa-an =

Diocese of Hpa-an may refer to:

- the Catholic Diocese of Hpa-an of the Catholic Church in Myanmar
- the Anglican Diocese of Hpa-an of the Church of the Province of Myanmar
