= Bo Aung Kyaw Street =

Street in Yangon, Myanmar

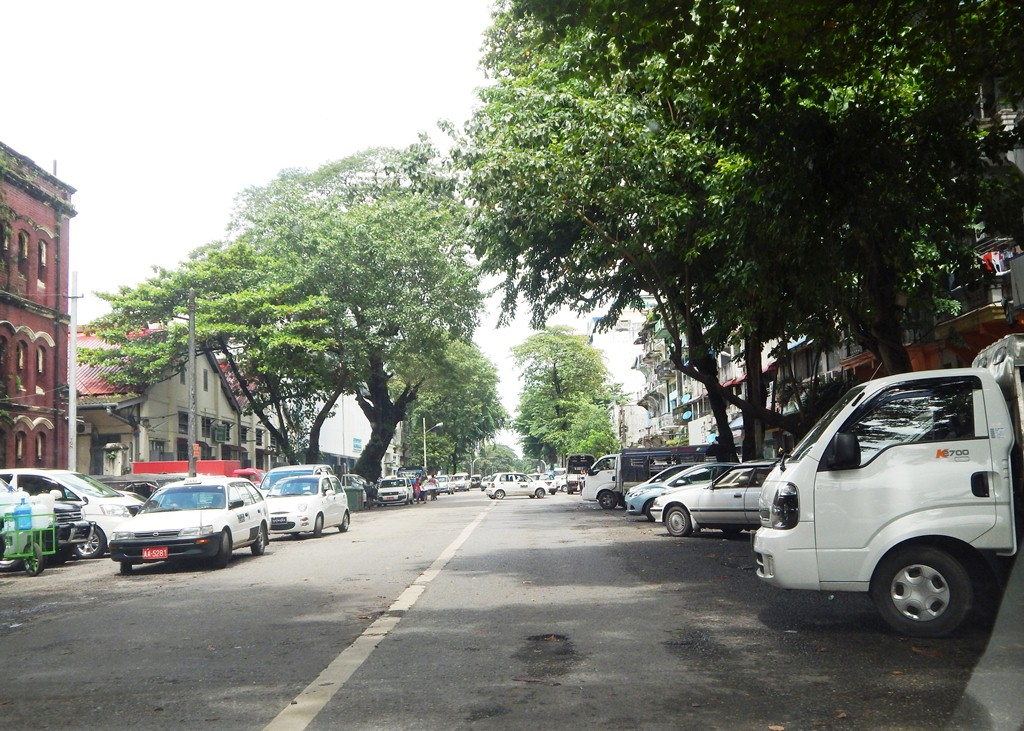
Bo Aung Kyaw Street

Bo Aung Kyaw Street or Road, formerly Sparks Street is a major street, passing south–north through Kyauktada Township and Botataung Township in southern Yangon, Burma. The street begins at an intersection near the Yangon River with Strand Road at 16°46′9″N 96°9′51″E, passes north and crosses Maha Bandula Road and Anawrahta Road before eventually joining Bogyoke Aung San Road at 16°46′44″N 96°9′52″E.

A number of historical buildings are located on the street including Saint Mary's Cathedral (located at the very north of the street on the corner with Bogyoke Aung San Road) and Sri Sri Durba Bari Hindu Temple. It is also a major business street; several Burmese airlines and travel companies have their headquarters along this street, as does The Myanmar Times and the Burmese Central Post Office, located at 39-41 Bo Aung Kyaw Street. It also has several hotels, such as Aye Yar Hotel located at 170/176 Bo Aung Kyaw Street.
