= Diocese of Mawlamyine =

Latin Catholic diocese in Myanmar

Coordinates: 16.4782°N 97.6247°E

Diocese of Mawlamyine Dioecesis Maulamyinensis
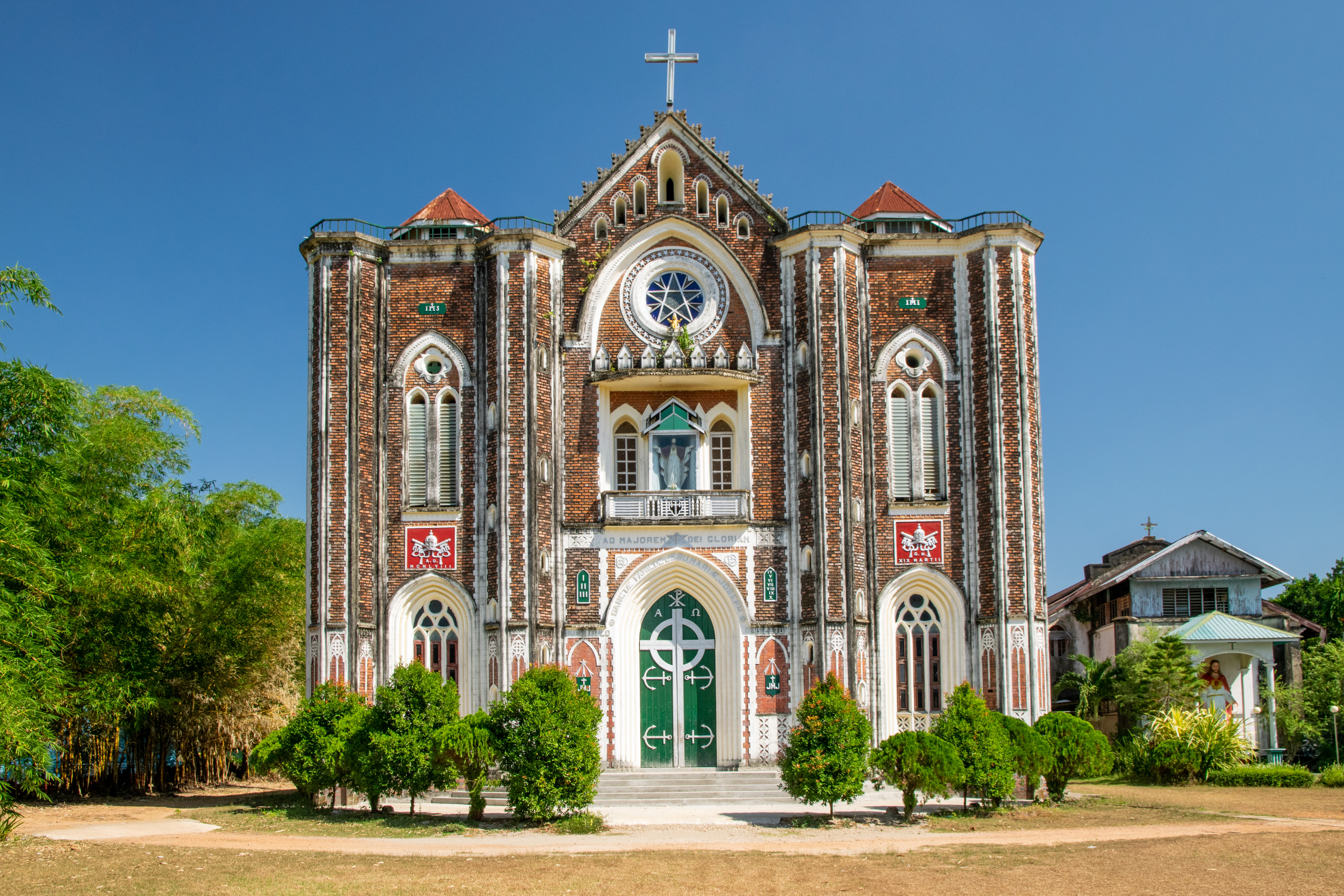
- Holy Family Cathedral in the Diocese of Mawlamyine.

Location
- Country: Myanmar
- Ecclesiastical province: Yangon
- Metropolitan: Yangon

Statistics
- Area: 51,780 km^{2} (19,990 sq mi)
- Population: Total; Catholics: (as of 2004); 2,621,889; 7,771 (0.3%)

Information
- Denomination: Catholic Church
- Sui iuris church: Latin Church
- Rite: Roman Rite
- Established: 22 March 1993
- Cathedral: Holy Family Cathedral in Mawlamyine

Current leadership
- Pope: Leo XIV
- Bishop: Maurice Nyun Wai
- Metropolitan Archbishop: Charles Maung Bo

The Diocese of Mawlamyine (Lat: Diocesis Maulamyinensis) is a diocese of the Catholic Church in Burma.

The diocese was erected in 1993, from its metropolitan, the Archdiocese of Yangon.

== Ordinaries ==
- Raymond Saw Po Ray (22 March 1993 – 31 May 2023)
- Maurice Nyun Wai (31 May 2023 – present)

== See also ==
- Catholic Church in Burma
