= Myanmar national football team results =

The following is a list of results of the Myanmar national football team (known as Burma till 1989).

== Head-to-head record ==
As of 27 September 2026 after the match against the Cambodia.

| Team | Confederation | Pld | W | D | L | GF | GA | GD |
|---|---|---|---|---|---|---|---|---|
| Afghanistan | AFC | 2 | 2 | 0 | 0 | 4 | 2 | +2 |
| Bahrain | AFC | 4 | 1 | 0 | 3 | 6 | 11 | –5 |
| Bangladesh | AFC | 11 | 6 | 1 | 4 | 24 | 13 | +11 |
| Brunei | AFC | 8 | 7 | 0 | 1 | 28 | 5 | +23 |
| Bolivia | CONMEBOL | 1 | 0 | 0 | 1 | 0 | 3 | –3 |
| Burundi | CAF | 1 | 0 | 0 | 1 | 1 | 2 | –1 |
| Cambodia | AFC | 22 | 16 | 1 | 5 | 59 | 17 | +42 |
| China | AFC | 9 | 2 | 0 | 7 | 4 | 28 | –24 |
| Chinese Taipei | AFC | 7 | 1 | 4 | 2 | 9 | 10 | –1 |
| Guam | AFC | 2 | 2 | 0 | 0 | 11 | 1 | +10 |
| India | AFC | 22 | 8 | 4 | 10 | 40 | 31 | +9 |
| Indonesia | AFC | 43 | 17 | 9 | 18 | 65 | 74 | –9 |
| Iran | AFC | 5 | 2 | 0 | 3 | 4 | 7 | –3 |
| Iraq | AFC | 4 | 0 | 0 | 4 | 1 | 13 | –12 |
| Israel | UEFA | 2 | 1 | 0 | 1 | 1 | 3 | –2 |
| Japan | AFC | 13 | 1 | 3 | 9 | 7 | 37 | –30 |
| North Korea | AFC | 7 | 0 | 1 | 6 | 4 | 25 | –21 |
| South Korea | AFC | 34 | 8 | 9 | 17 | 19 | 44 | –25 |
| Kuwait | AFC | 6 | 2 | 0 | 4 | 8 | 21 | –17 |
| Kyrgyzstan | AFC | 4 | 0 | 2 | 2 | 4 | 9 | –5 |
| Laos | AFC | 19 | 16 | 3 | 0 | 63 | 13 | +50 |
| Lebanon | AFC | 3 | 0 | 1 | 2 | 3 | 6 | –3 |
| Lesotho | CAF | 1 | 1 | 0 | 0 | 1 | 0 | +1 |
| Libya | CAF | 1 | 1 | 0 | 0 | 3 | 1 | +2 |
| Luxembourg | UEFA | 1 | 1 | 0 | 0 | 2 | 0 | +2 |
| Macau | AFC | 5 | 4 | 1 | 0 | 14 | 1 | +13 |
| Malaysia | AFC | 55 | 21 | 10 | 24 | 73 | 92 | –19 |
| Maldives | AFC | 4 | 4 | 0 | 0 | 12 | 4 | +8 |
| Mongolia | AFC | 4 | 2 | 0 | 2 | 4 | 2 | +2 |
| Morocco | CAF | 1 | 0 | 1 | 0 | 2 | 2 | 0 |
| Nepal | AFC | 5 | 4 | 1 | 0 | 10 | 0 | +10 |
| New Zealand | OFC | 3 | 0 | 2 | 1 | 2 | 4 | –2 |
| Oman | AFC | 3 | 0 | 0 | 3 | 0 | 8 | –8 |
| Pakistan | AFC | 10 | 5 | 2 | 3 | 16 | 11 | +5 |
| Palestine | AFC | 3 | 1 | 0 | 2 | 5 | 6 | –1 |
| Philippines | AFC | 18 | 10 | 5 | 3 | 40 | 19 | +25 |
| Qatar | AFC | 1 | 0 | 1 | 0 | 2 | 2 | 0 |
| Russia^ | UEFA | 1 | 0 | 0 | 1 | 0 | 1 | –1 |
| Singapore | AFC | 41 | 15 | 8 | 18 | 85 | 65 | +20 |
| Sri Lanka | AFC | 9 | 8 | 0 | 1 | 27 | 10 | +17 |
| Syria | AFC | 4 | 0 | 1 | 3 | 2 | 16 | –14 |
| Tajikistan | AFC | 3 | 1 | 0 | 2 | 4 | 7 | –3 |
| Thailand | AFC | 51 | 14 | 14 | 23 | 62 | 101 | –39 |
| Timor-Leste | AFC | 3 | 3 | 0 | 0 | 8 | 0 | +8 |
| Turkmenistan | AFC | 1 | 0 | 0 | 1 | 1 | 2 | –1 |
| United Arab Emirates | AFC | 1 | 0 | 0 | 1 | 0 | 2 | –2 |
| Vietnam^^ | AFC | 28 | 11 | 3 | 14 | 35 | 61 | –26 |
| Total | | 99 | 35 | 18 | 38 | 97 | 152 | –55 |

^ includes the results of Soviet Union
^^ includes the results of South Vietnam

| Preceded by 1962 India | Asian Games Champions; 1966 (first title); 1970 (second title) | Succeeded by 1974 Iran |
