= Myanmar national football team =

National football team representing Myanmar

Myanmar
- Nickname: Chinthe
- Association: Myanmar Football Federation (MFF)
- Confederation: AFC (Asia)
- Sub-confederation: AFF (Southeast Asia)
- Head coach: Jørn Andersen
- Captain: Maung Maung Lwin
- Most caps: Maung Maung Lwin (96)
- Top scorer: Myo Hlaing Win (45)
- Home stadium: Thuwunna Stadium
- FIFA code: MYA
First colours	Second colours

FIFA ranking
- Current: 159 (18 November 2026)
- Highest: 96 (April 1996)
- Lowest: 182 (August 2012, October 2012)

First international
- Hong Kong 5–2 Burma (Hong Kong; 17 February 1950)

Biggest win
- Burma 9–0 Singapore (Kuala Lumpur, Malaysia; 9 November 1969)

Biggest defeat
- Japan 10–0 Myanmar (Chiba, Japan; 28 May 2021)

Asian Cup
- Appearances: 1 (first in 1968)
- Best result: Runners-up (1968)

AFC Challenge Cup
- Appearances: 3 (first in 2008)
- Best result: Fourth place (2008, 2010)

AFF Championship
- Appearances: 13 (first in 1996)
- Best result: Fourth place (2004); Semi-finals (2016)

ASEAN Challenge Cup
- Appearances: 1 (first in 2026)
- Best result: Group stage (2026)
Medal record
Men's football
AFC Asian Cup
Silver medal – second place	1968 Iran	Team
Asian Games
Gold medal – first place	1966 Thailand	Team
Gold medal – first place	1970 Thailand	Team
Bronze medal – third place	1954 Philippines	Team
Southeast Asian Games
Gold medal – first place	1965 Malaysia	Team
Gold medal – first place	1967 Thailand	Team
Gold medal – first place	1969 Burma	Team
Gold medal – first place	1971 Malaysia	Team
Gold medal – first place	1973 Singapore	Team
Silver medal – second place	1961 Burma	Team
Silver medal – second place	1993 Singapore	Team
Bronze medal – third place	1975 Thailand	Team
Bronze medal – third place	1977 Malaysia	Team

The Myanmar national football team (Burmese: မြန်မာ့လက်ရွေးစင်ဘောလုံးအသင်း) represents Myanmar in men's international association football and is governed by the Myanmar Football Federation. The team has been affiliated with FIFA since 1952 and a member of AFC since 1954.

== History ==
=== Early years (1937–1951) ===
In 1937, East Bengal of Calcutta toured Burma. They would play against a Burmese selected team on October 13, being defeated 6–0. The following year, a Burmese XI toured India. This is one of the first documented national side of Burma, the tour also included Fred Pugsley, who was the first Burmese player to play for a foreign club. The team played a total of three matches, they defeated a Mohun Bagan–Calcutta XI by 3–2 on 28 May with Pugsley scoring twice and Dad netting in the other goal. The team also played against the India XI on 30 May which ended in a 2–2 draw with Pugsley scoring a brace.

After Independence, Burma would once again tour India, playing three matches against the I.F.A. XI. The first match was held on 24 August 1948, against I.F.A. XI, the match would end in a 1–1 draw, with Pugsley opening the scoring, and A. Mukherjee scoring the equaliser. Two days would follow for the second match, in which Burma would defeat the opposition by 2–1. Boomgardt would find the net twice to secure the win. The final match of the tour was held on 28 August, and ended in a 1–1 draw. After the tour concluded, the following day, a special arrangement was organized to celebrate Fred Pugsley, the team which was named "Fred Pugsley XI", would defeat East Bengal 2–0, with goals from Gwan Shein and Chan Sein.

=== The Golden Era (1952–1973) ===
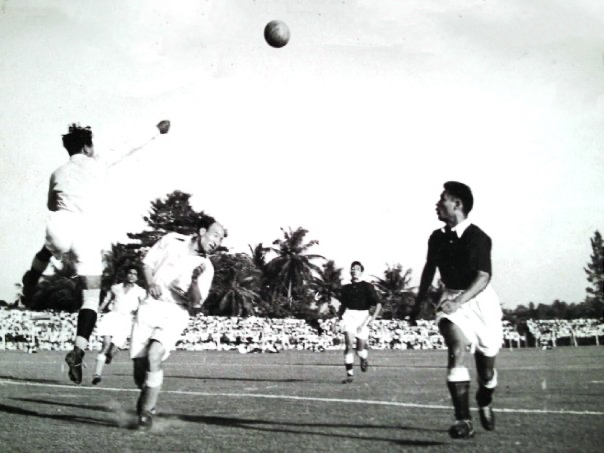
Burma and Pakistan at the 1952 Asian Quadrangular Football Tournament.

In 1952, Burma played in the 1st Asian Quadrangular Football Tournament, held at Colombo, Ceylon. In the tournament, the team played their first match against India, losing 0–4, then facing off against Pakistan, where they lost by a goal. The third match against hosts Ceylon was cancelled due to the death of Ceylon's Prime Minister Mr. Don Stephen Senanayake. The team finished third place in the tournament behind Pakistan and India. Burma also played at the 1953, 1954, and 1955 editions of the tournament.

In 1954, Burma participated at the 1954 Asian Games and won a bronze medal, standing behind Taiwan and South Korea. On the other hand, the nation was not expected to contend for a medal in the Olympic-type Asian Games. In the meantime, this delegation became the first male Burmese team to win a continental medal. Against all odds, the Burma team bettered their 1954 effort by winning the gold medal in the Asian Games, which was held at Bangkok in the mid-1960s. In that tournament, Burma beat Iran in the gold-medal game.

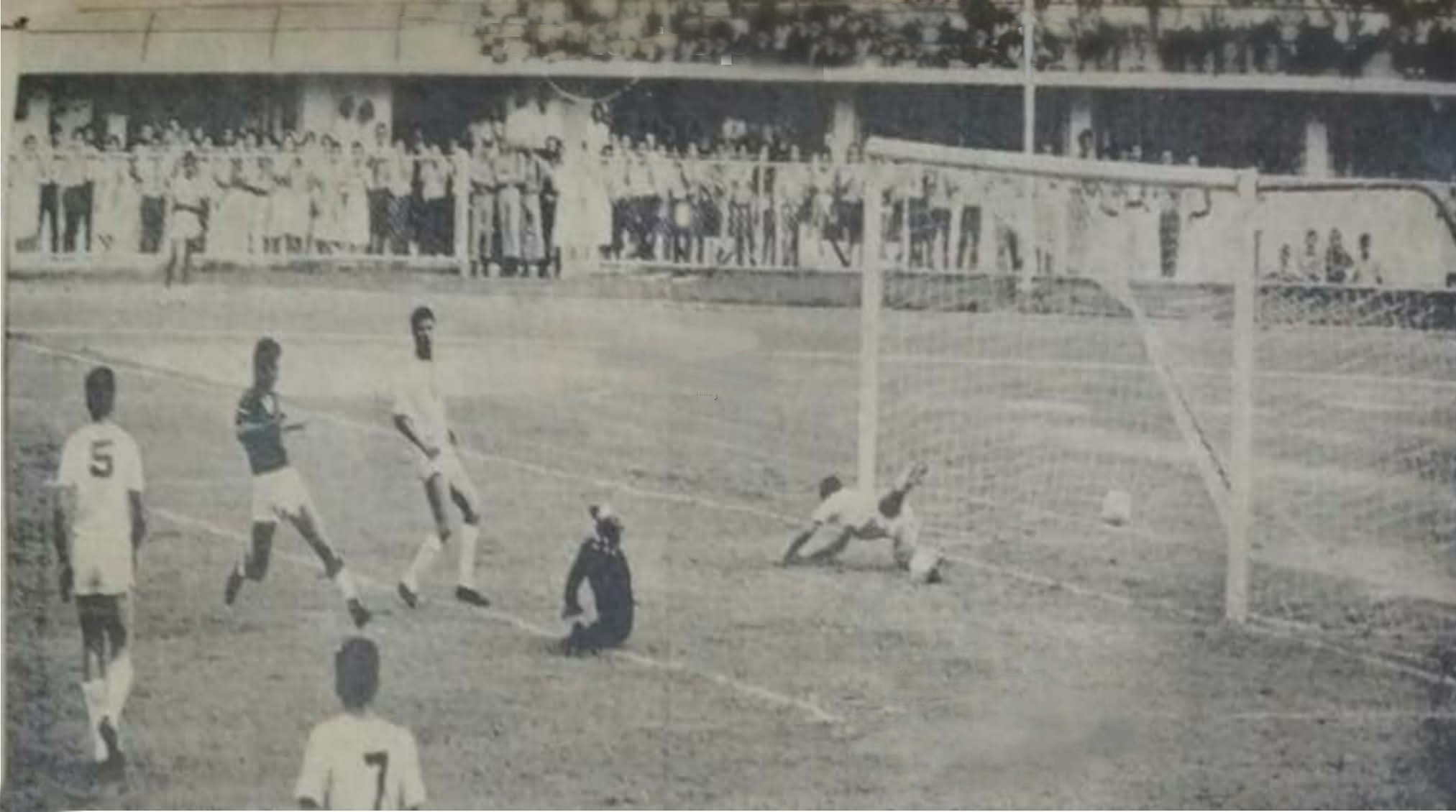
Aung Khin (in red) scoring the winning goal of the 1966 Asian Games final against Iran.

The 1966 Asian Games gold medal-winning squad established itself as one of the two best teams in the region as it finished as runner-up to Iran at the 1968 AFC Asian Cup after losing against Iran and drawing against Republic of China. Having won a silver medal in 1968.

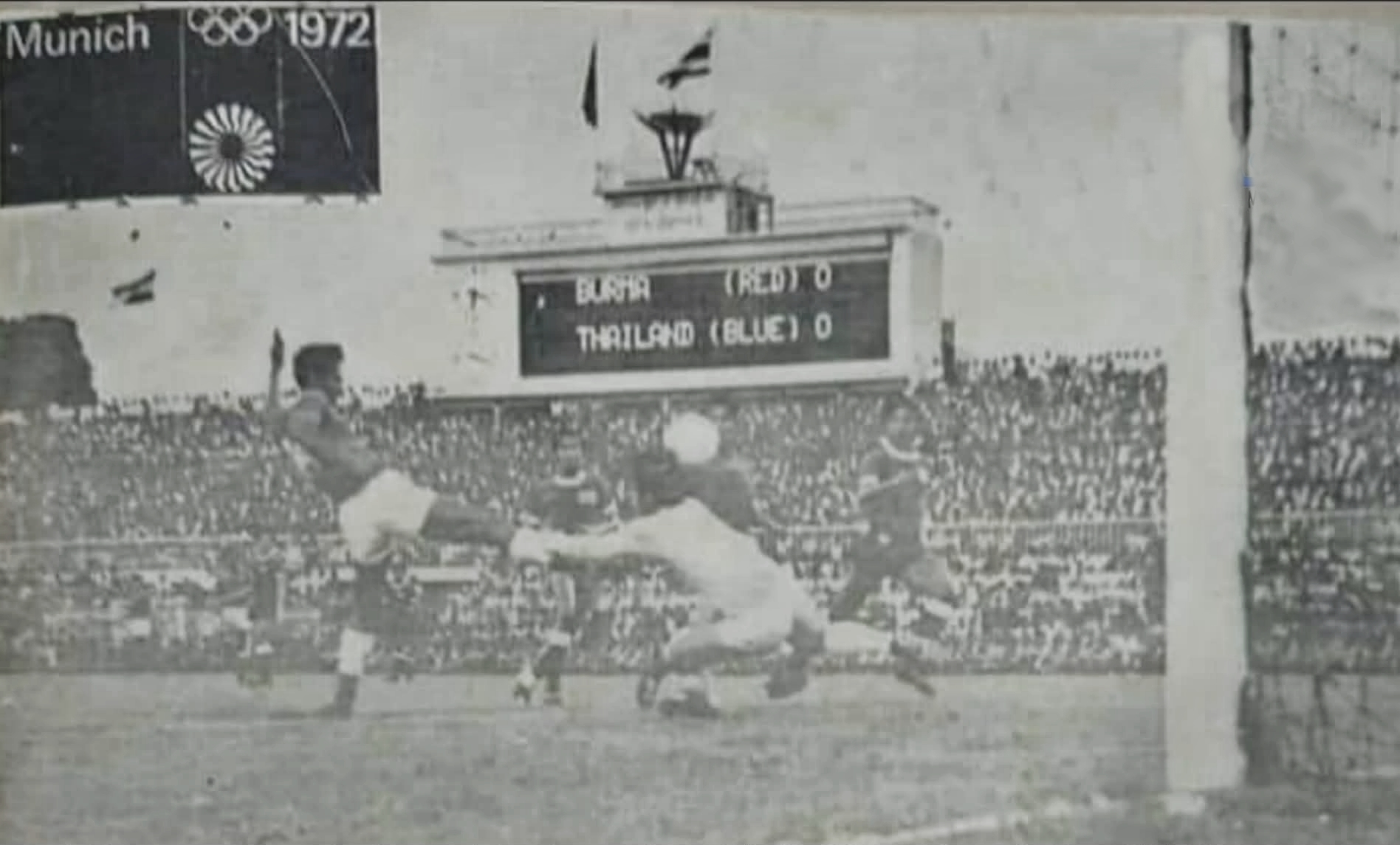
Striker Than Soe scoring the winning goal against Thailand in the 1972 Summer Olympics qualifiers in 1972.

The men's soccer team had a strong performance in the early 1970s as it qualified to compete in the 1972 Summer Olympics, which was held at Munich (West Germany), upon being one of the three finalists in the Asian tournament. Despite only winning against Sudan with 2–0, the Burmese players won the Fair Play Award. The following year, the nation earned its fifth consecutive Southeast Asian Games gold medal in Singapore (Kuala Lumpur 1965, Bangkok 1967, Rangoon 1969, and Kuala Lumpur 1971).

Three years before that, the national team wrote perhaps their most important chapter: they captured the continental title for the second time in a row, after the Burmese Olympic Committee sent footballers to Thailand for the 1970 Asian Games. Burma thus became the third football squad to win the Asian tournament twice. They were declared national heroes in Rangoon, the then capital of Burma, with their second consecutive gold medal in men's soccer.

During this era, Burma produced footballers such as Suk Bahadur who is a Burmese footballer known for his contributions to Burmese football.

Over the following years, mainly due to political problems within the country, the national side's ability to defend its Asian title slowly faded away.

=== Decline and struggle (1974–2010) ===
In the later years, Burma were unable to achieve similar results like in the golden era, due to many factors. The collapse of whole Burmese football system during the rule of Ne Win and later, the junta, had a negative impact on Burmese football team. Lack of funding and poor infrastructure prevented many Burmese players to play abroad, thus leading to retirement. At the same time, the rise of Malaysia, Indonesia, Vietnam and Thailand made Myanmar's golden era fade away.

Despite this, Myanmar did win 2 medals: a silver medal in the 1993 Southeast Asian Games, in a loss to Thailand, and a bronze in the 2004 AFF Championship.

=== Resurgence (2011–2019) ===
Myanmar's 2011 reforms had been a major point of turning Myanmar's football, which had declined since 1970s. During this era, a new wave of Burmese football had arrived with the change of Myanmar's political climate, after many years under junta's rule.

The arrival of the German manager Gerd Zeise has been the crucial turning point in Myanmar football. The Myanmar U20 team qualified to Myanmar's first ever FIFA tournament, the 2015 FIFA U20 World Cup after progressing to the semi-finals in the 2014 AFC U19 Championship as host. In the 2016 AFF Championship, Myanmar, once again as host, went to semi-finals, only losing to the eventual champions, Thailand.

Despite these successes, problems remain. Myanmar's football capability has been questioned after their disastrous 2018 FIFA World Cup qualification; while at the same time, many teams in Asia have developed after many years in the shadows. Once again, Myanmar failed to qualify for 2019 AFC Asian Cup, when they suffered a tremendous 1–5 loss to Kyrgyzstan. In an effort to prepare the team for the 2018 AFF Championship, on 13 October 2018, Myanmar played an unsuccessful friendly match against Bolivia at the Thuwunna Stadium, losing 3–0. Under Antoine Hey, Myanmar also had an unsuccessful 2018 AFF Championship, when the team was knocked out at the group stage, and Hey would resign after the tournament.

Myanmar began their 2022 FIFA World Cup qualification grouping with old rival Kyrgyzstan, as well as Tajikistan, Mongolia and especially powerhouse Japan. Under the guidance of the new manager Miodrag Radulović, Myanmar had a disastrous beginning when the team fell 0–1 to Mongolia away, 0–2 to Japan at home and especially a 0–7 away defeat to the Kyrgyz, causing the Montenegrin to be fired. After the defeat to Kyrgyzstan, old coach Antoine Hey returned, where he helped Myanmar to gain a shock home win 4–3 over Tajikistan before beating Mongolia 1–0 also at home to boost morale.

=== Descent (2020–2025) ===
The COVID-19 pandemic in Myanmar and subsequent 2021 Myanmar coup d'état greatly affected the national team, as several key players refused to represent Myanmar in international football due to the involvement of the junta. With a depleted squad, Myanmar suffered a record 10–0 defeat to Japan in the 2022 FIFA World Cup qualification, before further losses to Kyrgyzstan and Tajikistan eliminated the team from both the World Cup and automatic qualification for the 2023 AFC Asian Cup.

Myanmar failed to advance from the group stage of the 2020 AFF Championship, recording a victory over Timor-Leste but defeats to Singapore and Thailand, before drawing with the Philippines. The team also endured a disappointing 2023 AFC Asian Cup qualification campaign, losing all three matches against Singapore, Tajikistan and Kyrgyzstan.

At the 2022 AFF Championship, Myanmar again exited in the group stage after losing to Malaysia, Singapore and Vietnam, while drawing with Laos. Following the tournament, head coach Antoine Hey resigned on 31 January 2023.

In March 2023, Michael Feichtenbeiner was appointed head coach. Myanmar showed signs of improvement during the year, recording victories over Macau and Nepal, before defeating Macau 5–1 on aggregate in the first round of the 2026 FIFA World Cup qualification to advance to the second round.

Drawn alongside Japan, North Korea and Syria in the second round, Myanmar lost heavily to Japan and North Korea but earned a surprise 1–1 draw away to Syria before losing the return fixture 7–0. On 9 September 2024, the Myanmar Football Federation appointed former international Myo Hlaing Win as head coach.

At the 2024 ASEAN Championship, Myanmar defeated Laos, drew with the Philippines, and lost to Indonesia and Vietnam, finishing crashing out from the group stage.

Myanmar began the 2027 AFC Asian Cup qualification with consecutive home victories over Afghanistan and Pakistan. However, heavy defeats to Syria ultimately ended their hopes of qualifying for the 2027 AFC Asian Cup.

=== New optimism (2026–present) ===
Following a countless period of decline, the Myanmar Football Federation appointed Jørn Andersen as head coach on 4 July 2026. The former Norway international became the first European manager to take charge of the national team since 2013, with the objective of rebuilding the squad and restoring Myanmar's competitiveness in Southeast Asian football. Under Andersen, the team adopted a more structured and disciplined style of play while integrating a new generation of players. Myanmar recorded encouraging performances during the 2026 ASEAN Championship, including a 4–1 victory over Philippines and 7–2 thrashing win over Laos, signaling the beginning of a new chapter for the national team.

== Team image ==
=== Kits and crest ===
The Myanmar national team kit was made by FBT in a contract in effect from 2015 until 2018. On 6 November 2018, Warrix introduced a new Myanmar home and away kit. The home kit is a red shirt with red shorts and red socks. The away kit is a shirt, shorts and socks that is all white.

In November 2018, the Myanmar national team signed a six-year contract with Warrix Sports. The sports kit sponsorship contract was valued at US$5.67 million and it will run from 1 November 2018 to 31 December 2024.

In 2025, MFF formally ended its 6-year contract with the Thailand provider and announced a four-year partnership with Japanese brand Jogarbola, which is directly represented, sponsored and distributed by the Vietnamese firm Dong Luc Sport.

Myanmar national football team kits
Kit Provider	Period
(Germany) Adidas	2011–2013
(Italy) Lotto	2013–2015
(Thailand) FBT	2015–2018
(Thailand) Warrix	2018–2024
(Japan) Jogarbola	2025–

== Stadium ==
Myanmar plays most of its home matches in Thuwunna Stadium in Yangon, Myanmar. The stadium is larger and more up-to-date than the older Bogyoke Aung San Stadium. In 2013, the stadium was upgraded to a seating capacity of 50,000 spectators from the previous capacity of 32,000. It also hosted the 2016 AFF Championship Group B matches .

Myanmar national football team home stadiums
Image	Stadium	Capacity	Location	Last match
	Thuwunna Stadium	50,000	Yangon	v Laos (4 Agust 2026; 2026 ASEAN Championship)
	Mandalar Thiri Stadium	31,270	Mandalay	v Nepal (7 November 2019; Friendly)

== Results and fixtures ==
The following is a list of match results in the last 12 months, as well as any future matches that have been scheduled.

Win Draw Loss Fixture

=== 2026 ===
26 March 2027 AFC Asian Cup qualification	Afghanistan	1–2	Myanmar	Yangon, Myanmar (Note: Afghanistan were unable to play their home matches at home due to the ongoing Afghan conflict.)
17:00 UTC+6:30	Popalzay 10'	Report; Report (AFC)	Than Paing 45'; Khun Kyaw Zin Hein 73'	Stadium: Thuwunna Stadium; Attendance: 1,760; Referee: Ngô Duy Lân (Vietnam)

31 March 2027 AFC Asian Cup qualification	Pakistan	1–2	Myanmar	Islamabad, Pakistan
18:30 UTC+3	Shayak Dost 90'	Report; Report (AFC)	Saqib Hanif 46' (o.g.); Than Paing 59'	Stadium: Jinnah Sports Stadium; Referee: Firdavs Norsafarov (Uzbekistan)

6 June Friendly	Guam	1–6	Myanmar	Manila, Philippines
19:30 UTC+8	J. Gomez 90+1' (pen.)		Soe Moe Kyaw 13'; Maung Maung Lwin 23'; Win Naing Tun 35', 53'; Zaw Win Thein 57'; Shine Wanna Aung 86'	Stadium: Rizal Memorial Stadium; Referee: Nawal Zubir (Malaysia)

9 June Friendly	Philippines	5–1	Myanmar	Manila, Philippines
19:30 UTC+8	J. Tabinas 45+1'; P. Tabinas 54'; Rasmussen 80', 90+1'; Leipold 88'		Win Naing Tun 82'	Stadium: Rizal Memorial Stadium; Attendance: 4,662; Referee: Songkran Bunmeekiart (Thailand)

18 July Friendly	Vietnam	4–0	Myanmar	Thái Nguyên, Vietnam
19:00 UTC+7	Nguyễn Xuân Son 5'; Phạm Xuân Mạnh 39'; Đỗ Hoàng Hên 59'; Nguyễn Đình Bắc 90+1' (pen.)			Stadium: Thái Nguyên Stadium; Referee: Torphong Somsing (Thailand)

25 July 2026 ASEAN Championship Group B	Myanmar	1–2	Malaysia	Yangon, Myanmar
16:30 UTC+6:30	Myat Kaung Khant 9'	Report	Josué 52', 57' (pen.)	Stadium: Thuwunna Stadium; Referee: Yusuke Ohashi (Japan)

28 July 2026 ASEAN Championship Group B	Philippines	1–4	Myanmar	Capas, Philippines
18:00 UTC+8	Gayoso 68'	Report	Kyaw Min Oo 45+1'; Than Paing 28', 83'; Win Naing Tun 81'	Stadium: New Clark City Athletics Stadium

4 August 2026 ASEAN Championship Group B	Myanmar	7–2	Laos	Yangon, Myanmar
16:30 UTC+6:30	Lwin Moe Aung 2'; Win Naing Tun 20', 41', 83'; Maung Maung Lwin 45+6'(P); Than Paing 52'; Hein Htet Aung 81'		Bounchay Chernvanglien 17' Sangvilay Phoutthavong 23'	Stadium: Thuwunna Stadium

8 August 2026 ASEAN Championship Group B	Thailand	2–0	Myanmar	Bangkok, Thailand
20:00 UTC+7	Worachit 11' (pen.); Jehhanafee 52' (pen.)	Report		Stadium: Rajamangala Stadium; Attendance: 13,026; Referee: Yusuke Ohashi (Japan)

24 September 2026 FIFA ASEAN Challenge Cup Group B	Myanmar	2–0	Timor-Leste	Kowloon, Hong Kong
20:00 UTC+8	Win Naing Tun 19'; Than Paing 75'	FIFA Report		Stadium: Mong Kok Stadium; Referee: Zayniddin Alimov (Kyrgyzstan)

27 September 2026 FIFA ASEAN Challenge Cup Group B	Cambodia	1–0	Myanmar	Kowloon, Hong Kong
18:00 UTC+8	Kakada 90+4'	FIFA Report		Stadium: Kai Tak Stadium; Referee: Wong Wai Lun (Hong Kong)

Myanmar vs Turkmenistan

== Coaching staff ==
Source
Position	Name
Head coach	(Norway) Jørn Andersen
Assistant Coach	(Scotland) Richard Horlock (Myanmar) Aung Kyaw Moe (Myanmar) Min Thu
Goalkeeping Coach	(Germany) Mike Kost
Video Analyst	(Japan) Jun Hirabayashi
Team Doctor	(Myanmar) Kyaw Thant Zin
Media Officer	(Myanmar) Zaw Min Htike
Videographer	(Myanmar) Saw Ye Mon
Scouting	(Myanmar) Kyi Lwin
Physiotherapist	(Myanmar) Thura Toe
Equipment Manager	(Myanmar) Aung Kyaw Lin

=== Coaching history ===
Name	Period	Matches	Wins	Draws	Losses	Win %	Honours
(Scotland) Alex Weir	1954						1954 Asian Games (Bronze)
(Socialist Federal Republic of Yugoslavia) Milorad Mitrović	1955–1959						
(Socialist Federal Republic of Yugoslavia) Marko Valok	1959–1961						
(Soviet Union) Mikhail Bozenenkov	1961–1963						1961 SEAP Games (Silver)
(Myanmar) Sein Hlaing	1964–1965						Merdeka Cup Champions (1964)
(Soviet Union) German Zonin	1965–1967						Asian Games Champions (1966); Southeast Asian Games Champions (1965, 1967); Merdeka Cup Champions (1967)
(Myanmar) Sein Hlaing	1968–1979						Asian Games Champions (1970); Southeast Asian Games Champions (1969, 1971, 1973); Merdeka Cup Champions (1971)
(West Germany) Bert Trautmann	1972–1974						1972 President's Cup Football Tournament Champions
(Netherlands) Ger Blok	1993–1996						
(Serbia and Montenegro) Ratomir Dujković	1996–1997						
(England) David Booth	2000–2003						
(Bulgaria) Ivan Venkov Kolev	Nov 2004 – 2005						2004 Tiger Cup Semi-finalists
(Myanmar) Sann Win	2006–2007						2006 Merdeka Tournament Champions; 2007 Merdeka Tournament Runners-up
(Brazil) Marcos Falopa	Apr 2007 – Dec 2008						
(Myanmar) Tim Myint Aung	Apr – Oct 2009						
(Croatia) Drago Mamić	Oct 2009 – Feb 2010						
(Myanmar) Tin Myint Aung	Feb – Dec 2010	5	2	0	3	40.00	
(Serbia) Milan Živadinović	Jan – Jul 2011	7	0	2	5	0.00	
(Myanmar) Sann Win*	Jul 2011	5	1	1	3	20.00	
(South Korea) Park Sung-Hwa	Dec 2011 – Dec 2013	13	5	4	4	38.46	
(Myanmar) Sann Win*	Sep 2013	1	0	1	0	0.00	
(Serbia) Radojko Avramovic	Feb 2014 – Oct 2015	22	7	4	11	31.82	2014 Philippine Peace Cup Champions
(Myanmar) Tin Myint Aung*	Aug 2017	1	1	0	0	100.00	
(Germany) Gerd Zeise	Oct 2015 – March 2018	24	7	6	11	29.17	2016 AFF Championship Semi-final
(Myanmar) Zaw Win Tun*	March 2018	1	1	0	0	100.00	
(Germany) Antoine Hey	16 May – 13 December 2018	8	2	1	5	25.00	
(Myanmar) Myo Min Tun*	March 2019	2	0	1	1	0.00	
(Montenegro) Miodrag Radulović	20 April – 20 October 2019	5	1	0	4	20.00	
(Germany) Antoine Hey	21 October 2019 – 31 January 2023	21	3	2	16	14.29	
(Germany) Michael Feichtenbeiner	1 March 2023 – 13 August 2024	11	3	4	4	27.27	2023 Tri-Nation Series (India) Runners-up
(Myanmar) Myo Hlaing Win	10 September 2024 – 7 July 2026	16	7	2	7	43.75	
(Norway) Jørn Andersen	8 July 2026 -	7	3	0	4	42.86	

* As caretaker

== Players ==
=== Current squad ===
The following 25 players were called up for the 2026 FIFA ASEAN Challenge Cup.

Caps and goals updated as of 25 September 2026, after the game against Cambodia.

No.	Pos.	Player	Date of birth (age)	Caps	Goals	Club
1	GK	Sann Satt Naing	4 November 1997 (age 29)	21	0	(Myanmar Football Federation) Yangon United
18	GK	Nay Lin Htet	23 April 2002 (age 24)	1	0	(Myanmar Football Federation) Hantharwaddy United
23	GK	Zin Nyi Nyi Aung	6 June 2000 (age 26)	12	0	(Myanmar Football Federation) Yangon United
2	DF	Phyo Pyae Sone	24 October 1999 (age 27)	3	0	(Myanmar Football Federation) Shan United
3	DF	Hein Zeyar Lin	12 August 2000 (age 26)	49	0	(Myanmar Football Federation) Yangon United
4	DF	Soe Moe Kyaw	23 March 1999 (age 27)	63	4	(Football Association of Thailand) Uthai Thani
5	DF	Myat Phone Khant	12 October 2006 (age 20)	6	0	(Myanmar Football Federation) Thitsar Arman
15	DF	Zwe Khant Min	20 June 2000 (age 26)	21	0	(Myanmar Football Federation) Yangon City
6	MF	Kyaw Min Oo	16 June 1996 (age 30)	49	2	(Myanmar Football Federation) Shan United
7	MF	Lwin Moe Aung	10 December 1999 (age 26)	62	6	(Myanmar Football Federation) Shan United
8	MF	Wai Lin Aung	30 July 1999 (age 27)	46	1	(Football Association of Malaysia) Negeri Sembilan
11	MF	Kaung Khant Kyaw	26 February 2007 (age 19)	2	0	(Myanmar Football Federation) Yangon United
12	MF	Moe Swe	31 May 2003 (age 23)	0	0	(Myanmar Football Federation) Yadanarbon
13	MF	Khun Kyaw Zin Hein	15 July 2002 (age 24)	15	1	(Myanmar Football Federation) Yangon City
14	MF	Aung Myo Khant	6 May 2001 (age 25)	7	0	(Myanmar Football Federation) Yangon United
16	MF	Shine Wanna Aung	15 March 2006 (age 20)	5	1	(Myanmar Football Federation) Thitsar Arman
20	MF	Myat Kaung Khant	15 July 2000 (age 26)	37	2	(Myanmar Football Federation) Yangon City
21	MF	Ye Yint Aung	22 March 2000 (age 26)	24	1	(Myanmar Football Federation) Shan United
22	MF	Zaw Win Thein	1 March 2003 (age 23)	25	1	(Myanmar Football Federation) Yangon United
9	FW	Than Paing	6 December 1996 (age 29)	65	10	(Myanmar Football Federation) Yangon United
10	FW	Win Naing Tun	3 May 2000 (age 26)	52	13	(Myanmar Football Federation) Yangon City
17	FW	Pyae Sone Aung	12 August 1995 (age 31)	0	0	(Myanmar Football Federation) Thitsar Arman
19	FW	Hein Htet Aung	5 October 2001 (age 25)	46	1	(Football Association of Malaysia) Melaka

=== Recent call-ups ===
The following players have also been called up to the Myanmar squad within the last twelve months.

Pos.	Player	Date of birth (age)	Caps	Goals	Club	Latest call-up
GK	Khant Min Thant	24 June 2004 (age 22)	0	0	(Myanmar) Yadanarbon	v. Philippines, 9 June 2026
DF	Hein Phyo Win	19 September 1998 (age 28)	52	0	(Thailand) Nakhon Ratchasima	
DF	Thiha Htet Aung	13 March 1996 (age 30)	19	0	(Myanmar) Yadanarbon	v. Philippines, 9 June 2026
DF	Aung Wunna Soe	19 April 2000 (age 26)	9	0	(Myanmar) Shan United	v. Philippines, 9 June 2026
DF	Thu Rein Soe	4 September 1998 (age 28)	0	0	(Myanmar) Yangon United	v. Pakistan, 31 March 2026
FW	Soe Min Oo	8 March 1988 (age 38)	15	3	(Myanmar) Yadanarbon	v. Philippines, 9 June 2026
FW	Pyae Moe	15 October 1993 (age 33)	1	0	(Myanmar) Yangon United	v. Pakistan, 31 March 2026
MF	Kaung Myat Nyein	10 February 2004 (age 22)	0	0	(Myanmar) ISPE	
FW	Than Toe Aung	13 July 2003 (age 23)	1	0	(Myanmar) Hantharwaddy	v. Afghanistan, 26 March 2026^{PRE}
FW	Maung Maung Lwin	18 June 1995 (age 31)	96	16	(Thailand) Lamphun Warriors	
FW	Min Maw Oo	6 March 2005 (age 21)	10	0	(Myanmar) Thitsar Arman	
FW	Sa Aung Pyae Ko	1 December 1998 (age 27)	0	0	(Myanmar) Shan United	v. Afghanistan, 26 March 2026^{PRE}
FW	Saw Myo Zaw		2	0	(Myanmar) Thitsar Arman	
^{INJ} Withdrew due to injury^{PRE} Preliminary squad^{RET} Retired from the national team^{SUS} Serving suspension^{WD} Player withdrew from the squad due to non-injury issue.

== Player records ==
As of 28 July 2026
Players in bold are still active with Myanmar.

=== Most appearances ===
Rank	Player	Caps	Goals	Career
1	**Maung Maung Lwin**	96	16	2015–present
2	David Htan	77	4	2011–2024
3	Zaw Min Tun	75	5	2011–2022
3	**Nanda Kyaw**	75	1	2015–present
5	Myo Hlaing Win	68	45	1989–2005
6	Khin Maung Lwin	67	4	2006–2017
6	Yan Paing	67	13	2002–2014
8	Yan Aung Kyaw	64	0	2011–2019
9	**Than Paing**	62	9	2014–present
10	**Lwin Moe Aung**	60	6	2018–present
10	**Soe Moe Kyaw**	60	4	2018–present

=== Top goalscorers ===
Rank	Player	Goals	Caps	Ratio	Career
1	Myo Hlaing Win	45	68	0.66	1989–2005
2	Win Maung	37	—	—	1962–1980
2	Ye Nyunt	37	—	—	1968–1975
4	Than Soe	24	—	—	1970–1975
5	Soe Myat Min	21	56	0.38	1998–2008
6	Kyaw Ko Ko	16	54	0.3	2010–2025
6	Suk Bahadur	16	—	—	1952–1970
6	**Maung Maung Lwin**	16	96	0.17	2015–
9	Than Toe Aung	14	21	0.67	1987–2000
10	**Win Naing Tun**	12	49	0.24	2021–
11	Yan Paing	11	67	0.16	2002–2014

NB Goalscorers of several matches from the 1950s till 1980s (see Myanmar national football team results) are not yet known and yet to be researched.

== Competitive record ==
=== FIFA World Cup ===
FIFA World Cup record								Qualification record					
Year	Round	Pld	W	D	L	GF	GA	Pld	W	D	L	GF	GA
1930 to 1938	Part of United Kingdom							Part of United Kingdom					
as Burma
(Brazil) 1950	Withdrew							Withdrew from qualification					
1954 to 1986	Did not enter							Did not enter					
as / Myanmar
(Italy) 1990	Did not enter							Did not enter					
(United States) 1994	Withdrew							Withdrew from qualification					
(France) 1998	Did not enter							Did not enter					
(South Korea) (Japan) 2002	Withdrew							Withdrew from qualification					
(Germany) 2006	Banned							Banned					
(South Africa) 2010	Did not qualify							2	0	0	2	0	11
(Brazil) 2014	Did not qualify							4	1	0	3	2	6
(Russia) 2018	Did not qualify							8	2	2	4	9	21
(Qatar) 2022	Did not qualify							8	2	0	6	6	35
(Canada) (Mexico) (United States) 2026	Did not qualify							8	1	2	5	8	29
(Morocco) (Portugal) (Spain) 2030	To be determined							To be determined					
(Saudi Arabia) 2034	To be determined							To be determined					
Total	0/19	–	–	–	–	–	–	30	6	4	20	25	102

- Banned in 2006 for withdrawing from qualification in 2002.
- Initially banned from 2018 for crowd trouble during a 2014 World Cup qualifying match against Oman but later overturned to matches to be played on neutral soil.

=== Olympic Games ===
Olympic Games record
Year	Result	Position	Pld	W	D	L	GF	GA	Squad
(France) 1900 to (Finland) 1952	Did not participate								
(Australia) 1956 to (Mexico) 1968	Did not qualify								
(West Germany) 1972	Round 1	9/16	3	1	0	2	2	2	Squad
(Canada) 1976 to (South Korea) 1988	Did not qualify								
(Spain) 1992 to present	See Myanmar national under-23 team								
Total	Round 1	–	3	1	0	2	2	2	—

=== AFC Asian Cup ===
AFC Asian Cup record									Qualification record				
Year	Round	Pld	W	D	L	GF	GA	Pld	W	D	L	GF	GA
(Hong Kong) 1956	Withdrew							Withdrew					
(South Korea) 1960	Withdrew							Withdrew					
(Israel) 1964	Withdrew							Withdrew					
(Iran) 1968	Runners-up	4	2	1	1	5	4	3	3	0	0	5	0
(Thailand) 1972	Withdrew							Withdrew					
(Iran) 1976	Withdrew							Withdrew					
(Kuwait) 1980	Withdrew							Withdrew					
(Singapore) 1984	Withdrew							Withdrew					
(Qatar) 1988	Withdrew							Withdrew					
(Japan) 1992	Did not enter							Did not enter					
(United Arab Emirates) 1996	Did not qualify							6	2	1	3	11	20
(Lebanon) 2000	Did not qualify							3	2	0	1	6	4
(China) 2004	Did not qualify							8	3	0	5	11	18
(Indonesia) (Malaysia) (Thailand) (Vietnam) 2007	Did not enter							Banned					
(Qatar) 2011	Did not enter							AFC Challenge Cup					
(Australia) 2015	Did not enter							AFC Challenge Cup					
(United Arab Emirates) 2019	Did not qualify							14	4	4	6	19	31
(Qatar) 2023	Did not qualify							11	2	0	9	8	47
(Saudi Arabia) 2027	Did not qualify							8	1	2	5	8	29
Total	Runners-up	4	2	1	1	5	4	53	17	7	29	68	149

=== Asian Games ===
Asian Games record
Year	Round	Pld	W	D	L	GF	GA
(India) 1951	Quarter-finals	1	0	0	1	0	2
(Philippines) 1954	Third place	4	2	0	1	10	8
(Japan) 1958	Group stage	2	0	0	2	3	6
(Indonesia) 1962	Withdrew						
(Thailand) 1966	Champions	6	4	2	0	8	3
(Thailand) 1970	Champions	7	4	2	1	9	5
(Iran) 1974	Second round	6	2	1	3	14	14
(Thailand) 1978	Group stage	2	0	0	2	1	5
(India) 1982	Group stage	3	1	0	2	3	8
(South Korea) 1986	did not qualify						
(China) 1990	did not qualify						
(Japan) 1994	Group stage	3	0	1	2	2	9
(Thailand) 1998	Withdrew						
2002–present	See Myanmar under-23 football team						
Total	Champions	34	13	6	14	49	60

=== AFC Challenge Cup ===
AFC Challenge Cup record								Qualification record					
Year	Round	Pld	W	D	L	GF	GA	Pld	W	D	L	GF	GA
(Bangladesh) 2006	Banned							Banned					
(India) 2008	Fourth place	5	2	0	3	6	6						
(Sri Lanka) 2010	Fourth place	5	2	0	3	6	10	3	3	0	0	7	1
(Nepal) 2012	Did not qualify							3	0	1	2	2	6
(Maldives) 2014	Group stage	3	1	0	2	3	5	3	2	1	0	7	1
Total	Best: Fourth place	13	5	0	8	15	21	9	5	2	2	16	8

=== ASEAN Championship ===
ASEAN Championship record										Qualification record					
Year	Round	Pos	Pld	W	D	L	GF	GA	Squad	Pld	W	D	L	GF	GA
(Singapore) 1996	Group stage	6th	4	2	0	2	11	12	Squad	No qualification					
(Vietnam) 1998	Group stage	5th	3	1	1	1	8	9	Squad	2	2	0	0	7	1
(Thailand) 2000	Group stage	6th	3	1	0	2	4	8	Squad	No qualification					
(Indonesia) (Singapore) 2002	Group stage	5th	4	2	1	1	13	5	Squad	No qualification					
(Malaysia) (Vietnam) 2004	Fourth place	4th	7	3	1	3	12	12	Squad	No qualification					
(Singapore) (Thailand) 2007	Group stage	6th	3	0	3	0	1	1	Squad	Qualified automatically					
(Indonesia) (Thailand) 2008	Group stage	6th	3	1	0	2	4	8	Squad	Qualified automatically					
(Indonesia) (Vietnam) 2010	Group stage	7th	3	0	1	2	2	9	Squad	Qualified automatically					
(Malaysia) (Thailand) 2012	Group stage	8th	3	0	1	2	1	7	Squad	4	3	1	0	6	1
(Singapore) (Vietnam) 2014	Group stage	7th	3	0	1	2	2	6	Squad	4	3	1	0	6	2
(Myanmar) (Philippines) 2016	Semi-finals	4th	4	2	0	2	5	9	Squad	Qualified automatically					
(ASEAN) 2018	Group stage	5th	4	2	1	1	7	5	Squad	Qualified automatically					
(Singapore) 2020	Group stage	8th	4	1	0	3	4	10	Squad	Qualified automatically					
(ASEAN) 2022	Group stage	8th	4	0	1	3	4	9	Squad	Qualified automatically					
(ASEAN) 2024	Group stage	8th	4	1	1	2	4	9	Squad	Qualified automatically					
(ASEAN) 2026	Group stage	6th	4	2	0	2	12	7	Squad						
Total	Fourth place	16/16	60	18	12	30	94	126	—	10	8	2	0	19	4

=== Southeast Asian Games ===
Southeast Asian Games record
Year	Round	Pld	W	D	L	GF	GA
(Thailand) 1959	Group stage	3	0	0	3	3	10
(Myanmar) 1961	Runners-up	4	2	0	2	7	5
(Cambodia) 1963	Cancelled						
(Malaysia) 1965	Champions	3	2	1	0	5	2
(Thailand) 1967	Champions	4	4	0	0	7	2
(Myanmar) 1969	Champions	3	3	0	0	8	1
(Malaysia) 1971	Champions	4	3	1	0	13	3
(Singapore) 1973	Champions	4	4	0	0	15	4
(Thailand) 1975	Third place	3	1	1	1	3	3
(Malaysia) 1977	Third place	4	3	0	1	12	9
(Indonesia) 1979	Group stage	4	0	1	3	2	5
(Philippines) 1981	Group stage	2	0	1	1	3	4
(Singapore) 1983	Group stage	3	1	0	2	3	4
(Thailand) 1985	Withdrew						
(Indonesia) 1987	Fourth place	4	0	2	2	3	14
(Malaysia) 1989	Group stage	2	0	0	2	0	7
(Philippines) 1991	Group stage	2	0	0	2	1	6
(Singapore) 1993	Runners-up	6	4	0	2	21	11
(Thailand) 1995	Fourth place	6	3	0	3	10	8
(Indonesia) 1997	Group stage	4	1	1	2	10	8
(Brunei) 1999	Group stage	4	1	1	2	4	10
2001–present	See Myanmar national under-23 team						
Total	5 tiles	64	32	9	28	130	126

=== FIFA ASEAN Challenge Cup ===
FIFA ASEAN Challenge Cup record
Year	Result	Position	Pld	W	D	L	GF	GA	Squad
(Hong Kong) 2026	Group stage	3rd	2	1	0	1	2	1	

=== Regional record ===
Last meet up against Southeast Asia countries
Opponents	Score	Year	Outcome	Match type
Brunei	16 October 2014	3−1	Won	2014 AFF Championship
Cambodia	27 September 2026	0−1	Lost	2026 FIFA ASEAN Cup
Laos	4 August 2026	7−2	Won	2026 ASEAN Championship
Indonesia	9 December 2024	0−1	Lost	2024 ASEAN Championship
Malaysia	25 July 2026	1−2	Lost	2026 ASEAN Championship
Philippines	28 July 2026	4−1	Win	2026 ASEAN Championship
Singapore	14 November 2024	2−3	Lost	Friendly
Thailand	8 August 2026	0−2	Lost	2026 ASEAN Championship
Timor-Leste	24 September 2026	2−0	Won	2026 FIFA ASEAN Cup
Vietnam	18 July 2026	0−4	Lost	Friendly

== Honours ==
=== Continental ===
- AFC Asian Cup
  - (silver) Runners-up (1): 1968
- Asian Games (Note: Competition organized by OCA, officially not recognized by FIFA.)
  - (gold) Gold medal (2): 1966, 1970 (Note: shared title)
  - (bronze) Bronze medal (1): 1954

=== Regional ===
- Southeast Asian Games
  - (gold) Gold medal (5): 1965, 1967, 1969, 1971, 1973
  - (silver) Silver medal (3): 1961, 1993, 2015
  - (bronze) Bronze medal (4): 1975, 1977, 2011, 2019

=== Friendly ===
- Merdeka Tournament (4): 1964, 1967, 1971, 2006
- Jakarta Anniversary Tournament (4): 1971, 1973, 1974, 1975
- Marah Halim Cup (2): 1978, 1979
- Korea Cup (3): 1971, 1972, 1973
- Myanmar Grand Royal Challenge Cup (2): 2006, 2008
- Philippine Peace Cup (1): 2014

=== Summary ===
Only official honours are included, according to FIFA statutes (competitions organized/recognized by FIFA or an affiliated confederation).

Competition	1st place, gold medalist(s)	2nd place, silver medalist(s)	3rd place, bronze medalist(s)	Total
AFC Asian Cup	0	1	0	1
Total	0	1	0	1

== See also ==
- Myanmar national football team results 1950 to 2026
- Myanmar national under-22 football team 2001 to 2026
- Myanmar national under-19 football team 1959 to 2026
- Myanmar national under-19 football team 1959 to 2026
- Myanmar national under-17 football team
- Myanmar women's national football team

== Notes ==
Preceded by 1962 India	Asian Games Champions; 1966 (first title); 1970 (second title)	Succeeded by 1974 Iran
