= Sant'Ireneo a Centocelle =

- St. Irenaeus at Centocelle (in English); S. Irenæ ad Centumcellas (in Latin)
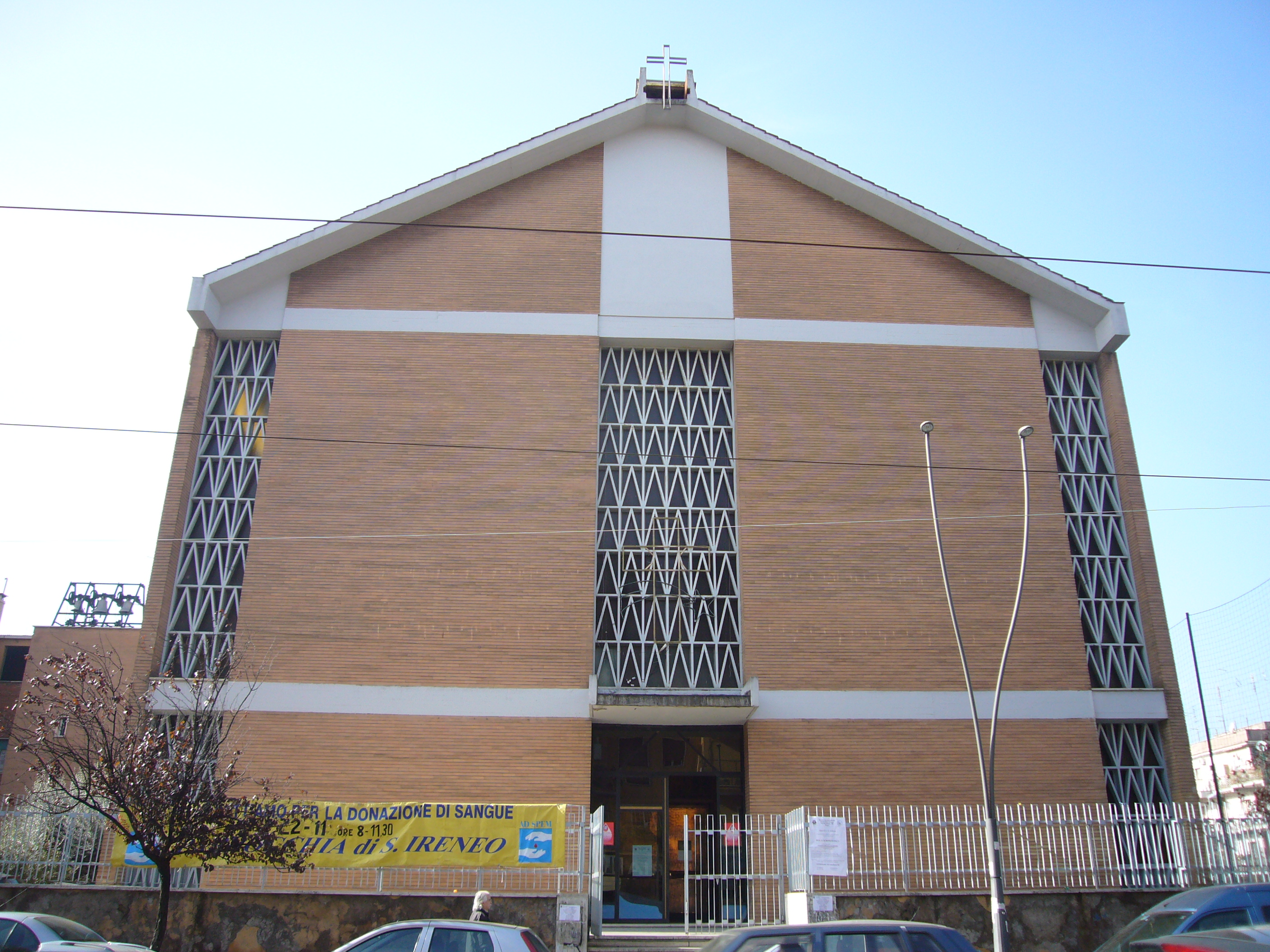
- Facade
- Click on the map for a fullscreen view
- 41°53′23″N 12°33′52″E
- Location: Via dei Castani 291, Rome
- Country: Italy
- Denomination: Roman Catholic
- Tradition: Roman Rite
- Website: santireneo.org

History
- Status: Titular church
- Dedication: Irenaeus

Architecture
- Architectural type: Church
- Style: Modernist

Administration
- District: Lazio
- Province: Rome

The church of Sant'Ireneo a Centocelle is a church in Rome, in the Prenestino district, in Via dei Castani.

== History ==
Built in the twentieth century and designed by Antonio Guidi, the church is the home of the parish, established July 17, 1954 by decree of the Cardinal Vicar Clemente Micara "Here celeritate".

Since February 14, 2015, is the seat of the cardinal title of S. Irenæ ad Cetumcellas.

== List of Cardinal Protectors ==
- Charles Maung Bo 14 February 2015 - present
