= Stauropolis (diocese) =

Diocese of Stauropolis Dioecesis Stauropolitana (Latin) Επισκοπή Σταυρούπολις (Greek)
- AD 4th century–AD 15th century
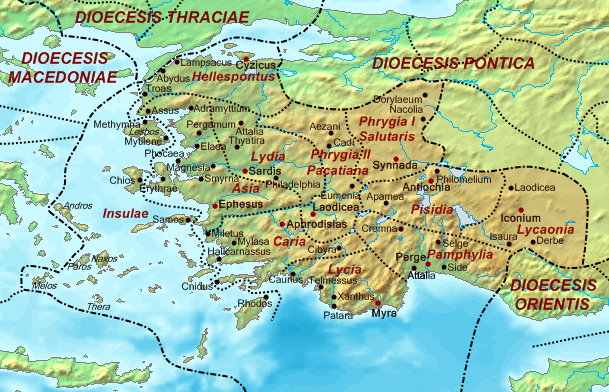
- Map of the Diocese of Asia, c. AD 4th century
- Capital: Stauropolis
- Government
  - Type: Titular see
- Historical era: Byzantine
  - Established: AD 4th century
  - Disestablished: AD 15th century
- Today part of: Turkey

Stauropolis (Greek: Σταυρούπολις) is the former metropolitan see of Caria in Asia Minor within the Patriarchate of Constantinople. It remains a titular see of the Roman Catholic Church.

== History ==
The bishopric was centered on the ancient town of Stauropolis (Aphrodisias), on the site of modern Geyre, Turkey. It was the metropolitan seat of the Roman province of Caria in the civil Diocese of Asia and the Patriarchate of Constantinople.

In the Hellenistic-Roman era, the city was called Aphrodisias. In the Christian era, it was renamed Stauropolis (Ancient Greek: Σταυρούπολις) 'city of the cross'. In later Byzantine times, it assumed the name of Caria, a name preserved by the village of Geyre.

Stauropolis was home to an ancient Christian community. The Roman Martyrology on May 3 remembers the martyrs Diodorus and Rodopiano, who were condemned to be stoned to Aphrodisias during the Diocletianic Persecution.

At the Council of Chalcedon (451) bishops signed the documents of confession as Aphrodisiadis Metropolitan Cariae. There are about thirty known bishops of Stauropoli in the first Christian millennium, many of them thanks to epigraphic and sigillografiche discoveries.

In the Notitia Episcopatuum composed during the reign of Emperor Heraclius I (about 640), the seat of Stauropolis is listed at the 20th place in the hierarchical order of metropolitanates under the patriarchate of Constantinople and are attributed 28 dioceses suffragan. In the Notitia attributed to Emperor Leo VI (early tenth century) Stauropolis fell to 21st place among the metropolitanates of the Patriarchate, and the suffragan dioceses have become 26.

Surviving acta record that between 1356-1361 and 1365-1368 it was without a metropolitan, but was under the administration of the metropolitan of Bizye. In 1369 the metropolitan reappears as the recipient of the churches of Miletus and Antioch on the Maeander, and another is mentioned in 1399. In 1387 and in 1393, Stauropolis was temporarily given the metropolis of Rhodes with Kos and the Cyclades, so that it could cover its own expenses.

=== Residential bishops ===
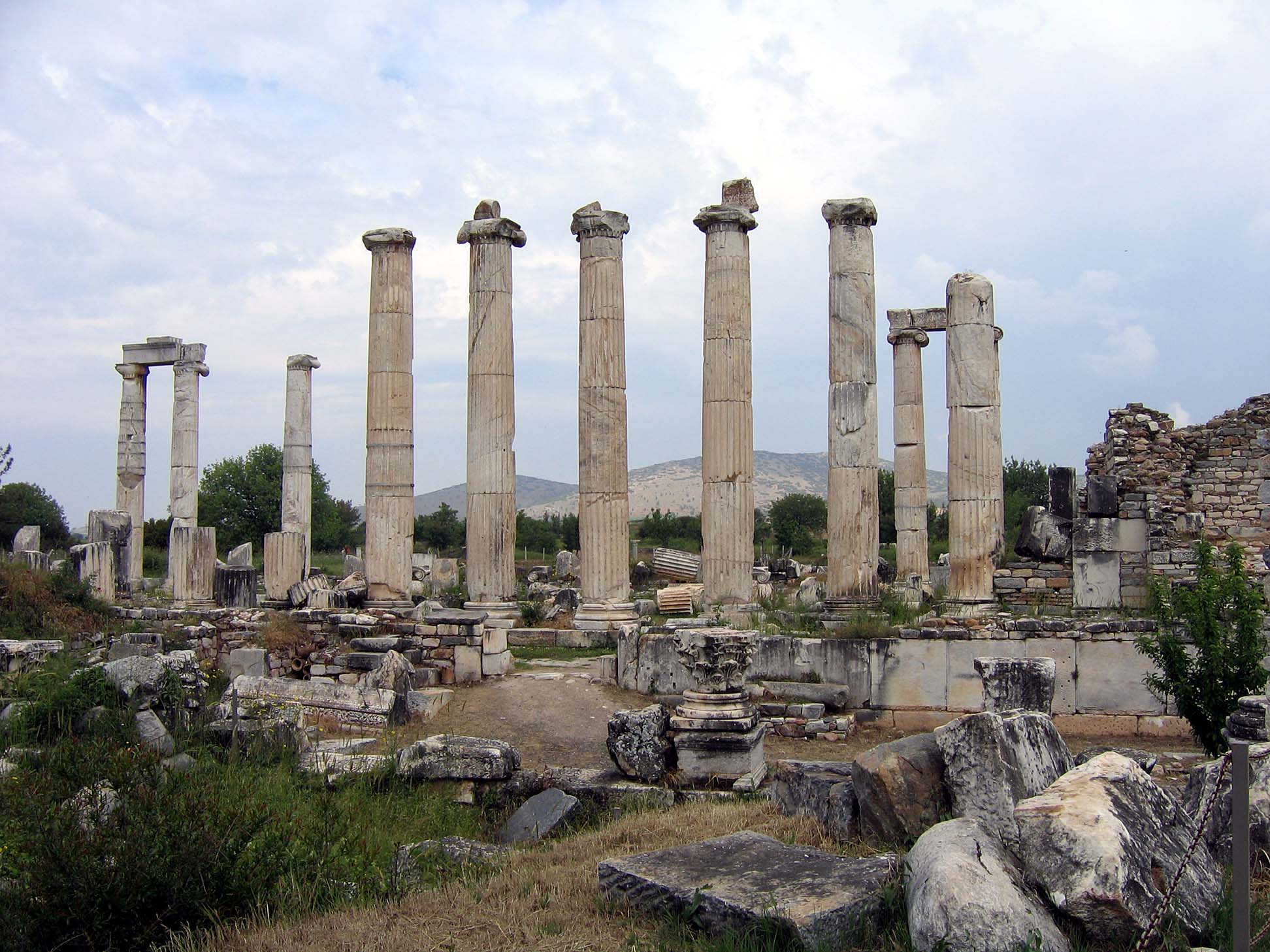
Ruins at Stauropolis

- Ammon (mentioned at the First Council of Nicæa in 325)
- Eumenius (Eudocius) (mentioned at the First Council of Constantinople in 381)
- Cyrus (at the First Council of Ephesus in 431 – after 449)
- Critonianus (mentioned at the Council of Chalcedon in 451)
- Nonnus (mentioned in about 488)
- Euphemius (? – 518 exiled) (monophysite bishop)
- Severianus (mentioned at the Second Council of Constantinople in 553)
- Paul (558-576 deposed) (monophysite bishop)
- Deuterius (about 577 – about 582)
- Theopropius (5th–7th century)
- Ortagoras (5-7th century)
- Theodore I (mentioned in 680)
- Sisinnius (mentioned in 692)
- Eustacus (before 730 or between 787 and 815)
- Anonymous (mentioned in 787)
- Michael (8th century)
- Nicephorus I (first half of 9th century)
- Theodore II (before 861 – after 869)
- Niephorus II (mentioned in 879)
- Sergius (8th – 11th century)
- Ephraem of Caria (11th century)
- Joseph (10th century)
- Anonymous (10th century)
- John I (mentioned in 997)
- Leo the Deacon (10th - 11th century)
- Eustation II (11th century)
- Anonymous (after 1025 - before 1043)
- John II (mentioned in 1030)
- Constantine (mentioned in 1032)
- Ignatius (mentioned in 1039)
- John III? (first half of the 11th century)
- Demetrius (mentioned in 1054)

Isaias of Stauropolis attended the Council of Florence (1439) and fled to avoid signing the decree of union.

== Catholic titular see ==
The see (Latin: Archidioecesis Stauropolitana) survives only as a titular see (archdiocese) of the Roman Catholic Church:

- Diego Hortiago de Escacena (28 August 1693 – 1696)
- Aloisio Scacoz (2 December 1831 – February 22, 1842)
- Guglielmo Massaia (August 2, 1881 – August 6, 1889)
- Francesco Domenico Reynaudi (Raynaud) (May 5, 1885 – July 24, 1893)
- Alessandro de Risio (November 30, 1896 – April 20, 1901)
- Aurelio Zonghi (January 9, 1902 – June 27, 1902)
- Giovanni Battista Guidi (September 6, 1902 – July 22, 1904)
- Saint Guido Maria Conforti (November 14, 1904 – December 12, 1907)
- Bernard Christen (May 29, 1908 – March 11, 1909)
- Emilio Maria Miniati (April 29, 1909 – March 17, 1918)
- Ricardo Isaza y Goyechea (July 19, 1918 – June 28, 1929)
- Giovanni Battista Dellepiane (July 18, 1929 – August 13, 1961)
- Joseph Wilhelmus Maria Baeten (September 8, 1961 – August 26, 1964)
- Gabriel Thohey Mahn-Gaby (November 9, 1964 – June 19, 1971) of Rangoon
