= Sann Win =

Burmese football manager

Team information
- Current team: Chin United

International career
Years	Team	Apps	(Gls)
- Myanmar

Sann Win (Burmese: ဆန်းဝင်း) is a Burmese head coach of Chin United, Myanmar National League.

== International career ==
He is now the head coach for the Myanmar national football team. He was a former Myanmar Football Player.
