= Gabriel Thohey Mahn-Gaby =

- Archbishop Emeritus of Yangon
- Church: Catholic Church
- Archdiocese: Archdiocese of Yangon
- In office: 19 June 1971 – 30 September 2002
- Predecessor: Victor Léon Jean Pierre Marie Bazin
- Successor: Charles Maung Bo
- Previous posts: Titular Archbishop of Stauropolis (1964-1971); Coadjutor Archbishop of Rangoon (1964-1971)

Orders
- Ordination: 21 December 1951
- Consecration: 2 February 1965 by Victor Léon Jean Pierre Marie Bazin

Personal details
- Born: 19 September 1927 Lower Burma, Burma Province, British Raj, British Empire
- Died: 5 May 2016 (aged 88)

Gabriel Thohey Mahn-Gaby (19 September 1927 – 5 May 2016) was a Catholic archbishop.

Ordained to the priesthood in 1951, Mahn served as coadjutor archbishop of the Archdiocese of Yangon (Rangoon), Myanmar from 1964 to 1971. He then served as archbishop from 1971 to 2002. During his stay in office the name of the archdiocese was changed from Rangoon to Yangon.
