= Botataung Township =

Township of Yangon, Myanmar

Botahtaung Township ဗိုလ်တစ်ထောင် မြို့နယ်
- Township of Yangon
- Botahtaung Township
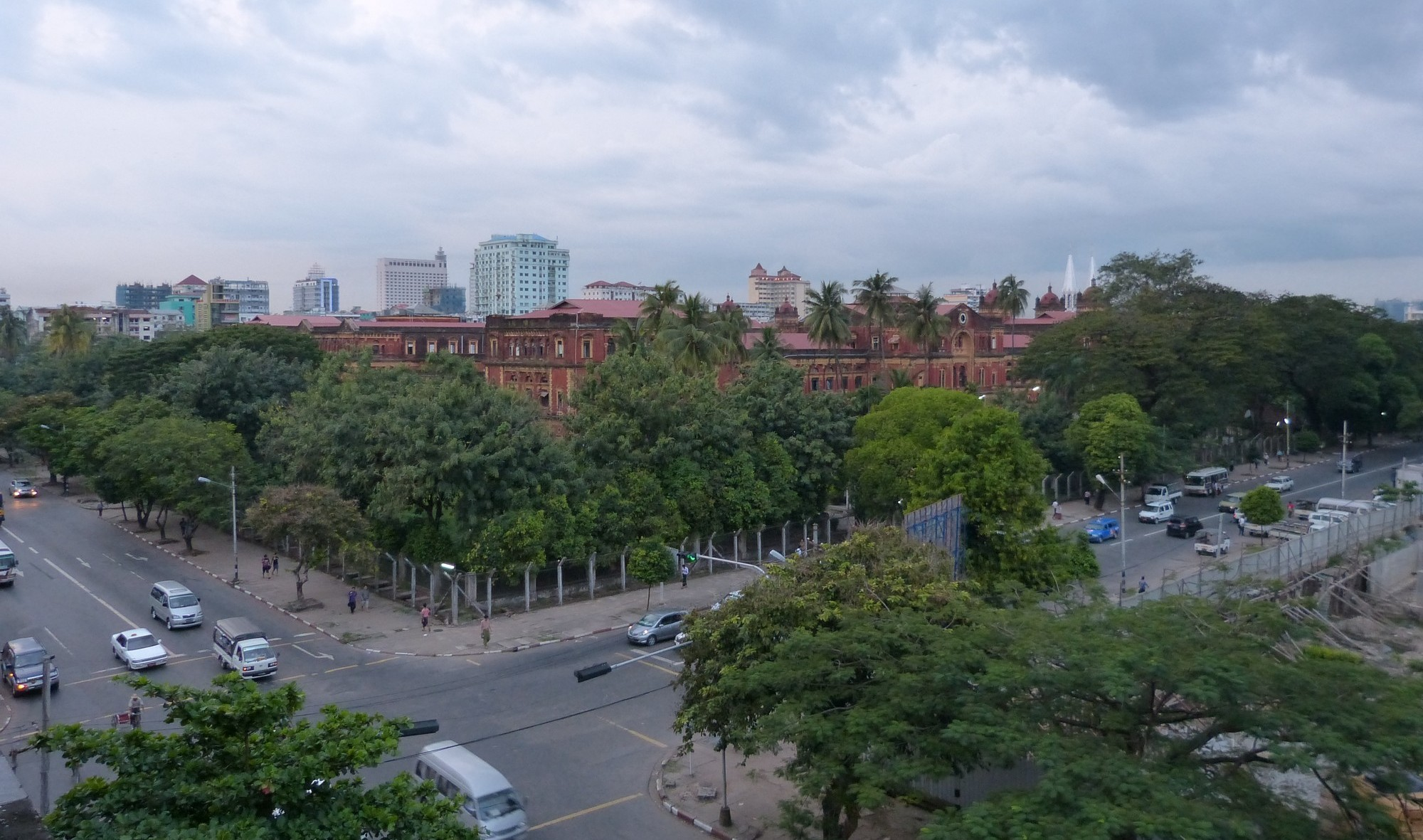
- The Secretariat and city block

- Location within Myanmar
- Coordinates: 16°46′3″N 96°9′5″E
- Country: Myanmar
- Region: Yangon Region
- City: Yangon
- District: Botataung District

Area
  - Total: 2.4 km^{2} (0.92 sq mi)
- Elevation: 1.8 m (6 ft)

Population (2000)
  - Total: 42,000
  - Density: 18,000/km^{2} (46,000/sq mi)
- Time zone: UTC6:30 (MST)
- Postal codes: 11161, 11162, 11163
- Area codes: 1 (mobile: 80, 99)

Botataung Township (Burmese: ဗိုလ်တစ်ထောင် မြို့နယ် [bòtətʰàʊɰ̃ mjo̰nɛ̀]; also Botahtaung Township) is an area of Yangon, Myanmar. Named after the Botahtaung Pagoda, the township consists of ten wards, and shares boundaries with Pazundaung Township in the north and east, Seikkan Township and Yangon River in the south, Kyauktada Township in the west and Mingala Taungnyunt township in the north.

The township has five primary schools, two middle schools, six high schools and a university. The township is home to three public and three private hospitals, including East Yangon General Hospital, also called Gandhi Hospital, one of the major hospitals in Yangon. One of the country's two Burmese language dailies, Kyemon, is based out of here. (The township used to boast four national dailies--Kyemon, and the now defunct newspapers, The Botathaung and Loketha Pyithu Neizin, the Burmese-language version of the Working People's Daily.)

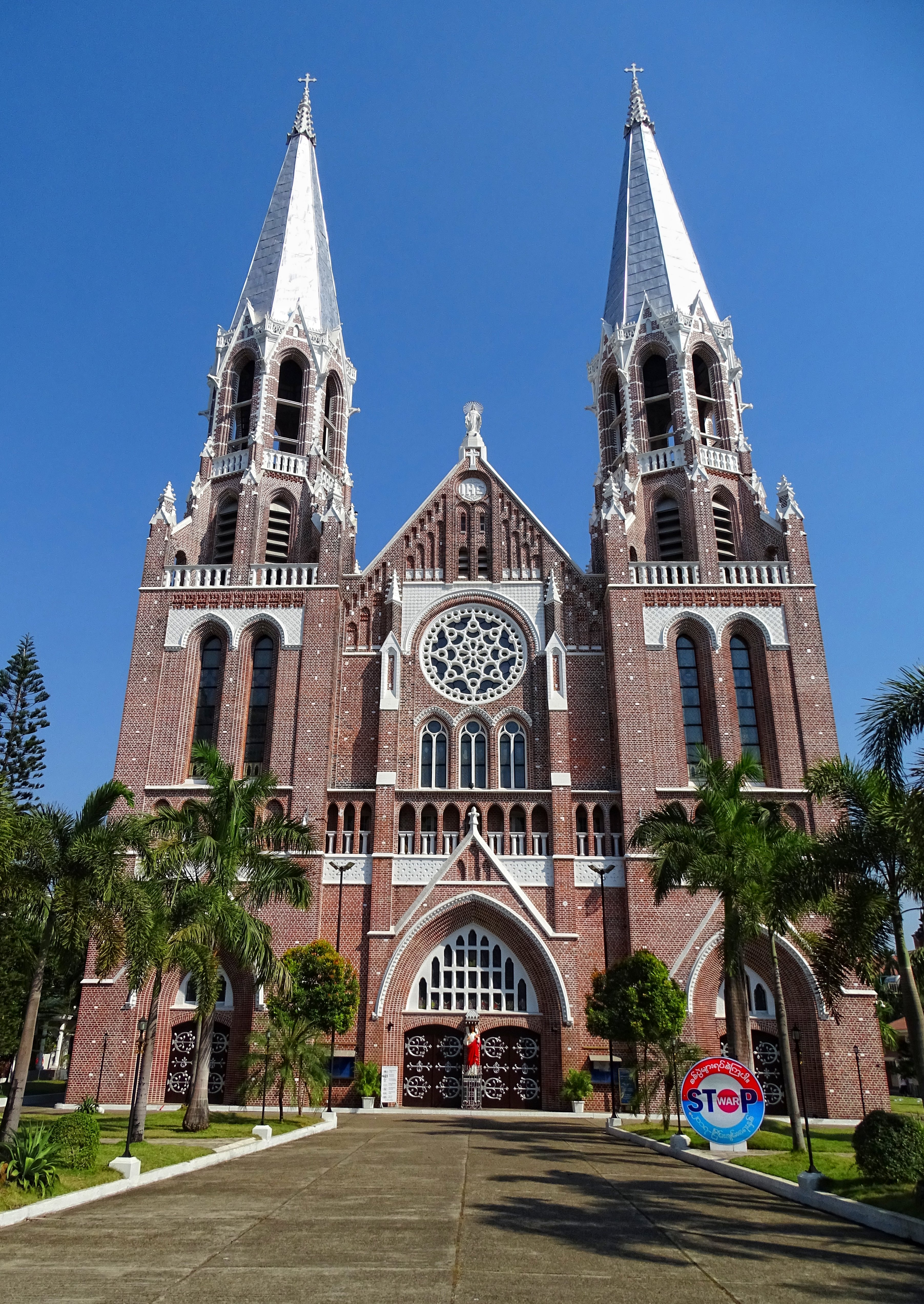
St. Mary's Cathedral at the corner of Bo Aung Kyaw Road

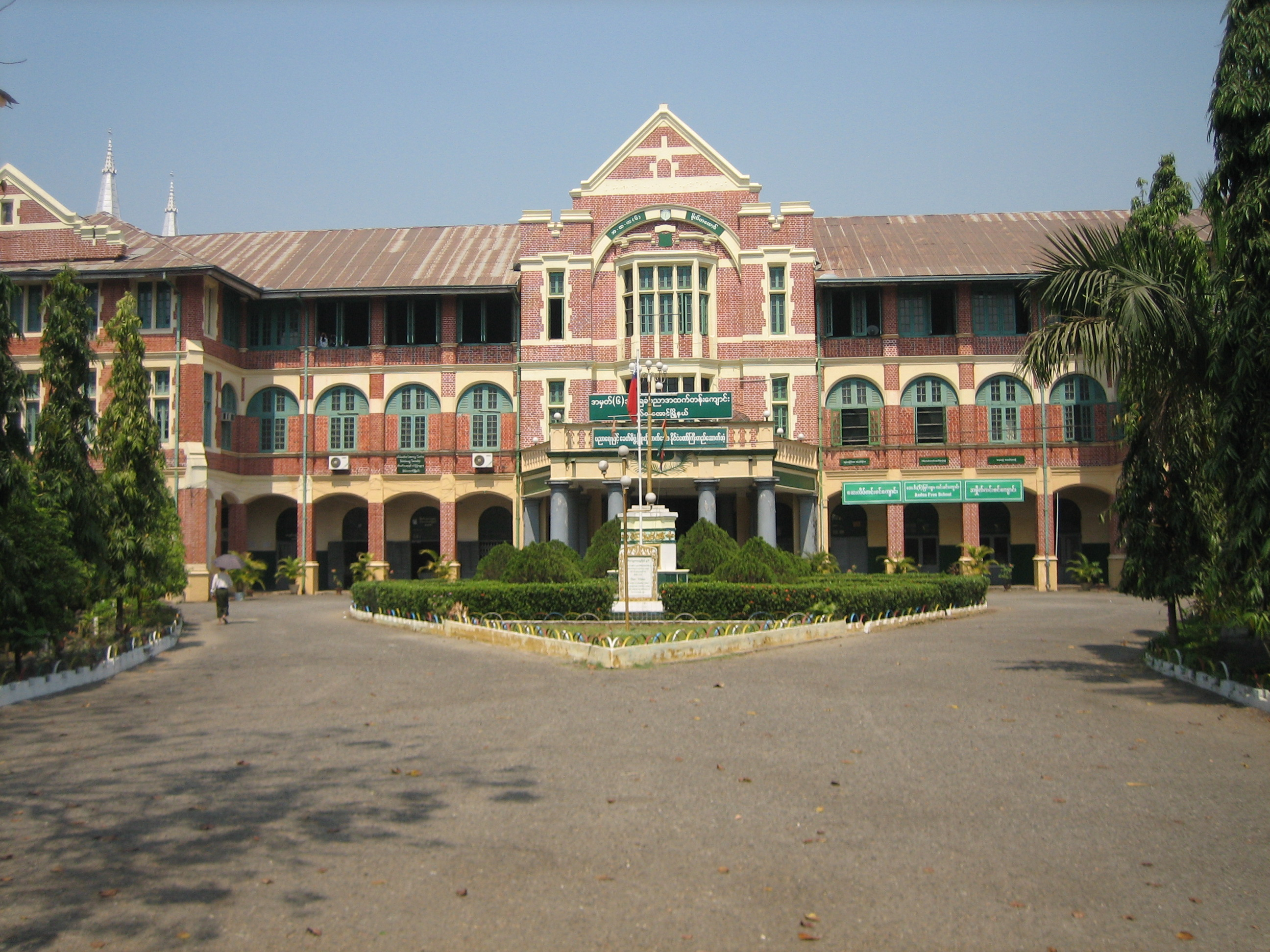
Basic Education High School 6 Botahtaung

In October 2012, Pearl Land Company won a rental bid from the Myanma Port Authority to redevelop the Botahtaung jetty into a recreation area with hotels.

== Population ==
As of March 2018, the population in Botataung Township is reported to be around 40,000, with females being over 21,000 and males being over 18,000.

== Landmarks ==
As Botahtaung township was part of the original city plan implemented by the British, it still has many colonial-era buildings. Some of the buildings and structures of "architectural significance" are now designated landmarks by the Yangon City Development Committee.

Structure	Type	Address	Notes
Botahtaung Pagoda	Pagoda	Strand Road	Original arrival place of 8 strands of the Buddha hair relic. Today, contains one hair of the Buddha encased in a unique, hollow chedi restored after World War II. Also features a Buddha image recovered from the British in 1948.
Ciyin Baptist Church	Church	152 Bo Myat Tun Road	
Compressor Station		233-237 Maha Bandula Road	
Ministers' Building (Secretariat)	Government office	300 Theinbyu Road	The administrative center of the British government from 1889. The site of Gen. Aung San's assassination in 1947. No longer in use.
BEHS 2 Botahtaung	School	152 Bo Myat Tun Road	formerly, St. Peter's High School
BEHS 4 Botahtaung	School	300 Theinbyu Road	formerly, St. Mary's Convent School
BEHS 5 Botahtaung	School	Corner of Anawrahta Road and 45 street	
BEHS 6 Botahtaung	School	Anawrahta Road	formerly, St. Paul's English High School
Printing & Publishing Enterprise		228 Theinbyu Road	
St. Mary's Cathedral	Church	372 Bo Aung Kyaw Road	Largest cathedral in Myanmar

== See also ==
- National Management Degree College (NMDC)
