= Diocese of Hpa-an (Catholic) =

Latin Catholic diocese in Myanmar

Coordinates: 16.8776°N 97.6231°E

Diocese of Hpa-an Dioecesis Hpaanensis

Location
- Country: Myanmar
- Ecclesiastical province: Yangon
- Metropolitan: Yangon

Statistics
- Area: 30,164 km^{2} (11,646 sq mi)
- Population: Total; Catholics: (as of 2012); 1,196,000; 8,771 (0.7%)
- Parishes: 12

Information
- Denomination: Catholic Church
- Sui iuris church: Latin Church
- Rite: Roman Rite
- Established: 24 January 2009
- Cathedral: Cathedral of St. Francis Xavier in Hpa-An

Current leadership
- Pope: Leo XIV
- Bishop: Stanislaus Min Ko
- Metropolitan Archbishop: Charles Maung Bo
- Bishops emeritus: Justin Saw Min Thide

The Diocese of Hpa-an (Lat: Diocesis Hpaanensis) is a Latin Catholic diocese of the Catholic Church in Hpa-An, Kayin State. The diocese was erected on January 24, 2009 from the Archdiocese of Yangon. The current bishop of the diocese is Stanislaus Min Ko, who succeeded Justin Saw Min Thide, the first bishop of the Diocese, on 26 March 2026.

== See also ==
- Catholic Church in Burma
