= St. Mary's Cathedral, Yangon =

Saint Mary's Cathedral
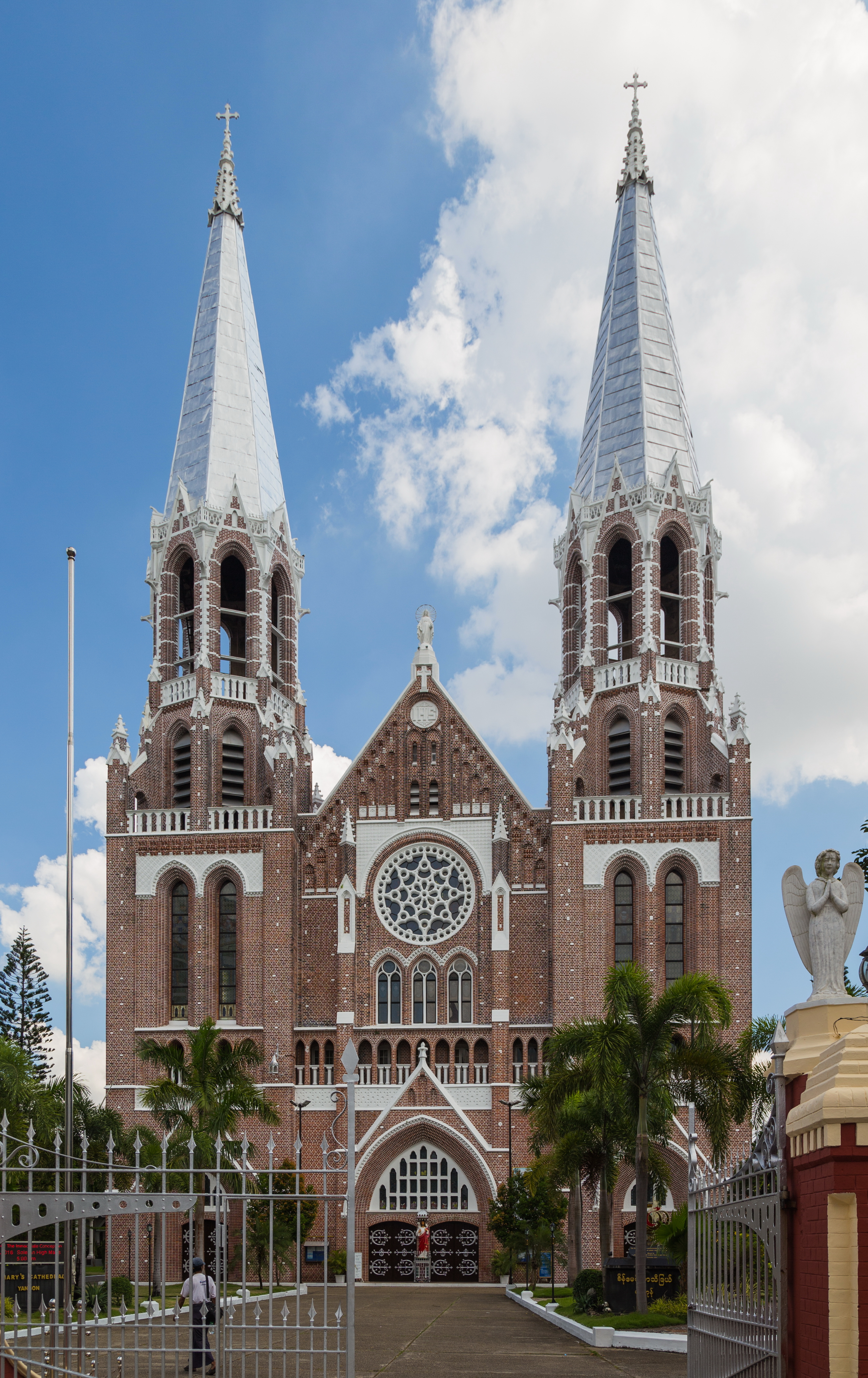

- Location within Myanmar
- 16°46′42.81″N 96°9′55.60″E
- Location: Bo Aung Kyaw Street, Botahtaung Township, Yangon
- Country: Myanmar
- Denomination: Roman Catholic Church

History
- Consecrated: 1910

Architecture
- Heritage designation: Yangon City
- Designated: 1996
- Architect: Joseph Cuypers
- Style: Gothic Revival
- Groundbreaking: 1895
- Completed: 1899

Designations

Yangon City Landmark

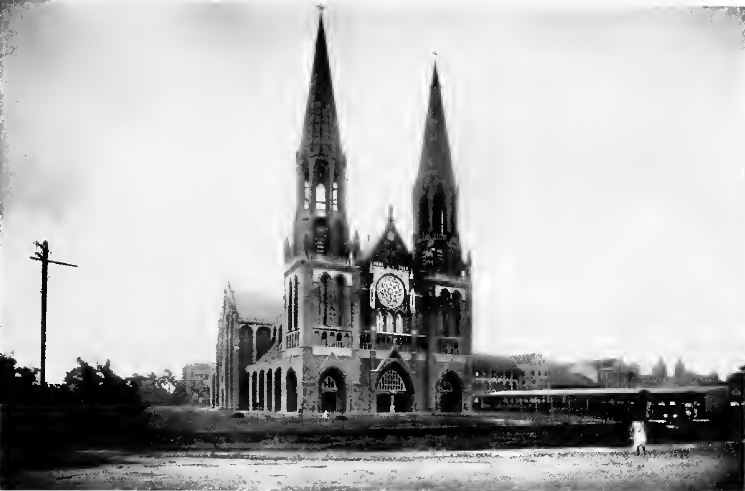
St Mary Cathedral in 1890s

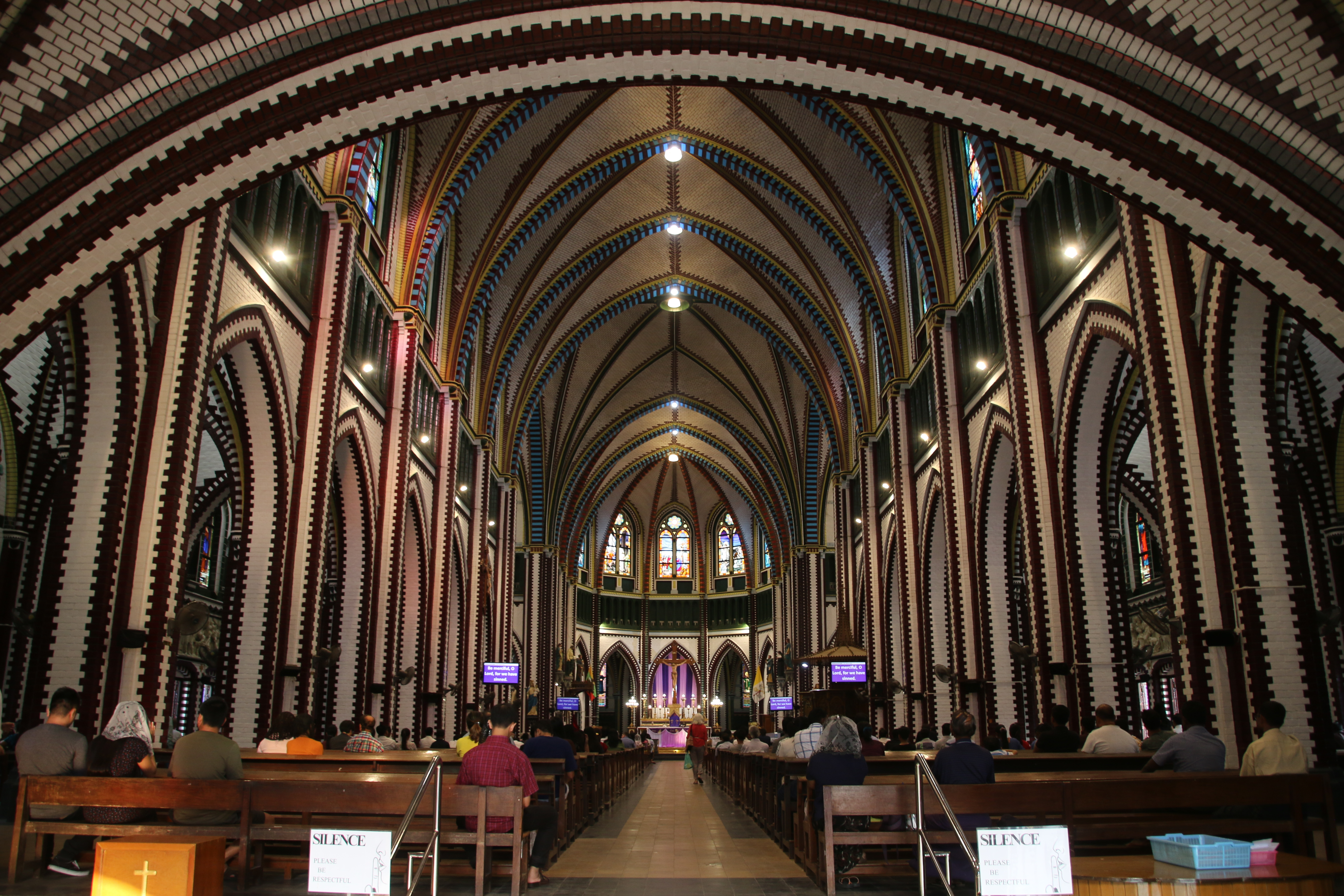
Interior of St Mary's Cathedral

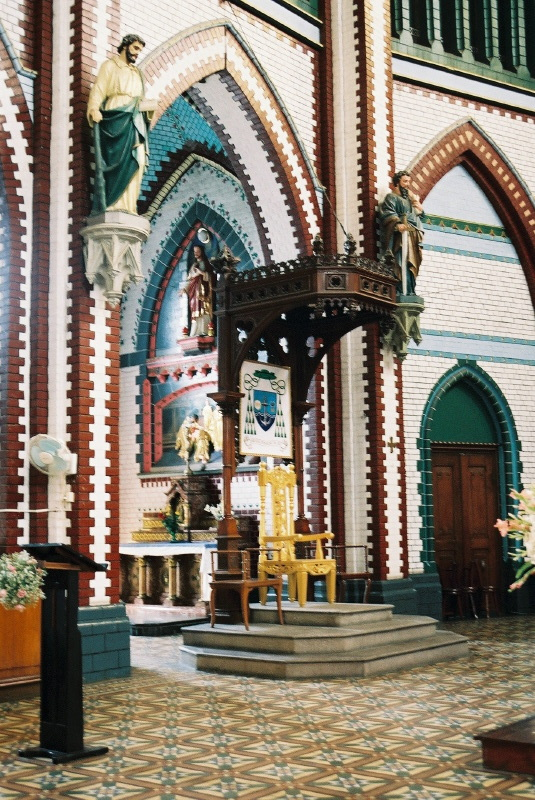
Interior of St Mary's Cathedral

Saint Mary's Cathedral or Immaculate Conception Cathedral is a Catholic cathedral located on the corner of Bogyoke Aung San Road and Bo Aung Kyaw Street in Botahtaung Township, Yangon, Myanmar. The cathedral's red-brick exterior consists of spires and a bell tower. It was designed by Dutch architect Joseph Cuypers, son of Pierre Cuypers.

The cathedral is the largest in Burma. Located on the grounds of the cathedral is Basic Education High School No. 6 Botataung, which is locally known as "Saint Paul's High School", although it has no religious affiliation with the Catholic Church today.

== History of the origin and construction ==
Construction began in 1895 and was completed 19 November 1899 under a land grant from the Government of India, whilst Lower Burma was a province of British India. During the 1930 Rangoon earthquake, St. Mary's Cathedral suffered little damage and it withstood the Japanese invasion during World War II. However, the cathedral's stained glass windows were damaged during the Allied invasion of Rangoon.

=== Bishop Paul Bigandet's work for a new cathedral ===
For some time before his death, Paul Bigandet MEP (1856–1894), Vicar Apostolic of Burma, started planning of a new and larger cathedral, as the Catholic community in the city was growing. It was decided that the new structure should take the form of a metropolitan cathedral of considerable size and of the best architectural design.

A suitable piece of land measuring over fifteen acres east of St. Paul's High School was found, and the Bishop submitted an application to the Government of Burma, asking permission to sell, as a freehold, the site of the old cathedral, with a view to the proceeds being entirely applied towards the expenditure of erecting the new cathedral.

The concession of the land applied for was, in the Chief Commissioner's opinion, excessive, but he was prepared to recommend that the government should sanction the grant of so much of the remaining portion "on either side of St. Paul's school as is at the disposal of the Government: viz, about five subsidiary buildings, provided that the site of the present Cathedral is relinquished to the Government."

The Bishop in his reply pointed out that his plea to sell the site of the old cathedral was based on similar concessions made by the government, only a few years previously, to other Christian communities. It was for the government to decide whether the Catholic community should be treated with equal liberality.

Two months later, on 23 January 1893, the French Bishop was informed that the Government of India sanctioned the proposal to sell the site of the cathedral in Barr Street and to appropriate the proceeds for the erection of a new one. Just prior to the commencement of this project, Bishop Bigandet died.

=== Bishop Alexandre Cardot and a new cathedral ===
Bishop Bigandet was succeeded by Bishop Alexandre Cardot MEP (1893–1925). A deed of grant was executed and signed by the Secretary to the Commissioner of the Revenue Department and by Bishop Cardot. No time was lost in commencing the foundations of the future edifice.

Under the supervision of Mr. H. Hoyne-Fox, consulting architect to the Burmese Government, plans for a Cathedral of the Byzantine model was drawn up. These plans provided for the erection of a dome over the junction of the nave, choir and transepts. As the first efforts to sink the foundation resulted in the discovery of a marshy and yielding substratum, it was decided to drive down into the substratum a series of pyinkado piles, eighteen feet long and three feet in girth as a basis upon which to build. This tedious work was started in June, 1895, and concluded on 1 January 1899. While these important changes were in progress, Bishop Cardot, at the urgent advice of his doctors, was compelled to go back to France. Mr Hoyne-Fox was proceeding on long leave, and there was no one to replace him in carrying on the work of supervisor and consulting architect. The Bishop, therefore, was asked to search in Europe for an architect.

=== Father Hendrick Janzen and Bishop Cardot ===
Among the students assembled for Ordination, one was noticeable for his pallid and worn aspect and emaciated figure. Bishop Cardot enquired as to his identity and learned that Rev. Father Janzen (30 September 1858 – 1 August 1911) had been sent home on account of his suffering from tuberculosis two years previously.

Father Janzen had studied in the "École Polytechnique" under Dr. Pierre Cuypers, a Dutch architect, who designed many of the catholic churches built in the Netherlands, as well as the Rijksmuseum at Amsterdam. Father Janzen had collaborated with Dr. Cuyper's son, Joseph Cuypers, himself an architect, in the erection of the Amsterdam museum.

Bishop Cardot prevailed upon the Superiors of the Paris Foreign Missions Society to allow Father Janzen to accompany him back to Rangoon. Father Janzen went to his native Netherlands to consult his old classmate, Dr. Cuypers Jr. who prepared a new plan for a French Catholic Cathedral in Neo-Gothic style. In November 1898, Bishop Cardot and Father Janzen arrived at Rangoon.

=== Father Hendrick Janzen and a new cathedral ===
To adapt the existing foundation to the new plan, Father Janzen set about to extend the first plan. The altered structure was to be thirty feet longer and capable of seating 1,500 people. Thus, the size of the cathedral was 291 feet (89 m) in length and 101 feet (31 m) in breath. As a basis, a layer of sand nine feet in depth was substituted for pyinkado piles while an additional hundred of the latter was driven down to strengthen and support the rest. The cornerstone of white marble was solemnly blessed and laid by Bishop Cardot on 19 November 1899.

Father Janzen found only bricks and cement, an army of untrained coolies and a few Chinese maistries. The secret of Father Janzen's construction lay in his close and constant supervision and in his patience and perseverance. Never tired of training and directing his subordinates, he simplified their labor by providing them with wooden rules, frames, and other devices to render their operations more mechanical and exact. By the aid of reinforced concrete and wooden moulds, he fabricated tiled and decorative blocks of every description. Many of them he bored through to make them lighter and to save material in such a way, however, as to interfere in no way with their strength and solidity. Father Janzen sawed through the connection between the towers and the rest of the edifice from top to bottom so as not to damage the main structure. The sinking slowly continued, so much so, that Father Jazen abandoned the idea of adding spires.

The sinking stopped for more than a year and Father Janzen began the work of constructing the spires, 86 feet above the towers.

=== Accident ===
On August 11, 1907, Father Janzen slipped on a plank and fractured his thigh in three places. Father Janzen came out of the hospital permanently crippled. Thanks however, to the supervision of the Chinese maistry, Ah Yen, who for the preceding eight years had been his principal assistant, the construction continued.

The Most Rev. Dr. Kelly, Archbishop of Sydney, had this to say in the Catholic Press of Sydney of the cathedral and Father Janzen:

"The Cathedral at Rangoon, now almost complete in the exterior outline, is a work of genius, it has twin spires rising from its façade, and so setting their surmounting crosses as a to draw the visitor's attention. Father Janzen lives hidden away in his single room in the ground floor having but the plainest technical apparatus, restricted to very scant funds, and quite uncertain as to the future. For many months, he has been deprived of the consolation of celebrating Mass, on account of a fractured limb, which no longer serves for standing at the altar. Yet, the Cathedral works and keeps going; designs are forthcoming as required by each detail of workmanship; expedients for overcoming difficulties and for accommodating the disarrangement are invented; and many curses, which have nonplussed professional skill in Burma, have been successfully dealt with by the wonderful spirit that dwells in the dying and broken body of this devoted priest."

=== Dedication ===
The cathedral was dedicated as Our Lady of Immaculate Conception on 22 February 1911. The names of the chief donors were written on it, and it was signed by Rev. Father P. St. Guily.

Five months after the dedication, on 1 August 1911, Father Janzen died and was interred at the entrance to the nave of the cathedral. A plain inlaid marble slab indicated the spot whereafter "life's fitful fever, he sleeps well".

A new Cathedral and sad disasters: The earthquake of May 5, 1930, wrought havoc in the city. The cathedral behaved splendidly under the shock it received. Only two interior vaults came down and others showed a few cracks. Two arches next to the towers were badly cracked but in a few months repairs were completed.

The cathedral well withstood the Japanese bombings of 1941–42 but the Allied bombing of 14 December 1944 blew all the stained glasses to smithereens. They were redone with the ordinary local made glasses.

On 2 May 2008, again the cathedral glasses were strongly hit and damaged by the Cyclone Nargis. This time, tarpaulin sheets were used to fix the broken glass, as it would have costed a lot for the glass to be replaced.

== Information ==
Cathedral address: 372, Bo Aung Kyaw Street, Botahtaung Township, Yangon, Myanmar. Tel: (95)-1-245647

- Daily Masses: 6.00 am (English), 5.00 pm (English).
- Sunday Masses: 6.00 am (English), 8.00 am (English), 5.00 pm (Myanmar).

== See also ==
- Yangon City Heritage List
