= Paul Ambroise Bigandet =

French Catholic bishop (1813–1894)

Bishop Apostolic Delegate Paul Ambroise Bigandet MEP
- Church: Catholic Church
- See: Ramatha (Titular See); Ava and Pegu (as Apostolic Delegate)
- Appointed: 1856 (as Apostolic Delegate); 1856 (as Coadjutor Bishop)
- Installed: 1856
- Term ended: 1894
- Previous post: Professor at a seminary (prior to 1836)

Orders
- Ordination: 1837-02-08 by Bishop Charles-Auguste-Marie-Joseph Forbin-Janson, Bishop of Nancy-Toul
- Consecration: 1856-03-30
- Rank: Bishop

Personal details
- Born: August 13, 1813 Melisey, Franche-Comté, France
- Died: March 19, 1894 (aged 80) Rangoon, British Burma
- Denomination: Catholic
- Occupation: Missionary
- Education: Theology

Paul Ambroise Bigandet MEP (13 August 1813 – 19 March 1894) was a French Catholic missionary who served as Bishop of Lower Burma from 1856 to 1894.

== Early life and education ==
Paul Ambroise Bigandet was born on 13 August 1813 in Besançon, France. After receiving his education in the town, he went to Paris, trained for two years at La Société des Missions Etrangères, and was ordained as a Catholic priest in 1837.

== Career ==
After his ordination, he was sent the same year to Burma where he worked as a missionary priest for five years at Tavoy and Mergui. In 1842, he was transferred to the mission of the Straits Settlements at Penang where he spent 14 years, serving at one time as priest of the Church of the Assumption in George Town. There he worked on improving schools, opening a boys’ school managed by the Christian Brotherhood, and a convent and school for girls. In 1846, he was appointed Vicar Apostolic of the Diocese of Malacca-Singapore.

In 1856, he was ordained Titular Bishop of Rama, and went to Burma as Apostolic Administrator of the mission of Pegu and Ava, Lower Burma. When he arrived there were only a few small, struggling missions, and the country was in disorder having just been annexed by the British government. He set about organising and developing the mission, and proceeded to open churches, schools, convents, orphanages, and new mission stations. He continued similar work in Burma for the next 38 years where it was later said that from the date of his arrival “the history of the Roman Catholic Mission in Burma was practically the life of Bishop Bigandet.” Whilst continuing his duties in Burma, he was also appointed Vicar Apostolic of Western Siam in 1866.

He died in 1894 in Rangoon, aged 80.

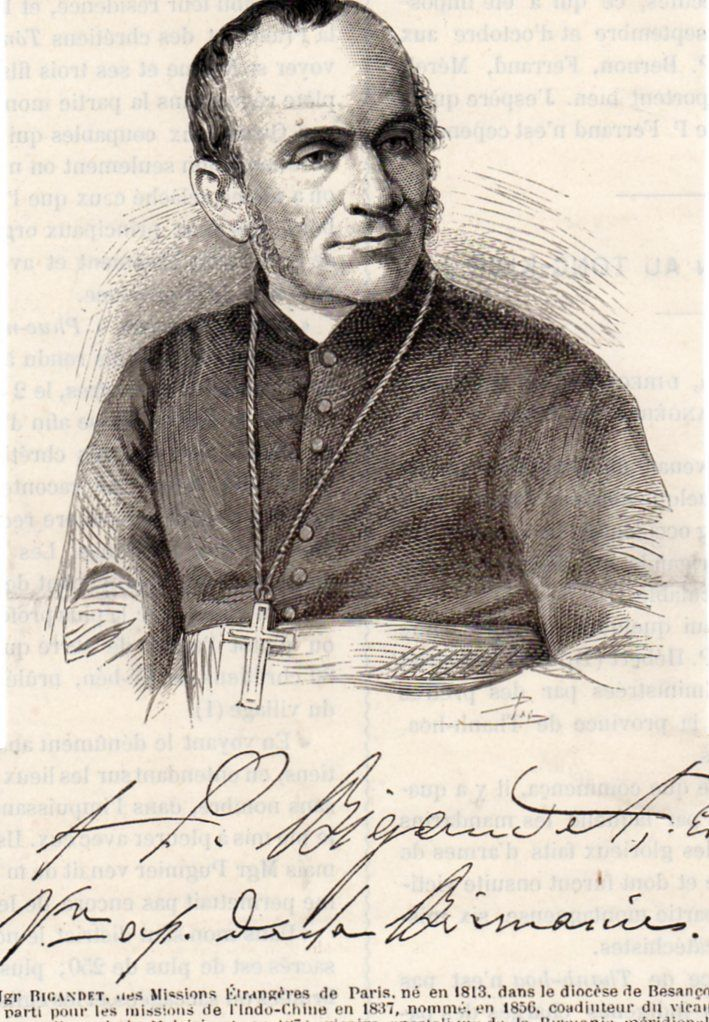
The Rt. Rev. Paul Ambroise Bigandet

== Publications ==
Bigandet was a Pali scholar, the language of Theravada Buddhism, and wrote The Life or Legend of Guadama: the Buddha of the Burmese, which was first published in 1858, and became the standard work of the religion of the Burmese in the nineteenth century.
