= John Berinyuy Tatah =

Cameroonian Catholic prelate (born 1975)

The Most Reverend John Berinyuy Tatah
- Auxiliary Bishop of Bamenda, Cameroon
- Church: Catholic Church
- Archdiocese: Roman Catholic Archdiocese of Bamenda
- See: Bamenda
- Appointed: 13 February 2026
- Installed: 19 March 2026
- Other post: Titular Bishop of Casae Nigrae (since 13 February 2026)

Orders
- Ordination: 30 March 2005
- Consecration: 19 March 2026 by Andrew Nkea Fuanya
- Rank: Bishop

Personal details
- Born: John Berinyuy Tatah; 18 December 1975 (age 50) Mbuluf-Shisong, Archdiocese of Bamenda, Northwest Region, Cameroon

Styles of John Berinyuy Tatah
- Reference style: Your Lordship; The Most Reverend
- Spoken style: His Lordship
- Religious style: Bishop

John Berinyuy Tatah (born 18 December 1975) is a Cameroonian Catholic prelate who was appointed auxiliary bishop of the Roman Catholic Archdiocese of Bamenda, in Cameroon on 13 February 2026. He was contemporaneously assigned Titular Bishop of Casae Nigrae. Before that, from March 2005 until 13 February 2026, he was a priest of the same Catholic archdiocese. He was appointed bishop by Pope Leo XIV. He was consecrated and installed at Bamenda on 19 March 2026.

== Background and education ==
John Berinyuy Tatah was born on 18 December 1975 at Mbuluf-Shisong, Diocese of Kumbo, Northwest Region, in Cameroon. He studied philosophy and theology at the Saint Thomas Aquinas Interdiocesan Major Seminary in Bambui, Archdiocese of Bamenda. He undertook advanced studies in spirituality at the Dominican monastery of Bambui. Later, he was awarded a Doctorate in theology, with specialization in Christian anthropology, by the Pontifical Theological Faculty Teresianum in Rome, Italy.

== Priest ==
He was ordained a priest for the Diocese of Kumbo, Archdiocese of Bamenda, on 30 March 2005. He served as a priest until 13 February 2026. While a priest, he served in various roles and locations, including:

- Parish vicar of Saint Joseph Parish in Bafut from 2005 until 2006.
- Parish priest of Saint Patrick in Babanki-Tungo from 2006 until 2010.
- Advanced studies in spirituality at the Dominican monastery of Bambui.
- Studies at the Pontifical Theological Faculty Teresianum in Rome, Italy leading to the award of a doctorate in theology, specializing in Christian anthropology.
- Spiritual director and lecturer at Saint Thomas Aquinas Major Seminary in Bambui.
- Chaplain of the diocesan charismatic movement.

== Kidnapping ==
On 15 November 2025 Father John Berinyuy Tatah and his vicar were abducted along "the Bamenda-Nkambe ring road, near the town of Babessi by armed men claiming to be separatist fighters from Ambazonia and taken to an unknown location". The two clergy were enroute home after attending Mass to mark the inauguration of the "PAX Institute" at the "University of Ndop". Three days later, four other priests and a lay person who went to negotiate the release of the first two clergy were also captured. On 20 November the vicar, along with the other four clergy and the lay person were released. Father Tatah was held until he was released last on 2 December 2025.

== Bishop ==
On 27 February 2026, Pope Leo XIV appointed Reverend Father John Berinyuy Tatah, previously a member of the clergy of Kumbo Catholic Diocese, as auxiliary bishop of the Archdiocese of Bamenda in Cameroon. He is expected to work with and assist Archbishop Andrew Nkea Fuanya, Archbishop of Bamenda. The consecration of Bishop-Elect John Berinyuy Tatah took place on 19 March 2026. The Principal Consecrator was Andrew Nkea Fuanya, Archbishop of Bamenda assisted by George Nkuo, Bishop of Kumbo and Aloysius Fondong Abangalo, Bishop of Mamfe.

== See also ==
- Catholic Church in Cameroon

== Succession table ==
Catholic Church titles
Preceded by	Auxiliary Bishop of Bamenda (since 13 February 2026)	Succeeded by
