= Diocese of Kumbo =

Roman Catholic diocese in Cameroon

Diocese of Kumbo Dioecesis Kumboensis

catholic
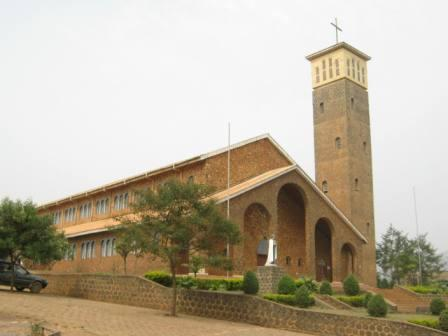
- Kumbo Cathedral

Location
- Country: Cameroon
- Territory: Comprises Bui and Donga-Mantung Divisions.
- Ecclesiastical province: Bamenda
- Metropolitan: Bamenda
- Deaneries: 6
- Coordinates: 6.2053°N 10.6872°E

Statistics
- Area: 8,600 km^{2} (3,300 sq mi)
- Population: Total; Catholics: (as of 2011); 789,000; 202,543 (25.7%)
- Parishes: 27

Information
- Denomination: Roman Catholic
- Rite: Latin Rite
- Established: 18 March 1982
- Cathedral: Cathedral Church of Saint Therese of the Child Jesus
- Secular priests: 83

Current leadership
- Pope: Leo XIV
- Bishop: George Nkuo
- Metropolitan Archbishop: Andrew Nkea Fuanya
- Vicar General: Oliver Shey Ndi, SD
- Episcopal Vicars: Divine Leinyuy Ntani, SD; Francis Bongajum Dor, OFM.Cap

Website
- www.dioceseofkumbo.org

The Roman Catholic Diocese of Kumbo (Latin: Dioecesis Kumboënsis) is a Roman Catholic diocese in the Ecclesiastical Province of Bamenda in Cameroon. The first German settlers were Missionaries of the Sacred Heart who arrived in 1912 and established their mission in 1913. The Diocese of Kumbo was erected by Pope John Paul II on Thursday, 18 March 1982, with territory taken from the then Diocese (now Archdiocese) of Bamenda. It is a suffragan diocese of the Metropolitan See of Bamenda along with the Roman Catholic Dioceses of Buea, Kumba (not to be confused with Kumbo), and Mamfe.

The Diocese of Kumbo is made up of two civil administrative units, namely, Bui and Donga-Mantung Divisions in the North West Region of the Republic of Cameroon. Bui Division is further divided into 6 subdivisions: Kumbo Central, Jakiri, Oku, Mbven, Nkum and Noni, while Donga-Mantung Division is divided into 5 subdivisions, viz: Nkambe Central, Ndu, Ako, Misaje and Nwa.

The territory of Bui and Donga-Mantung Divisions situated in the Bamenda grassfields area of the North West Region of Cameroon covers a surface area of 8,000 square kilometers (3,090 square miles) with a population of approximately 789,000 of whom over 202,543 (25.7%) are Catholics. There are 11 ethnic groups: Nso’ tribe, the Oku tribe and the Noni tribe in Bui Division, and the Wimbum, Mbembe, Jukum, Nchanti, Mfumte, Yamba, Mbaw and Mambila tribes in Donga-Mantung Division. Each of these tribes has its own language and dialects.

Considering the fact that the average annual population growth is about 2.36%, the total population of the diocese has grown from 653,244 in 1998 to 734,052 in 2003. Since the area of the territory is about 8,000 km^{2}, the population density is about 92 people per km^{2}. This is one of the densely populated Catholic dioceses in Cameroon.

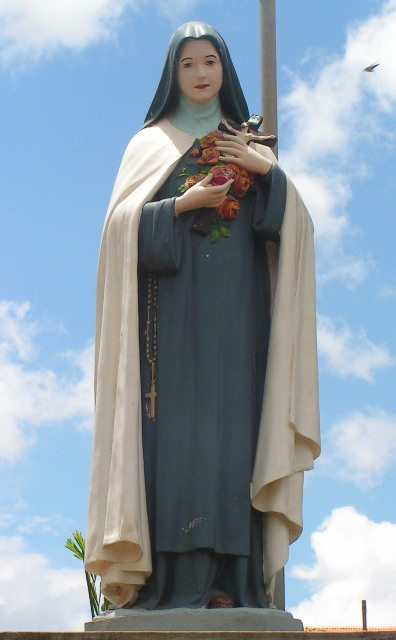
Saint Thérèse of the Child Jesus is honoured as the Principal Patroness of the Cathedral Church of Kumbo Town

== Religious Data ==
There are three main religious groups in the Diocese of Kumbo, namely, the Christians, the Muslims and the adherents of the African Traditional Religion. The present statistics reveal that the adherents of the African Traditional Religion are still the majority, followed by the Christians in the second place and then the Moslems. The Christians are further regrouped into Catholics, Presbyterians, Baptists and some Evangelical and Pentecostal Communities like the Churches of Christ and the Deeper Life Church. The population of this latter group is very insignificant, made up mainly of drop-outs from the other Christian groups.

=== The Catholic Population ===
The Catholic population has continued to grow steadily, with an average of about 4,140 baptisms per year, and about 5,429 catechumens per year.

=== The Protestant Population ===
There are no available statistics from the main Protestant Churches, namely, the Presbyterian Church in Cameroon (PCC) and the Cameroon Baptist Convention (CBC).

The evangelical groups, like the Churches of Christ and Deeper Life Church, which can be considered as sects, recruit their followers from the mainline Protestant Churches. They are very active among students and young people.

=== Islam ===
There are also no available statistics about the Muslims. In the Kumbo urban area there are two Islamic secondary schools and a Teacher Training College.

The Moslem population is made up of the traditionally Islamic tribes, the Hausa people, the Fulanis and the Wodaabe or the Bororo people, who are mostly grazers, and those from the local tribes who have been Islamized. The greater bulk of this category and of the Moslems in general is found among the Nso Tribe. They win some of their converts, especially women, through marriage and by giving cows as bait to the young people who want to get rich overnight.

=== The African Religions ===
The adherents of the African Religions still constitute the bulk of the population. As with Islam, there are no statistics about them.

== Pastoral Zones and Special churches ==
The cathedral is Saint Therese of the Child Jesus Cathedral in Kumbo. Below is a full list of Deaneries and Parishes in the two civil administrative units that make up the Diocese of Kumbo.

=== Bui Division ===
Kumbo Deanery

- Saint Theresia Cathedral Parish, Kumbo
- Immaculate Conception Parish, Tobin
- Immaculate Conception Parish, Kikaikelaki
- Saints Peter and Paul Parish, Kikaikom
- Saint Jude Parish, Mbve
- Saint Michael Parish, Meluf
- Saint Kizito Parish, Melim
- Sacred Heart Parish, Shisong

Tatum Deanery

- Assumption Parish, Mbiame
- Saint Joseph Parish, Ndzevru
- Saint John the Baptist Parish, Ngondzen
- Saint Pius X Parish, Tatum

Nkar Deanery

- Christ the King Parish, Jakiri
- Saint Mary Parish, Nkar
- Saint Therese of the Child Jesus’ Parish, Sop

Djottin Deanery

- Saint Joseph Parish, Djottin
- Saint John the Baptist Parish, Elak-Oku
- Saint Patrick Parish, Nkor

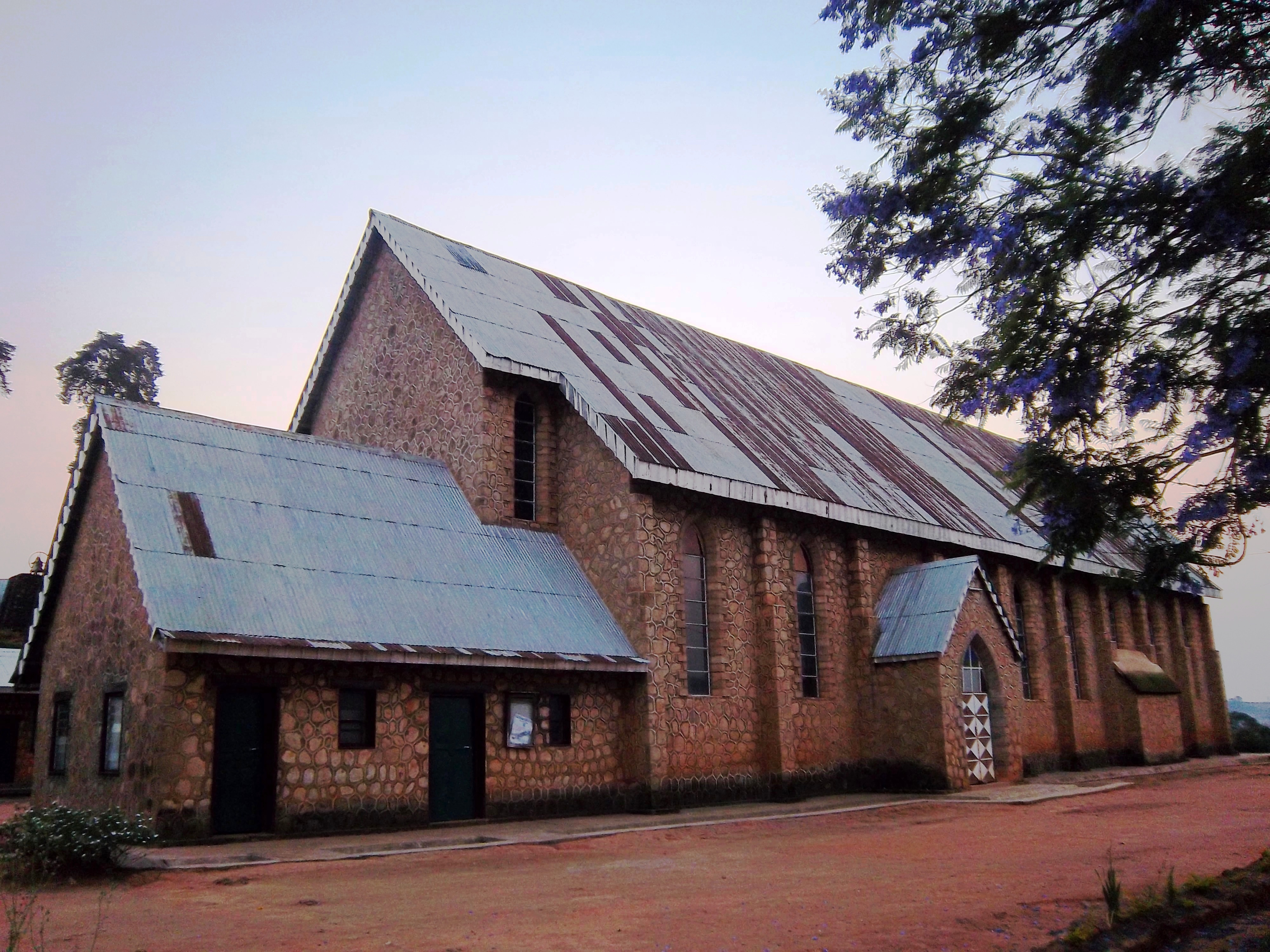
Holy Family Parish Church, Tabenken. Tabenken Parish was opened in 1937 from Shisong.

=== Donga-Mantung Division ===
Tabenken Deanery

- Holy Family Parish, Tabenken
- Saint Martin de Porres Parish, Ndu
- Saints Peter and Paul Parish, Ngarum
- Our Lady of Fatima Parish, Mfumte
- Saint Kizito Parish, Sabongari

Nkambe Deanery

- Saint Mathias Mulumba Parish, Ako
- Saint Martin de Porres Parish, Binju - Nkambe
- Saint John Parish, Misaje
- Christ the King Parish, Nkambe Town

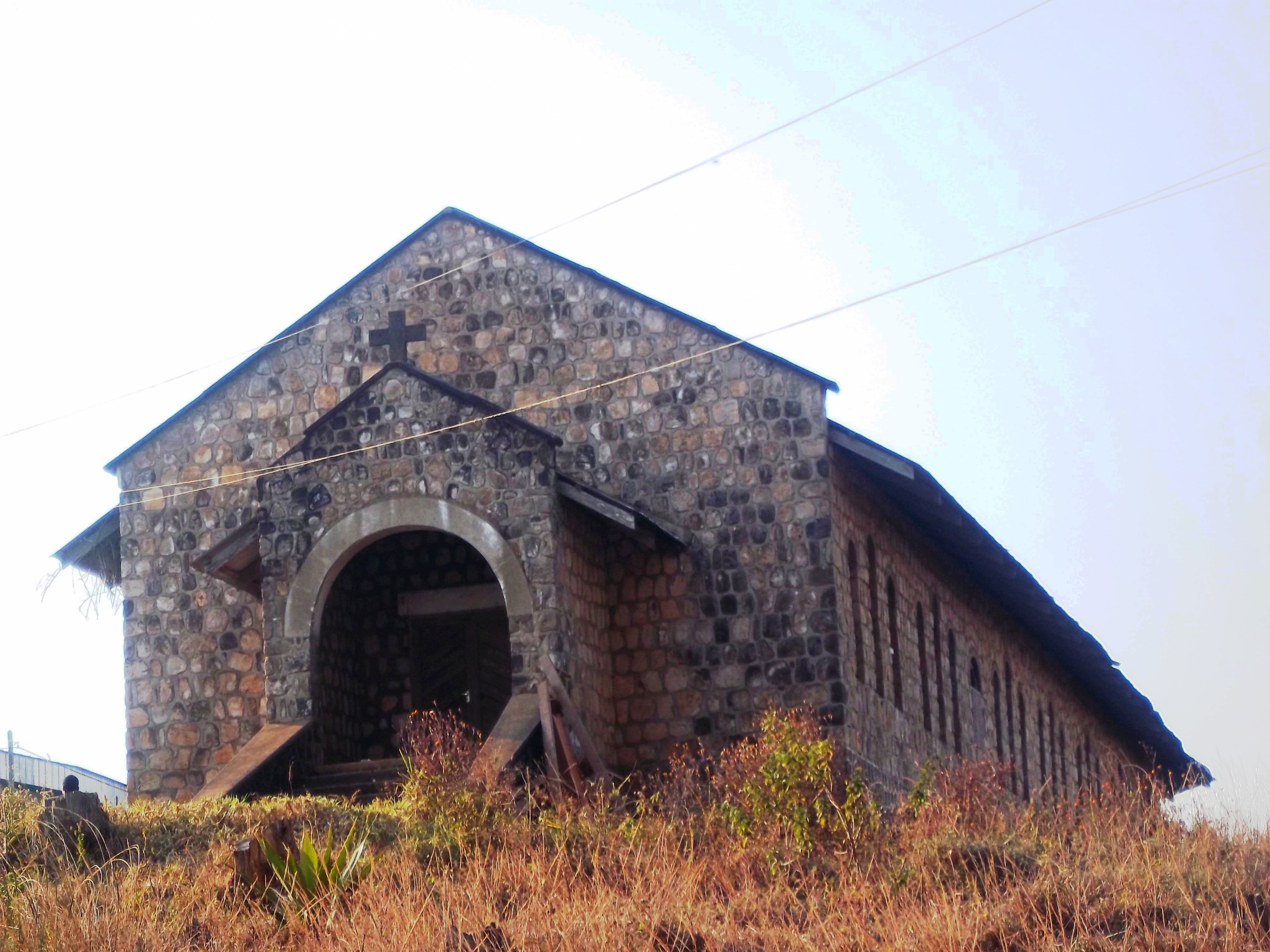
Old Church of Saint Martin de Porres Parish, Binju-Nkambe. Binju-Nkambe was opened in 1955 from Tabenken.

== Bishops ==
- Bishops of Kumbo (Roman rite), in reverse chronological order
- Bishop George Nkuo (since 8 July 2006)
- Bishop Cornelius Fontem Esua (10 September 1982 – 7 December 2004), appointed Coadjutor Archbishop of Bamenda

=== Other priest of this diocese who became bishop ===
- Agapitus Enuyehnyoh Nfon, appointed Auxiliary Bishop of Bamenda in 2011

== Governance ==
The diocese of Kumbo is led by

1. The Bishop
2. The Vicar-General
3. Two Episcopal Delegates or Vicars
4. The Vicar for Catechists
5. The Vicar for Laity
6. The Council of Priests
7. The Chairman for the Association of Diocesan Priests (ADP)

Additionally, there is a Presbyteral Council, various consultative Committees and Commissions and each Deanery has a Dean or a Vicar Forane.

== Religious Communities ==
MALE CONGREGATIONS

Priests

- Saint Joseph's Society for Foreign Missions, (Mill Hill Missionaries), MHM
- Order of Friars Minor Capuchin, O.F.M. Cap
- Congregation of the Priests of the Sacred Heart of Saint Quentin, SCJ
- Order of the Poor Clerics Regular of the Mother of God of the Pious Schools or the Piarist Fathers, (Calasanzians), Sch. P
- Missionary Sons of the Immaculate Heart of Mary - Claretian Missionaries (CMF)
- Rogationists of the Heart of Jesus, RCJ

Brothers

- The Marist Brothers of the Schools (FMS)

FEMALE CONGREGATIONS

=== Sisters ===
- Tertiary Sisters of Saint Francis (TSSF)
- Sisters of Saint Mary of Namur (SSMN)
- Daughters of Our Lady of the Sacred Heart (FDNSC)
- Missionary Sisters of the Immaculate Heart of Mary (ICM)
- Sisters of the Congregation de Notre Dame de Montreal (CND)
- Missionary Sisters of Our Lady of the Holy Rosary (MSHR)
- Daughters of Our Lady on Mount Calvary, (FNSMC)

=== Sisters ===
- Sisters of the Holy Union (SUSC)
- Sisters of Saint Thérèse of the Child Jesus of Buea (SST)
- Handmaids of the Holy Child Jesus, HHCJ
- Sister of Saint Ann, SSA
- Sisters Servants of the Holy Heart of Mary, SSCM
- Sisters of Saint John the Baptist, SJB

== Catholic Education ==
Vocational Training

=== Professional Education ===
- Catholic School of Health Sciences, Shisong-Kumbo
- Catholic University of Cameroon (CATUC)], Bamenda, Kumbo
- Saint Pius X Teacher Training College, Tatum
- Saint Pius X Technical Teacher Training College, Tatum

=== Formation in Pastoral Ministry ===
- Saint Jerome Biblical and Pastoral Institute

Secondary Education

=== Catholic Schools and Colleges ===
- Cardinal Tumi's Catholic Comprehensive College, Mantum-Jakiri
- Our Lady of the Immaculate Conception College, Kumbo
- Regina Pacis Comprehensive High School, Nkar
- Saint Aloysius' Minor Seminary, Kitiwum - Kumbo
- Saint Anthony of Padua's Comprehensive College, Mbohtong - Shisong
- Saint Augustine's College, Nso
- Saint Christopher's Catholic Evening School, Kumbo
- Saint Francis' College, Shisong

=== Catholic Schools and Colleges ===
- Saint John Bosco's Catholic Comprehensive College, Ngarum
- Saint Joseph's Catholic Comprehensive College, Lassin-Nkor
- Saint Peter's Catholic Comprehensive College, Kumbo
- Saint Pius X's Catholic College, Tatum
- Saint Rita's Technical High School, Nkambe
- Saint Sylvester's Catholic Comprehensive High School, Sop
- Saint Theresa's Comprehensive College, Djottin

== Other services ==
The Diocese of Kumbo, in addition to the work within the 27 parishes, operates some services centrally. The best known of these are BEPHA (the Diocesan Service for Health Care), the Printing and Communication Centre (PCC), a Carpentry and Construction Department, a Mechanical and Technical Training Centre (MTTC) and the Catholic Book Centre (CABOC). The Diocese also operates Pilot Agricultural Training Projects at Mfumte, Mbiame and Misaje.

The Diocese is also runs the FACTS Project for Catholic schools and colleges. There are also outreach programmes for orphans and vulnerable children. The diocese is also home to Community Based Organization (CBO) programme for local communities and underprivileged children.

== Gallery ==
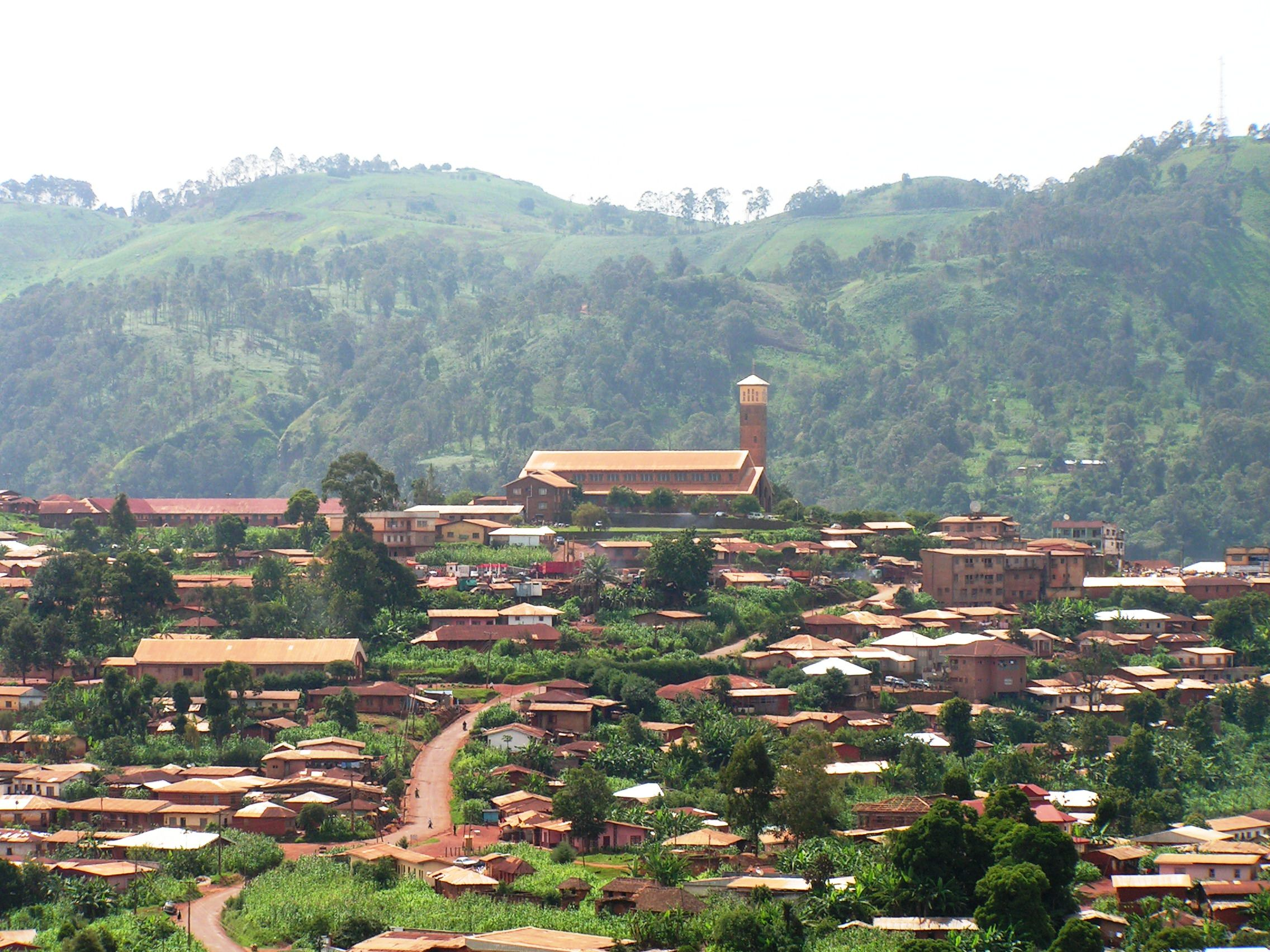
Panorama of the Town of Kumbo, taken from Tobin

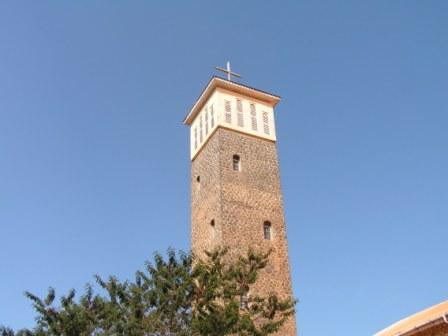
Bell Tower of the cathedral.

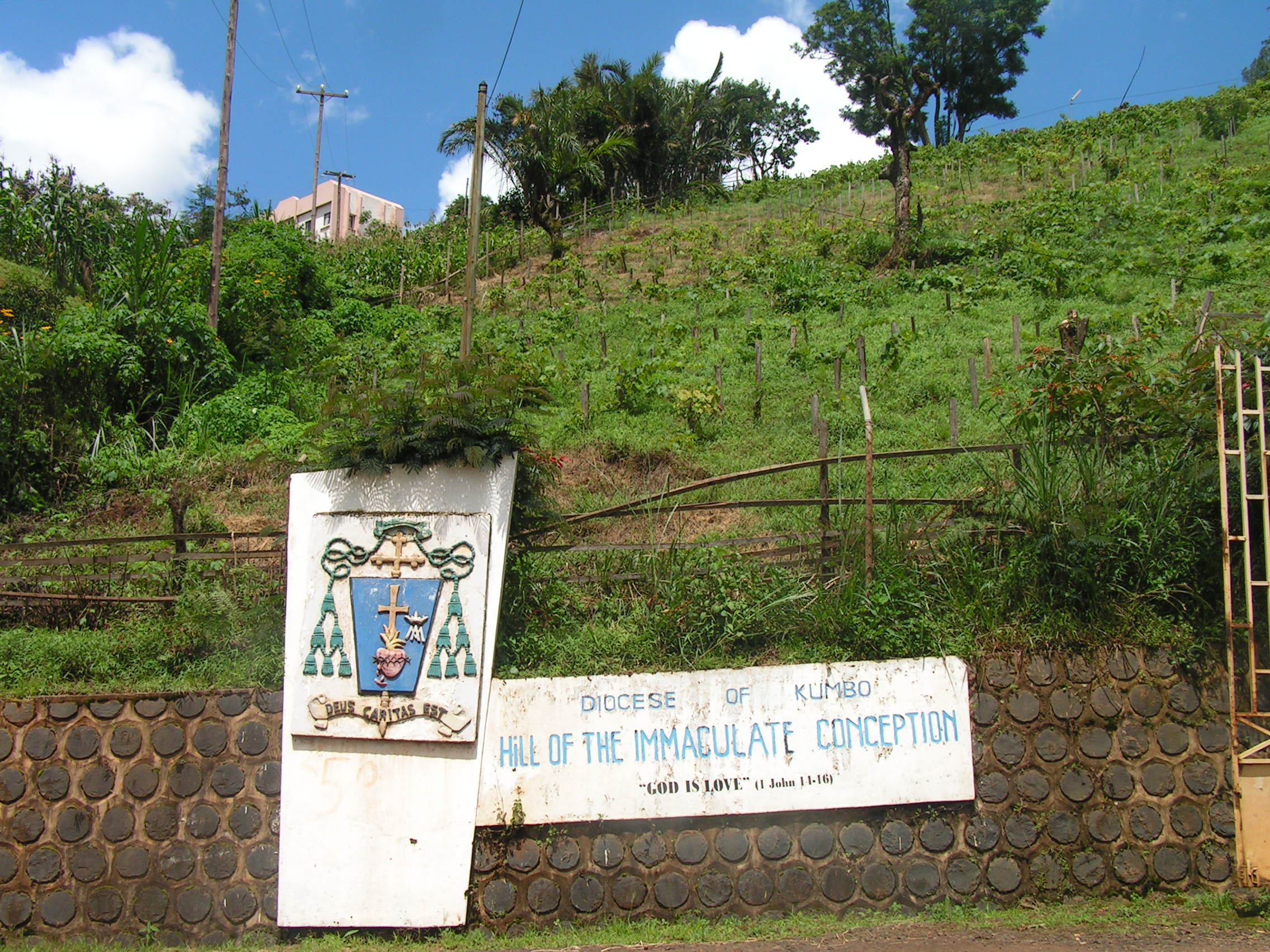
Immaculate Conception Hill

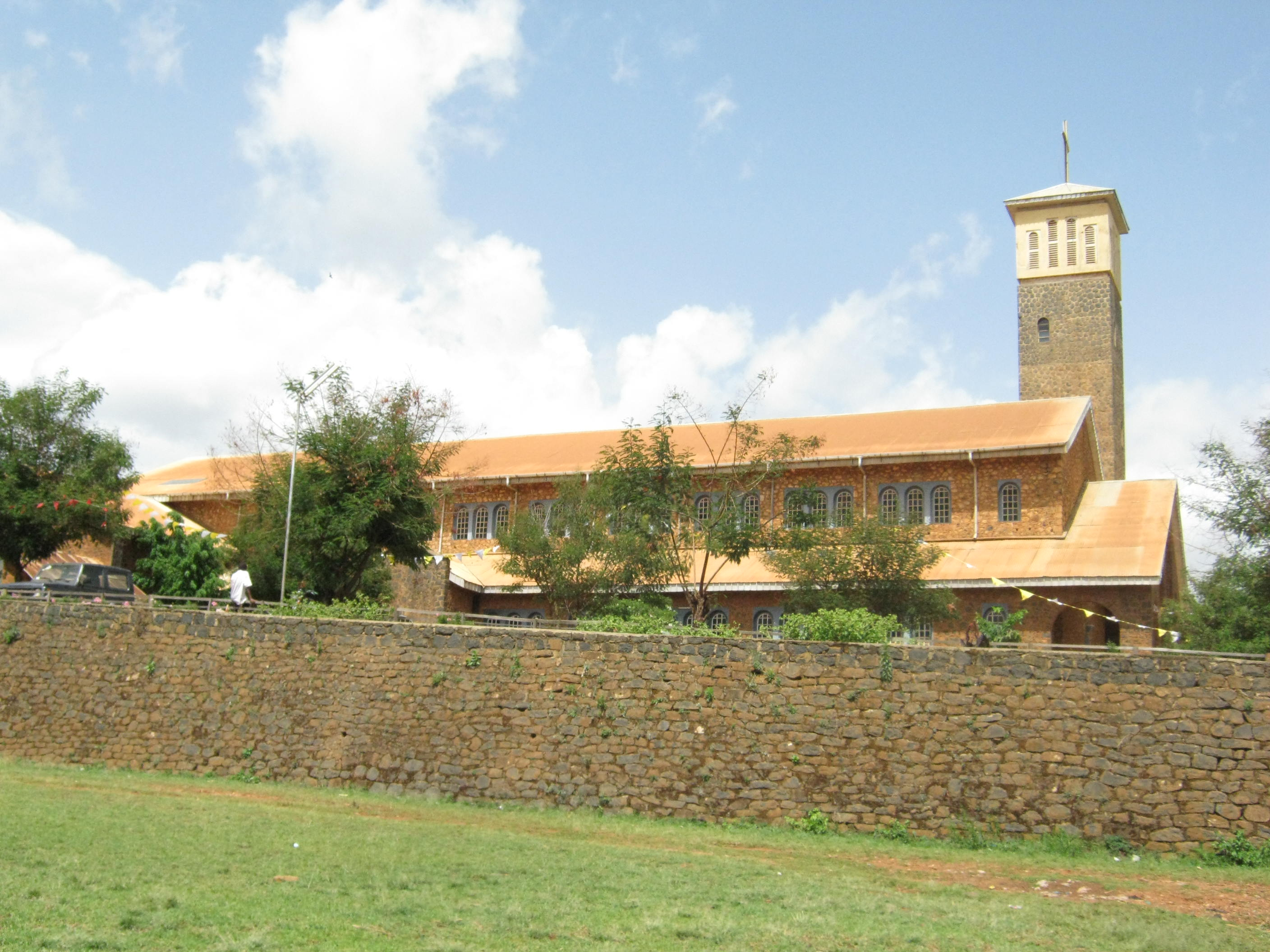
Cathedral from the Bookshop Side

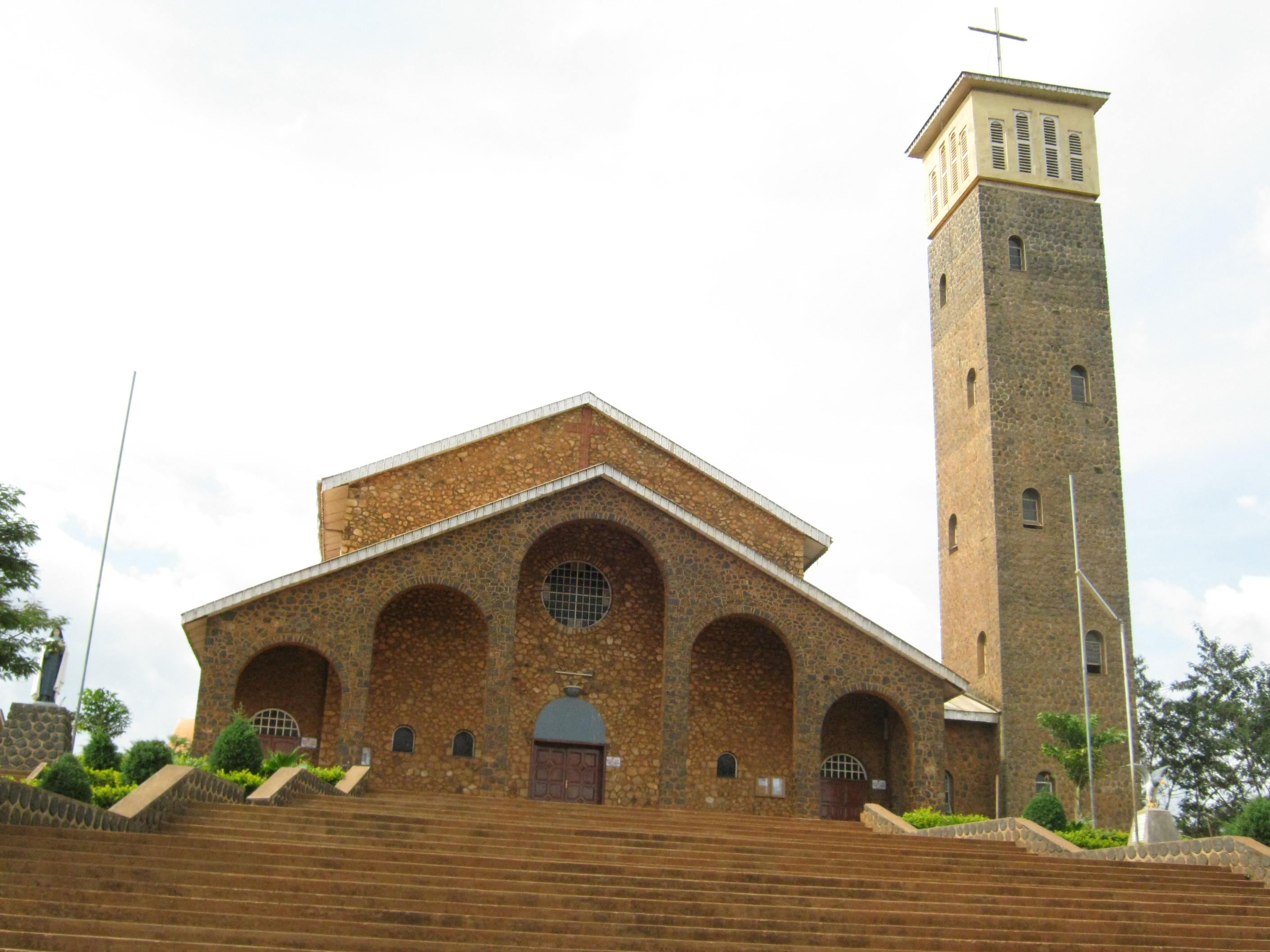
Facade of the Cathedral Parish Church of Kumbo

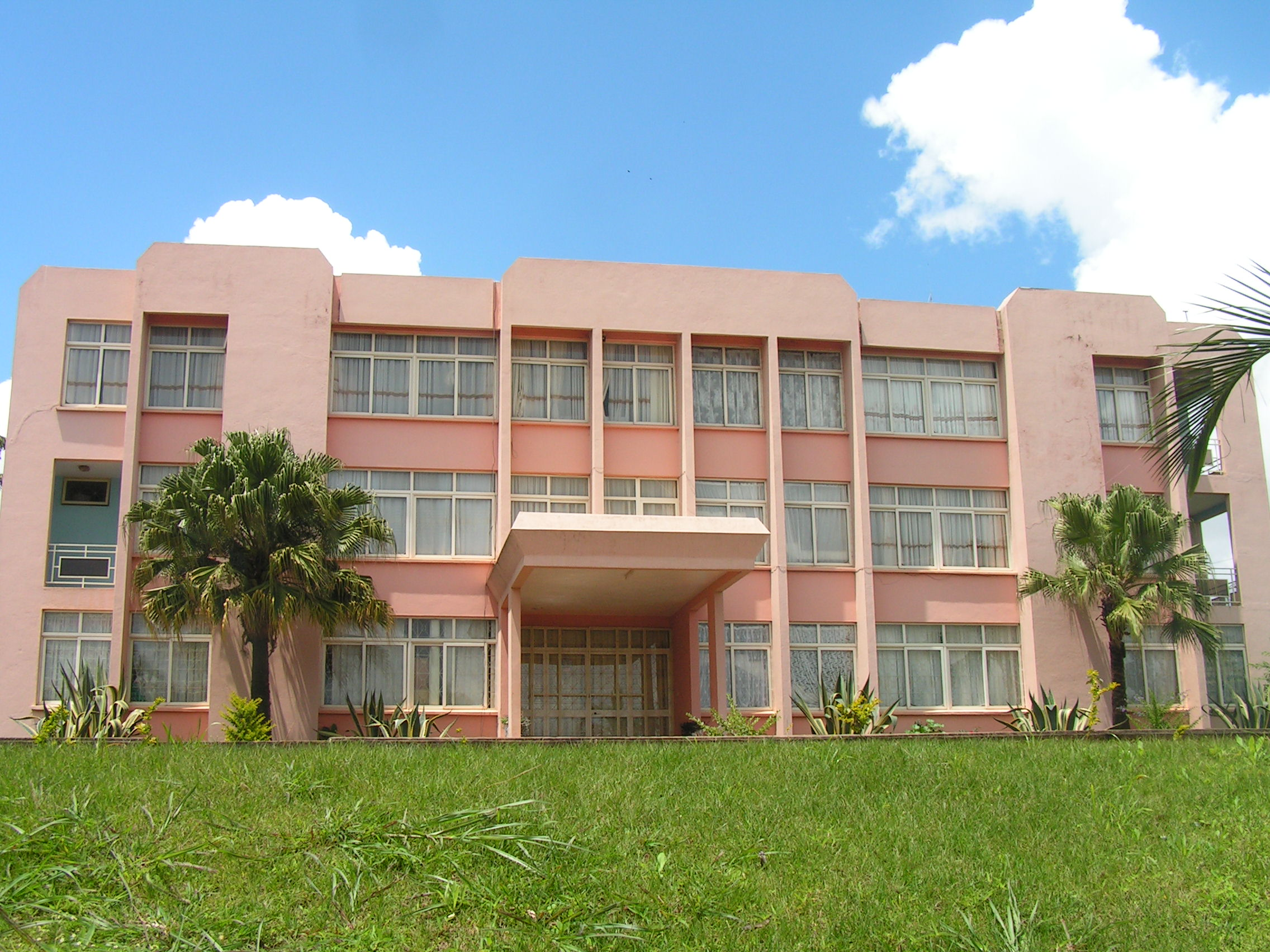
Bishop's House & Diocesan Secretariat

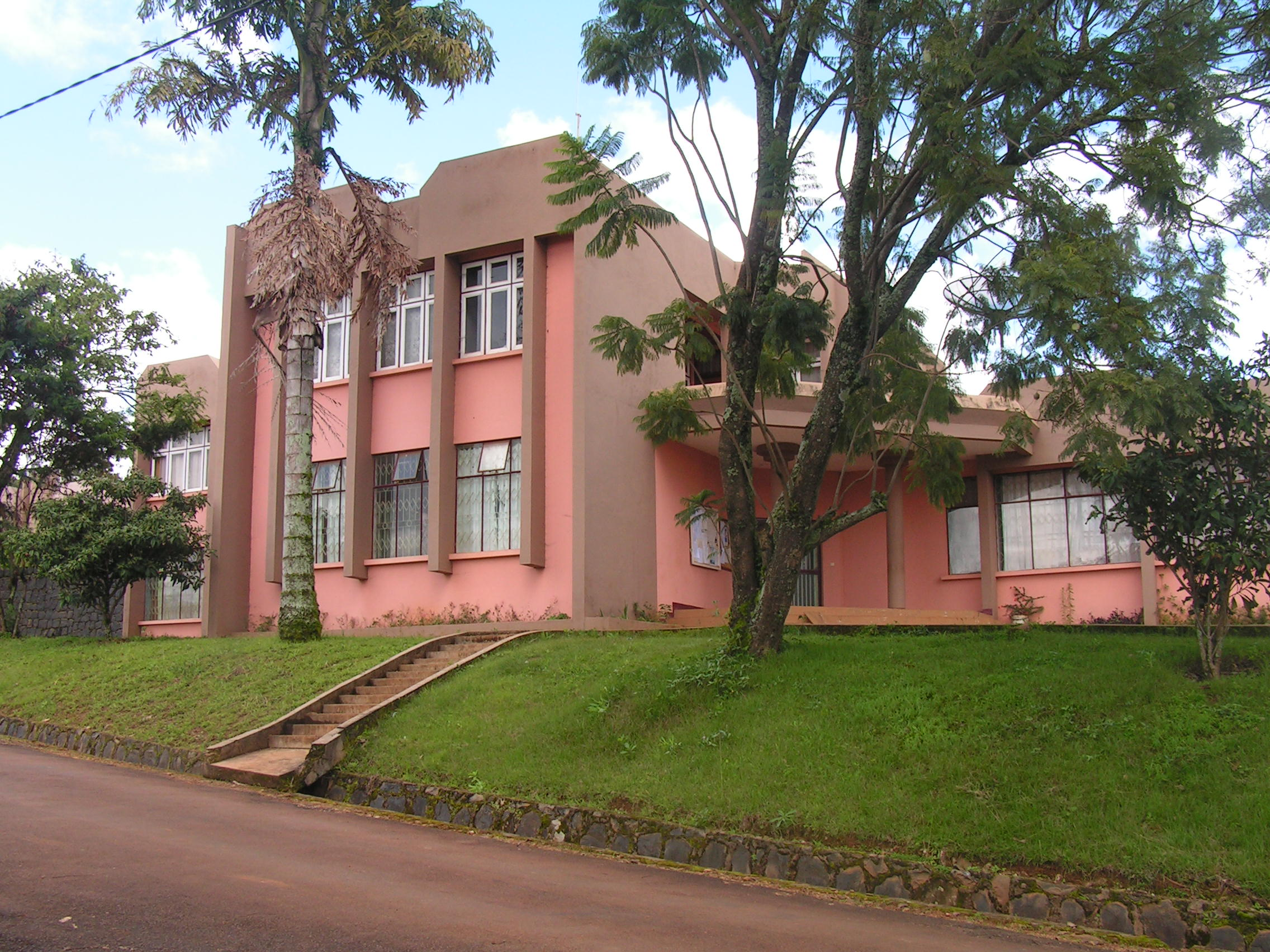
Catholic Education Secretariat

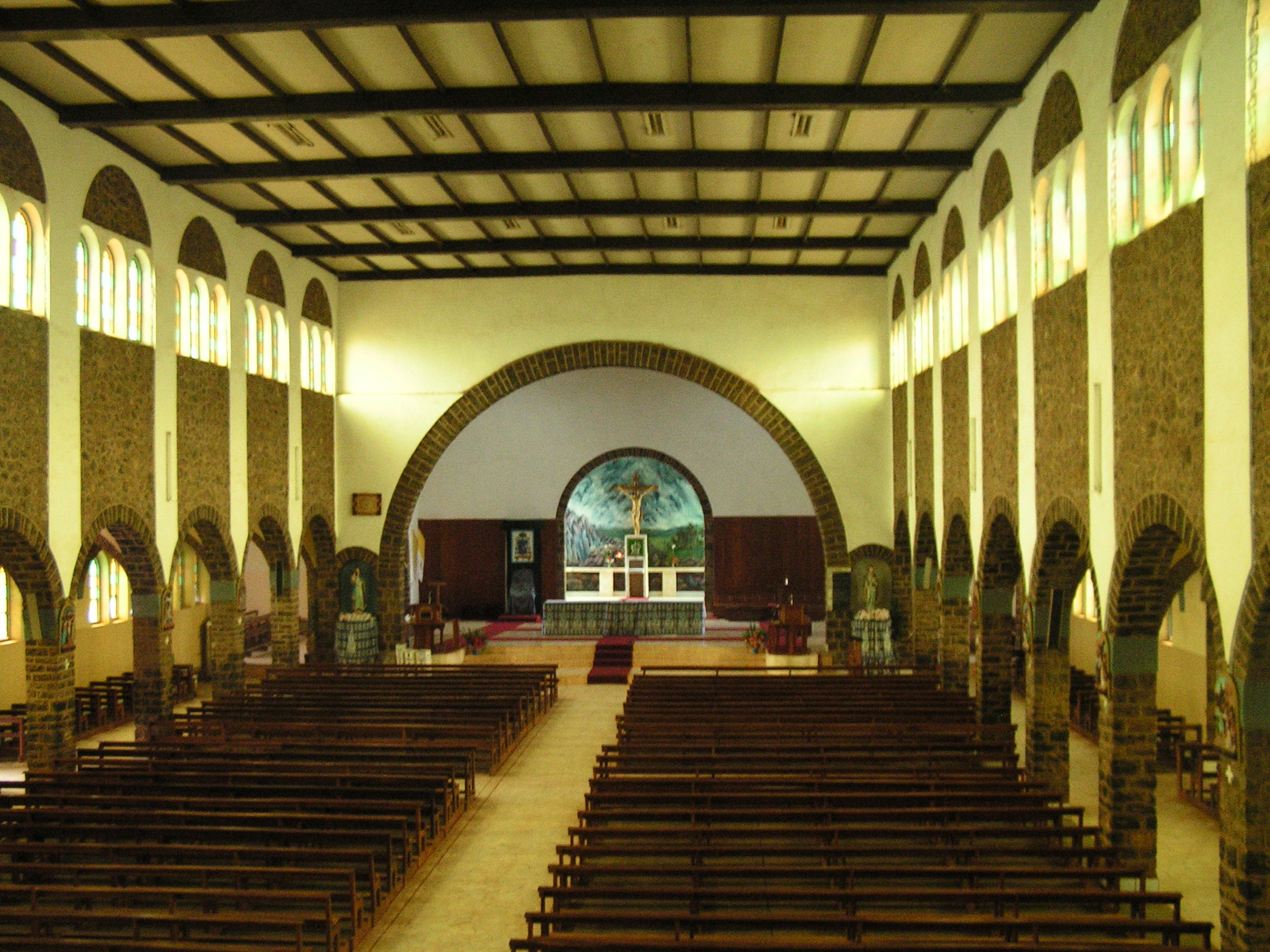
Central Nave and Ceiling of the Cathedral

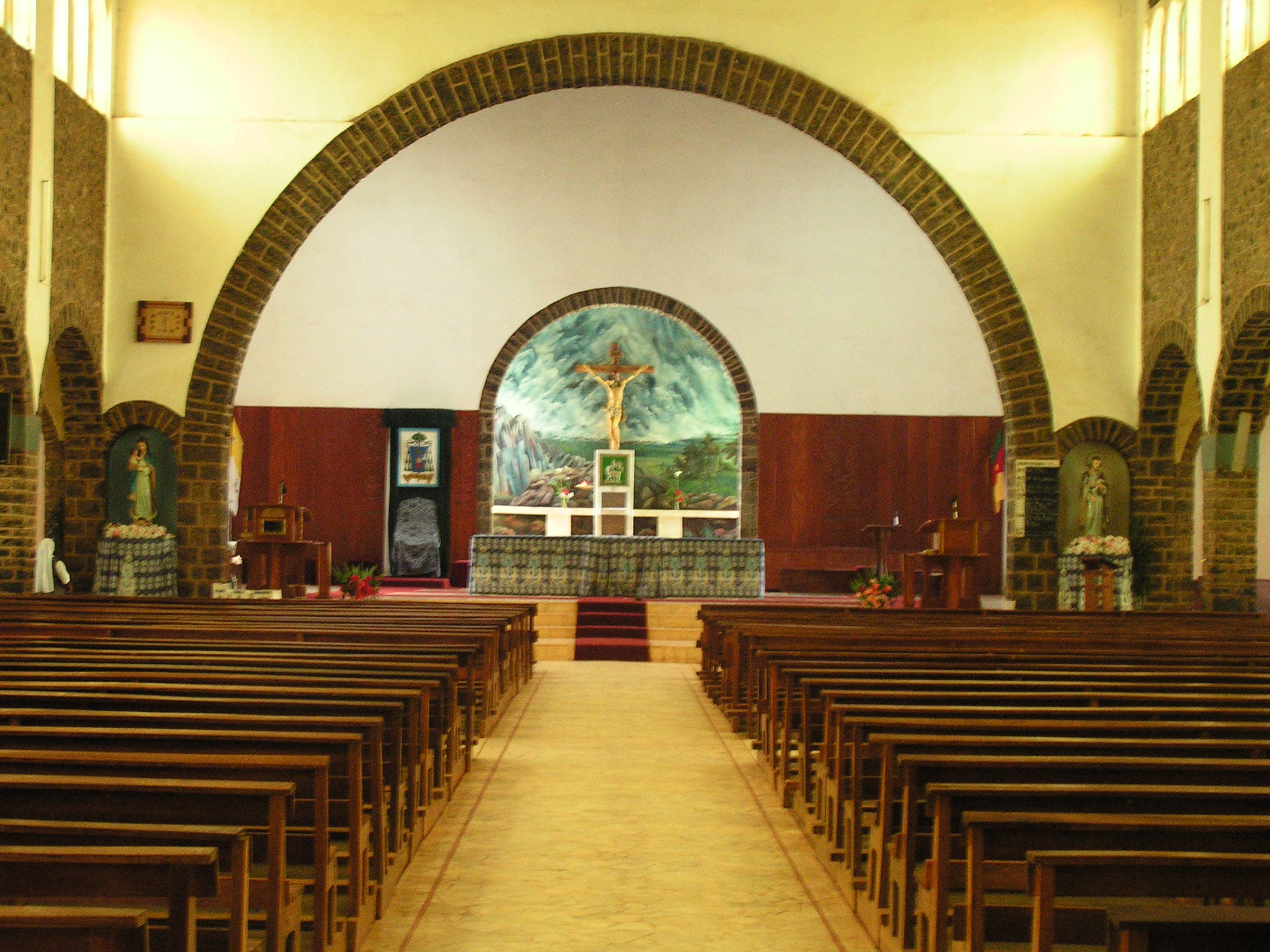
Main Nave and Long View of the Main Altar

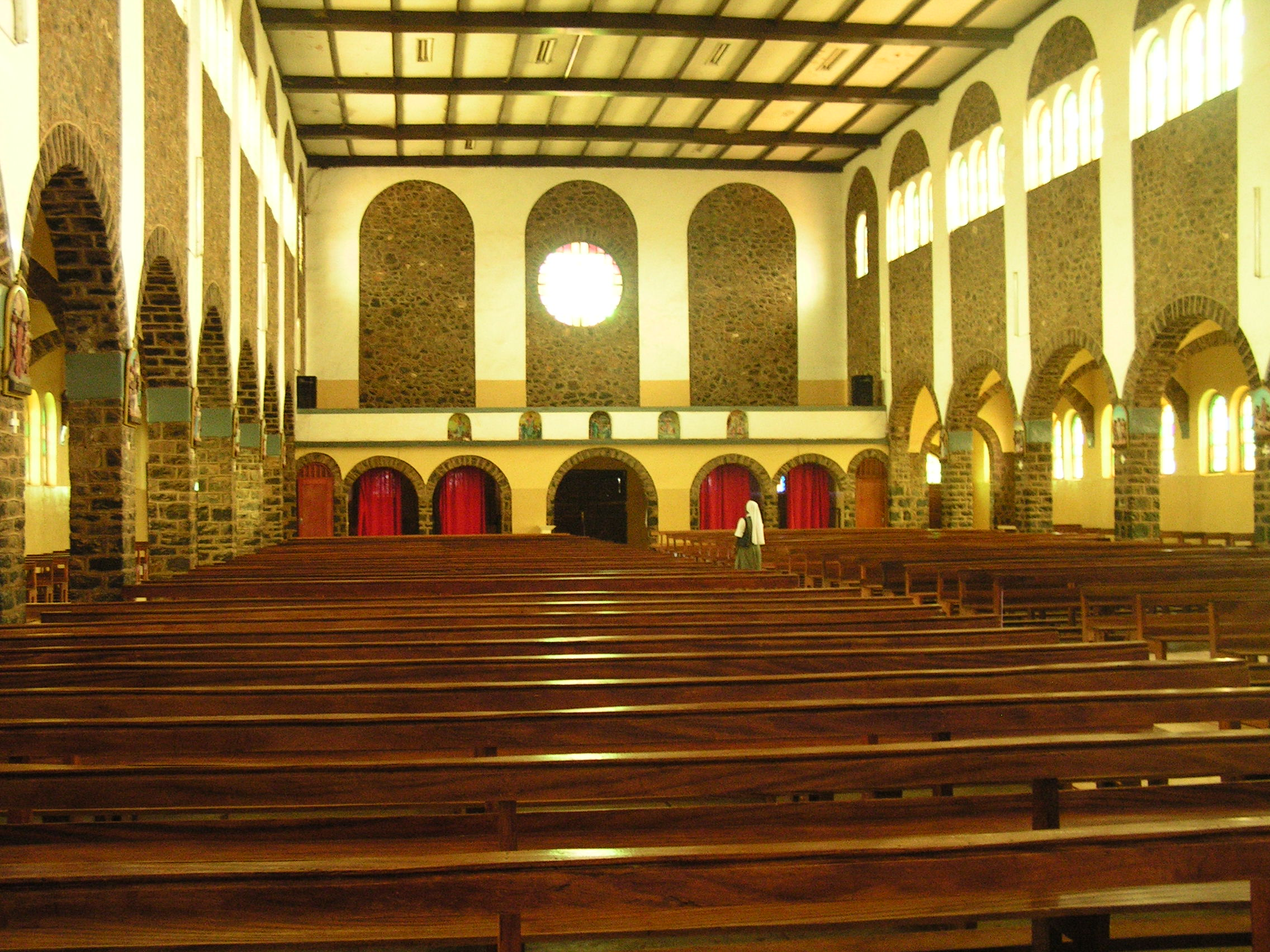
Rear View and Ceiling of the Cathedral

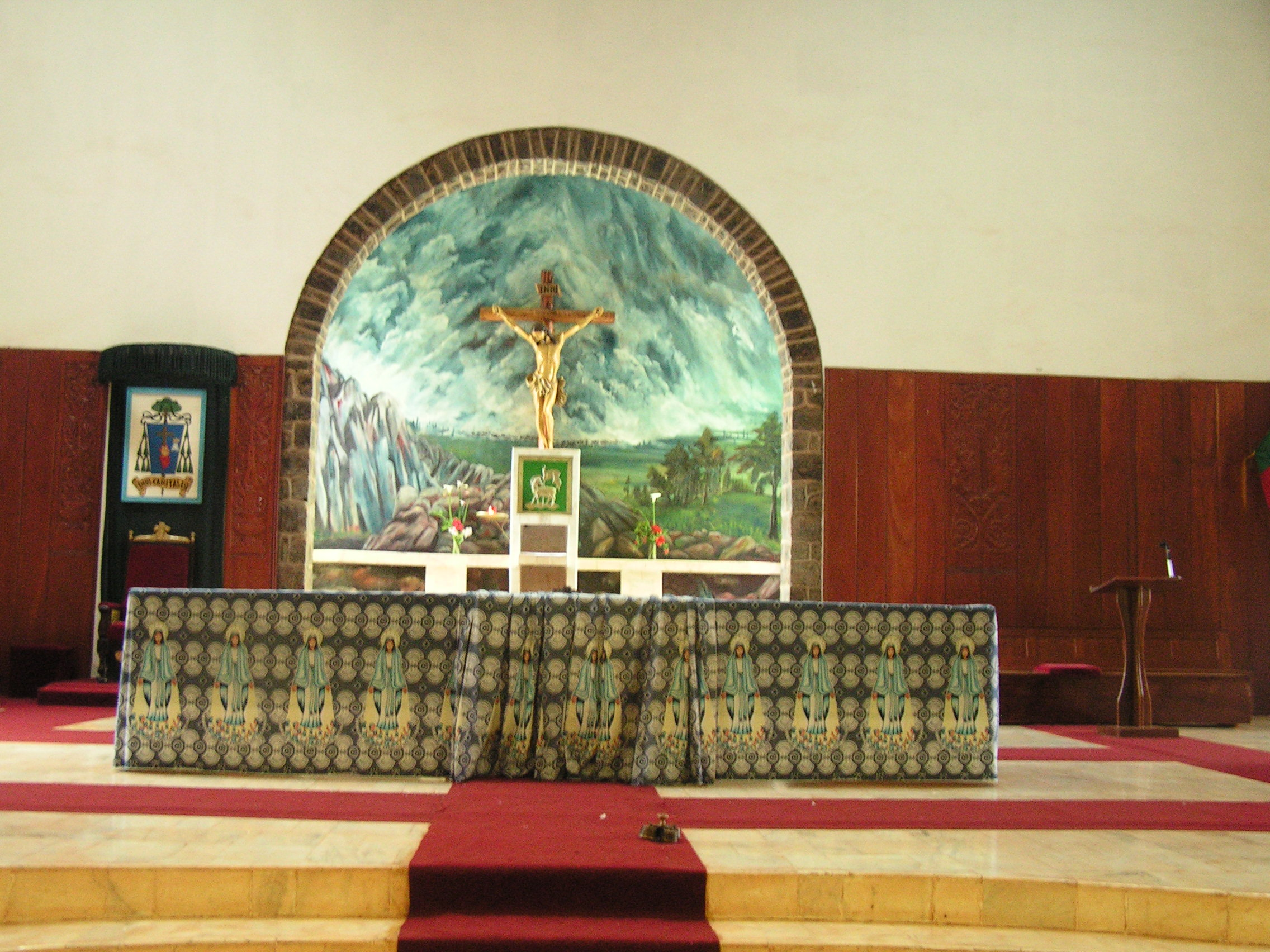
Closer Look of the Main Altar of the Cathedral

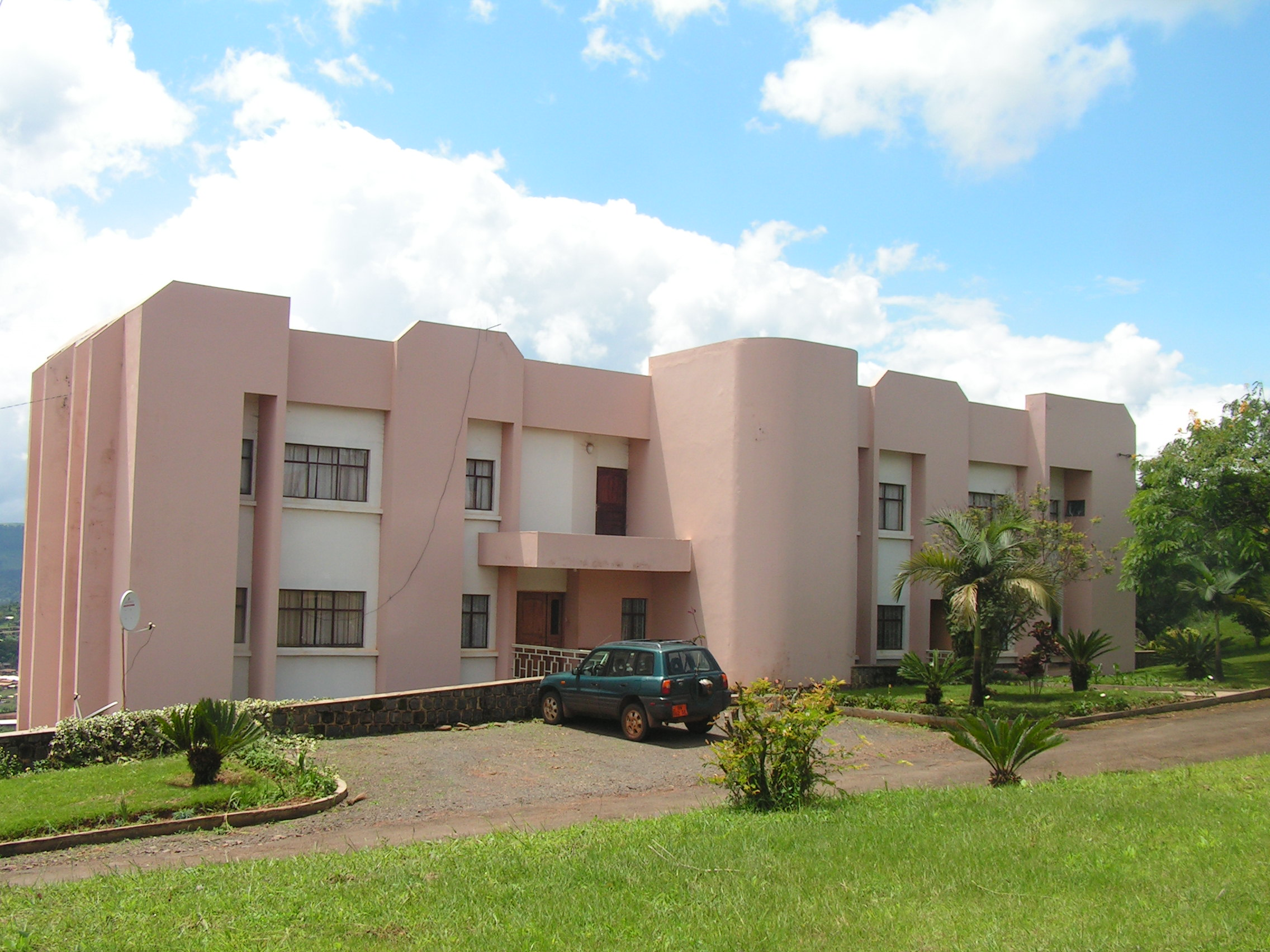
Sisters Convent on Bishop's Hill

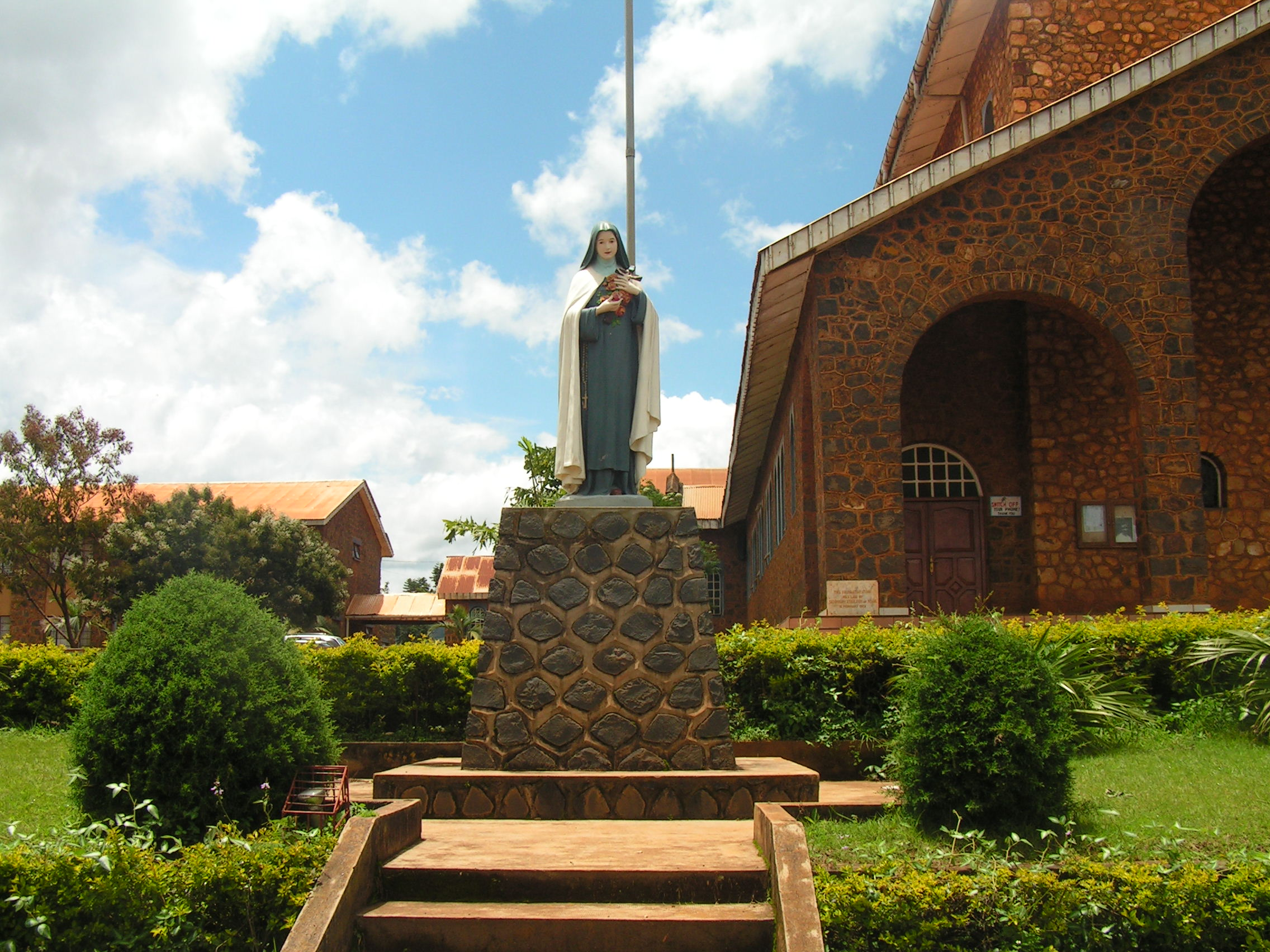
Statue of Saint Thérèse in front of the Cathedral

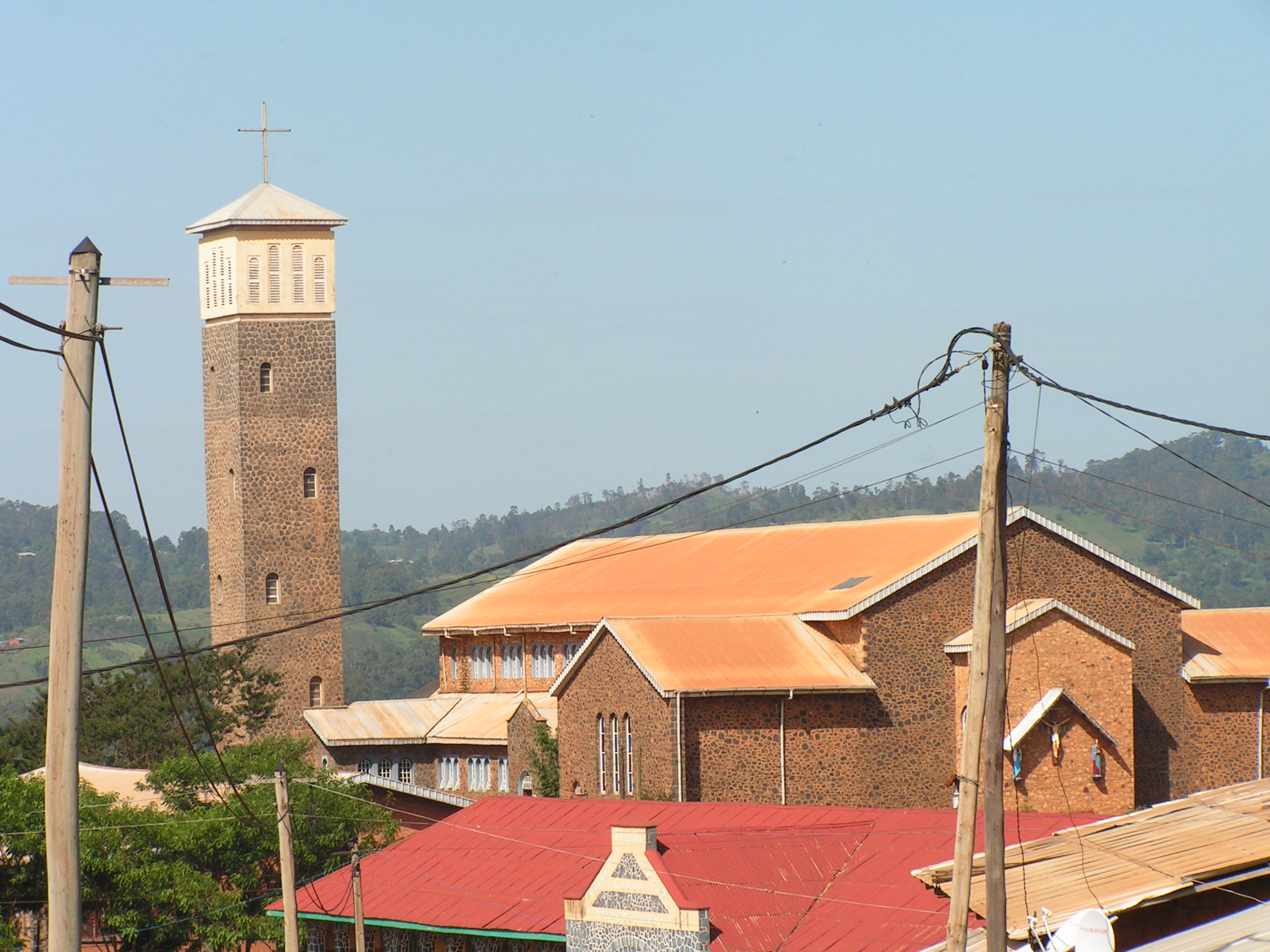
Bell Tower of the cathedral from Small Market Side

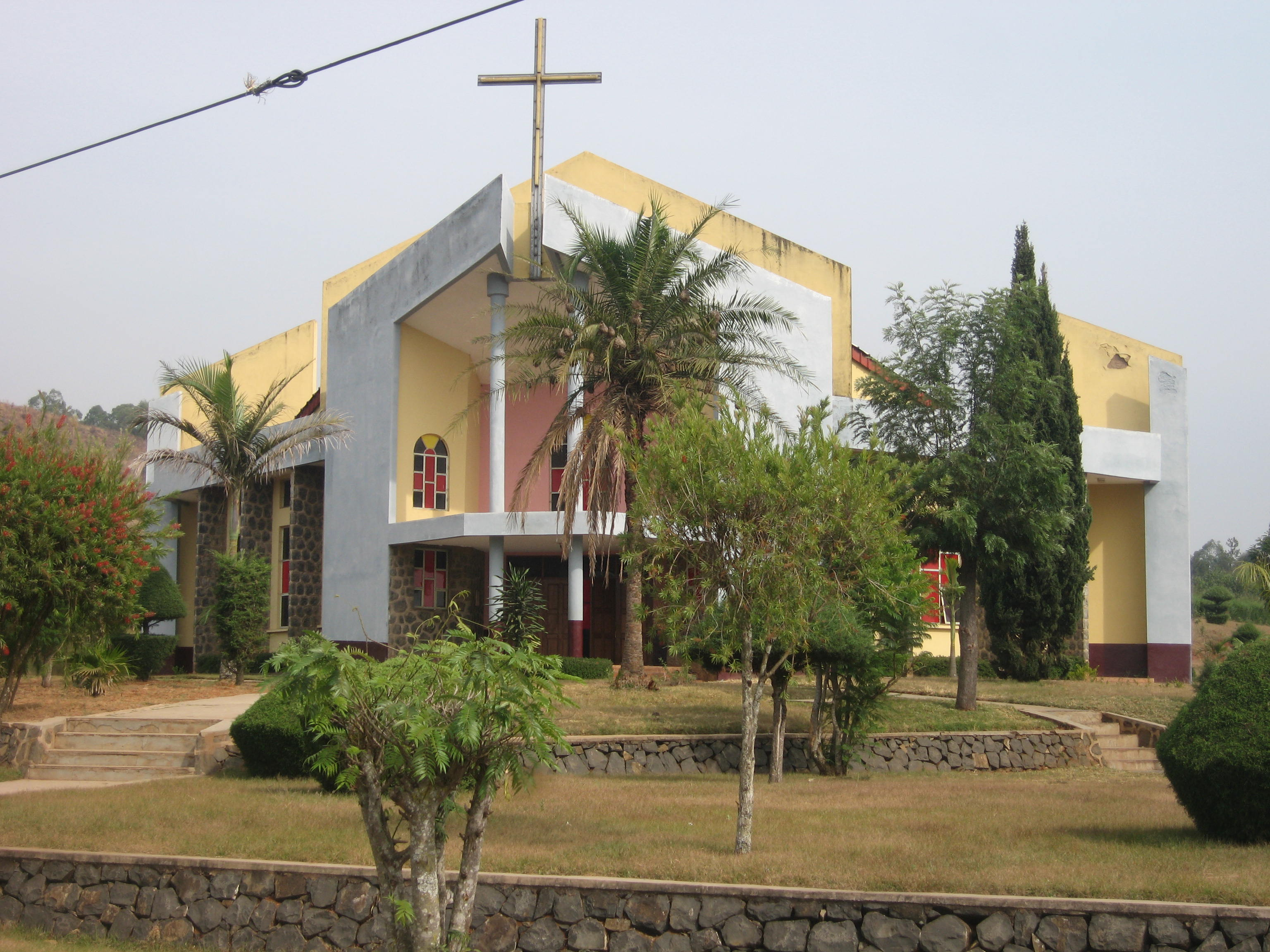
Chapel of Saint Aloysius Minor Seminary, Kitiwum

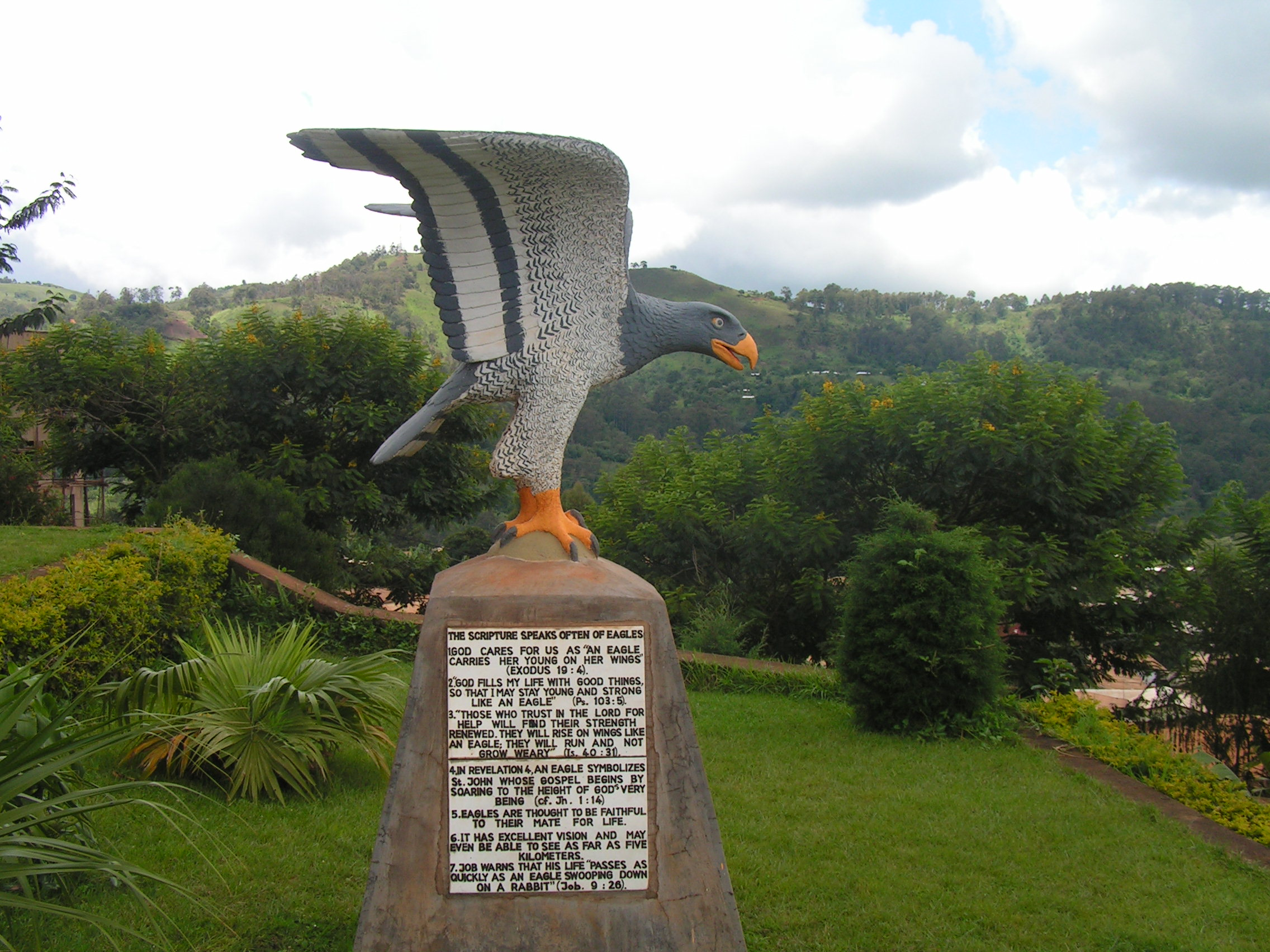
Statue of an Eagle in front of the Cathedral

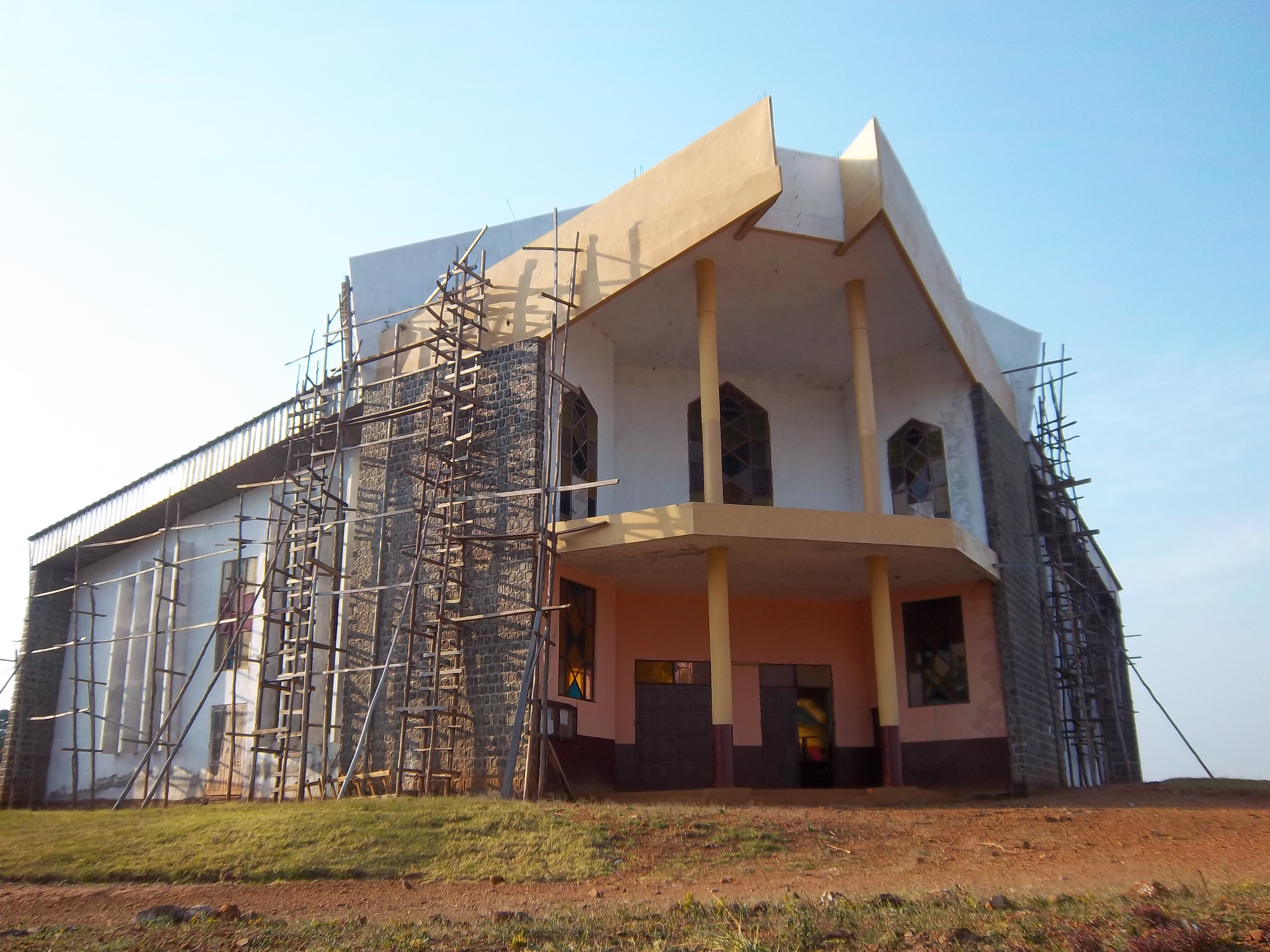
New Binju-Nkambe Parish Church.

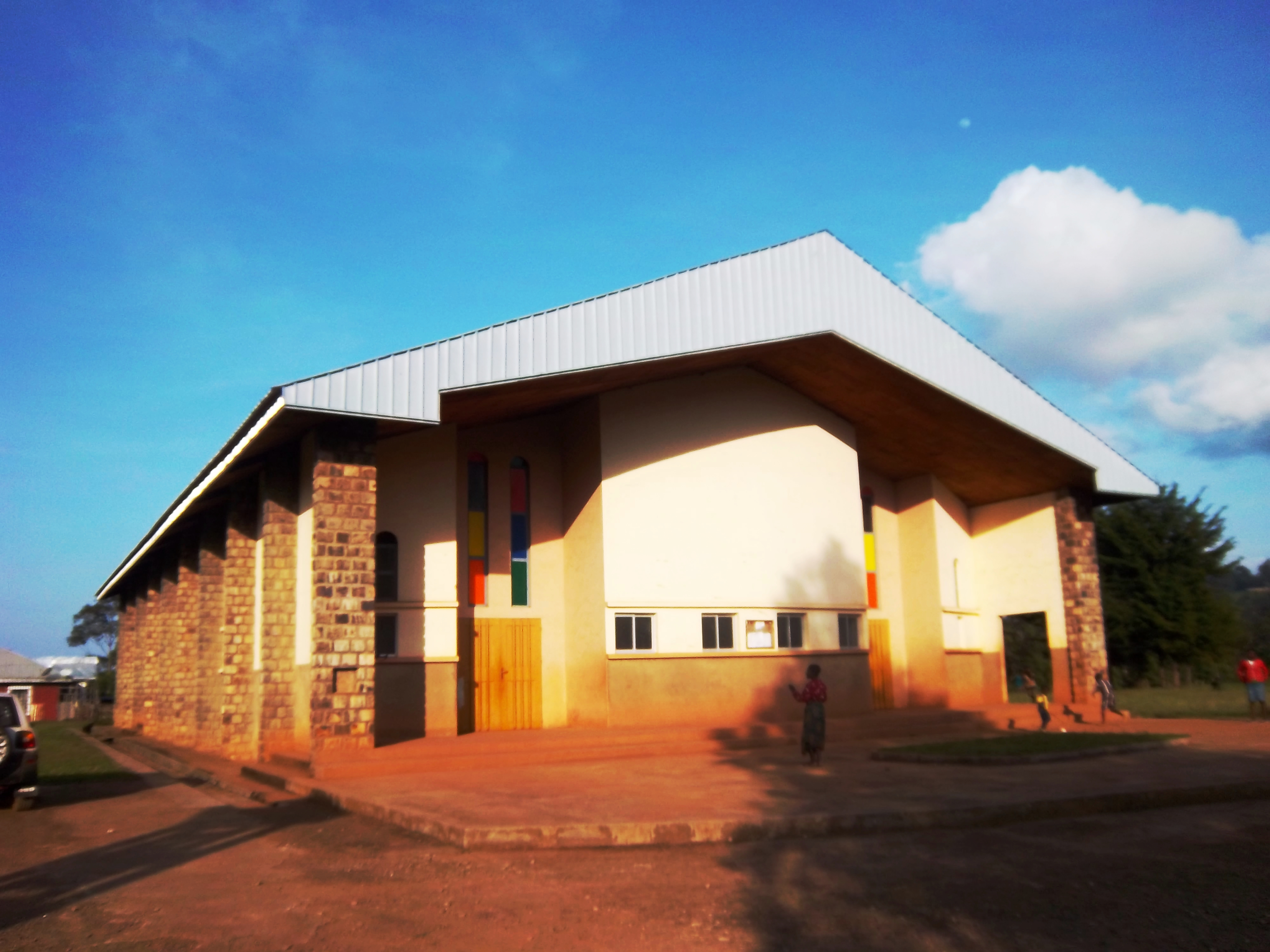
Saint John the Baptist Parish Church, Elak-Oku.

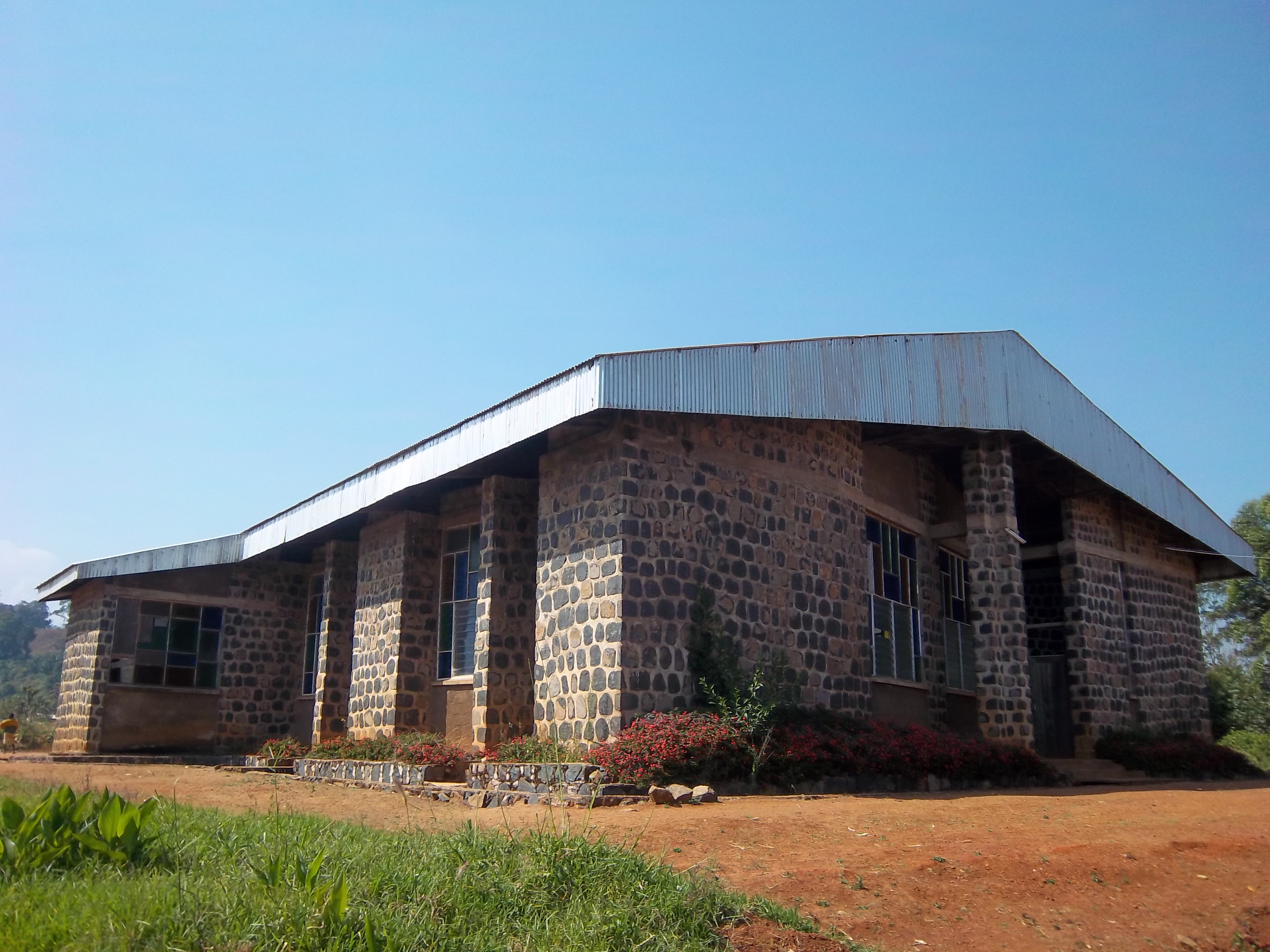
Saint Joseph Quasi - Parish Church, Ndzevru.

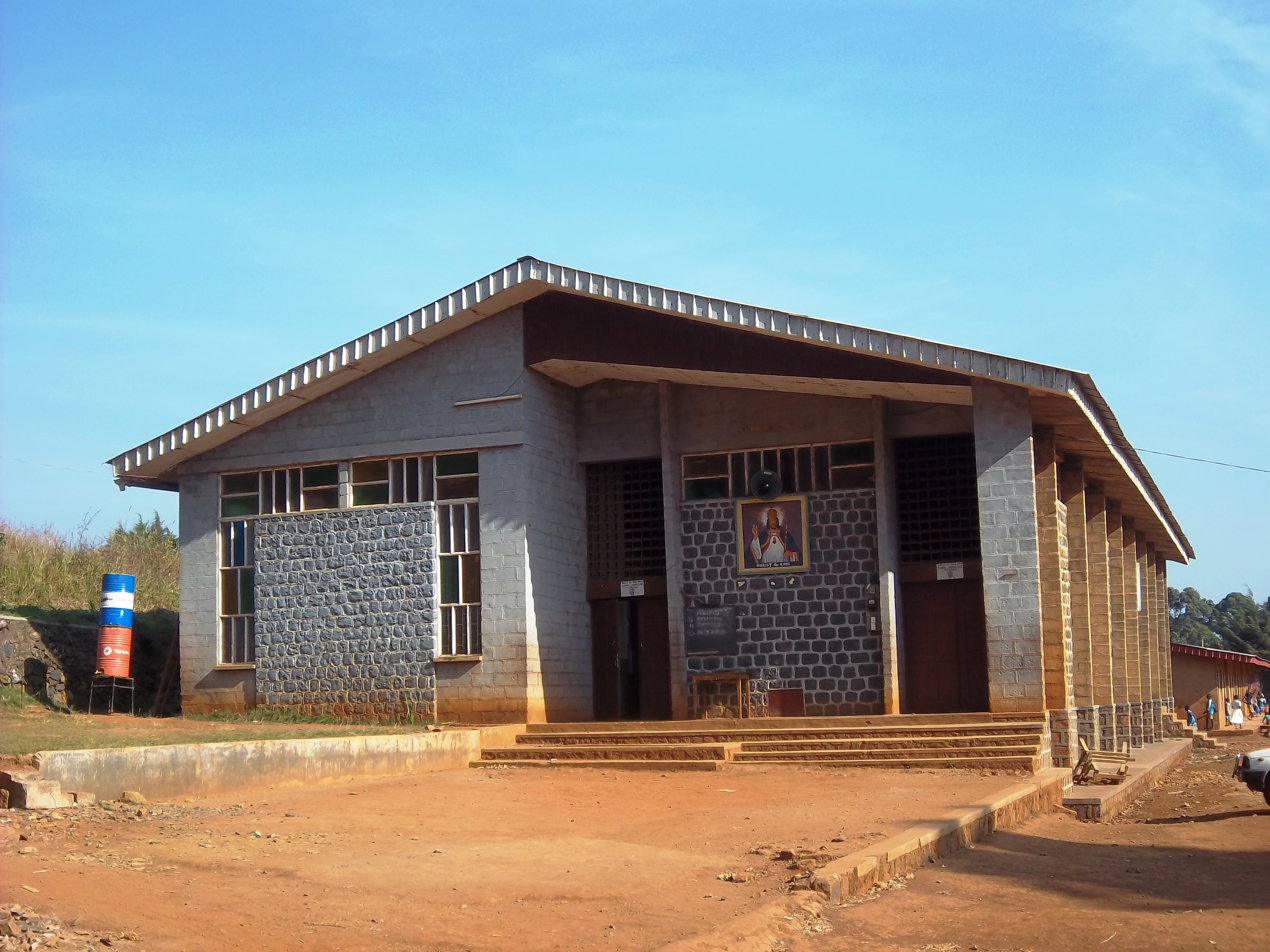
Christ the King Parish Church, Nkambe Town.

== See also ==
- Roman Catholicism in Cameroon
