= Francis Teke Lysinge =

Cameroonian Catholic prelate (1938–2026)

The Most Reverend Francis Teke Lysinge
- Bishop Emeritus of Mamfe
- Church: Catholic Church
- Archdiocese: Bamenda
- See: Mamfe
- Appointed: 9 February 1999
- Installed: 21 April 1999
- Term ended: 25 January 2014
- Predecessor: None (Diocese created)
- Successor: Andrew Nkea Fuanya

Orders
- Ordination: 17 April 1966 by Julius Joseph Willem Peeters
- Consecration: 12 April 1999 by Christian Wiyghan Tumi, Paul Mbiybe Verdzekov and Pius Suh Awa
- Rank: Bishop

Personal details
- Born: Francis Teke Lysinge; 28 December 1938 Muea, Southern Cameroons, British Cameroons
- Died: 29 July 2026 (aged 87) Mamfe, Cameroon
- Motto: "Fiat Voluntas Tua" (Thy Will be Done)

Styles of Francis Teke Lysinge
- Reference style: Your Lordship; The Most Reverend
- Spoken style: His Lordship
- Religious style: Bishop

Francis Teke Lysinge (28 December 1938 – 29 July 2026) was a Cameroonian Catholic prelate who served as the bishop of the Roman Catholic Diocese of Mamfe, in Cameroon from 9 February 1999 until his age-related retirement on 25 January 2014. Before that, from 17 April 1966 until 9 February 1999, he was a priest of the Catholic Diocese of Buea. Pope John Paul II appointed him bishop. He was consecrated at Mamfe on 21 April 1999 by Cardinal Christian Wiyghan Tumi, Archbishop of Douala. On 25 January 2014, Pope Francis accepted the age-related retirement of Bishop Francis Teke Lysinge, from the pastoral care of the Catholic Diocese of Mamfe. The bishop lived on as the Bishop Emeritus of Mamfe in Cameroon. He died om 29 July 2026 at Mamfe, Cameroon.

== Background and education ==
Francis Teke Lysinge was born on 28 December 1938 near Buea. His father, Francis Teke Lysinge was from Bokwango, but worked as a schoolteacher in Muea. His mother, Juliana JofiMbua, was from Buea. The future bishop grew up in Muea, "the second son in a family of four boys and three girls". His parents were both Protestants and he was initially baptized and given the Christian name "Godwill". He started primary school at the "Basel Mission Church School" at Bimbia-Victoria in 1945.

He attended St. Joseph's College, Sasse, (Sasse College) for his secondary school education, from 1953 until 1958 under the name Godwill Teke Lysinge. In 1955, while at Sasse, he converted to Catholicism and took on the name "Francis", after Saint Francis Xavier. He then entered the Bigard Memorial Seminary, in Enugu, Nigeria, where he studied both philosophy and theology, from 1960 until 1966. He held advanced qualifications in Spiritual Theology, awarded by an institution in Rome, Italy.

== Priest ==
On 17 April 1966, he was ordained priest for the Diocese of Buéa by Julius Joseph Willem Peeters, Bishop of Buéa. He served as a priest until 9 February 1999. While a priest, he served in various roles and locations including:

- Priest in Mamfe at that time in the Diocese of Buéa from 1966 until 1967.
- Parish priest in the Mankon area, Diocese of Buéa.
- Curate of the Sacred Heart Parish, Diocese of Buéa.
- Priest in the Akwaya area in the Buéa Catholic Diocese.
- Studies in Rome, Italy leading to the award of an advanced degree in spiritual theology.
- Spiritual director at Saint Thommas Aquinas Major Seminary at Bambui from 1975 until 1979 and from 1990 until 1999.

== Bishop ==
On 22 February 1999, Pope John Paul II created the Roman Catholic Diocese of Mamfe, by taking territory from the Diocese of Buea. The Holy Father appointed Reverend Father Monsignor Francis Teke Lysinge, previously a member of the clergy of Buea to be the pioneer bishop of the new Catholic See. He was consecrated bishop at Mamfe, on 21 April 1999 by Cardinal Christian Wiyghan Tumi, Archbishop of Douala assisted by Paul Mbiybe Verdzekov, Archbishop of Bamenda and Pius Suh Awa, Bishop of Buéa.

On 25 January 2014, after 14 years as bishop, Francis Teke Lysinge resigned from the pastoral care of the Catholic Diocese of Mamfe, Cameroon and Pope Francis accepted his request. He lived on as Bishop Emeritus of Mamfe, Cameroon.

== Death ==
Lysinge died on 29 July 2026, at the age of 87.

== See also ==
- Catholic Church in Cameroon

Catholic Church titles
Preceded by None (Diocese created)	Bishop of Mamfe; 1999–2014	Succeeded by Andrew Nkea Fuanya
