= Agapitus Enuyehnyoh Nfon =

Cameroonian Catholic prelate (born 1964)

The Most Reverend Agapitus Enuyehnyoh Nfon
- Bishop of Kumba, Cameroon
- Church: Catholic Church
- Archdiocese: Roman Catholic Archdiocese of Bamenda
- See: Roman Catholic Diocese of Kumba
- Appointed: 15 March 2016
- Installed: 15 March 2016
- Predecessor: None (Diocese created)
- Successor: Incumbent
- Other post: Auxiliary Bishop of Bamenda (8 April 2011 - 15 March 2016)

Orders
- Ordination: 22 March 1991
- Consecration: 19 March 2026 Expected by Piero Pioppo
- Rank: Bishop

Personal details
- Born: Agapitus Enuyehnyoh Nfon; 11 February 1964 (age 62) Shisong, Diocese of Kumbo, Northwest Region, Cameroon

Styles of Agapitus Enuyehnyoh Nfon
- Reference style: Your Lordship; The Most Reverend
- Spoken style: His Lordship
- Religious style: Bishop

Agapitus Enuyehnyoh Nfon (born 11 Feb 1964) is a Cameroonian Catholic prelate who serves as the bishop of the Roman Catholic Diocese of Kumba, in Cameroon since 15 March 2016. Before that, from 8 April 2011 until 15 March 2016, he was auxiliary bishop of the Archdiocese of Bamenda, Cameroon. Pope Benedict XVI appointed him bishop. He was consecrated by Piero Pioppo, Titular Archbishop of Torcello, on 31 May 2011. On 15 March 2016, Pope Francis created the Catholic Diocese of Kumba and made it a suffragan of the Metropolitan Province of Bamenda. The Holy Father appointed Bishop Agapitus Enuyehnyoh Nfon, previously auxiliary bishop at Bamenda to be the pioneer bishop of the new Catholic See.

== Background and education ==
Agapitus Enuyehnyoh Nfon was born on 11 February 1964, in Shisong, Diocese of Kumbo, Northwest Region, in Cameroon. He attended the Saint Thomas Aquinas Major Seminary in Bamenda, where he studied both philosophy and theology. From 1998 until 2001, he studied at the Augustinianum, an institute of the Pontifical Lateran University, in Rome, where he graduated with a licentiate in theology.

== Priest ==
He was ordained a priest for the Diocese of Kumbo, Archdiocese of Bamenda, on 22 March 1991. He served as a priest until 8 April 2011. While a priest, he served in various positions and locations, including:

- Assistant parish priest at Saint Theresa Quasi Parish, Sop, Cameroon from 1991 until 1992.
- Assistant parish priest at Saint Theresa Cathedral Parish, Kumbo, Cameroon from 1991 until 1992.
- School Administrator for the parishes of Kumbo and Meluf from 1991 until 1993.
- Chaplain and Professor at Saint Augustine's College, Kumbo from 1992 until 1993.
- Parish priest at Saint Pius X Parish, Tatum, Cameroon from 1993 until 1994.
- Secretary for the Bishops of Kumbo from 1994 until 1995.
- Secretary for diocesan finances, in Kumbo Diocese from 1995 until 1996.
- Director of Saint Augustine's College, Kumbo from 1996 until 1998.
- Diocesan Chaplain for the Association for Catholic Women from 1998 until 2001.
- Studies for a licentiate in Theology at the Augustinian Patristic Pontifical Institute, in Rome from 1998 until 2001.
- Formator at the Saint Thomas Aquinas Major Seminary at Bambui from 2001 until 2004.
- Treasurer of the Saint Thomas Aquinas Major Seminary at Bambui from 2004 until 2005.
- Rector of the same Seminary from 2005 until 2011.
- Member of the College of Advisors for the Diocese of Kumbo from 2007 until 2011.

== Bishop ==
On 8 April 2011, Pope Benedict XVI appointed Reverend Father Agapitus Enuyehnyoh Nfon, previously a member of the clergy of Kumbo, as auxiliary bishop of the Archdiocese of Bamenda. The Holy Father concurrently appointed him Titular Bishop of Unizibira. He was consecrated at Bamenda on 31 May 2011 by Piero Pioppo, Titular Archbishop of Torcello assisted by Cardinal Christian Wiyghan Tumi, Archbishop Emeritus of Douala and Cornelius Fontem Esua, Archbishop of Bamenda.

On 15 March 2016, Pope Francis created the Diocese of Kumba, a suffragan of the Metropolitan Province of Bamenda. The Holy Father transferred Bishhop Bishop Agapitus Enuyehnyoh Nfon, previously auxiliary bishop at Bamenda to the new Catholic See and appointed him local ordinary there. He was installed at Kumba on 7 May 2016. He continues to serve in that capacity in a precarious security environment.

== See also ==
- Catholic Church in Cameroon

== Succession table ==
Catholic Church titles
Preceded by None (Diocese created)	Bishop of Kumba (since 15 March 2016)	Succeeded by Incumbent
Preceded by	Auxiliary Bishop of Bamenda (8 April 2011 - 15 March 2016)	Succeeded by
