= List of Catholic dioceses in Cameroon =

The Roman Catholic Church in the Cameroon comprises 5 ecclesiastical provinces and 21 suffragan dioceses.

== List of dioceses ==
=== Ecclesiastical Conference of Cameroon ===
==== Ecclesiastical Province of Bamenda ====
- Archdiocese of Bamenda
  - Diocese of Buéa
  - Diocese of Kumba
  - Diocese of Kumbo
  - Diocese of Mamfe

==== Ecclesiastical Province of Bertoua ====
- Archdiocese of Bertoua
  - Diocese of Batouri
  - Diocese of Doumé–Abong’ Mbang
  - Diocese of Yokadouma

==== Ecclesiastical Province of Douala ====
- Archdiocese of Douala
  - Diocese of Bafang
  - Diocese of Bafoussam
  - Diocese of Edéa
  - Diocese of Eséka
  - Diocese of Nkongsamba

==== Ecclesiastical Province of Garoua ====
- Archdiocese of Garoua
  - Diocese of Maroua-Mokolo
  - Diocese of Ngaoundéré
  - Diocese of Yagoua

==== Ecclesiastical Province of Yaoundé ====
- Archdiocese of Yaoundé
  - Diocese of Bafia
  - Diocese of Ebolowa
  - Diocese of Kribi
  - Diocese of Mbalmayo
  - Diocese of Obala
  - Diocese of Sangmélima
