= George Nkuo =

Cameroonian Catholic prelate (born 1953)

The Most Reverend George Nkuo
- Bishop of Kumbo, Cameroon
- Church: Catholic Church
- Archdiocese: Catholic Archdiocese of Bamenda
- See: Diocese of Kumbo
- Appointed: 8 July 2006
- Installed: 8 September 2006
- Predecessor: Cornelius Fontem Esua (10 September 1982 - 7 December 2004)
- Successor: Incumbent

Orders
- Ordination: 26 Apr 1981 by Pius Suh Awa
- Consecration: 8 September 2006 by Cardinal Christian Wiyghan Tumi
- Rank: Bishop

Personal details
- Born: George Nkuo; 27 February 1953 (age 73) Njiniikom, Archdiocese of Bamenda, Northwest Region, Cameroon
- Motto: "Deus Caritas Est" (God Is Love)

Styles of George Nkuo
- Reference style: Your Lordship; The Most Reverend
- Spoken style: His Lordship
- Religious style: Archbishop

George Nkuo (born 27 February 1953) is a Cameroonian Catholic prelate who serves as Bishop of the Roman Catholic Diocese of Kumbo, in Cameroon since 8 July 2006. Before that, from 26 April 1981 until 8 July 2006, he served as a priest of the Diocese of Buéa, Cameroon. He was appointed bishop by Pope Benedict XVI. He was consecrated at Buéa on 8 September 2006 by Cardinal Christian Wiyghan Tumi, Archbishop of Douala.

== Background and education ==
George Nkuo was born on 27 February 1953 in Njiniikom, Archdiocese of Bamenda, Northwest Region, Cameroon. He studied both philosophy and theology at the Saint Thomas Aquinas Major Interdiocesan Seminary at Bamenda. From 1989 until 1991, he studied at the St Patrick's Pontifical University, Maynooth (Saint Patrick's College, Maynooth), in Dublin, Ireland. He graduated from there with a Licentiate in "Education Science".

== Priesthood ==
On 26 April 1981, he was ordained a priest for the Diocese of Buéa, Cameroon, by Pius Suh Awa, Bishop of Buéa. He served as a priest until 8 July 2006. While a priest, he served in various roles and locations, including:

- Assistant priest at Saint Joseph's Parish, Mamfe from 1981 until 1983.
- Scholastic director at Saint Jean's Parish, Kumba from 1983 until 1985.
- Secretary to the bishop of the Catholic Diocese of Buéa from 1985 until 1989.
- Studies in Dublin, Ireland at Saint Patrick's College Maynooth, where he graduated with a licentiate in education science from 1989 until 1991.
- Director of Saint Francis College at Fiango-Kumba from 1991 until 1994.
- Diocesan secretary for Catholic Education from 1994 until 2006.

== As bishop ==
On 8 July 2006, Pope Benedict XVI appointed Reverend Father George Nkuo, previously a member of the clergy of the Diocese of Buéa, Camerron as bishop of the Diocese of Kumbo, Cameroon. He was consecrated on 8 September 2006, by Cardinal Christian Wiyghan Tumi, Archbishop of Douala assisted by Cornelius Fontem Esua, Archbishop of Bamenda and Simon-Victor Tonyé Bakot, Archbishop of Yaoundé. He continues to serve in that capacity in the midst of a 10-year separatist insurgency.

== See also ==
- Catholic Church in Cameroon

== Succession table ==
Catholic Church titles
Preceded by Cornelius Fontem Esua (10 September 1982 - 7 December 2004)	Bishop of Kumbo (since 8 July 2006)	Succeeded by (Incumbent)
