= Unizibira =

Africa Proconsularis (125 AD)

Unizibira was an ancient town and bishopric in Roman North Africa which remains a Latin Catholic titular see.

== History ==
Unizibira is plausibly identified with modern Henchir-Zembra, now in the Sahel region of southern Tunisia. The main archaeological remains of the town are those of a Roman amphitheatre.

It was among many cities important enough in the Roman (later Byzantine) province of Byzacena, to become a suffragan diocese (Latin: dioecesis Unizibirensis or Unuzibirensis) of the Metropolitan of Carthage, in the papal sway.

There are three historically documented bishops of Unizibira :

- Donatist Maximinus attended the Council of Carthage (411), which saw gathered together the Catholic bishops and schismatic Donatists bishops of Roman Africa, whose heresy was condemned; there was no Catholic counterpart from Unizira.
- Ciprianus participated in the Council of Carthage (484) called by king Huneric of the Vandal Kingdom, after which he was exiled like most Catholic bishops. He is also mentioned by Victor of Vita in its history of persecution vandale. A Bishop Cyprian, remembered in the Roman Martyrology on the date of October 12, may be him.
- Donatus, who took part in the Council of 641 against the heresy Monothelitism.

The bishopric ceased to function in the seventh century at the advent of Islam.

== Titular see ==
The diocese was nominally restored in 1933 as a titular bishopric of Unizibira (Latin = Curiate Italian) / Unizibiren(sis) (Latin adjective).

It has had the following incumbents, so far of the fitting Episcopal (lowest) rank:

- Pius Bonaventura Dlamini, (14 December 1967 – death 13 September 1981) as Bishop of Mariannhill (South Africa) (1967.12.14 – 1981.09.13); previously Bishop of Umzimkulu (South Africa) (1954.02.21 – 1967.12.14)
- Rémy Victor Vancottem (15 February 1982 – 31 May 2010) as Auxiliary Bishop of Archdiocese of Mechelen–Brussel (Belgium) (1982.02.15 – 2010.05.31); later Bishop of Namur (Belgium) (2010.05.31 – ...)
- Agapitus Enuyehnyoh Nfon (8 April 2011 - 19 June 2017), as Auxiliary bishop of Archdiocese of Bamenda (Cameroon) (2011.04.08 – 2016.03.15); later (first) Bishop of Kumba (Cameroon) (2016.03.15 – ...)
- Bishop-elect Luis Enrique Rojas Ruiz (19 June 2017 – ...), as Auxiliary Bishop of Archdiocese of Mérida in Venezuela (Venezuela) (2017.06.19 – ...).

== See also ==
- List of Catholic dioceses in Tunisia

== Sources and external links ==
- Gcatholic.org site - (former &) titular see
- Catholic-hierarchy.org

Bibliography

- Pius Bonifacius Gams, Series Episcoporum Ecclesiae Catholicae, Leipzig 1931, p. 470.
- Stefano Antonio Morcelli, Africa Christiana, Volume I, Brescia 1816, p.359
