= 2023 Muea attack =

Militant attack in Cameroon

Muea attack
- Part of Anglophone crisis
- Location: Muea, South West Region, Cameroon
- Date: 7 September 2023; 7am
- Deaths: 4
- Perpetrators: Fako Mountain Lions; Ejona Black Tar
- Defender: Cameroon Armed Forces

On 7 September 2023, Ambazonian separatist militants attacked the town of Muea for disobeying "ghost town" orders imposed by the separatists, killing three people.

== Background ==
Muea has not historically been sympathetic to the Ambazonian separatist movement, and especially not the calls for ghost towns that demand economic activity come to a halt. However, since September 2022, Ambazonian separatists have increased their attacks on Muea and surrounding towns in Fako division. The week of 7 September was the first week that schools had reopened from summer break.

== Attack ==
Around 7am in Muea, several fighters arrived at a main road in Muea and began shooting at drivers in their cars. Young kids peddling water and other goods were shot at as well. Several vehicles were set on fire by the militants, and two people were burned alive in one vehicle. One Ambazonian fighter shouted "There is joy in heaven" during the attack. Four people were killed in the attack. The Cameroonian military began shooting at the attackers immediately after shots rang out, sparking a battle. After the attackers were subdued, the military rounded up several young boys in connection with the shooting.

The Bishop of the Diocese of Buéa condemned the attack. The Fako Mountain Lions and Ejona Black Tar claimed responsibility for the attack. The Fako Mountain Lions are loyal to Samuel Ikome Sako and led locally by Major General Sagat.
