= Steps Along the Way =

Steps Along the Way

Steps Along the Way is the spiritual autobiography of Diogenes Allen, professor emeritus at Princeton Theological Seminary.

In the book, Allen recounts his search for the providence of God. It includes reflections on the evolving role of faith in the world; an exploration of George Herbert's poetry; a reading of the message of love, duty, and forgiveness in the stories of Joseph and his brothers and the Prodigal Son; and a tracing of his own regrets and joys as a person of faith.

The book was published in 2002 by Church Publishing Incorporated. ISBN 0-89869-352-7
