= Diogenes Allen =

American philosopher and theologian

- Born: October 17, 1932
- Died: January 13, 2013 (aged 80); Newtown, Bucks County, Pennsylvania, U.S.
- Education: University of Kentucky (BA); Princeton University; St John's College, Oxford; Yale University (BDiv, MA, PhD)
- Known for: interpreter of Simone Weil and Søren Kierkegaard
- Awards: John Templeton Foundation Awards
- Scientific career
- Fields: Philosophy; Theology
- Institutions: Princeton Theological Seminary

Diogenes Allen (October 17, 1932 – January 13, 2013) was an American philosopher and theologian who served as the Stuart Professor of Philosophy at Princeton Theological Seminary. He was an ordained minister in the Presbyterian Church, which he served from 1958. He died in Newtown, Bucks County, Pennsylvania.

== Early life and education ==
Allen was born in Lexington, Kentucky, and graduated from the University of Kentucky in 1954. He then began graduate study at Princeton University, but, after being awarded a Rhodes Scholarship, matriculated to St John's College, Oxford, instead. There he studied philosophy and met his wife Jane, a fellow student.

After returning to America, Allen earned a Bachelor of Divinity at Yale Divinity School in 1959. He was called to a pastorate in Windham, New Hampshire, in 1958, and ordained in what is now the Presbyterian Church (USA) the following year. Shortly thereafter he enrolled at Yale University Graduate School to study for a PhD in philosophy, which was awarded in 1965.

== University career ==
Allen began his teaching career in 1964 at York University, Toronto. In 1967, Princeton Theological Seminary offered him the position of associate professor of philosophy, which, he accepted. In 1974, he was appointed to a full professorship there and in 1981 was named Stuart Professor of Philosophy. By the time of his retirement in 2002, he had served the faculty for thirty-five years and had become an authority on Gottfried Leibniz and an influential interpreter of Simone Weil and Søren Kierkegaard.

== Awards ==
Diogenes Allen's numerous awards include a Rockefeller Fellowship; a Canada Council Fellowship; research fellowships given by the Association of Theological Schools in the United States and Canada and the Center for Theological Inquiry; a Pew Evangelical Scholarship; and two John Templeton Foundation Awards for Best Courses in Science and Religion.

He is also the recipient of an Outstanding American Educator Award in 1974; a past member of the executive board of the Society of Christian Philosophers; a co-founder and member of the executive board of the American Weil Society; and a member of the board of directors of the Ecumenical Institute of Canada.

== Publications ==
- Leibniz' Theodicy (1966)
- The Reasonableness of Faith (1968)
- Finding Our Father (1974, republished as The Path of Perfect Love in 1992)
- Between Two Worlds (1977, republished as Temptation in 1986)
- Traces of God in a Frequently Hostile World (1981)
- Three Outsiders: Pascal, Kierkegaard and Simone Weil (1983)
- Mechanical Explanation and the Ultimate Origin of the Universe according to Leibniz (1983)
- Philosophy for Understanding Theology (1985)
- Love: Christian Romance, Marriage and Friendship (1987)
- Spirituality and Theology: Essays in Honor of Diogenes Allen, edited Eric Springsted (1988).
- Christian Belief in a Postmodern World: The Full Wealth of Conviction (1989)
- Quest: The Search for Meaning through Christ (1990)
- Primary Readings in Philosophy for Understanding Theology (1992), with co-editor Eric O. Springsted. ISBN 978-0-664-25208-3
- Nature, Spirit and Community: Issues in the Thought of Simone Weil (1994)
- Spiritual Theology: The Theology of Yesterday for Help Today (1997)
- Steps Along the Way: A Spiritual Autobiography (2002)
- Philosophy for Understanding Theology (2007), second edition, with 2 new chapters on Postmodern Christian theology by Eric O. Springsted. ISBN 978-0-664-23180-4
- Theology for a Troubled Believer: An Introduction to the Christian Faith (2010) ISBN 978-0-664-22322-9
- and over fifty journal articles.

== See also ==
- American philosophy
- List of American philosophers
