= Aloysius Fondong Abangalo =

South African Catholic prelate (born 1973

The Most Reverend Aloysius Fondong Abangalo
- Bishop of Mamfe, Cameroon
- Church: Catholic Church
- Archdiocese: Roman Catholic Archdiocese of Bamenda
- See: Diocese of Mamfe
- Appointed: 22 February 2022
- Installed: 5 May 2022
- Predecessor: Andrew Nkea Fuanya
- Successor: Incumbent

Orders
- Ordination: 20 April 2006 by Emmanuel Bushu
- Consecration: 5 May 2022 by Andrew Nkea Fuanya
- Rank: Bishop

Personal details
- Born: Aloysius Fondong Abangalo; 5 June 1973 (age 53) Limbé, Diocese of Buéa, Southwest Region, Cameroon

Styles of Aloysius Fondong Abangalo
- Reference style: Your Lordship; The Most Reverend
- Spoken style: His Lordship
- Religious style: Bishop

Aloysius Fondong Abangalo (born 5 June 1973) is a Cameroonian Catholic prelate who serves as the Bishop of the Roman Catholic Diocese of Mamfe, in Cameroon since 22 February 2022. Before that, from 20 April 2006 until 22 February 2022, he served as a priest of the Roman Catholic Diocese of Buéa, Cameroon. Pope Francis appointed him bishop. He was consecrated at Mamfe on 5 May 2022 by Andrew Nkea Fuanya, Archbishop of Bamenda.

== Background and education ==
He was born on 5 June 1973 in Limbé, Diocese of Buéa, Southwest Region, Cameroon. He attended the Saint Thomas Aquinas Interdiocesan Major Seminary in Bambui, Archdiocese of Bamenda, where he studied both philosophy and theology. He graduated with a Licentiate in Canon Law from the Université Catholique d'Afrique Centrale, in Yaoundé, where he studied from 2011 until 2014. He holds a Doctorate in canon law obtained from the Pontifical Urban University, in Rome, Italy, where he studied beginning in 2019.

== Priest ==
He was ordained a priest for the Diocese of Buéa on 20 April 2006 by Emmanuel Bushu, Bishop of Buéa. Aloysius Fondong Abangalo served as a priest until 22 February 2022. While a priest, he served in various roles and locations including:

- Vicar of the Holy Family Parish in Limbé from 2006 until 2007.
- Dean of Our Lady of Grace College in Muyuka from 2007 until 2009.
- Diocesan Treasurer and Member of the College of Consultors from 2009 until 2011.
- Studies in Yaounde, Cameroon, leading to the award of a licentiate in Canon Law from the Catholic University of Central Africa from 2011 until 2014.
- Lecturer and formator at the Saint Thomas Aquinas Major Seminary in Bambui from 2014 until 2019.
- Defender of the Bond at the Interdiocesan Tribunal of Bamenda from 2014 until 2019.
- Studies in Rome, Italy at the Pontifical Urban University, leading to the award of a doctorate in canon law since 2019.

== Bishop ==
On 22 February 2022, Pope Francis appointed Reverend Father Aloysius Fondong Abangalo, previously a member of the clergy of Buéa, as bishop of the Diocese of Mamfe, Cameroon. He was consecrated at Mamfe on 5 May 2022 by Andrew Nkea Fuanya, Archbishop of Bamenda assisted by Julio Murat, Titular Archbishop of Orange and Michael Miabesue Bibi, Bishop of Buéa.

== See also ==
- Catholic Church in Cameroon

== Succession table ==
Catholic Church titles
Preceded by Andrew Nkea Fuanya (25 January 2014 - 30 December 2019)	Bishop of Mamfe (since 22 February 2022)	Succeeded by Incumbent
