= Spiritual Theology =

Spiritual Theology: The Theology of Yesterday for Spiritual Help Today is a book written by Diogenes Allen, professor emeritus at Princeton Theological Seminary. The book largely discusses the ancient traditions included within the "threefold way" in achieving habitual presence with God. He begins by discussing what spiritual theology is before moving into the a description of its journey and goal. Along the way, he speaks of the importance of conversion, progress in that journey, and contemplation. The Eight Deadly Thoughts of Evagrius often prevent progress during the journey. Also included is a comparison and contrasting of the Book of Nature and the Book of Scripture. Finally, he ends the book by discussing mystical theology and Christian doctrine in the spiritual life.

The book was published by Cowley Publications in 1997. ISBN 1-56101-130-4
