= Tabenken =

Village in the Northwest Region, Cameroon

- Village
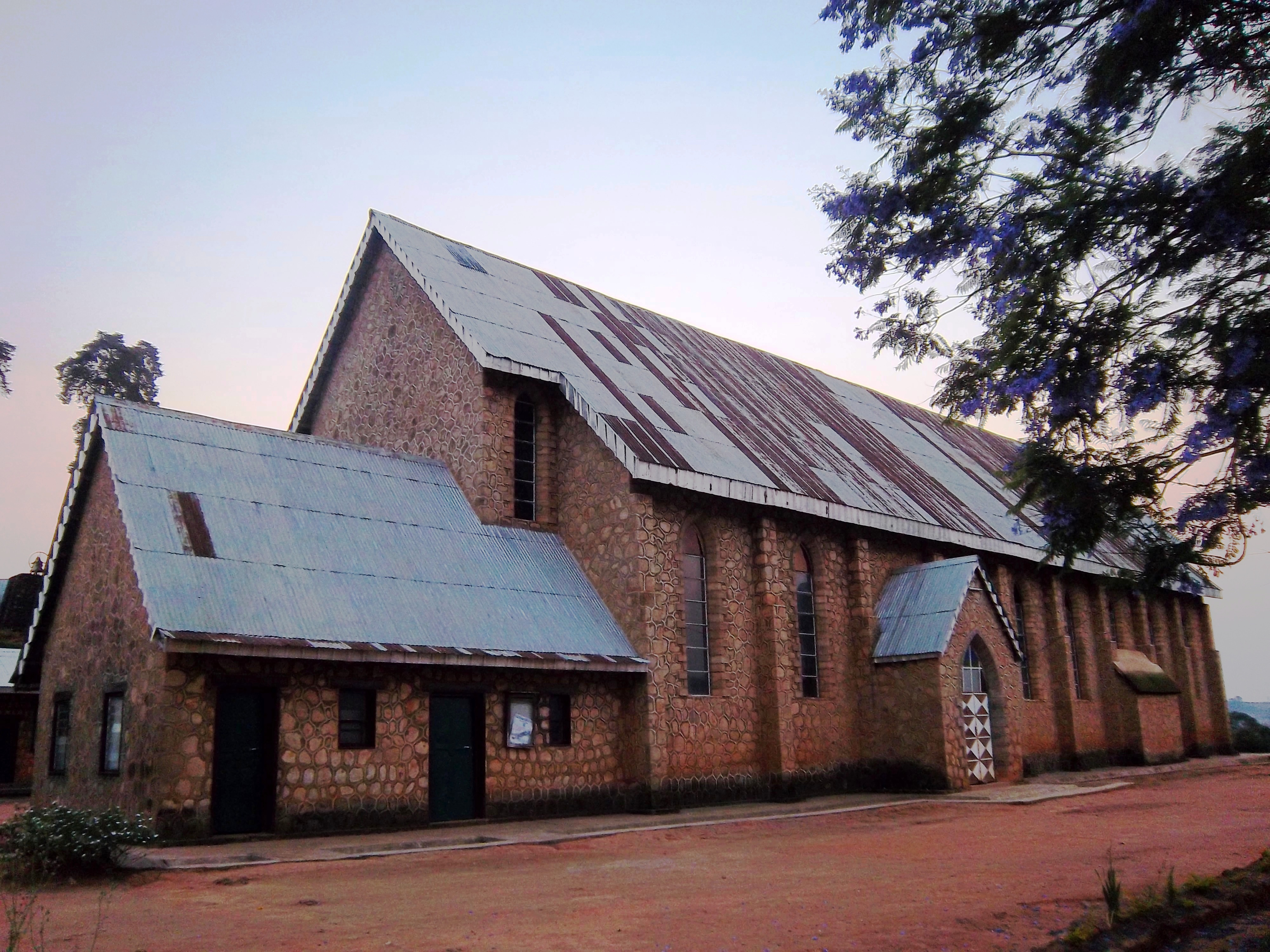
- A church in Tabenken.

- Location in Cameroon Tabenken (Africa)
- Coordinates: 6°30′N 10°47′E
- Country: Cameroon
- Region: Northwest Region
- Division: Donga-Mantung
- Commune: Nkambé

Population (2005)
  - Total: 6,401
- Time zone: UTC+1 (WAT)

Tabenken, also known as Tangmbo, is a village in Cameroon, located within the division of Donga-Mantung in the Northwest Region, near the border with Nigeria. It forms a part of the commune of Nkambé. In 2005, it had the population of 6,401 people.

== Demographics ==
In 1970, the village was inhabited by 5,951 people, most of whom where members of the Tang clan. In 2005, it had the population of 6,401 people.
