= Roman Catholic Diocese of Kumba =

Roman Catholic diocese in Cameroon

Coordinates: 4.6364°N 9.4333°E

Diocese of Kumba Dioecesis Kumbana Diocèse de Kumba

Location
- Country: Cameroon
- Territory: Meme, Ndian, Koupé-Manengouba
- Ecclesiastical province: Bamenda
- Metropolitan: Bamenda

Statistics
- Area: 4,415 sq mi (11,430 km^{2})
- Population: Total; Catholics: (as of 2016); 563,000; 206,000 (36.5%)
- Parishes: 16

Information
- Denomination: Roman Catholic
- Rite: Roman Rite
- Established: 15 March 2016
- Cathedral: Cathedral of the Sacred Heart
- Secular priests: 36

Current leadership
- Pope: Leo XIV
- Bishop: Agapitus Enuyehnyoh Nfon
- Metropolitan Archbishop: Andrew Nkea Fuanya

The Diocese of Kumba (Latin: Diocesis Kumbana; French: Diocèse de Kumba) is a diocese of the Roman Catholic Church in the African country of Cameroon. Headquartered in Kumba, the diocesan cathedral is the Cathedral of the Sacred Heart and its bishop is Agapitus Enuyehnyoh Nfon.

The diocese was created on 15 March 2016 by Pope Francis from territory in the Diocese of Buéa, and it is a suffragan diocese of the Archdiocese of Bamenda.

== History ==
On 15 March 2016, Pope Francis established the Diocese of Kumba with territory from the Diocese of Buéa, including the departments of Meme, Ndian, and parts of Koupé-Manengouba. The diocese's establishment was announced on 15 March 2016 at the Cathedral of Sacred Heart by the Apostolic Nuncio to Cameroon and Equatorial Guinea, Bishop Piero Pioppo. A letter from the Vatican was read which announced the creation of the diocese and the appointment of Agapitus Enuyehnyoh Nfon, auxiliary bishop of Bamenda, as its first bishop.

The new diocese covers 4,415 square miles (11,430 km^{2}.) and is home to 206,000 Catholics, who make up 36.5% of a total population of 563,000. It has 16 parishes served by 36 diocesan priests, five religious priests, and 44 religious sisters.

== Ordinaries ==
1. Agapitus Enuyehnyoh Nfon (since 15 March 2016)
