= Diocese of Mamfe =

Roman Catholic diocese in Cameroon

Mamfe Dioecesis Mamfensis

Location
- Country: Cameroon
- Ecclesiastical province: Bamenda
- Coordinates: 5.7552°N 9.3120°E

Statistics
- Population: Total: 439,000 (2023 est.)
- Parishes: 28

Information
- Rite: Roman (Latin)
- Established: 9 February 1999
- Diocese: Diocese of Mamfe
- Cathedral: St. Joseph's Cathedral, Mamfe
- Secular priests: 82

Current leadership
- Pope: Leo XIV
- Bishop: Aloysius Fondong Abangalo

Website
- dioceseofmamfe.net

The Roman Catholic Diocese of Mamfe (Latin: Mamfen(sis)) is a diocese located in the city of Mamfe in the ecclesiastical province of Bamenda in Cameroon.

== History ==
- 9 February 1999: Established as Diocese of Mamfe from Diocese of Buéa

== Special churches ==
The cathedral is St. Joseph's Cathedral in Mamfe.

== Bishops ==
- Bishops of Mamfe (Roman rite)
  - Bishop Francis Teke Lysinge (9 February 1999 – 25 January 2014)
  - Bishop Andrew Nkea Fuanya (25 January 2014 – 30 December 2019), appointed Archbishop of Bamenda
  - Bishop Aloysius Fondong Abangalo (since 22 February 2022)

=== Coadjutor bishop ===
- Andrew Nkea Fuanya (10 July 2013 - 25 January 2014) (see above)

== See also ==
- Roman Catholicism in Cameroon
