= Cornelius Fontem Esua =

21st-century Roman Catholic bishop

The Most Reverend Cornelius Fontem Esua
- Roman Catholic Archbishop of Bamenda
- Province: Bamenda Ecclesiastical Province
- Diocese: Roman Catholic Archdiocese of Bamenda
- See: Bamenda
- Appointed: December 7, 2004
- Installed: January 23, 2006
- Term ended: February 22, 2020
- Predecessor: Paul Mbiybe Verdzekov
- Successor: Andrew Fuanya Nkea
- Previous post: Bishop of Kumbo (1982–2004) Administrator of Kumbo (2006–2006)

Orders
- Ordination: December 29, 1971 by Pius Suh Awa
- Consecration: December 8, 1982 by Donato Squicciarini
- Rank: Archbishop

Personal details
- Born: July 2, 1943 Mbetta, Lebialem, South West Region, Cameroon
- Denomination: Roman Catholic
- Residence: Mankon-Bamenda
- Parents: Michael Esua and Felicitas Nsunya
- Motto: Sermo Tuus Veritas Est (Your Word is Truth)

Styles of Cornelius Fontem Esua
- Reference style: The Most Reverend
- Spoken style: Your Grace
- Religious style: Monsignor

Cornelius Fontem Esua is a Cameroonian Prelate of the Roman Catholic Church. He served as Archbishop of the Bamenda Metropolitan See since 2006 and retired in 2020.

== Life ==
Born in Mbetta, Esua was ordained to the priesthood on December 29, 1971.

On September 10, 1982, Esua was appointed bishop of Kumbo. Esua received his episcopal consecration on the following December 8 from archbishop Donato Squicciarini, the then apostolic nuncio to Cameroon, with the then recently appointed archbishop of Bamenda, Paul Mbiybe Verdzekov, and the bishop of Buéa, Pius Suh Awa, serving as co-consecrators.

Esua was named coadjutor archbishop of Bamenda by Pope John Paul II on December 7, 2004; he succeeded Paul Mbiybe Verdzekov as archbishop of Bamenda on January 23, 2006.

In June of 2019 Esua was kidnapped and later freed by separatist fighters in Belo.

== Views ==
Esua expressed his full intentions as Chief Pastor to advocate doctrinal views on issues like the Nkuv Affair. A number of the prominent members of the World Apostolate of Fatima (The Blue Army) became ringleaders of the unorthodox Nkuv devotion, since the latter was in some manner associated with the Fatima apparitions. It was on account of this association that the 13th of every month, and most especially the 13th of May, was taken as the official day of prayer for the Nkuvites. Since October 7, 1997, when Esua, then Bishop of Kumbo, issued a pastoral letter declaring the unorthodoxy of the Nkuv Affair and outlining the criteria for determining the authenticity of Marian apparitions, some of its adherents have withdrawn and regained full communion, some adhere both to Nkuv and to the church, and some have publicly excluded themselves from the church and pledged allegiance to Nkuv.

Esua and the other bishops of the Bamenda Ecclesiastical Province (BAPEC), issued a letter to all of the Christians concerning the sacrament of marriage and HIV/AIDS. All the bishops requested that before the publication of marriage banns, couples must present to the parish priest a valid and authentic medical certificate showing that they have done HIV/AIDS screening.

== See also ==
- List of Roman Catholic dioceses in Cameroon

Catholic Church titles
Preceded by Paul Mbiybe Verdzekov	Archbishop of Bamenda; 2006–present	Incumbent
