= Tatum, Cameroon =

Tatum
- Interactive map of Tatum
- Country: Cameroon
- Province: Northwest Province

Tatum is a town in Northwest Province, Cameroon. It had 5025 people at the 2006 census.

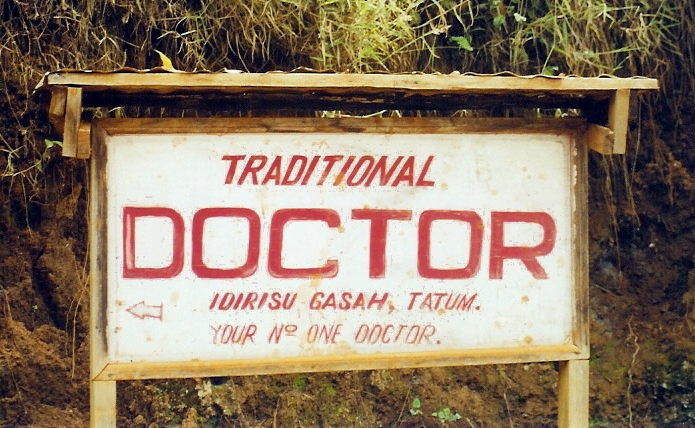
Sign advertising a traditional doctor in Tatum.
