= Andrew Nkea Fuanya =

Cameroonian Catholic prelate (born 1965)

The Most Reverend Andrew Nkea Fuanya
- Archbishop of Bamenda, Cameroon
- Church: Catholic Church
- Archdiocese: Catholic Archdiocese of Bamenda
- See: Bamenda
- Appointed: 30 December 2019
- Installed: 22 February 2020
- Predecessor: Cornelius Fontem Esua (23 January 2006 - 30 December 2019)
- Successor: Bishop of Mamfe, Cameroon (25 January 2014 - 30 December 2019); Coadjutor Bishop of Mamfe (10 July 2013 - 25 January 2014)

Orders
- Ordination: 22 April 1992 by Pius Suh Awa
- Consecration: 23 August 2013 by Piero Pioppo
- Rank: Archbishop

Personal details
- Born: Andrew Nkea Fuanya; 29 August 1965 (age 61) Widikum, Diocese of Buéa, Southwest Region, Cameroon
- Motto: "In spiritu et veritate" (In spirit and truth)

Styles of Andrew Nkea Fuanya
- Reference style: Your Lordship; The Most Reverend
- Spoken style: His Lordship
- Religious style: Archbishop

Andrew Nkea Fuanya (born 29 August 1965) is a Cameroonian Catholic prelate who serves as Archbishop of the Roman Catholic Archdiocese of Bamenda, in Cameroon since 30 December 2019. Before that, from 25 January 2014 until 30 December 2019, he served as bishop of the Diocese of Mamfe, Cameroon. Prior to that, from 10 July 2013 until 25 January 2014, he was Coadjutor Bishop of the Mamfe Catholic Diocese. He was appointed bishop by Pope Francis. He was consecrated at Mamfe on 23 August 2013 by Piero Pioppo, Titular Archbishop of Torcello. He succeeded at Mamfe on 25 January 2014. On 30 December 2019, The Holy Father elevated him to Archbishop and appointed him as the archbishop of the Ecclesiastical Metropolitan Province of Bamenda. He was installed at Bamenda on 22 February 2020. From 30 December 2019 until 5 May 2022, he concurrently served as apostolic administrator of the Catholic Diocese of Mamfe, Cameroon.

== Background and education ==
He was born on 29 August 1965 in Widikum, Diocese of Buéa, Northwest Region, Cameroon. He attended Christ the King Primary School at Tiko. He attended "Bishop Rogan Minor Seminary" in Buéa, for his secondary school education. He studied philosophy and theology at the "Saint Thomas Aquinas Major Seminary" in Bamenda. His Doctorate in canon law was awarded by the Pontifical Urban University in Rome, Italy.

== Priesthood ==
On 22 April 1992, he was ordained a priest for the Diocese of Buéa. He served as a priest until 10 July 2013. While a priest, he served in various roles and locations, including:

- Parochial vicar of the parish of Saint John Bosco in Bonge from 1992 until 1993.
- Parish priest of Saint Luke Parish in Nyandong from 1993 until 1995.
- Secretary/Chancellor of the Diocese of Buéa from 1995 until 1999.
- Studies at the Pontifical Urban University in Rome, Italy, leading to the award of a doctorate in canon law from 1999 until 2003.
- Secretary/Chancellor of the Buéa Catholic Diocese from 2003 until 2007.
- Professor and formator at the "Saint Thomas Aquinas Major Seminary" in Bamenda from 2007 until 2010.
- Member of the commission for the doctrine of the Cameroon National Catholic Bishops' Conference.
- Judicial vicar of the ecclesiastical tribunal of the Ecclesiastical Province of Bamenda.
- Secretary General of the Episcopal Conference of the ecclesiastical province of Bamenda.
- President of the Cameroonian National Association of Canon Law.
- Secretary general of the Catholic University of Cameroon in Bamenda.

== As bishop ==
On 10 July 2013, Pope Francis appointed Reverend Father Andrew Nkea Fuanya, previously a member of the clergy of the Diocese of Buéa, to be Coadjutor Bishop of the Diocese of Mamfe in the Ecclesiastical Metropolitan Province of Bamenda. He was consecrated on 23 August 2013 at Mamfe by Piero Pioppo, Titular Archbishop of Torcello assisted by Francis Teke Lysinge, Bishop of Mamfe and Emmanuel Bushu, Bishop of Buéa.

On 25 January 2014, Bishop Francis Teke Lysinge, having reached the retirement age for Catholic bishops, retired from the pastoral care of the Catholic Diocese of Mamfe and Bishop Andrew Nkea Fuanya succeeded him as the local ordinary there. On 30 December 2019 Pope Francis promoted him to Archbishop of Bamenda. He was installed at Bamenda on 22 February 2020. While archbishop, he concurrently served as apostolic administrator of Mamfe Diocese from 30 December 2019 until 5 May 2022.

In September 2026 the bishop told Aid to the Church in Need that he is preparing a catechism with questions and answers on the issue of conflict and peace, to contribute to peacebuilding in a region affected by the Anglophone crisis.

== See also ==
- Catholic Church in Cameroon

== Succession table ==
Catholic Church titles
Preceded by	Coadjutor Bishop of Mamfe (10 July 2013 - 25 January 2014)	Succeeded by
Preceded by Francis Teke Lysinge (9 February 1999 - 25 January 2014)	Bishop of Mamfe (25 January 2014 - 30 December 2019)	Succeeded by Aloysius Fondong Abangalo (since 22 February 2022)
Preceded by Cornelius Fontem Esua (23 January 2006 - 30 December 2019)	Archbishop of Bamenda (since 30 December 2019)	Succeeded by Incumbent
