= Muea =

Locality in the Republic of Cameroon

Coordinates: 4°10′16″N 9°18′19″E

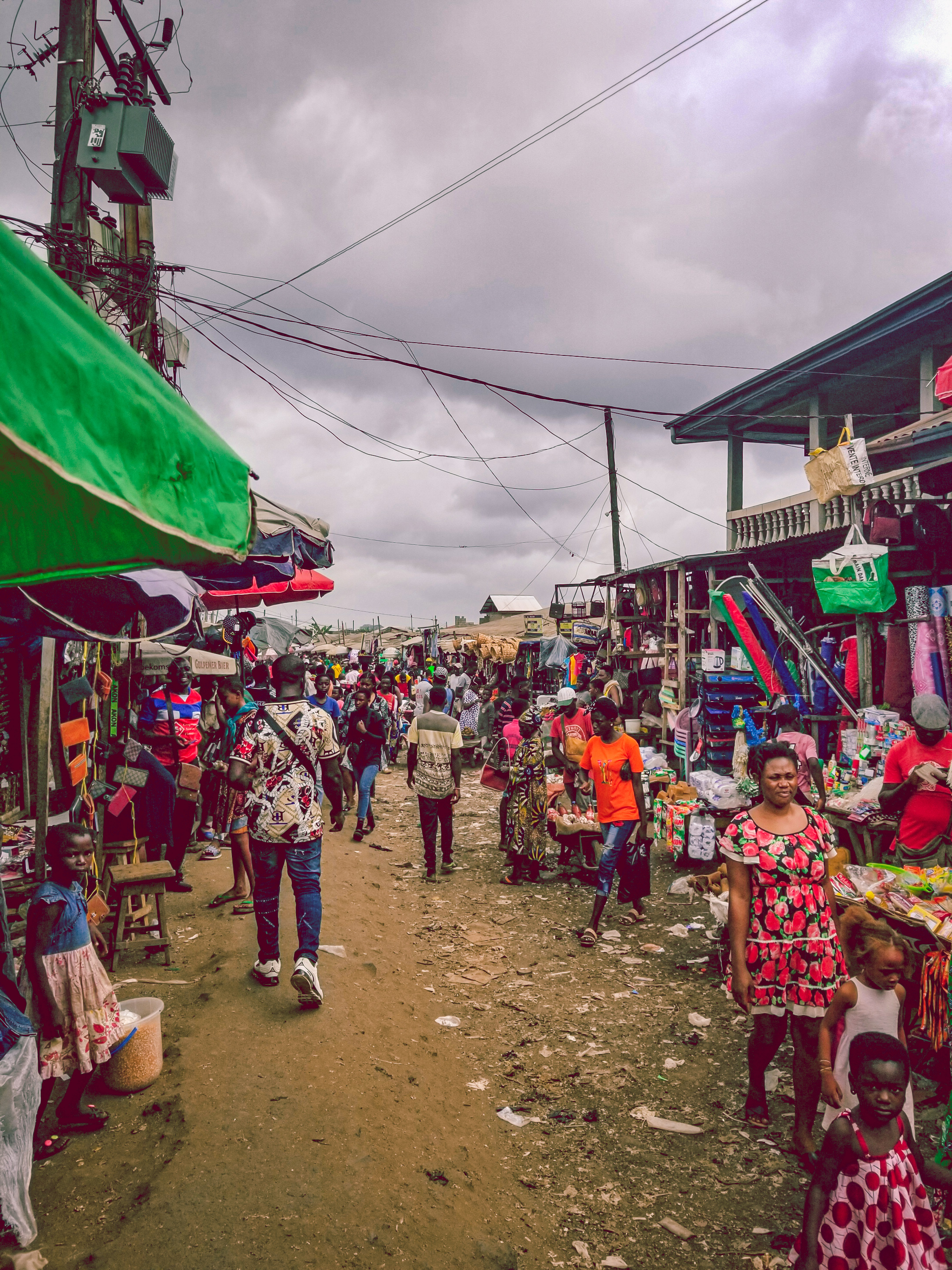
Activity at Muea Market

Muea is a village in Buea Subdivision of Fako Division in the Southwest Region of Cameroon.

== Overview ==
Muea, which is split into Upper Muea and Lower Muea, is a major town and farming community in the Buea Subdivision, Fako Division, Southwest Region of Cameroon. It is well-known for being a significant market for food commodities including vegetables and plantains, and local security issues have had a negative impact on it.

== Notable institutions ==
- Presbyterian Church
- St. Andrew Catholic Church
- G.B.H.S Muea
- C.M.A Muea (Hospital)

== Places ==
- Muea Market
