= Archdiocese of Bamenda =

Roman Catholic archdiocese in Cameroon

Coordinates: 5.9477°N 10.1566°E

Archdiocese of Bamenda Archidioecesis Bamendana Archidiocèse de Bamenda

Location
- Country: Cameroon
- Headquarters: Bamenda, Northwest Region, Cameroon

Statistics
- Area: 10,724 km^{2} (4,141 sq mi)
- Population: Total; Catholics: (as of 2023); 1,460,853; 616,515 (42.2%)
- Parishes: 57

Information
- Denomination: Catholic Church
- Sui iuris church: Latin Church
- Rite: Roman Rite
- Established: 13 August 1970; 56 years ago
- Secular priests: 168 (130 Diocesan, 38 Religious Orders)

Current leadership
- Pope: Leo XIV
- Metropolitan Archbishop: Andrew Nkea Fuanya
- Auxiliary Bishops: John Berinyuy Tatah
- Bishops emeritus: Cornelius Fontem Esua

The Roman Catholic Archdiocese of Bamenda is the metropolitan see of the ecclesiastical province of Bamenda in Cameroon. It was by the bull Tametsi Christianarum, of 13 August 1970, that Pope Paul VI erected the Diocese of Bamenda with territory detached from the Diocese of Buéa. On 18 March 1982 Pope John Paul II created, by the bull Eo Magis Ecclesia Catholica, the Archdiocese of Bamenda and the Ecclesiastical Province of Bamenda, and erected the Diocese of Kumbo with territory detached from the Diocese of Bamenda. Bamenda was by the same bull made into the metropolitan see of the ecclesiastical province with Buéa and Kumbo as its suffragans. Mamfe was later created into a diocese with territory detached from Buéa. Bamenda, therefore, has three suffragan sees: Buéa, Kumbo and Mamfe. As of November 2013 there are 35 parishes in Bamenda divided into six deaneries: Njinikom, Mankon, Widikum, Bambui, Wum and Ndop.

== History ==
- 13 August 1970: Established as Diocese of Bamenda from the Diocese of Buéa
- 18 March 1982: Promoted as Metropolitan Archdiocese of Bamenda

== Special churches ==
The seat of the archbishop is St Joseph's Metropolitan Cathedral in Bamenda. The oldest parish of the archdiocese is St Anthony's Parish Njinikom. Other significant parish churches include St Matthias, Widikum; St Patrick, Babanki Tungo; St Martin de Porres, Wum; St Peter, Bambui; and St Joseph, Bafut. There is a Mater Redemptoris shrine in Njangma, Mbatu in Njimafor parish. Furthermore, there is the Centenary Shrine of the Immaculate Conception at Fujua in Fundong parish, where the first missionaries of the Sacred Heart of the Belgian Region settled in 1913.

== Bishops ==
=== Ordinaries ===
Bishop of Bamenda (Roman rite)

- Paul Mbiybe Verdzekov (13 August 1970 – 18 March 1982 see below)

Metropolitan Archbishops of Bamenda (Roman rite)

- Paul Mbiybe Verdzekov (see above 18 March 1982 – 23 January 2006), retired
- Cornelius Fontem Esua (23 January 2006 – 30 December 2019), retired
- Andrew Nkea Fuanya (30 December 2019 – Present)

=== Coadjutor archbishop ===
- Cornelius Fontem Esua (2004-2006)

=== Auxiliary bishops ===
- Agapitus Enuyehnyoh Nfon (2011-2016), appointed Bishop of Kumba
- Michael Miabesue Bibi (2017-2021), appointed Bishop of Buéa in 2021
- John Berinyuy Tatah (2026-Present)

== Suffragan Dioceses ==
Do not confuse Kumba and Kumbo.

- Buéa
- Kumba
- Kumbo
- Mamfe

== Twinning ==
Since 1974 the diocese has been officially twinned with the Diocese of Portsmouth in England.

== Education ==
- Sacred Heart College, Bamenda

== See also ==
- Roman Catholicism in Cameroon

== Sources ==
- - Fr Tatah Mbuy, Archdiocesan Director of Communication
