= Episcopal Conference of Cameroon =

Assembly of Catholic bishops in central Africa

The National Episcopal Conference of Cameroon (French: Conférence Episcopal Nationale du Cameroun, CENC) is the episcopal conference of the Catholic Church in Cameroon. The origins date back to the missionaries of the Pallottines, who were the first to feel the need to meet to discuss issues related to the evangelization of the country. The CENC is a member of the Association of Regional Conferences of the Region of Central Africa and Symposium of Episcopal Conferences of Africa and Madagascar (SECAM).

== History ==
In September 1906 in Douala gathered vicars apostolic and missionary in Cameroon than in a missionary synod, which was repeated at the beginning of 1914. The First World War and the expulsion of the German missionaries from the country, the outlook changed. In fact the mission in Cameroon, after the world war, was divided in two: the missions depended Anglophone Nigeria, while the Francophone Central Africa. In June 1949, held in Yaounde, the first plenary lecture of the Ordinaries of the missions of the French-speaking Cameroon: five bishops took part under the chairmanship of the Apostolic Delegate. A second conference, this time with all the ordinaries of the country, was held in Nkongsamba in April 1955: by this time the meetings were held regularly apostolic vicars. The Second Vatican Council gave great impetus to the formation of the episcopal conferences: the Cameroonian bishops met several times in Rome, on November 24, 1962, and officially founded the Episcopal Conference of Cameroon, who today took the official name in 1972 to its constitution, drawn up already this year, were approved by the Holy See in 1986.

== List of presidents of the Bishops' Conference ==
- 1962–1976: Abo Jean Zoa of Yaoundé
- 1976–1982: Abp. Paul Verdzekov of Bamenda
- 1982–1985: Jean Zoa, of Yaoundé
- 1985–1991: Abp. Christian Wiyghan Tumi, of Garoua
- 1991–1994: Bishop Jean-Baptiste Ama, of the Diocese of Ebolowa-Kribi
- 1994–2000: Bishop (later Archbishop) André Wouking, Bishop of Bafoussam, later Yaoundé
- 2000–2004: Bishop Cornelius Fontem Esua, of Kumbo
- 2004–2010: Archbishop Simon-Victor Tonyé Bakot, of Yaoundé
- 2010–2013: Archbishop Joseph Atanga, S.J., of Bertoua
- 2013–2019: Archbishop Samuel Kleda, of Douala
- 2019–2022: Bishop Abraham Boualo Kome, of Bafang
- from April 30, 2022: Archbishop Andrew Nkea Fuanya, of Bamenda

== See also ==
- Episcopal conference
- Catholic Church in Cameroon
