= Joseph-Marie Ndi-Okalla =

Cameroonian Catholic prelate (born 1957)

The Most Reverend Joseph-Marie Ndi-Okalla
- Bishop of Mbalmayo, Cameroon
- Church: Catholic Church
- Archdiocese: Catholic Archdiocese of Yaoundé
- See: Diocese of Mbalmayo
- Appointed: 27 December 2016
- Installed: 18 February 2017
- Predecessor: Adalbert Ndzana (7 March 1987 - 27 December 2016)
- Successor: Incumbent

Orders
- Ordination: 13 August 1983 by Paul Etoga
- Consecration: 18 February 2017 by Piero Pioppo
- Rank: Bishop

Personal details
- Born: Joseph-Marie Ndi-Okalla; 21 November 1957 (age 68) Douala, Diocese of Douala, Littoral Region, Cameroon
- Parents: Florent Raymond Okalla Ndi and Therese Okalla Ndi née Abodo Ambara

Styles of Joseph-Marie Ndi-Okalla
- Reference style: Your Lordship; The Most Reverend
- Spoken style: His Lordship
- Religious style: Bishop

Joseph-Marie Ndi-Okalla (born 21 November 1957) is a Cameroonian Catholic prelate who serves as bishop of the Roman Catholic Diocese of Mbalmayo, in Cameroon since 27 December 2016. Before that, from 13 August 1983 until 27 December 2016, he was a priest of that same Catholic See. He was appointed by Pope Francis. He was consecrated by Piero Pioppo, Titular Archbishop of Torcello, on 18 February 2017, at Mbalmayo.

== Background and education ==
He was born on 21 November 1957 in Douala, in the Archdiocese of Douala, in Cameroon. He attended elementary school near his home area. He then studied at the Mbalmayo Minor Seminary. He studied for one year at the Notre Dame de l'Immaculée Conception Interdiocesan Major Seminary, in Nkolbisson, Yaoundé.

He was then sent to France to continue his priestly education there. He started out at the "Séminaire universitaire des Carmes" of the Catholic University of Paris. He then transferred to the Paris-Sorbonne University, where he studied Theology, History and Civilisation. At Sorbone University, he earned a Master's degree in Biblical Theology and Systematics. His Doctorate in Dogmatic Theology was awarded by the University of Bonn in Germany.

== Priesthood ==
On 6 November 1982, while a seminarian in France, he was ordained a deacon for the Diocese of Mbalmayo, Cameroon by Jacques Jean Edmond Georges Gaillot, Bishop of Évreux. The next year, on 13 August 1983, he was ordained a priest at Mbalmayo, by Paul Etoga, Bishop of Mbalmayo. He served as a priest in various roles and locations, including:

- Assistant priest.
- Professor of Missiology.
- Director of Studies at the Interdiocesan Major Seminary.
- Prelate responsible for the permanent formation of the clergy.
- Vice-Rector of the Catholic University of Central Africa in Yaoundé from 2011 until 2016.
- Secretary of the Episcopal Commission for the Doctrine of the Faith from 2011 until 2016.

== As bishop ==
27 December 2016, Pope Francis appointed him local ordinary of the Diocese of Mbalmayo, Cameroon. He succeeded Bishop Adalbert Ndzana, who retired that same day. Reverend Joseph-Marie Ndi-Okalla was consecrated bishop on 18 February 2017 at Mbalmayo by Piero Pioppo, Titular Archbishop of Torcello, assisted by Adalbert Ndzana, Bishop Emeritus of Mbalmayo and Jean-Marc Noël Aveline, Titular Bishop of Simidicca. He is reported to be the only Cameroonian Catholic bishop to attend the funeral of the Holy Father Pope Francis in person in 2025.

== See also ==
- Catholic Church in Cameroon

== Succession table ==
Catholic Church titles
Preceded by Adalbert Ndzana (7 March 1987 - 27 December 2016)	Bishop of Mbalmayo (since 27 December 2016)	Succeeded by Incumbent
