= Damase Zinga Atangana =

Cameroonian Catholic prelate (born 1964)

The Most Reverend Damase Zinga Atangana
- Bishop of Kribi, Cameroon
- Church: Catholic Church
- Archdiocese: Roman Catholic Archdiocese of Yaoundé
- See: Diocese of Kribi
- Appointed: 7 November 2015
- Installed: 8 December 2015
- Predecessor: Joseph Befe Ateba (19 June 2008 - 4 June 2014)
- Successor: Incumbent

Orders
- Ordination: 25 July 1992
- Consecration: 8 December 2015 by Piero Pioppo
- Rank: Bishop

Personal details
- Born: Damase Zinga Atangana; 9 December 1964 (age 61) Nkog-Bong, Centre Region, Diocese of Obala, Cameroon

Styles of Damase Zinga Atangana
- Reference style: Your Lordship; The Most Reverend
- Spoken style: His Lordship
- Religious style: Bishop

Damase Zinga Atangana (born 9 December 1964) is a Cameroonian Catholic prelate who serves as the bishop of the Roman Catholic Diocese of Kribi, in Cameroon since 7 November 2015. Before that, from 25 July 1992 until 7 November 2015, he served as a priest of the Roman Catholic Diocese of Obala, Cameroon. He was appointed bishop by Pope Francis. He was consecrated on 8 December 2015 by Piero Pioppo, Titular Archbishop of Torcello.

== Background and education ==
He was born on 9 December 1964 in Nkog-Bong, Diocese of Obala, Centre Region, Cameroon. He attended primary school in his home area. He attended the Jean XXIII College in Efok for his secondary school education. He continued with his studies at the Sainte Therese Minor Seminary and at the Collège François-Xavier-Vogt in Yaounde. He studied philosophy and theology at the Notre Dame de l'Immaculée Conception Interdiocesan Major Seminary, in Nkolbisson, Yaoundé. Later, he graduated with a Doctorate in Moral Theology and a Diploma in the History and Sciences of Religions from the Charles de Gaulle University – Lille III (now a component of the University of Lille). He then studied for a post-doctoral course in Bioethics at the Marc Bloch University in Strasbourg (now a component of the University of Strasbourg).

== Priest ==
He was ordained a priest on 25 July 1992 for the Diocese of Obala. He served as a priest until 7 November 2015. While a priest, he served in various roles and locations including:

- Rector of the Saint Joseph Minor Seminary in Efok from 1992 until 1997.
- Postgraduate studies of specialization in France from 1997 until 2003.
- Vicar General of the Diocese of Obala from 2003 until 2015.
- Pastor of Sainte Anne and diocesan Chaplain of the Dames Apostoliques from 2003 until 2010.
- Rector of the Notre-Dame du Mont Carmel Cathedral while under construction from 2010 until 2015.
- Member of the National Episcopal Commission for the Doctrine of the Faith from 2010 until 2015.

== Bishop ==
On 7 November 2015, Pope Francis appointed Reverend Father Monsignor Damase Zinga Atangana, previously a member of the clergy of the diocese of Obala as Bishop of the Diocese of Kribi, in Cameroon. He was consecrated on 8 December 2015 by Piero Pioppo, Titular Archbishop of Torcello assisted by Jean Mbarga, Archbishop of Yaoundé and Sosthène Léopold Bayemi Matjei, Bishop of Obala. He continues to minister to the faithful as the local ordinary of that Catholic See.

== See also ==
- Catholic Church in Cameroon

== Succession table ==
Catholic Church titles
Preceded by Joseph Befe Ateba (19 June 2008 - 4 June 2014)	Bishop of Kribi (since 7 November 2015)	Succeeded by (Incumbent)
