= François Achille Eyabi =

Cameroonian Catholic prelate (born 1961)

The Most Reverend François Achille Eyabi
- Bishop-Elect of Eséka, Cameroon
- Church: Catholic Church
- Archdiocese: Roman Catholic Archdiocese of Douala
- See: Diocese of Eséka
- Appointed: 14 November 2020
- Installed: 8 January 2021
- Predecessor: Dieudonné Bogmis (15 October 2004 - 25 August 2018)
- Successor: Incumbent

Orders
- Ordination: 30 July 1988
- Consecration: 8 January 2021 by Samuel Kleda
- Rank: Bishop

Personal details
- Born: François Achille Eyabi; 30 September 1961 (age 64) Ngambe, Archdiocese of Douala, Littoral Region, Cameroon

Styles of François Achille Eyabi
- Reference style: Your Lordship; The Most Reverend
- Spoken style: His Lordship
- Religious style: Bishop

Fr uançois Achille Eyabi (born 30 September 1961) is a Cameroonian Catholic prelate who serves as the Bishop of the Roman Catholic Diocese of Eséka in Cameroon since 14 November 2020. Before that, from 30 July 1988 until 22 March 1993, he served as a priest of the Archdiocese of Douala. Then from 22 March 1993 until 14 November 2020, he served as a priest of the Diocese of Edéa. He was appointed bishop by Pope Francis. He received his episcopal consecration at Eséka , on 8 January 2021 by the hands of Samuel Kleda, Archbishop of Douala.

== Background and education ==
François Achille Eyabi was born on 30 September 1961 in Ngambe, in the Sanaga-Maritime Department, Littoral Region, Cameroon. He attended primary school in his home area. For his secondary school education, he attended the Bonépoupa Minor Seminary in Bonépoupa. He continued his studies at the "Classical Lyceum of Edéa" He then entered the Saint Paul Major Seminary in Nylon, Douala. From 1996 until 2000 he studied at the Pontifical Urban University in Rome, Italy where he graduated with a Doctorate in sacred theology specializing in dogmatic aspects.

== Priest ==
He was ordained a priest of the Archdiocese of Douala on 3 July 1988. On 22 March 1993, when the Diocese of Edéa was created, he was incardinated in that new Catholic see. He served as a priest until 14 November 2020. While a priest, he served in various roles and locations, including:

- Parish vicar of Saint André Parish in Pouma from 1988 until 1992.
- Parish priest of Saint André in Pouma from 1992 until 1996.
- Episcopal vicar of Saint André Parish from 1992 until 1996.
- Studies at the Pontifical Urban University in Rome, Italy leading to the award of a doctorate in sacred theology from 1996 until 2000.
- Vicar general and rector of the Edéa Preparatory Seminary from 2001 until 2004.
- Rector of the Paul VI Provincial Major Seminary of Theology of Douala from 2005 until 2011.
- Vicar of the Diocesan Cathedral of the Diocese of Edéa from 2011 until 2015.
- Military chaplain in the Diocese of Edéa from 2011 until 2015.
- Episcopal vicar of the Diocese of Edéa from 2015 until 2020.
- Parish priest of the Edéa Diocesan Cathedral from 2015 until 2020.
- Secretary for Catholic education in the Diocese of Edéa.

== Bishop ==
On 14 November 2020, Pope Francis appointed Reverend Father Monsignor François Achille Eyabi, previously a member of the clergy of the Diocese of Edéa, as the new bishop of the Diocese of Eséka, Cameroon. He succeeded Bishop Dieudonné Bogmis (1955 – 2018), who died in office on 25 August 2018. He was consecrated and installed at Eséka on 8 January 2021 by Samuel Kleda, Archbishop of Douala assisted by Jean-Bosco Ntep, Bishop of Edéa and Abraham Boualo Kome, Bishop of Bafang. Bishop François Achille Eyabi continues to serve as the local ordinary at Eséka as of 2026.

== See also ==
- Catholic Church in Cameroon

== Succession table ==
Catholic Church titles
| Preceded by Dieudonné Bogmis (15 October 2004 - 25 August 2018) | Bishop of Eséka (since 14 November 2020) | Succeeded by (Incumbent) |
