= Philippe Alain Mbarga =

Cameroonian Catholic prelate (born 1968)

The Most Reverend Philippe Alain Mbarga
- Bishop of Ebolowa, Cameroon
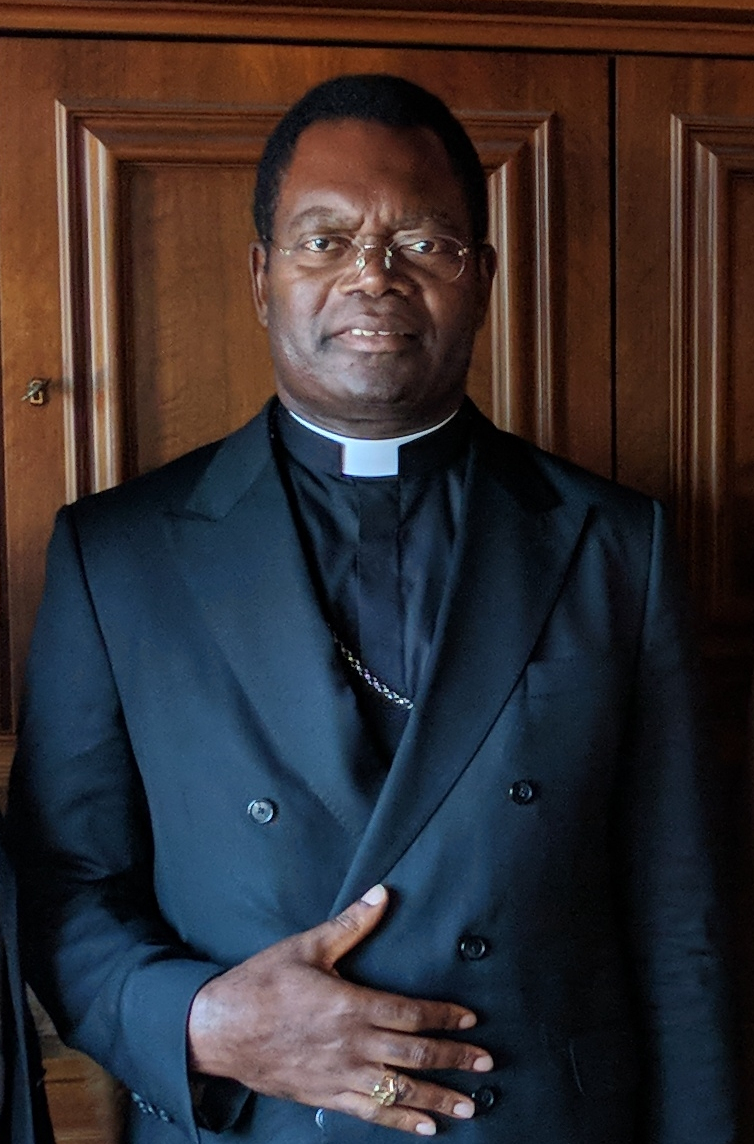
- Bishop Philippe Alain Mbarga
- Church: Catholic Church
- Archdiocese: Roman Catholic Archdiocese of Yaoundé
- See: Diocese of Ebolowa
- Appointed: 22 October 2016
- Installed: 8 December 2016
- Predecessor: Jean Mbarga (15 October 2004 - 31 October 2014)
- Successor: Incumbent

Orders
- Ordination: 10 December 1994 by Adalbert Ndzana
- Consecration: 8 December 2016 by Piero Pioppo
- Rank: Bishop

Personal details
- Born: Philippe Alain Mbarga; 28 January 1968 (age 58) Obout, Centre Region, Archdiocese of Yaounde, Cameroon

Styles of Philippe Alain Mbarga
- Reference style: Your Lordship; The Most Reverend
- Spoken style: His Lordship
- Religious style: Bishop

Philippe Alain Mbarga (born 28 January 1968) is a Cameroonian Catholic prelate who serves as the bishop of the Roman Catholic Diocese of Ebolowa, in Cameroon since 22 October 2016. Before that, from 10 December 1994 until his appointment as bishop, he served as a priest of the Roman Catholic Diocese of Mbalmayo, Cameroon. He was appointed bishop by Pope Francis. He was consecrated on 8 December 2016 at Ebolowa, by Piero Pioppo, Titular Archbishop of Torcello.

== Background and education ==
Philippe Alain Mbarga was born on 28 January 1968 in Obout, Diocese of Mbalmayo, Centre Region, Cameroon. He studied philosophy and theology at seminary in Cameroon. He holds a degree awarded by the Catholic University of Central Africa in Yaoundé. He holds a Doctorate in Biblical Theology, obtained in 2003, from the Fulda Faculty of Theology, an affiliate of the University of Marburg in Germany.

== Priest ==
He was ordained a priest for the Diocese of Mbalmayo by Adalbert Ndzana, Bishop of Mbalmayo on 10 December 1994. He served as a priest until 22 October 2016. While a priest, he served in various roles and locations including:

- Studies at the Catholic University of Central Africa in Yaoundé, leading to the award of a degrree from 1994 until 1996.
- Studies in Germany leading to the award of a doctorate in Biblical Theology from 1996 until 2003.
- Professor of Sacred Scripture at the Catholic University of Central Africa since 2003.
- Particular Secretary of the Rector of the Catholic University of Central Africa from 2003 until 2005.
- Rector of the Preparatory Seminary and the Interdiocesan Major Seminary of Philosophy Marie Reine des Apôtres of Otélé, Yaoundé from 2005 until 2008.
- Rector of the Interdiocesan Major Seminary of Theology Notre Dame de l'Immaculée Conception of Nkolbisson, Yaounde from 2008 until 2016.
- Secretary of the Commission for Apostolic Societies within the National Episcopal Conference of Cameroon from 2008 until 2016.

== Bishop ==
On 22 October 2016, Pope Francis appointed Reverend Philippe Alain Mbarga, previously a member of the clergy of Mbalmayo Diocese, as Bishop of Ebolowa Diocese, Cameroon. He was consecrated on 8 December 2016 at Ebolowa by Piero Pioppo, Titular Archbishop of Torcello assistedd by Adalbert Ndzana, Bishop of Mbalmayo and Ludwig Schick, Archbishop of Bamberg. He continues to serve as the local ordinary of that Roman Catholic See.

== See also ==
- Catholic Church in Cameroon

== Succession table ==
Catholic Church titles
Preceded by Jean Mbarga (15 October 2004 - 31 October 2014)	Bishop of Ebolowa (since 22 October 2016)	Succeeded by (Incumbent)
