= Abraham Kome =

Cameroonian Roman Catholic prelate (born 1969)

The Most Reverend Abraham Kome
- Bishop of Bafang, Cameroon
- Church: Catholic Church
- Archdiocese: Roman Catholic Archdiocese of Douala
- See: Bafang
- Appointed: 26 May 2012
- Installed: 15 July 2012

Orders
- Ordination: 11 December 1999
- Consecration: 15 July 2012 by Piero Pioppo
- Rank: Bishop

Personal details
- Born: Abraham Kome; 2 July 1969 (age 56) Loum-ville, Littoral Region, Diocese of Nkongsamba, Cameroon
- Motto: "Lucem et pax" (Light and peace)

Styles of Abraham Kome
- Reference style: Your Lordship; The Most Reverend
- Spoken style: His Lordship
- Religious style: Bishop

Abraham Boualo Kome (born 2 July 1969), is a Cameroonian Roman Catholic prelate who is the Bishop of the Roman Catholic Diocese of Bafang, Cameroon since 2012. He was appointed bishop by Pope Benedict XVI on 26 May 2012. He was consecrated and installed there on 15 July 2012. He concurrently served as Apostolic Administrator of the Roman Catholic Diocese of Bafia, Cameroon from 6 June 2017 until 11 July 2020.

== Background and education ==
He was born on 2 July 1969 in Loum-ville, Littoral Region, Diocese of Nkongsamba, in Cameroon. He studied at Saints Peter and Paul de Loum for his primary and secondary school education. He then studied Philosophy and Theology at the Seminary. He holds a Licentiate in Philosophy and Social Sciences awarded by the University of Dschang, in Cameroon. He was ordained a priest of the Diocese of Nkongsamba on 11 December 1999 at Nkongsamba, Cameroon.

== Priest ==
He was ordained a priest of the Roman Catholic Diocese of the Nkongsamba, Cameroon on 11 December 1999 at Nkongsamba, Cameroon.

As a priest, he served in various roles in different locations, including as:

- Vicar of the cathedral and assistant diocesan for the youth and children from 1999 until 2000.
- Prefect of Discipline and Studies of the Minor Seminary in Melong, Cameroon from 2000 until 2003.
- Diocesan Master of Ceremonies from 2000 until 2003.
- Parish priest of St. Francesco Saverio of Kekem in Bafang from 2006 until 2011.
- Vicar General of the Diocese of Nkongsamba, Cameroon from 2006 until 2011.
- Diocesan Administrator of Nkongsamba Diocese from 2011 until 2012.

== Bishop ==
On 26 May 2012, The Holy Father Benedict XVI created the new Diocese of Bafang in Cameroon from the Diocese of Nkongsamba. The Pope made the new diocese a suffragan of the Roman Catholic Archdiocese of Douala, Cameroon. The Reverend Father Abraham Kome, until then the diocesan Administrator of Nkongsamba was appointed the pioneer Ordinary of the new diocese of Bafang.

He was consecrated and installed at the Cathedral of the Immaculate Conception, in Bafang, Diocese of Bafang on 15 July 2012 by the hands of Archbishop Piero Pioppo, Titular Archbishop of Torcello assisted by Archbishop Samuel Kleda, Archbishop of Douala and Bishop Dieudonné Watio, Bishop of Bafoussam.

On 8 June 2017, following the death of Bishop Jean-Marie Benoît Balla, the Holly See appointed Monsignor Bishop Abraham Kome, Bishop of Bafang as Apostolic Administrator of Bafia, Cameroon. That administratorship ceased on 11 July 2020, the day a new bishop Emmanuel Dassi Youfang, was installed at Bafia.

== See also ==
- Catholic Church in Cameroon

== Succession table ==
Catholic Church titles
Preceded by None (Diocese created)	Bishop of Bafang (since 26 May 2012)	Succeeded by (Incumbent)
