= Christophe Zoa =

Cameroonian Catholic prelate (born 1961)

The Most Reverend Christophe Zoa
- Bishop of Sangmélima, Cameroon
- Church: Catholic Church
- Archdiocese: Catholic Archdiocese of Yaoundé
- See: Diocese of Sangmélima
- Appointed: 4 December 2008
- Installed: 30 January 2009
- Predecessor: Raphaël Marie Ze (23 January 1992 - 4 December 2008)
- Successor: Incumbent
- Previous posts: Auxiliary Bishop of Yaounde (30 November 2006 - 4 December 2008)

Orders
- Ordination: 15 June 1991 by Jean Zoa
- Consecration: 3 February 2007 by Simon-Victor Tonyé Bakot
- Rank: Bishop

Personal details
- Born: Christophe Zoa; 10 June 1961 (age 65) Yaoundé, Archdiocese of Yaoundé, Cameroon
- Motto: "Love will never pass away"

Styles of Christophe Zoa
- Reference style: Your Lordship; The Most Reverend
- Spoken style: His Lordship
- Religious style: Archbishop

Christophe Zoa (born 10 June 1961) is a Cameroonian Catholic prelate who serves as bishop of the Roman Catholic Diocese of Sangmélima, in Cameroon since 4 December 2008. Before that, from 30 November 2006 until 4 December 2008, he was auxiliary bishop of the Roman Catholic Diocese of Yaoundé. While auxiliary bishop, he concurrently served as titular bishop of Hilta. He was appointed by Pope Benedict XVI. He was consecrated by Simon-Victor Tonyé Bakot, archbishop of Yaoundé, on 3 February 2007. On 4 December 2008, the Holy Father transferred him to the Catholic Diocese of Sangmélima, Cameroon. He was installed there on 30 January 2009.

== Background and education ==
He was born in Yaoundé, Cameroon on 10 June 1961. He studied philosophy and theology at the Nkolbisison Major Seminary in Nkolbisson, Yaoundé. He continued his studies at the Catholic University of Central Africa at Yaoundé, where he graduated with a licentiate in Canon Law. Later, he earned a doctorate in the same subject from the Catholic Institute of Paris.

== Priesthood ==
Christophe Zoa was ordained a priest for the Roman Catholic Archdiocese of Yaoundé on 15 June 1991 by Jean Zoa, archbishop of Yaoundé. He served as a priest until 30 November 2006. While a priest, he served in various roles and locations, including:

- Assistant priest in Yaoundé Archdiocese 1991–1992
- Parish priest in various parishes in the archdiocese 1992–2000.
- Studies at the Université Catholique d'Afrique Centrale, in Yaoundé, leading to the award of a licentiate in a canon law 1994–1997
- Studies in Rome, Italy at the Catholic Institute of Paris, leading to the award of a doctorate in canon law 2001–2005
- Chancellor of the Catholic Archdiocese of Yaoundé 2005–2006

== As bishop ==
On 30 November 2006, Pope Benedict XVI appointed Reverend Father Christophe Zoa, previously a member of the clergy of the Archdiocese of Yaoundé, as auxiliary bishop of the same Ecclesiastical Metropolitan Province. He was contemporaneously appointed titular bishop of Hilta. He was consecrated on 3 February 2007 at Yaoundé by Simon-Victor Tonyé Bakot, archbishop of Yaoundé, assisted by Eliseo Antonio Ariotti, titular archbishop of Vibiana and Antoine Ntalou, archbishop of Garoua.

On 4 December 2008, the Holy Father transferred Bishop Christopher Zoa, previously auxiliary bishop of Yaoundé, to the Diocese of Sangmélima, Cameroon. He was installed at Sangmélima on 30 January 2009. He continues to serve as the local ordinary at Sangmélima.

== See also ==
- Catholic Church in Cameroon

== Succession table ==
Catholic Church titles
Preceded by Raphaël Marie Ze (23 January 1992 - 4 December 2008)	Bishop of Sangmélima (since 4 December 2008)	Succeeded by (Incumbent)
Preceded by	Auxiliary Bishop of Yaoundé (30 November 2006 - 4 December 2008)	Succeeded by
