= Athanase Bala =

Cameroonian Roman Catholic bishop (1927–2019)

Athanase Bala C.S.Sp.
- Bishop of Bafia
- Church: Catholic Church
- Diocese: Diocese of Bafia
- In office: 21 December 1977 – 3 May 2003
- Predecessor: André Loucheur
- Successor: Jean-Marie Benoît Balla
- Previous posts: Titular Bishop of Gegi (1976-1977); Coadjutor Bishop of Bafia (1976-1977)

Orders
- Ordination: 31 July 1955 by René Graffin
- Consecration: 26 September 1976 by Jean Zoa

Personal details
- Born: 2 March 1927 Nlong (southwest of Lobo), mandatory Territory of Cameroun, French Empire
- Died: 3 September 2019 (aged 92) Yaoundé, Cameroon

Athanase Bala (2 March 1927 – 3 September 2019) was a Cameroonian Roman Catholic bishop.

Bala was born in Cameroon and was ordained to the priesthood in 1955. He served as titular bishop of Gegi and coadjutor bishop of the Roman Catholic Diocese of Bafia, Cameroon, from 1976 until 1977. Bala then served as bishop of the Bafia Diocese from 1977 until 2003.
