= André Wouking =

Cameroonian Catholic prelate (1930 - 2002)

The Most Reverend André Wouking
- Archdishop of Yaoundé, Cameroon (Deceased)
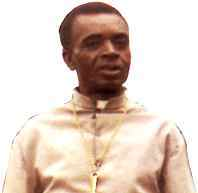
- Archbishop André Wouking
- Church: Catholic Church
- Archdiocese: Roman Catholic Archdiocese of Yaoundé
- See: Yaoundé
- Appointed: 27 November 1998
- Installed: 27 November 1998
- Term ended: 10 November 2002
- Predecessor: Jean Zoa (11 September 1961 - 20 March 1998)
- Successor: Simon-Victor Tonyé Bakot (18 October 2003 - 29 July 2013)
- Other posts: Apostolic Administrator of Nkongsamba, Cameroon (21 November 1992 - 10 June 1995); Bishop of Bafoussam, Cameroon (15 March 1979 - 27 November 1998)

Orders
- Ordination: 9 April 1961
- Consecration: 9 June 1979 by Paul Mbiybe Verdzekov
- Rank: Archbishop

Personal details
- Born: André Wouking; 14 June 1930 Dschang, Diocese of Bafoussam, West Region, Cameroon
- Died: 10 November 2002 (aged 72) Paris, France
- Motto: "Speak, Lord, for your servant is listening"

Styles of André Wouking
- Reference style: His Grace; The Right Reverend
- Spoken style: Your Grace
- Religious style: Bishop

André Wouking (born 30 June 1930) is a Cameroonian Catholic prelate who was served as the archbishop of the Roman Catholic Archdiocese of Yaoundé in Cameroon from 27 November 1998 until his death in office on 10 November 2002. Before that, from 15 March 1979 until 27 November 1998, he served as the Bishop of the Catholic Diocese of Bafoussam, in the Ecclesiastical Metropolitan Province of Douala. From 9 April 1961 until 15 March 1979, he was a priest for the Diocese of Bafoussam. Pope John Paul II appointed him bishop. He was consecrated on 9 June 1979 at Bafoussam, Cameroon by Paul Mbiybe Verdzekov, Bishop of Bamenda. He served as apostolic administrator of the Diocese of Nkongsamba from 21 November 1992 to 10 June 1995. The Holy Father transferred him to the Archdiocese of Yaoundé on 27 November 1998 and elevated him to Archbishop of that Metropolitan Province. Archbishop André Wouking died while in office on 10 November 2002.

== Background and education ==
André Wouking was born on 14 June 1930 at Dschang, West Region, in Cameroon, to Sylvestre Tsamo and Anne Nguimeya. André Wouking was the eldest "in a family of four children, many others having died in infancy". He received Catholic baptism at the age of two weeks. He received his first communion in 1938. He was confirmed in the Catholic Church in 1940.

André Wouking's father worked as a bricklayer at the Catholic Mission in Dschang. He entrusted his son, the future archbishop, to Reverend Father Bader, a priest at the mission, who guided him through his priestly training. In August 1948, he entered the Bafang Minor Seminary, in Bafang, West Region of Cameroon. The next year, he transferred to Melong Minor Seminary in Melong, Southwest Region. He completed his secondary schooling there in 1954. That year he entered Otélé Major Catholic Seminary in Otélé, Centre Region, where he completed his priestly education.

== Priest ==
He was ordained a priest at Dschang by Paul Bouque, Bishop of Nkongsamba on 9 April 1961. He served as a priest until 15 March 1979. While a priest, he served in various roles and locations including:

- Parish vicar and Director of the schools and Saint Laurent College in Bafou from 1961 until 1962.
- Parish vicar of Souza Parish from 1962 until 1965.
- Director of the mission schools in the Diocese of Nkongsamba from 1962 until 1965.
- Director of Herbert College from 1962 until 1965.
- Parish priest of Souza Parish from 1965 untl 1966.
- Parish priest of Bangangté Parish from 1966 until 1967.
- Parish priest of Tamdja Parish in Bafoussam from 1967 until 1970.
- Director of the Saint Thomas Aquinas College in Bafoussam from 1967 until 1970.
- Chancellor of the Diocese of Bafoussam from 1970 until 1972.
- Dean of the Diocese of Bafoussam from 1972 until 1977.
- Appointed President of the Ecclesiastical Tribunal for Bafoussam Diocese in 1975.
- Elected President of the Presbyteral Council for Bafoussam Diocese from 1975 until 1978.
- Advisor to Bishop Denis Ngande in 1972.
- Vicar General of Bafoussam Diocese from 1976 until 1978.
- Vicar Capitular of the Diocesan Presbyteral Council of Bofoussam Diocese from 1978 until 1979.
- Apostolic Administrator of the Diocese of Bafoussam from 1978 until 1979.

== Bishop ==
On 15 March 1979, Pope John Paul II appointed him Bishop of the Catholic Diocese of Bafoussam, in the Archdiocese of Douala. He was consecrated at Bafoussam, Cameroon on 9 June 1979 by Paul Mbiybe Verdzekov, Bishop of Bamenda assisted by Jacques Joseph François de Bernon, Bishop of Maroua-Mokolo and Thomas Mongo, Bishop Emeritus of Douala.

When Bishop Thomas Kuissi retired from the pastoral care of the Diocese of Nkongsamba in 1992, The Holy Father appointed Bishop Andre Wouking of Bafoussam to concurrently work as Apostolic Administrator of the Nkongsamba Catholic Diocese. That admnistratorship ceased in 1995 when Bishop Dieudonné Watio was installed as the new local ordinary at Nkongsamba on 10 June 1995. On 27 November 1998, following the death in office of Archbbishop Jean Zoa of Yaoundé on 20 March 1998, The Holy Father appointed Bishop André Wouking to succeed Archbishop Zoa at Younde.

== Illness and death ==
During the Northern Winter of 2002, Archbishop André Wouking suffered what is described as a cerebrovascular accident, commonly known as a stroke. He was initially admitted to the University Teaching Hospital of Yaounde (French:Centre Hospitalier et Universitaire de Yaoundé). He was then transferred to the Centre hospitalier intercommunal de Poissy-Saint-Germain-en-Laye, near Paris, France, where he died of complications of cerebral hemorrhage (bleeding inside the brain) on 10 November 2002 at the age of 72 years.

His body was flown to Cameroon and was buried on 22 November 2002 at the Our Lady of Victories Cathedral, Yaoundé. The mass was led by Félix del Blanco Prieto, the Papal Nuncio. The attendees included Paul Biya, the president of Cameroon.

== See also ==
- Catholic Church in Cameroon

== Succession table ==
Catholic Church titles
| Preceded by Jean Zoa (11 September 1961 - 20 March 1998) | Archbishop of Yaoundé (27 November 1998 - 10 November 2002) | Succeeded by Simon-Victor Tonyé Bakot (18 October 2003 - 29 July 2013) |
| Preceded by Denis Ngande (5 February 1970 - 28 February 1978) | Bishop of Bafoussam (15 March 1979 - 27 November 1998) | Succeeded by Joseph Atanga (22 June 1999 - 3 December 2009) |
