= Jean-Bosco Ntep =

Cameroonian Catholic prelate (born 1951)

The Most Reverend Jean-Bosco Ntep
- Bishop Emeritus of Edéa, Cameroon
- Church: Catholic Church
- Archdiocese: Catholic Archdiocese of Douala
- See: Diocese of Edéa
- Appointed: 15 October 2004
- Installed: 4 December 2004
- Term ended: 4 June 2026
- Predecessor: Simon-Victor Tonyé Bakot (22 March 1993 - 18 October 2003)
- Previous post: Bishop of Diocese of Eséka (22 March 1993 - 15 October 2004)

Orders
- Ordination: 25 March 1979
- Consecration: 4 July 1993 by Cardinal Christian Wiyghan Tumi
- Rank: Bishop

Personal details
- Born: Jean-Bosco Ntep; 3 April 1951 (age 75) Hikoamaen, Centre Region, Cameroon

Styles of Jean-Bosco Ntep
- Reference style: Your Lordship; The Most Reverend
- Spoken style: His Lordship
- Religious style: Bishop

Jean-Bosco Ntep (born 3 April 1951) is a Cameroonian Catholic prelate who served as bishop of the Roman Catholic Diocese of Edéa, in Cameroon from 15 October 2004 until 4 June 2026. Before that, from 22 March 1993 until 15 October 2004, he was bishop the Diocese of Eséka, Cameroon. He was appointed by Pope John Paul II. He was consecrated by Cardinal Christian Wiyghan Tumi, Archbishop of Douala, on 4 July 1993, at Eséka. On 15 October 2004, The Holy Father transfereed him to Edéa as the local ordinary. He was installed at Edéa on 4 December 2004. On 4 June 2026, Pope Leo XIV accepted his resignation.

== Background and education ==
Jean-Bosco Ntep was born on 3 April 1951 at Hikoamaen, Centre Region, Cameroon. He studied philosophy and theology at seminary before he was ordained a priest. He studied in France and obtained advanced degrees in theology, accounting and finance.

== Priesthood ==
He was ordained a priest on 25 March 1979 by Simon Tonye, Bishop of Douala. He served as a priest until 22 March 1993. While a priest, he served in various roles and locations, including assignment to Saint Andrew Parish in Pouma, from 1979 until 1984.

== Bishop ==
On 22 March 1993, Pope John Paul II appointed him bishop of the Roman Catholic Diocese of Eséka, Cameroon. He was the pioneer bishop of that new Catholic see, created the same day he was appointed. He received his episcopal consecration on 4 July 1993 by the hands of Cardinal Christian Wiyghan Tumi, Archbishop of Douala assisted by Santos Abril y Castelló, Titular Archbishop of Tamada and André Wouking, Bishop of Bafoussam.

The Holy Father transferred him to the Roman Catholic Diocese of Edéa on 15 October 2004 and appointed him local ordinary there. He was installed at Edéa on 4 December 2004. On 4 June 2026, Pope Leo XIV accepted his resignation as Bishop of Edéa. The Holy Father appointed Monsignor Paul Nyaga Nwaha as apostolic administrator to administer the diocese until a suitable local ordinary is appointed to succeed there.

== See also ==
- Catholic Church in Cameroon

== Succession table ==
Catholic Church titles
Preceded by Simon-Victor Tonyé Bakot (22 March 1993 - 18 October 2003)	Bishop of Edéa (15 October 2004 - 4 June 2026)	Succeeded by Sede vacante
Preceded by None (Diocese created)	Bishop of Eséka (22 March 1993 - 15 October 2004)	Succeeded by Dieudonné Bogmis (15 October 2004 - 25 August 2018)
