= Jean-Baptiste Ama =

Cameroonian Catholic prelate (1926–2004)

The Most Reverend Jean-Baptiste Ama
- Bishop Emeritus of Ebolowa, Cameroon (Deceased)
- Church: Catholic Church
- Archdiocese: Catholic Archdiocese of Yaoundé
- See: Diocese of Ebolowa
- Appointed: 20 May 1991
- Installed: 20 May 1991
- Term ended: 15 March 2002
- Predecessor: None (Diocese created)
- Successor: Jean Mbarga (15 October 2004 – 31 October 2014)
- Previous posts: Bishop of Sangmélima (22 July 1983 – 20 May 1991); Auxiliary Bishop of Yaounde (12 December 1974 – 22 July 1983)

Orders
- Ordination: 4 June 1955
- Consecration: 2 February 1975 by Jean Zoa
- Rank: Bishop

Personal details
- Born: Jean-Baptiste Ama; 20 August 1926 Koundou, Centre Region, Cameroon
- Died: 29 February 2004 (aged 77)

Styles of Jean-Baptiste Ama
- Reference style: Your Lordship; The Most Reverend
- Spoken style: His Lordship
- Religious style: Archbishop

Jean-Baptiste Ama (20 August 1926 – 29 February 2004) is a Cameroonian Catholic prelate who served as Bishop of the Roman Catholic Diocese of Ebolowa, in Cameroon from 20 May 1991 until his age-related retirement on 15 March 2002. Before that, from 22 July 1983 until 20 May 1991, he was the bishop of the Roman Catholic Diocese of Sangmélima, Cameroon. From 12 December 1974 until 22 July 1983, he served as auxiliary bishop of the Catholic Archdiocese of Yaoundé. He concurrently served as Titular Bishop of Accia, while auxiliary bishop. He was appointed by Pope Paul VI. He was consecrated by Jean Zoa, Archbishop of Yaoundé assisted by Paul Etoga, Bishop of Mbalmayo and Simon Tonyé, Bishop of Douala.

The Holy Father Pope John Paul II, transferred him the Catholic Diocese of Sangmélima, Cameroon on 22 July 1983. He served there until 20 May 1991, when he was appointed local ordinary at Diocese of Ebolowa. On the 15 March 2002, the Holy Father accepted the resignation from the pastoral care from the Catholic Diocese of Ebolowa, presented by Bishop Jean-Baptiste Ama. He died on 29 February 2004 at the age of 77 years and is now Bishop Emeritus (Deceased) of Ebolowa, Cameroon.

== Background and education ==
He was born in Koundou, Archdiocese of Yaoundé in Cameroon on 20 August 1926. He studied philosophy and theology at seminary before he was ordained a priest.

== Priesthood ==
He was ordained a priest for the Archdiocese of Yaoundé on 4 June 1955. He served as a priest until 12 December 1974.

== As bishop ==
On 12 December 1974, Pope Paul VI appointed him auxiliary bishop of the Archidiocese of Yaoundé, Cameroon. He was concomitantly appointed Titular Bishop of Accia.He was consecrated on 2 February 1975 at Yaoundé by Jean Zoa, Archbishop of Yaoundé, Cameroon. He served in that capacity until 22 July 1983, when Pope John Paul II appointed him Bishop of the Roman Catholic Diocese of Sangmélima, Cameroon. He served in that capacity until 20 May 1991. On that date, The Holy Father transferred him to the Diocese of Ebolowa, that was created that same day. He was appointed as the pioneer bishop of that new Catholic See. He served there until his age-related retirement on 15 March 2002. While local ordinary at Ebolowa, he served as President of the National Conference of Catholic Bishops of Cameroon from 1991 until 1994.

== Illness and death ==
Bishop Ama fell ill in February 2004. He was flown to Milan, Italy, for medical care. He died in a hospital in city on 29 February 2004, at the age 77 years and 6 months.

== See also ==
- Catholic Church in Cameroon

== Succession table ==
Catholic Church titles
Preceded by None (Diocese created)	Bishop of Ebolowa (20 May 1991 – 15 March 2002)	Succeeded by Jean Mbarga (15 October 2004 – 31 October 2014)
Preceded by Pierre-Célestin Nkou (18 January 1963 – 16 May 1983)	Bishop of Sangmélima (22 July 1983 – 20 May 1991)	Succeeded by Raphaël Marie Ze (23 January 1992 – 4 December 2008)
Preceded by	Auxiliary Bishop of Yaoundé (12 December 1974 – 22 July 1983)	Succeeded by
