= Jean-Marie Benoît Balla =

Cameroonian Catholic bishop (1959–2017)

The Most Reverend Jean-Marie Benoît Balla
- Bishop of Bafia, Cameroon (Deceased)
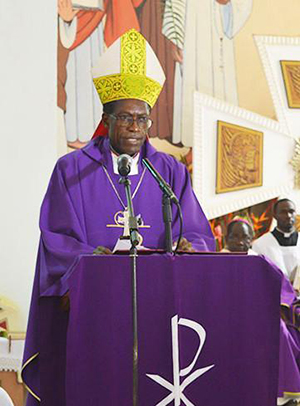
- Bishop Balla during his last public appearance, in the Cathedral of Bafia
- Church: Catholic Church
- Archdiocese: Roman Catholic Archdiocese of Douala
- See: Diocese of Bafia
- Appointed: 3 May 2003
- Installed: 12 July 2003
- Term ended: 31 May 2017
- Predecessor: Athanase Bala
- Successor: Emmanuel Dassi Youfang

Orders
- Ordination: 20 June 1987 by Jean Zoa
- Consecration: 12 July 2003 by Félix del Blanco Prieto
- Rank: Bishop

Personal details
- Born: Jean-Marie Benoît Balla; May 10, 1959 Oweng, Centre Region, Cameroon
- Died: 31 May 2017 (aged 58) Sanaga River, Cameroon

Styles of Jean-Marie Benoît Balla
- Reference style: Your Lordship; The Most Reverend
- Spoken style: His Lordship
- Religious style: Bishop

Jean-Marie Benoît Balla (10 May 1959 – 31 May 2017) was a Cameroonian Catholic bishop who served as the Bishop of the Roman Catholic Diocese of Bafia from May 2003 until his death in May 2017. He was appointed bishop on 3 May 2003 by Pope John Paul II. He died in office on 31 May 2017 under mysterious circumstances.

== Early life and education ==
He was born on 10 May 1959, in Oweng (also Oveng), in the Division of Mefou and Akono, in the Center Region of Cameroon. This lies in the Roman Catholic Archdiocese of Yaoundé. After he studied philosophy and theology at seminary, he was ordained priest of Yaounde Archdiocese on 20 June 1987.

== Priest ==
He was ordained a priest for the Archdiocese of Yaoundé on 20 June 1987 by the late Archbishop Jean Zoa, Archbishop of Yaoundé. He was assigned to parish work. He then headed the Yaounde Minor Seminary. He also taught at the Nkolbisson Major Seminary in Nkolbisson, a suburb of Yaounde, Cameroon.

== Bishop ==
Pope John Paul II appointed him Bishop of the Roman Catholic Diocese of Bafia on 3 May 2003 and he was consecrated a bishop on 12 July 2003 by the hands of Archbishop Félix del Blanco Prieto, Titular Archbishop of Vannida assisted by Bishop Athanase Bala, Bishop Emeritus of Bafia and Bishop Cornelius Fontem Esua, Bishop of Kumbo.

== Death ==
He was reported missing on the evening of 30 May 2017. When his car was located on a bridge over the Sanaga River on 31 May, it contained a note that said: "Do not look for me! I am in the water." There was no evidence of violence.

On 2 June fishermen discovered his body 7 kilometres (4 mi) downstream of the bridge, and authorities estimated his death occurred on 31 May 2017. An autopsy found signs of torture and that he had died days before his body was placed in the water only to be found after a few hours. Other murders of priests in Cameroon have gone unsolved, including that of the rector of the minor seminary of Bafia earlier in May.

Interpol commissioned a second autopsy by two German doctors who reported that "no trace of violence was found on the body of the deceased", after which the Central Appeal Court determined that “drowning is the most probable cause of death of the bishop". Some of Bala's relatives questioned whether the authorities had substituted a different body for the Interpol autopsy.

On 3 August 2017, Joseph Akonga Essomba, the interim administrator of the diocese, claimed Balla's murderers were being protected by government officials. He claimed that Balla attacked gay priests, who later pretended to mourn him, and that it was his opposition to homosexuality that had prompted his murder.

Catholics in Cameroon whose murders remained unsolved include Yves Plumey, Archbishop Emeritus of the Roman Catholic Archdiocese of Garoua (1991); the editor of the Catholic daily L'Effort camerounnais Joseph Mbassi (1988); Society of Jesus theologian Englebert Mveng, SJ (1995); and the French sisters Germaine Marie Husband and Marie Léone Bordy (1992).

Bishop Jean-Marie Benoît Balla (Deceased) formerly Bishop of Bafia, Cameroon was buried in the Saint Sebastian Major Cathedral at Bafia, in the diocese of Bafia on 3 August 2017. His grave and the Cathedral were desecrated "between the night of 27 August 2017 and the morning of 28 August 2017". "The cathedral was closed to the public worship until a penitential rite was celebrated as prescribed by the Code and the liturgical rite".

== See also ==
- Catholic Church in Cameroon

== Succession table ==
Catholic Church titles
Preceded by Athanase Bala (21 December 1977 - 3 May 2003)	Bishop of Baifa (3 May 2003 - 31 May 2017)	Succeeded by Emmanuel Dassi Youfang (since 13 May 2020)
