= Bayemi =

Bayemi is a name. Notable people with the name include:

- Eric Bayemi (born 1983), Cameroonian footballer
- Sosthène Léopold Bayemi Matjei (born 1964), Cameroonian bishop
