= Diocese of Obala =

Roman Catholic diocese in Cameroon

Coordinates: 4.1682°N 11.5336°E

Diocese of Obala Dioecesis Obalana Diocèse d'Obala

Location
- Country: Cameroon
- Metropolitan: Archdiocese of Yaoundé
- Headquarters: Obala, Cameroon

Statistics
- Area: 14,849 km^{2} (5,733 sq mi)
- Population: Total; Catholics: (as of 2023); 981,000; 578,000 (58.9%)
- Parishes: 62

Information
- Denomination: Catholic Church
- Sui iuris church: Latin Church
- Rite: Roman Rite
- Established: 3 July 1987; 39 years ago
- Secular priests: 168

Current leadership
- Pope: Leo XIV
- Bishop: Sosthène Léopold Bayemi Matjei
- Metropolitan Archbishop: Jean Mbarga

The Roman Catholic Diocese of Obala (Latin: Obalan(us)) is a diocese located in the city of Obala in the ecclesiastical province of Yaoundé in Cameroon.

== History ==
- 3 July 1987: Established as Diocese of Obala from the Metropolitan Archdiocese of Yaoundé.

== Bishops ==
- Bishops of Obala (Latin Rite), in reverse chronological order
  - Bishop Sosthène Léopold Bayemi Matjei (3 December 2009 − Present)
  - Bishop Jérôme Owono-Mimboe (3 July 1987 − 3 December 2009), retired

=== Other priests of this diocese who became bishops ===
- Dieudonné Espoir Atangana, appointed Bishop of Nkongsamba in 2012
- Damase Zinga Atangana, appointed Bishop of Kribi in 2015

== See also ==
- Roman Catholicism in Cameroon
