= Diocese of Eséka =

Roman Catholic diocese in Cameroon

Coordinates: 3.6404°N 10.7844°E

Diocese of Eséka Dioecesis Esekanensis

Location
- Country: Cameroon
- Ecclesiastical province: Archdiocese of Douala
- Headquarters: Eséka, Centre Region

Information
- Denomination: Catholic Church
- Sui iuris church: Latin Church
- Rite: Roman Rite
- Established: 22 March 1993; 33 years ago
- Cathedral: Cathédrale Notre Dame de Fatima in Eséka

Current leadership
- Pope: Leo XIV
- Bishop: François Achille Eyabi
- Metropolitan Archbishop: Samuel Kleda

The Roman Catholic Diocese of Eséka (Latin: Esekanen(sis)) is a diocese located in the city of Eséka in the ecclesiastical province of Douala in Cameroon.

== History ==
- March 22, 1993: Established as Diocese of Eséka from the Metropolitan Archdiocese of Douala

== Special churches ==
The cathedral is the Cathédrale Notre Dame de Fatima in Eseka.

== Bishops ==
- Bishops of Eséka (Roman rite), in reverse chronological order:
  - Bishop François Achille Eyabi (14 November 2020 – )
  - Bishop Dieudonné Bogmis (15 October 2004 – 25 August 2018)
  - Bishop Jean-Bosco Ntep (22 March 1993 – 15 October 2004), appointed Bishop of Edéa

=== Other priest of this diocese who became bishop ===
- Sosthène Léopold Bayemi Matjei, appointed Bishop of Obala in 2009

== See also ==
- Roman Catholicism in Cameroon
