= Festival Mbog Li a'a =

Mbog Li a'a Festival
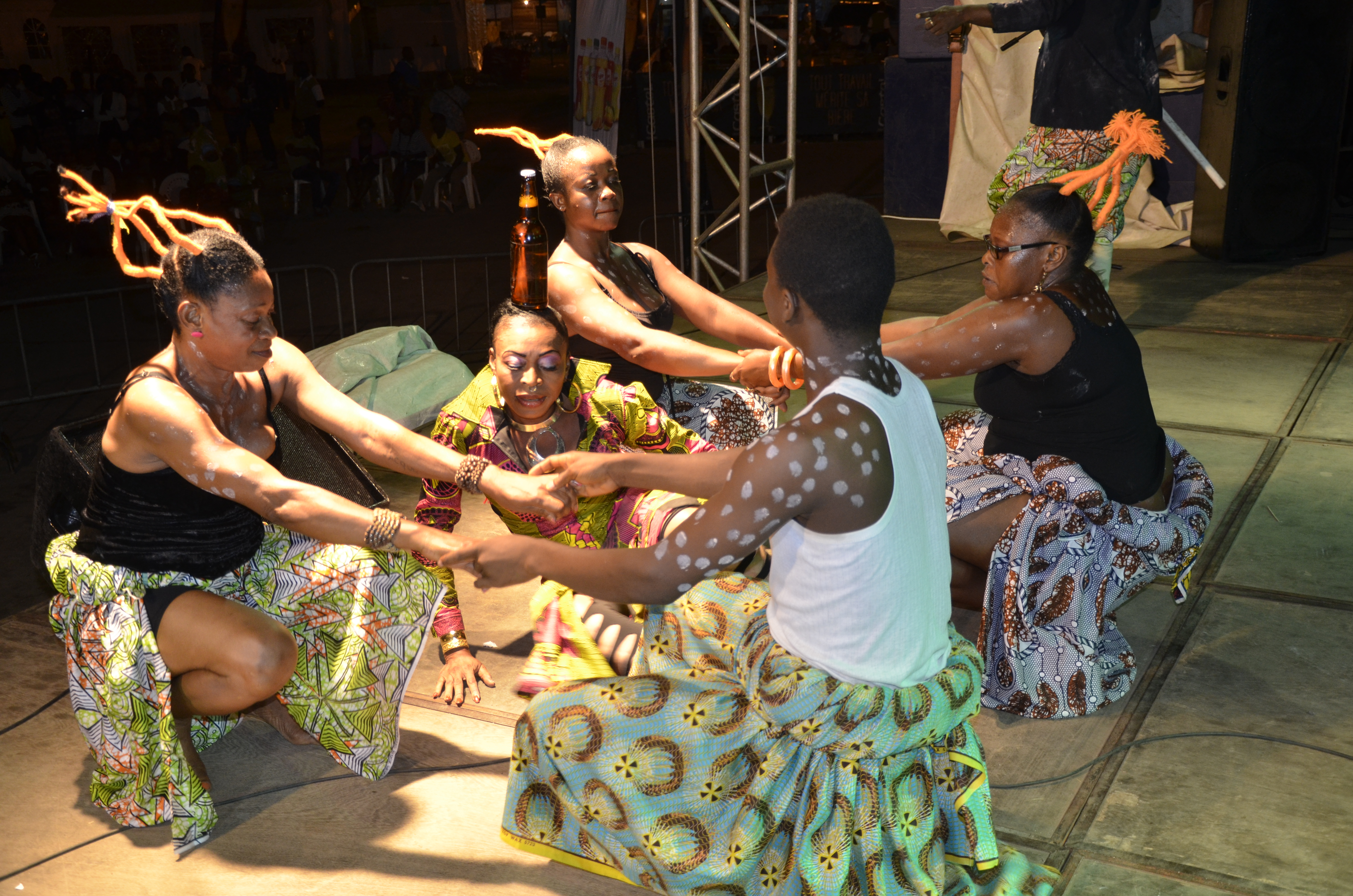
- Dance performance at the 2016 Mbog Li a'a Festival
- Location: Cameroon
- Years active: 1999–present
- Founded: 1999
- Website: festival.mbogliaa.com

The Mbog Li a'a festival is a traveling festival that reunites qthe Bassa, Mpoo and Bati peoples of Cameroon It is an itinerant (moving) and periodic festival that typically occurs only once every few years organised by the Mbog Li a'a Association The festival was created in 1999 in Pouma, it is a multidisciplinary cultural event. It celebrated its fifth edition in 2016, in Douala from 25 June to 3 July 2016.

== Description ==
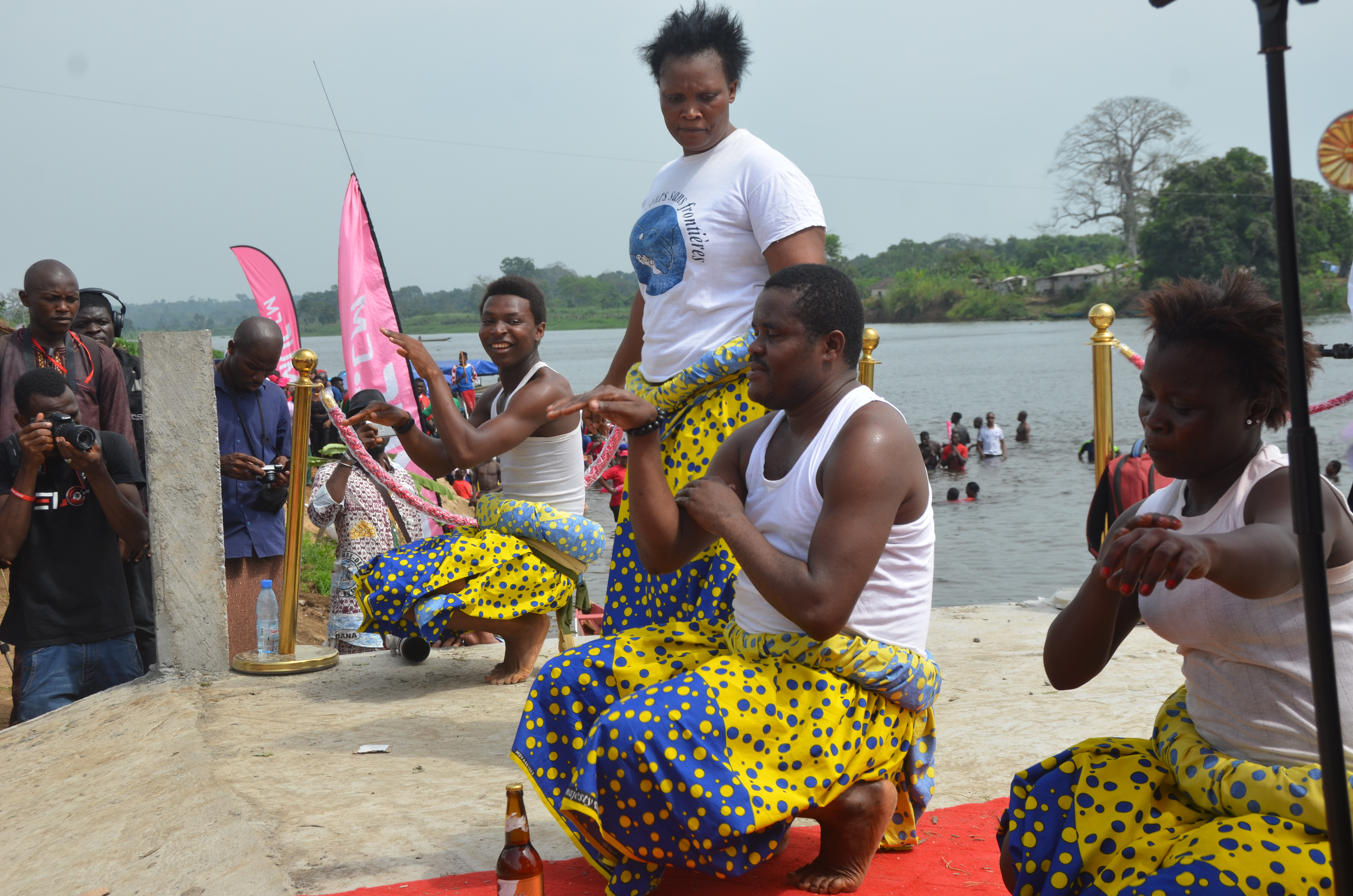
Assiko dance performance at the Ngondo Festival

This cultural event for people from the Ngog Lituba geographical area consists of exhibitions, conferences and debates, the election of Miss Mbog Liaa, concerts, traditional dances and gastronomic exhibitions. It is chaired in 2016 by Jérôme Minlend. It is chaired in 2016 by Jérôme Minlend.

Belka Tobis hosted the Mbog Liaa festival in 2016. The Kundè group performed during this festival.

== See also ==
- Culture of Cameroon
