= Diocese of Kribi =

Roman Catholic diocese in Cameroon

Coordinates: 2.9375°N 9.9082°E

Diocese of Kribi Dioecesis Kribensis Diocèse de Kribi
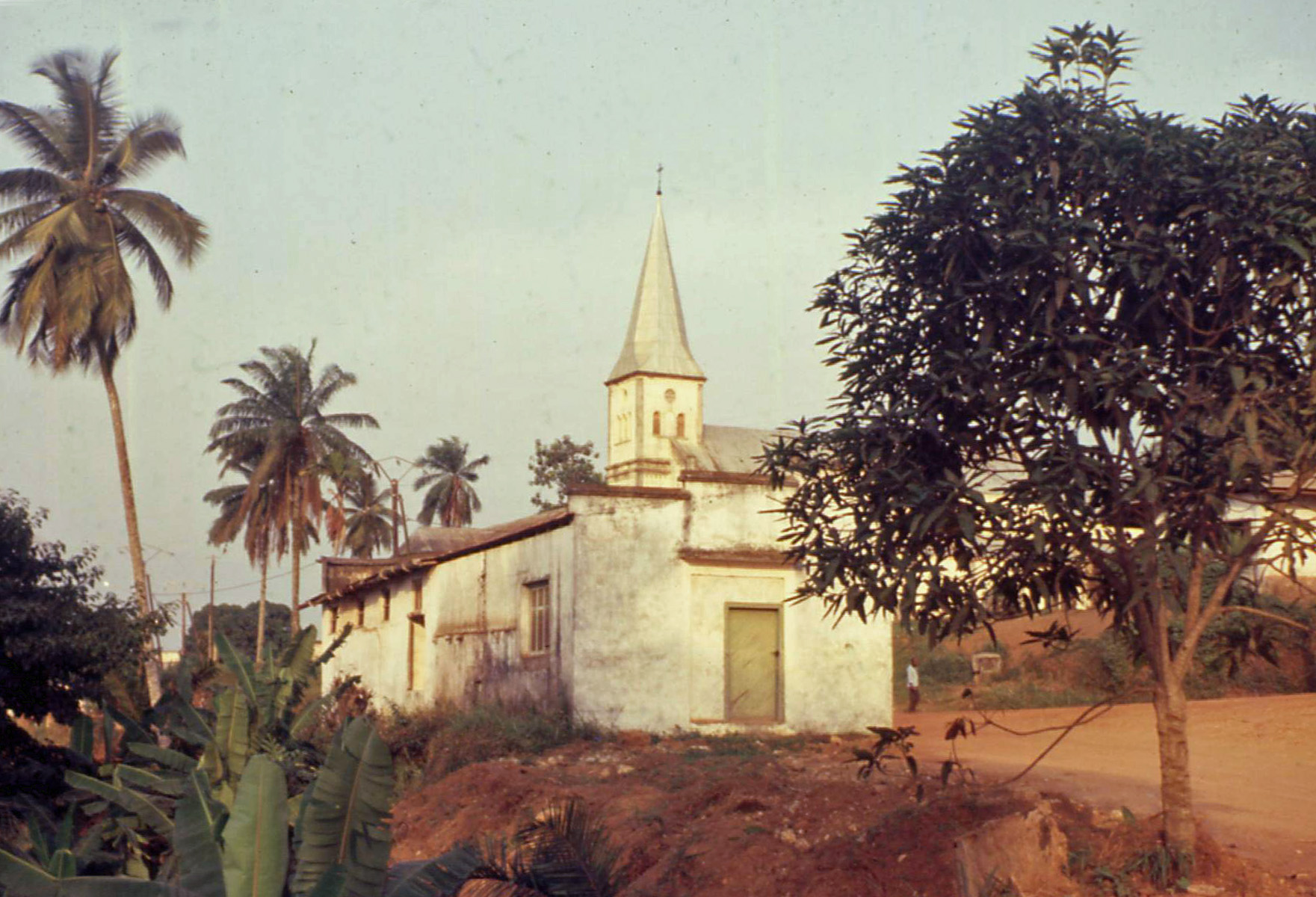
- Church in Kribi, February 1974

Location
- Country: Cameroon
- Metropolitan: Archdiocese of Yaoundé
- Headquarters: Kribi, South Region, Cameroon

Statistics
- Area: 11,208 km^{2} (4,327 sq mi)
- Population: Total; Catholics: (as of 2023); 262,000; 128,400 (49.0%)
- Parishes: 46

Information
- Denomination: Catholic Church
- Sui iuris church: Latin Church
- Rite: Roman Rite
- Established: 19 June 2008; 18 years ago
- Cathedral: Cathédrale Saint-Joseph de Kribi
- Secular priests: 61 (46 Diocesan, 15 Religious Orders)

Current leadership
- Pope: Leo XIV
- Bishop: Damase Zinga Atangana
- Metropolitan Archbishop: Jean Mbarga

The Roman Catholic Diocese of Kribi (Latin: Dioecesis Kribensis) is a diocese located in the city of Kribi in the ecclesiastical province of Yaoundé in Cameroon.

== History ==
- 20 May 1991: Established as Diocese of Ebolowa–Kribi from the Diocese of Sangmélima.
- 19 June 2008: Diocese split to form the Diocese of Ebolowa and the Diocese of Kribi.

== Leadership ==
Bishops of Kribi (Roman rite)

- Joseph Befe Ateba (19 June 2008 – 4 June 2014)
- Damase Zinga Atangana (7 November 2015 – Present)

== See also ==
- Roman Catholicism in Cameroon
