= Adalbert Ndzana =

Cameroonian Roman Catholic prelate (1939–2025)

- Bishop Emeritus of Mbalmayo
- Archdiocese: Yaoundé
- Diocese: Mbalmayo
- Installed: 7 March 1987
- Term ended: 27 December 2016
- Predecessor: Paul Etoga
- Successor: Joseph-Marie Ndi-Okalla

Orders
- Ordination: 15 August 1969
- Consecration: 20 January 1985 by Donato Squicciarini, Jean Zoa, Paul Etoga

Personal details
- Born: 17 July 1939 Zoatoubsi, French Cameroon
- Died: 7 September 2025 (aged 86) Yaoundé, Cameroon

Adalbert Ndzana (17 July 1939 – 7 September 2025) was a Cameroonian Roman Catholic prelate.

Ndzana was born on 17 July 1939 in Zoatoubsi. He was ordained a priest in 1969.

In November 1984, Ndzana was appointed coadjutor bishop of Mbalmayo. He served as Bishop of Mbalmayo from 1987 to 2016.

Ndzana died in Yaoundé on 7 September 2025, at the age of 86.

Catholic Church titles
Preceded by Paul Etoga	Bishop of Mbalmayo; 1987–2016	Succeeded by Joseph-Marie Ndi-Okalla
