= Diocese of Bafia =

Roman Catholic diocese in Cameroon

Coordinates: 4.7498°N 11.2241°E

Diocese of Bafia Dioecesis Bafiensis Diocèse de Bafia

Location
- Country: Cameroon
- Metropolitan: Archdiocese of Yaoundé
- Headquarters: Bafia, Cameroon

Statistics
- Area: 34,615 km^{2} (13,365 sq mi)
- Population: Total; Catholics: (as of 2022); 532,405; 282,220 (53.0%)
- Parishes: 41

Information
- Denomination: Catholic Church
- Sui iuris church: Latin Church
- Rite: Roman Rite
- Established: 6 July 1965; 61 years ago
- Secular priests: 66

Current leadership
- Pope: Leo XIV
- Bishop: Emmanuel Dassi Youfang, Comm. l'Emm.
- Metropolitan Archbishop: Jean Mbarga

The Roman Catholic Diocese of Bafia (Latin: Bafien(sis)) is a diocese located in the city of Bafia in the ecclesiastical province of Yaoundé in Cameroon.

== History ==
- 6 July 1965: Established as Apostolic Prefecture of Bafia from the Metropolitan Archdiocese of Yaoundé
- 1 January 1968: Promoted as Diocese of Bafia

== Ordinaries ==
=== Prefect Apostolic of Bafia (Roman rite) ===
- Father André Charles Lucien Loucheur, C.S.Sp. (14 July 1965 – 11 January 1968); see below

=== Bishops of Bafia (Roman rite) ===
- Bishop André Charles Lucien Loucheur, C.S.Sp. (11 January 1968 – 21 December 1977), resigned; see above
- Bishop Athanase Bala, C.S.Sp. (21 December 1977 – 3 May 2003), retired
- Bishop Jean-Marie Benoît Balla (†) (3 May 2003 – 31 May 2017)
  - Apostolic Administrator Abraham Kome (6 June 2017 – 11 July 2020)
- Bishop Emmanuel Dassi Youfang, Comm. l'Emm. (13 May 2020 – Present)

=== Coadjutor bishop ===
- Athanase Bala, C.S.Sp. (1976-1977)

== See also ==
- Roman Catholicism in Cameroon

== Sources ==
- catholic-hierarchy
- GCatholic.org
