= Emmanuel Dassi Youfang =

Cameroonian Roman Catholic prelate (born 1967)

The Most Reverend Emmanuel Dassi Youfang
- Bishop of Bafia, Cameroon
- Church: Catholic Church
- Archdiocese: Roman Catholic Archdiocese of Douala
- See: Bafia
- Appointed: 13 May 2020
- Installed: 11 July 2020
- Predecessor: Jean-Marie Benoît Balla
- Successor: Incumbent
- Other posts: Auxiliary Bishop of Bafoussam, Cameroon (7 November 2016 - 13 May 2020)

Orders
- Ordination: 16 June 2001
- Consecration: 7 January 2017 by Dieudonné Watio
- Rank: Bishop

Personal details
- Born: Emmanuel Dassi Youfang; 7 August 1967 (age 59) Baham, Diocese of Bafoussam, Cameroon

Styles of Emmanuel Dassi Youfang
- Reference style: Your Lordship; The Most Reverend
- Spoken style: His Lordship
- Religious style: Bishop

Emmanuel Dassi Youfang (born 7 August 1967) is a Cameroonian Roman Catholic prelate who is the Bishop of the Roman Catholic Diocese of Bafia, Cameroon since 2020. Before that, from November 2016 until May 2020 he was Auxiliary Bishop of the Roman Catholic Diocese of Bafoussam, Cameroon. He was appointed bishop by Pope Francis on 7 November 2016. On the same day, he was appointed Titular Bishop of Oescus. He was consecrated and installed bishop at Bafoussam, on 11 July 2020.

== Background and education ==
He was born on 7 August 1967, at Baham, Diocese of Bafoussam, in Cameroon. This is located in the Department of Hauts-Plateaux, in the Western Province of the country.

He studied zoology at the University of Yaoundé in Yaounde. He then entered the Paul VI InterDiocesan Major Seminary in Douala, where he studied philosophy and theology before he was ordained a priest in June 2001. He studied at the Institut Catholique de Paris in 1998, graduating with an advanced degree in Sacramentary Liturgy. He holds a Licentiate in Fundamental Theology, awarded by The Cathedral School and the Bernardins College (French:Ecole Cathédrale-Faculté Notre-Dame), in Paris, France in 2012.

== Priest ==
He became a member of the Emmanuel Community (French:"Communauté de l'Emmanuel") in 1997. On 16 June 2001 he was ordained a priest of Bafoussam, Cameroon. He served in that capacity until 7 November 2016. As a priest, he served in various roles in different locations including as:

- Parish priest and Rector of the Marian Shrine from 2001 until 2009.
- Vicar General of the Diocese of Bafoussam, Cameroon from 2010 until 2012.
- Vicar General of the diocese and Parish priest in Bafoussam Diocese, Cameroon from 2012 until 2016.

== As bishop ==
On 7 No November 2016 Pope Francis appointed Reverend Father Monsignor Emmanuel Dassi Youfang, as Auxiliary Bishop of the Roman Catholic Bishop of Bafoussam. Cameroon. He was concurrently appointed Titular Bishop of Oescus.

He was consecrated and installed at the Cathedral of Saint Joseph, in Bafoussam, Diocese of Bafoussam on 7 January 2017 by the hands of Bishop Dieudonné Watio, Bishop of Bafoussam assisted by Bishop Abraham Boualo Kome Bishop of Bafang and Bishop Yves Le Saux, Bishop of Le Mans.

On 13 May 2020, Pope Francis appointed Bishop Emmanuel Dassi Youfang, Communauté de l'Emmanuel as the new Local Ordinary of the diocese of Bafia in Central Cameroon. He was installed there on 11 July 2020. He succeeded the late Bishop Jean-Marie Benoît Balla, former Bishop of Bafia in Central Cameroon, who died in 2017.

In an interview with pontifical charity Aid to the Church in Need, Bishop Dassi described the Church in his diocese as "vibrant and dynamic", pointing to an abundance of vocations to the priesthood. He also said that the Catholic Church is the only actor in the region which enjoys credibility on all sides of the Anglophone conflict, but that the price to pay for the Church's presence is the risk of kidnappings. He described the ongoing crisis as an "open wound".

== See also ==
- Catholic Church in Cameroon

== Succession table ==
Catholic Church titles
Preceded by	Auxiliary Bishop of Bafoussam, Cameroon (7 November 2016 - 13 May 2020)	Succeeded by
Preceded by Jean-Marie Benoît Balla (3 May 2003 - 31 May 2017)	Bishop of Bafoussam (since 13 May 2020)	Succeeded by Incumbent
