= Jérôme Owono-Mimboe =

- Bishop of Obala
- Church: Catholic Church
- Diocese: Diocese of Obala
- In office: 3 July 1987 – 3 December 2009
- Predecessor: Diocese erected
- Successor: Sosthène Léopold Bayemi Matjei

Orders
- Ordination: 22 July 1962
- Consecration: 6 September 1987 by Jean Zoa

Personal details
- Born: 4 February 1933 Ebolboum (near Ngoulemakong), mandatory Territory of Cameroun, French Empire
- Died: 15 July 2016 (aged 83) Yaoundé, Cameroon

Jérôme Owono-Mimboe (4 February 1933 – 15 July 2016) was a Cameroonian Roman Catholic bishop.

Ordained to the priesthood on 22 July 1962, Owono-Mimboe was named bishop of the Roman Catholic Diocese of Obala, Cameroon on 3 July 1987 and retired 3 December 2009.
