= Gabriel Simo =

Cameroonian Roman Catholic prelate

Gabriel Simo (March 15, 1937 in Bapa, Hauts-Plateaux – November 24, 2017 in Bafoussam) was the Cameroonian Roman Catholic prelate, who served as an auxiliary bishop of the Roman Catholic Archdiocese of Douala (1987–1994) and Roman Catholic Diocese of Bafoussam (1994–2013).

== Life ==
Gabriel Simo was ordained as a priest on March 27, 1966.

Pope John Paul II appointed him an auxiliary bishop of Douala and Titular Bishop of Sereddeli on January 26, 1987. He was consecrated as bishop by Apostolic Pro-Nuncio in Gabon, Cameroon and Equatorial Guinea, Archbishop Donato Squicciarini and other prelates of the Roman Catholic Church on April 26 of the same year.

Because of Simo's origin from the ethnic group of Bamileke it came in the Roman Catholic Archdiocese of Douala to protests of a majority of local priests against his appointment, who criticized a "Bamilekisation" the church hierarchy in Cameroon.

On November 11, 1994, he was appointed an auxiliary bishop in Bafoussam. Pope Francis accepted his age-related retirement on 14 September 2013.
