= Diocese of Sangmélima =

Roman Catholic diocese in Cameroon

Coordinates: 2.9306°N 11.9810°E

Diocese of Sangmélima Dioecesis Sangmelimaensis

Location
- Country: Cameroon
- Episcopal conference: Episcopal Conference of Cameroon
- Ecclesiastical province: Yaoundé

Statistics
- Area: 7,823 sq mi (20,260 km^{2})
- Population: Total; Catholics: (as of 2020); 216,075; 100,864 (46.7%)
- Parishes: 39

Information
- Sui iuris church: Latin Church
- Rite: Roman Rite
- Established: 1963
- Cathedral: Cathédrale Notre-Dame, Sangmélima
- Secular priests: 46

Current leadership
- Pope: Leo XIV
- Bishop: Christophe Zoa

Website
- www.facebook.com/people/Diocèse-de-Sangmélima-officiel/100079961880851

The Roman Catholic Diocese of Sangmélima (Latin: Sangmelimaën(sis)) is a diocese located in the city of Sangmélima in the ecclesiastical province of Yaoundé in Cameroon.

== History ==
On January 18, 1963, it was established as Diocese of Sangmélima from the Diocese of Douala. On May 20, 1991, the Diocese lost territory to the newly-formed Roman Catholic Diocese of Ebolowa-Kribi.

== Leadership ==
- Bishops of Sangmélima (Roman rite), in reverse chronological order:
  - Bishop Christophe Zoa (December 4, 2008 – present), formerly auxiliary bishop of the archdiocese of Yaounde
  - Bishop Raphaël Marie Ze (January 23, 1992 – December 4, 2008)
  - Bishop Jean-Baptiste Ama (July 22, 1983 – May 20, 1991), appointed Bishop of Ebolowa-Kribi
  - Bishop Pierre-Célestin Nkou (January 18, 1963 – May 16, 1983)

== See also ==
- Roman Catholicism in Cameroon
