= Paul Mbiybe Verdzekov =

- Archbishop of Bamenda
- Church: Catholic Church
- Archdiocese: Archdiocese of Bamenda
- In office: 13 August 1970 – 23 January 2006
- Predecessor: Diocese erected
- Successor: Cornelius Fontem Esua

Orders
- Ordination: 20 December 1961
- Consecration: 8 November 1970 by Julius Joseph Willem Peeters

Personal details
- Born: 22 January 1931 Shisong (in southeastern Kumbo), Southern Cameroons, mandatory British Cameroons, British Empire
- Died: 26 January 2010 (aged 79)

Styles of Paul Mbiybe Verdzekov
- Reference style: The Most Reverend
- Spoken style: Your Excellency
- Religious style: Monsignor
- Posthumous style: not applicable

Paul Mbiybe Verdzekov (22 January 1931 – 26 January 2010) was a Cameroonian prelate of the Roman Catholic Church. He served as bishop of Bamenda, Cameroon from 1970 until 1982 and as archbishop from 1982 until 2006.

== Life ==
Born in Shisong on 22 January 1931, Paul Mbiybe Verdzekov was ordained to the priesthood on 20 December 1961.

On 13 August 1970, he was appointed bishop of the newly created diocese of Bamenda. Verdzekov received his episcopal consecration on the following 8 November from Julius Joseph Willem Peeters, bishop of Buéa, with the then bishop of Garoua, Yves-Joseph-Marie Plumey, and the bishop of Sangmélima, Pierre-Célestin Nkou, serving as co-consecrators.

On 18 March 1982 he became archbishop of Bamenda when his diocese was elevated to archdiocese by Pope John Paul II. Archbishop Verdzekov retired on 23 January 2006. He died in 2010, aged 79, as Archbishop Emeritus of Bamenda.

Catholic Church titles
Preceded by Newly created	Bishop of Bamenda; 1970–1982	Succeeded by Elevated to archdiocese
Preceded by Newly created	Archbishop of Bamenda; 1982–2006	Succeeded by Cornelius Fontem Esua
