= Dieudonné Bogmis =

Cameroonian Roman Catholic bishop (1955–2018)

- Bishop of Eséka
- Church: Catholic Church
- Diocese: Diocese of Eséka
- In office: 15 October 2004 – 25 August 2018
- Predecessor: Jean-Bosco Ntep
- Successor: François Achille Eyabi
- Previous posts: Titular Bishop of Gadiaufala (1999-2004); Auxiliary Bishop of Douala (1999-2004)

Orders
- Ordination: 30 June 1983
- Consecration: 10 April 1999 by Christian Tumi

Personal details
- Born: 12 January 1955 Nyanon, Lower Sanaga Region, French Cameroon, French Empire
- Died: 25 August 2018 (aged 63) Eséka, Centre Region, Cameroon

Dieudonné Bogmis (12 January 1955 – 25 August 2018) was a Cameroonian Roman Catholic bishop.

Born in Cameroon, Bogmis was ordained to the priesthood in 1983. He served as auxiliary bishop of the Roman Catholic Archdiocese of Douala, Cameroon and as titular bishop of Gadiaufala from 1999 to 2004. He then served as bishop of the Roman Catholic Diocese of Eséka, Cameroon from 2004 until his death in 2018 due to a stroke.
