= Simon-Victor Tonyé Bakot =

Cameroonian Catholic prelate (born 1947)

The Most Reverend Simon-Victor Tonyé Bakot
- Archbishop Emeritus of Yaoundé, Cameroon
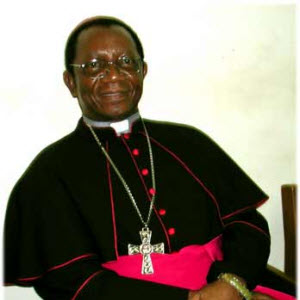
- Archbishop Simon-Victor Tonyé Bakot In 2015
- Church: Catholic Church
- Archdiocese: Catholic Archdiocese of Yaoundé
- See: Yaoundé
- Appointed: 18 October 2003
- Installed: 18 October 2003
- Term ended: 29 July 2013
- Predecessor: André Wouking (27 November 1998 - 10 November 2002)
- Successor: Jean Mbarga (since 31 October 2014)
- Previous posts: Bishop of Sangmélima (22 July 1983 - 20 May 1991); Auxiliary Bishop of Yaounde (12 December 1974 - 22 July 1983)

Orders
- Ordination: 4 June 1955
- Consecration: 2 February 1975 by Jean Zoa
- Rank: Bishop

Personal details
- Born: Simon-Victor Tonyé Bakot; 24 March 1947 Eséka, Centre Region, Cameroon

Styles of Simon-Victor Tonyé Bakot
- Reference style: Your Lordship; The Most Reverend
- Spoken style: His Lordship
- Religious style: Archbishop

Simon-Victor Tonyé Bakot (born 24 March 1947) is a Cameroonian Catholic prelate who served as Archbishop of the Roman Catholic Archdiocese of Yaoundé, in Cameroon from 18 October 2003 until his early resignation on 29 July 2013. Before that, from 22 March 1993 until 18 October 2003, he was the bishop of the Roman Catholic Diocese of Edéa, Cameroon. From 26 January 1987 until 22 March 1993, he served as auxiliary bishop of the Catholic Archdiocese of Douala. He concurrently served as Titular Bishop of Siminina, while auxiliary bishop. He was appointed by Pope John Paul II. He was consecrated by Donato Squicciarini, Titular Archbishop of Tiburnia, on 26 April 1987, at Douala.

The Holy Father transferred him the Catholic Diocese of Edéa, Cameroon on 22 March 1993 and appointed him local ordinary there. He served there until 18 October 2003. On that day, The Holy Father tnsferred him to the Archdiocese of Yaoundé and elevated him to archbishop of that Ecclesiastical Metropolitan Province. His early resignation at age 66 years was accepted by Pope Francis on 29 July 2013. He lives on as the Archbishop Emeritus of Yaoundé, Cameroon.

== Background and education ==
Simon-Victor Tonyé Bakot was born in Eséka, Archdiocese of Yaoundé, Centre Region, in Cameroon. He studied philosophy and theology at seminary before he was ordained priest.

== Priesthood ==
He was ordained a priest for the Archdiocese of Douala on 15 July 1973. He served as a priest until 26 January 1987.

== As bishop ==
On 26 January 1987, Pope John Paul II appointed him Auxiliary Bishop for the Archdiocese of Douala. He was concomitantly assigned as Titular Bishop of Siminina. He was consecrated on 26 April 1987 by Donato Squicciarini, Titular Archbishop of Tiburnia assisted by Simon Tonyé, Archbishop of Douala and André Wouking, Bishop of Bafoussam.

On 22 March 1993, The Holy Father transferred him from Douala to the Roman Catholic Diocese of Edéa, Cameroon and appointed him the local ordinary there. He served in that capacity until 18 October 2003, when he was appointed Archbishop of Yaoundé, Cameroon. While archbishop, he was appointed as a member of the Pontifical Council for Social Communications, by Pope Benedict XVI on 28 November 2006.

On 29 July 2013, Archbishop Simon-Victor Tonyé Bakot resigned from the pastoral care of the Ecclesiastical Metropolitan Province of Yaoundé. Pope Francis accepted that request, despite the bishop being 66 years old at the time. He lives on as Archbishop Emeritus of Yaoundé, Cameroon.

== See also ==
- Catholic Church in Cameroon

== Succession table ==
Catholic Church titles
Preceded by André Wouking (27 November 1998 - 10 November 2002)	Archbishop of Yaoundé (18 October 2003 - 29 July 2013)	Succeeded by Jean Mbarga (since 31 October 2014)
Preceded by None (Diocese created)	Bishop of Edéa (22 March 1993 - 18 October 2003)	Succeeded by Jean-Bosco Ntep (since 15 October 2004)
Preceded by	Auxiliary Bishop of Douala (26 January 1987 - 22 March 1993)	Succeeded by
