= Diocese of Mbalmayo =

Roman Catholic diocese in Cameroon

Coordinates: 3.5159°N 11.5140°E

The Roman Catholic Diocese of Mbalmayo (Latin: Mbalmayoën(sis)) is a diocese located in the city of Mbalmayo in the ecclesiastical province of Yaoundé in Cameroon.

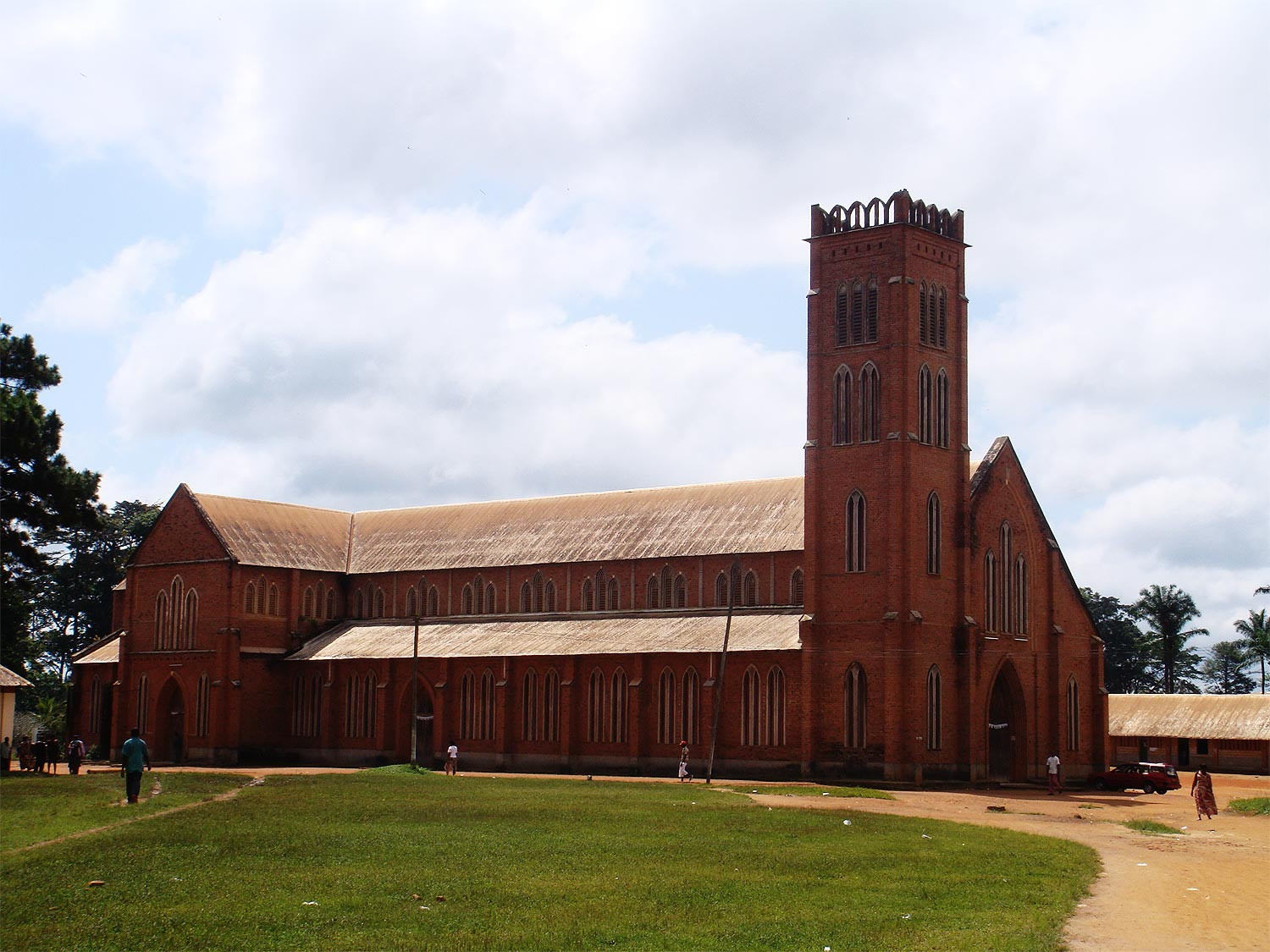
Cathedral in Mbalmayo

== History ==
- June 24, 1961: Established as Diocese of Mbalmayo from Metropolitan Archdiocese of Yaoundé

== Bishops ==
- Bishops of Mbalmayo (Roman rite), in reverse chronological order
  - Bishop Joseph-Marie Ndi-Okalla (since December 27, 2016)
  - Bishop Adalbert Ndzana (March 7, 1987 – December 27, 2016)
  - Bishop Paul Etoga (June 24, 1961 – March 7, 1987)

=== Coadjutor bishop ===
- Adalbert Ndzana (1984-1987)

=== Another priest of this diocese who became bishop ===
- Philippe Alain Mbarga, appointed Bishop of Ebolowa in 2016

== See also ==
- Roman Catholicism in Cameroon
