= Diocese of Ebolowa =

Roman Catholic diocese in Cameroon

Coordinates: 2.4333°N 10.7168°E

Diocese of Ebolowa Dioecesis Ebolouana
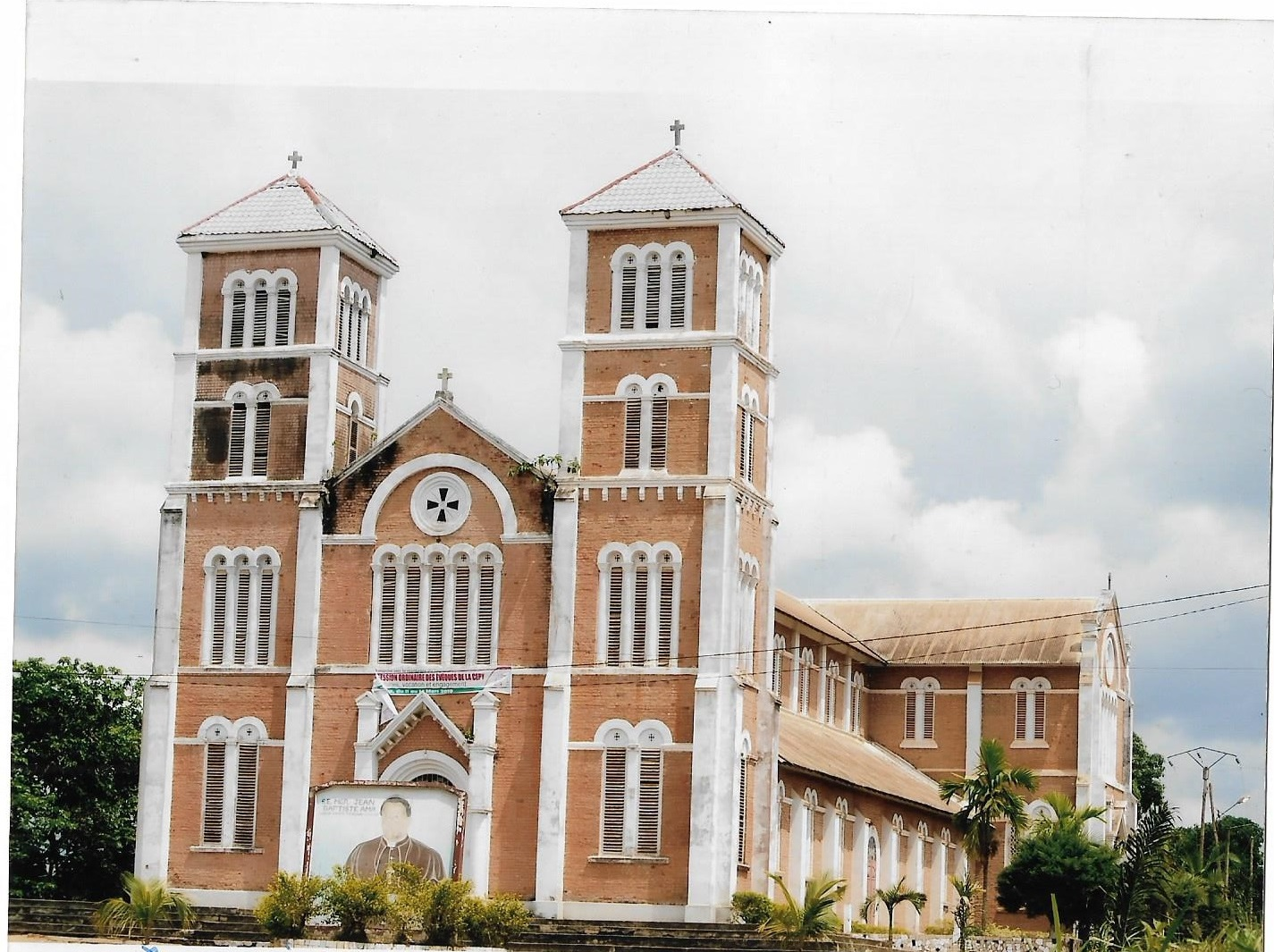
- Cathedral of St. Ann and St. Joachim in Ebolowa

Location
- Country: Cameroon
- Metropolitan: Archdiocese of Yaoundé
- Headquarters: Ebolowa, South Region, Cameroon

Statistics
- Area: 9,970 km^{2} (3,850 sq mi)
- Population: Total; Catholics: (as of 2023); 320,000; 153,000 (47.8%)
- Parishes: 54

Information
- Denomination: Catholic Church
- Sui iuris church: Latin Church
- Rite: Roman Rite
- Established: 20 May 1991; 35 years ago
- Secular priests: 62 (55 Diocesan, 7 Religious Orders)

Current leadership
- Pope: Leo XIV
- Bishop: Philippe Alain Mbarga
- Metropolitan Archbishop: Jean Mbarga

The Roman Catholic Diocese of Ebolowa (Latin: Ebolouanus) is a diocese located in the city of Ebolowa in the ecclesiastical province of Yaoundé in Cameroon.

== History ==
- 20 May 1991: Established as Diocese of Ebolowa–Kribi from the Diocese of Sangmélima.
- 19 June 2008: Diocese was split to form the Diocese of Ebolowa and the Diocese of Kribi.

== Leadership ==
Bishops of Ebolowa–Kribi (Roman rite)

- Jean-Baptiste Ama (20 May 1991 – 15 March 2002), retired
- Jean Mbarga (15 October 2004 – 19 June 2008 see below)

Bishops of Ebolowa (Roman rite)

- Jean Mbarga (see above 19 June 2008 – 31 October 2014), appointed Archbishop of Yaoundé
- Philippe Alain Mbarga (22 October 2016 – Present)

== See also ==
- Catholic Church in Cameroon

== Sources ==
- GCatholic.org
