= Diocese of Edéa =

Roman Catholic diocese in Cameroon

Diocese of Edéa Dioecesis Edeana
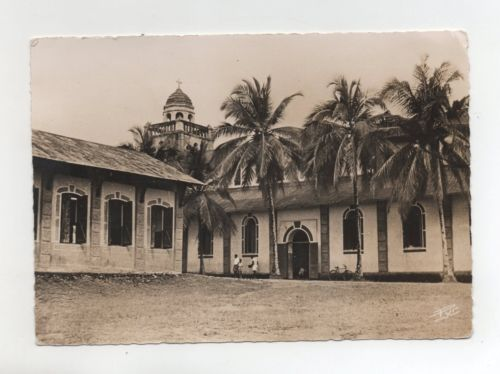
- Mission d'Édéa, in the Edéa diocese

Location
- Country: Cameroon
- Metropolitan: Douala
- Coordinates: 4.1017°N 10.6000°E

Statistics
- Area: 10,500 km^{2} (4,100 sq mi)
- Population: Total; Catholics: (as of 2023); 305,000; 185,368 (60.8%)

Information
- Denomination: Roman Catholic
- Rite: Roman (Latin)
- Established: 22 March 1993
- Archdiocese: Douala

Current leadership
- Bishop: sede vacante
- Bishops emeritus: Jean-Bosco Ntep

The Roman Catholic Diocese of Edéa (Latin: Dioecesis Edeana) is a diocese located in the city of Edéa in the ecclesiastical province of Douala in Cameroon. It was established on 22 March 1993.

== Leadership ==
Bishops of Edéa (Roman rite), in reverse chronological order:

- Bishop Jean-Bosco Ntep (15 October 2004 – 4 June 2026)
- Bishop Simon-Victor Tonyé Bakot (22 March 1993 – 18 October 2003), appointed Archbishop of Yaoundé

== See also ==
- Roman Catholicism in Cameroon
