= Raphaël Marie Ze =

Cameroonian Roman catholic bishop

- Bishop of Sangmélima
- Church: Catholic Church
- Diocese: Diocese of Sangmélima
- In office: 23 January 1992 – 4 December 2008
- Predecessor: Jean-Baptiste Ama
- Successor: Christophe Zoa

Orders
- Ordination: 29 April 1962
- Consecration: 25 April 1992 by Santos Abril y Castelló

Personal details
- Born: 4 November 1932 Alangana (near Akonolinga), mandatory Territory of Cameroun, French Empire
- Died: 6 September 2011 (aged 78) Yaoundé, Cameroon

Raphaël Marie Ze (4 November 1932, in Alangana – 6 September 2011, in Yaoundé) was the Roman Catholic bishop of the Diocese of Sangmélima, Cameroon. Ordained to the priesthood in 1962, Ze became bishop of the Sangmélima in 1997 and retired in 2008.

== Career ==
Ze was ordained as a priest on 29 April 1962. In May 1991 he was appointed Bishop of the diocese of Ebolowa-Kribi covering the departments of Mvila and Ntem Valley. The next year, he was appointed Bishop of Sangmélima, Cameroon, with the ordination taking place on 25 April 1992.

Under his leadership, the Diocese of Sangmélima increased the number of parishes from 12 to 21, divided into four pastoral areas: Akon, Djoum, Nkol-Ekong and Ndene. Ze was also Apostolic Administrator of the Diocese of Kribi-Ebolowa from 15 March 2002 to October 2004.

He retired as Bishop on 4 December 2008.
