= Sosthène Léopold Bayemi Matjei =

Cameroonian Roman catholic bishop

- Bishop of Obala
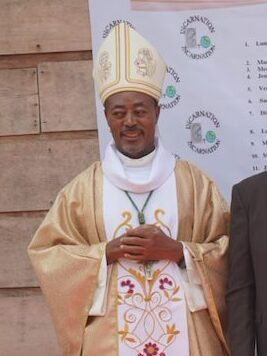
- Sosthène Léopold Bayemi Matjei in 2024
- Church: Catholic Church
- Diocese: Diocese of Obala
- Appointed: 3 December 2009
- Predecessor: Jérôme Owono-Mimboe

Orders
- Ordination: 12 February 1994
- Consecration: 2 February 2010 by Simon-Victor Tonyé Bakot

Personal details
- Born: 26 December 1964 (age 61) Matomb, East Cameroon, Federal Republic of Cameroon

Sosthène Léopold Bayemi Matjei (born 26 December 1964) is a Cameroonian Roman Catholic bishop.

== Biography ==
Ordained to the priesthood in 1994, Bayemi Matjei was named bishop of the Roman Catholic Diocese of Obala, Cameroon on 3 December 2009.

Bishop Sosthène Léopold BAYEMI MATJEI was born on 26 December 1964 at Matomb, Nyong and Kelle Division, Centre Region. He began his ministerial formation in ‘Saint Thomas Aquinas’ Major Seminary Bambui-Bamenda in 1986 and finished it at the Paul VIth Provincial Major Seminary of Nkongbodol-Douala. On 12 February 1994, he was ordained priest by Monsignor Jean-Bosco Ntep in Our Lady of Fatima Cathedral in Eséka for the diocese of Eséka. Ministries After priestly ordination, father Bayémi was named Parish Priest of the Saint Paul Parish of Ngog-Mapubi, in the same Diocese, and Coordinator of the Diocesan Committee of Social Welfare (CODASC).

From 1996 to 2000, he went for further studies in philosophy in the Pontifical University Urbaniana in Rome and obtained a Doctorate in Philosophy. From 2000 to 2001, he studied the Pedagogy of the ministerial formational ways in Salesian Pontifical University Papal in Rome. In 2001, he came back to Cameroon and he appointed Vicar General of the Diocese of Eséka and Parish Priest of ‘Christ Ressucité’ Parish at Eséka 2. Since 2004 he is, at the same time: Attaché to the Apostolic Nunciature of Yaoundé, Teacher in the Faculty of Philosophy of Catholic University of Central Africa and Assistant Priest at Saint Vincent Palloti parish of nlongkak. Thursday 3 December 2009, Pope Benedict XVIth nominated him Bishop of Obala, Cameroon. In replacement of Mgr Owono Mimboe who have submitted his request for retirement after reaching 75 years old. Mgr Owono Mimboe was appointed as first bishop of Obala diocese in 1987.

On Tuesday 27 December 2016, Pope Francis appointed priest Joseph-Marie Ndi-Okalla as new bishop of Mbalmayo diocese.
