= Jean Mbarga =

Cameroonian Catholic prelate (born 1956)

The Most Reverend Jean Mbarga
- Archbishop of Yaoundé, Cameroon
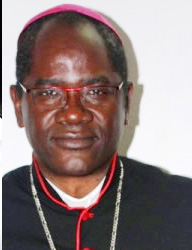
- Archbishop Jean Mbarga
- Church: Catholic Church
- Archdiocese: Roman Catholic Archdiocese of Yaoundé
- See: Catholic Diocese of Yaoundé
- Appointed: 31 October 2014
- Installed: 31 October 2014
- Predecessor: Simon-Victor Tonyé Bakot (18 October 2003 - 29 July 2013)
- Successor: Incumbent
- Other posts: Apostolic Administrator of the Archdiocese of Yaoundé (29 July 2013 - 31 October 2014); Bishop of the Diocese of Ebolowa (15 October 2004 - 31 October 2014)

Orders
- Ordination: 5 December 1981 by Jean Zoa
- Consecration: 5 December 2004 by Eliseo Antonio Ariotti
- Rank: Archbishop

Personal details
- Born: Jean Mbarga; 18 May 1956 (age 69) Ebolmedzo, Centre Region, Archdiocese of Yaounde, Cameroon
- Motto: "J'aime le Christ et je bâtis son Eglise" (I love Christ and I am building his Church)

Styles of Jean Mbarga
- Reference style: Your Lordship; The Most Reverend
- Spoken style: His Lordship
- Religious style: Bishop

Jean Mbarga (born 18 May 1956) is a Cameroonian Catholic prelate who serves as the archbishop of the Roman Catholic Archdiocese of Yaoundé, in Cameroon since 31 October 2014. Before that, from 15 October 2004 until 31 October 2014, he served as the Bishop of the Roman Catholic Diocese of Ebolowa, Cameroon. Pope John Paul II appointed him bishop. He was consecrated on 5 December 2004 by Eliseo Antonio Ariotti, Titular Archbishop of Vibiana. While bishop at Ebolowa, he served as apostolic administrator at Yaoundé from 29 July 2013 until 31 October 2014. On 31 October 2014, Pope Francis transferred him to Yaoundé and elevated him to Metropolitan Provincial Archbishop there.

== Background and education ==
Jean Mbarga was born on 18 May 1956 at Ebolmedzo, in the Archdiocese of Yaoundé, in Cameroon. He studied at the Nkolbisson Major Seminary, in Yaoundé. He continued with his priestly studies at an institution in Strasbourg, France. Later he graduated with a Doctorate in moral theology, specialising in Bio-ethics, from the Pontifical Alphonsian Academy in Rome, Italy.

== Priest ==
He was ordained a priest for the archdiocese of Yaoundé on 5 December 1981 by Jean Zoa, Archbishop of Yaoundé. He served as a priest until 15 October 2004. While a priest, he served in various roles and locations, including:

- Assistant priest from 1982 until 1983.
- Diocesan and national chaplain for Lay Apostolate from 1984 until 1985.
- Studies in Rome, Italy leading to graduation with a doctorate in moral theology from the Pontifical Alphonsian Academy from 1985 until 1992.
- Rector of the Nkolbisson Major Seminary in Yaoundé from 1992 until 2002.
- Diocesan bursar for the Archdiocese of Yaoundé from 2002 until 2003.
- Vicar general for the Archdiocese of Yaoundé during 2004.
- Consultor of the Pontifical Councils for Culture from 1998 until 2004.
- Consultor of the Pontifical Councils for the Laity from 2001 until 2004.

== Bishop ==
On 15 October 2004, Pope John Paul II appointed Reverend Father Jean Mbarga, previously the Vicar general of the archdiocese of Yaounde, Cameroon as the new bishop of the Diocese of Ebolowa, Cameroon. He was consecrated by Eliseo Antonio Ariotti, Titular Archbishop of Vibiana, on 5 December 2004. The Principal Co-Consecrators were Simon-Victor Tonyé Bakot, Archbishop of Yaoundé and Raphaël Marie Ze, Bishop of Sangmélima. While bishop at Ebolowa, he served as apostolic administrator at Yaoundé, from 29 July 2013 until 31 October 2014. On that day, Pope Francis transferred him from Ebolowa to Yaoundé and appointed him archbishop there.

== See also ==
- Catholic Church in Cameroon

== Succession table ==
Catholic Church titles
Preceded by Simon-Victor Tonyé Bakot (18 October 2003 - 29 July 2013)	Archbishop of Yaoundé (since31 Oct 2014)	Succeeded by Incumbent
Preceded by Jean-Baptiste Ama (20 May 1991 - 15 March 2002)	Bishop of Ebolowa (15 October 2004 - 31 October 2014)	Succeeded by Philippe Alain Mbarga (since 22 October 2016)
