= Lobo, Cameroon =

Coordinates: 3.8918°N 11.2302°E

- Commune and town
- Interactive map of Lobo, Cameroon
- Country: Cameroon
- Time zone: UTC+1 (WAT)

Lobo, Cameroon is a town and commune in Cameroon.

== See also ==
- Communes of Cameroon
