= Paul Etoga =

Cameroonian Catholic prelate (born 1911)

The Most Reverend Paul Etoga
- Bishop Emeritus of Mbalmayo, Cameroon (Deceased)
- Church: Catholic Church
- Archdiocese: Roman Catholic Archdiocese of Yaoundé
- See: Diocese of Mbalmayo
- Appointed: 24 June 1961
- Installed: 24 June 1961
- Term ended: 7 March 1987
- Predecessor: None (Diocese created)
- Successor: Adalbert Ndzana (7 March 1987 - 27 December 2016)
- Other posts: Auxiliary Bishop of the Archdiocese of Yaoundé (3 July 1955 - 24 June 1961)

Orders
- Ordination: 19 September 1939
- Consecration: 30 November 1955 by René Marie Graffin
- Rank: Bishop

Personal details
- Born: Paul Etoga; 1 January 1911 Nkolmewrut, Centre Region, Archdiocese of Yaounde, Cameroon
- Died: 13 March 1998 (aged 87) Yaoundé, Cameroon

Styles of Paul Etoga
- Reference style: Your Lordship; The Most Reverend
- Spoken style: His Lordship
- Religious style: Bishop

Paul Etoga (1911 - 1998) was a Cameroonian Catholic prelate who served as the bishop of the Roman Catholic Diocese of Mbalmayo, in Cameroon from 24 June 1961 until his age-related retirement on 7 March 1987. Before that, from 3 July 1955 until 24 June 1961, he served as auxiliary bishop of the Roman Catholic Archdiocese of Yaoundé, Cameroon. He was appointed bishop by Pope Pius XII and contemporanueously assigned as Titular Bishop of Cyparissia. He was consecrated on 30 November 1955 by René Marie Graffin, Archbishop of Yaoundé.

On 24 June 1961, Pope John XXIII created the Catholic Diocese of Mbalmayo, a suffragan of the Ecclesiastical Metropolitan Province of Yaoundé. The Holy Father appointed Bishop Paul Etoga to be the pioneer bishop for the new Catholic See. On 7 March 1987, Pope John Paul II accepted the resignation from the pastoral care of the Diocese of Mbalmayo, Cameroon submitted by Bishop Paul Etoga. He was succeeded that same day by Adalbert Ndzana, previously the Coadjutor Bishop at Mbalmayo. Bishop Paul Etoga died on 13 March 1998, while Bishop Emeritus of Mbalmayo.

== Background and education ==
Paul Etoga was born in 1911 in Nkolmewrut, Centre Region, Archdiocese of Yaounde, in Cameroon. He studied philosophy and theology at seminary, before he was ordained a priest.

He studied at the Mvolyé Catholic School, starting in 1923, where he completed his primary education. He was baptized on 20 January 1924. In 1927, he entered the Minor seminary which was initially located at Mvolyé but was later relocated to Nlong and still later to Akono. Paul Etoga entered the Major Seminary, graduating in 1939.

== Priest ==
He was ordained a priest for the Archdiocese of Yaoundé, Cameroon on 19 September 1939. He served as a priest until 3 July 1955.

== Bishop ==
On 3 July 1955, Pope Pius XII appointed him auxiliary bishop of the Archdiocese of Yaounde and concurrently assigned him Titular Bishop of Cyparissia. His episcopal consecration took place at Yaoundé on 30 November 1955. The Principal Consecratorɦ was René Marie Graffin, Archbishop of Yaoundé assisted by Michel-Jules-Joseph-Marie Bernard, Archbishop of Brazzaville and Pierre Marie Alphonse Bonneau, Bishop of Douala. He was the first Black Cameroonian to be consecrated a Catholic bishop. He was also the first native sub-Saharan African in Francophone Africa to be consecrated a Catholic bishop.

On 24 June 1961, Pope John XXIII erected the Roman Catholic Diocese of Mbalmayo, Cameroon and made it a suffragan of the Archdiocese of Yaoundé. The Holy Father appointed Bishop Paul Etoga, previously auxiliary bishop at Yaoundé, as the pioneer bishop at Mbalmayo. He is reported to have attended the Second Vatican Council, Session One, Session Two, Session Three and Session Four, from 1962 until 1965. On 7 March 1987, Pope John Paul II accepted the age-related resignation from the pastoral care of the Diocese of Mbalmayo, that Bishop Paul Etoga submitted. That same day, Bishop Adalbert Ndzana, previously the Coadjutor Bishop at Mbalmayo succeeded there. Bishop Paul Etoga died on 13 March 1998, in Yaoundé, Cameroon.

== See also ==
- Catholic Church in Cameroon

== Succession table ==
Catholic Church titles
| Preceded by None (Diocese created) | Bishop of Mbalmayo (24 June 1961 - 7 March 1987) | Succeeded by Adalbert Ndzana (7 March 1987 - 27 December 2016) |
| Preceded by | Auxiliary Bishop of Yaoundé (3 July 1955 - 24 June 1961) | Succeeded by |
