= Joseph Befe Ateba =

Cameroonian Roman Catholic bishop

His Excellency Joseph Befe Ateba
- Bishop of Kribi
- Church: Roman Catholic Church
- Diocese: Roman Catholic Diocese of Kribi
- Appointed: 2008
- Term ended: June 4, 2014
- Predecessor: Diocese established

Orders
- Ordination: 1987

Personal details
- Born: April 25, 1962
- Died: June 4, 2014 (aged 52)

Joseph Befe Ateba (April 25, 1962 – June 4, 2014) was a Roman Catholic bishop.

Ordained to the priesthood in 1987, Ateba was appointed the first bishop of the Roman Catholic Diocese of Kribi, Cameroon, in 2008. He died while still in office.
