= Pierre-Célestin Nkou =

Cameroonian Roman Catholic bishop

- Bishop of Sangmélima
- Church: Catholic Church
- Diocese: Diocese of Sangmélima
- In office: 18 January 1963 – 16 May 1983
- Predecessor: Diocese erected
- Successor: Jean-Baptiste Ama

Orders
- Ordination: 15 April 1956
- Consecration: 2 June 1963 by Sergio Pignedoli

Personal details
- Born: 8 November 1927 Edéa, mandatory Territory of Cameroun, French Empire
- Died: 16 May 1983 (aged 55) Rome, Italy

Pierre-Célestin Nkou (8 November 1927 − 16 May 1983) was a Cameroonian Catholic bishop.

Ordained to the priesthood in 1956, Nkou was named bishop of the Diocese of Sangmélima, Cameroon in 1963 and died in 1983 while still in office.
