= Our Lady of Victories Cathedral, Yaoundé =

Coordinates: 3.8629°N 11.5210°E

Our Lady of Victories Cathedral
- Cathédrale Notre-Dame-des-Victoires de Yaoundé
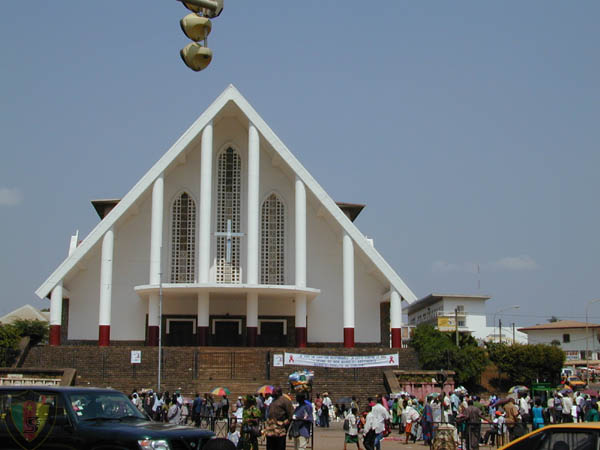
- Our Lady of Victories Cathedral
- Location: Yaoundé
- Country: Cameroon
- Denomination: Roman Catholic Church

The Our Lady of Victories Cathedral (French: Cathédrale Notre-Dame-des-Victoires de Yaoundé) is a religious building belonging to the Catholic Church and serves as the cathedral of the metropolitan archdiocese of Yaoundé (Archidioecesis Yaundensis or L'archidiocèse métropolitain de Yaoundé) in Cameroon. It is located in the center of the city in the rotunda of the central post office.

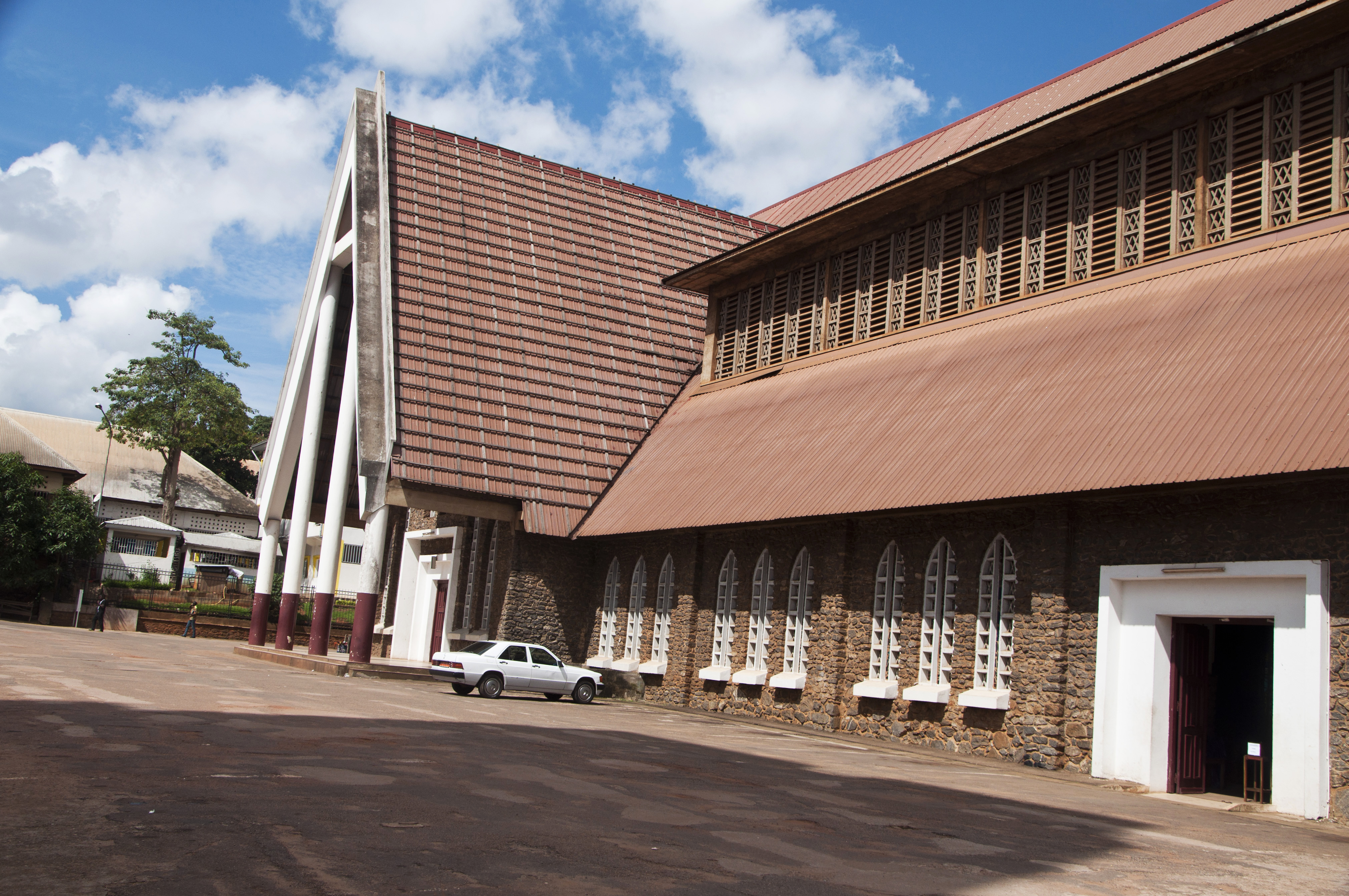
Side view of Our Lady of Victories Cathedral, Yaounde

It has a stunning architecture, and a large number of seats, with space for around 5,000 worshippers, and an interior cross-shaped. After more than 50 years of existence, the construction of the Cathedral of Our Lady of Victories in Yaounde is not over yet. This is one of the most significant places in the capital, and was consecrated in 1955.

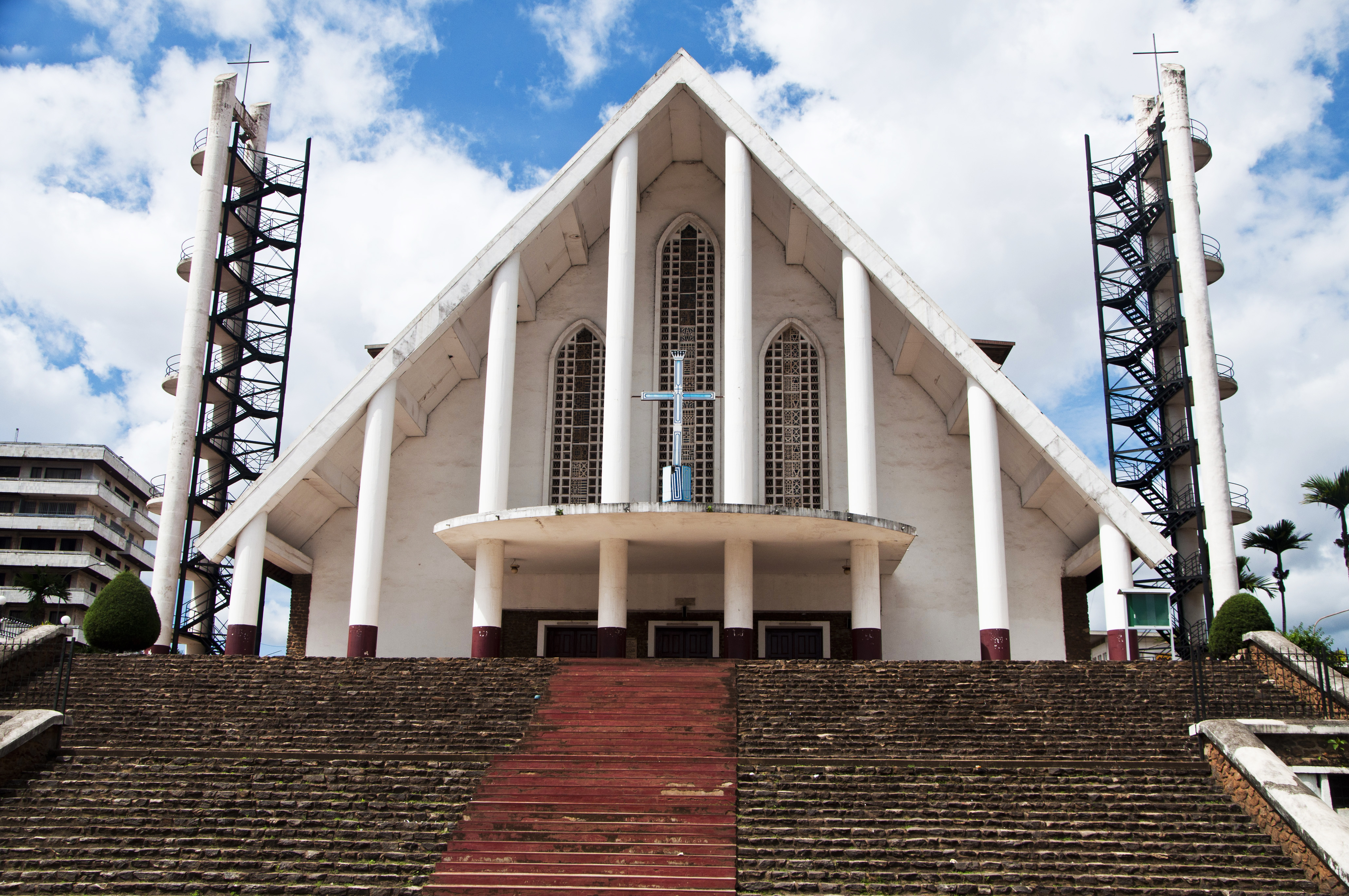
Front view of Our Lady of Victories Cathedral, Yaounde

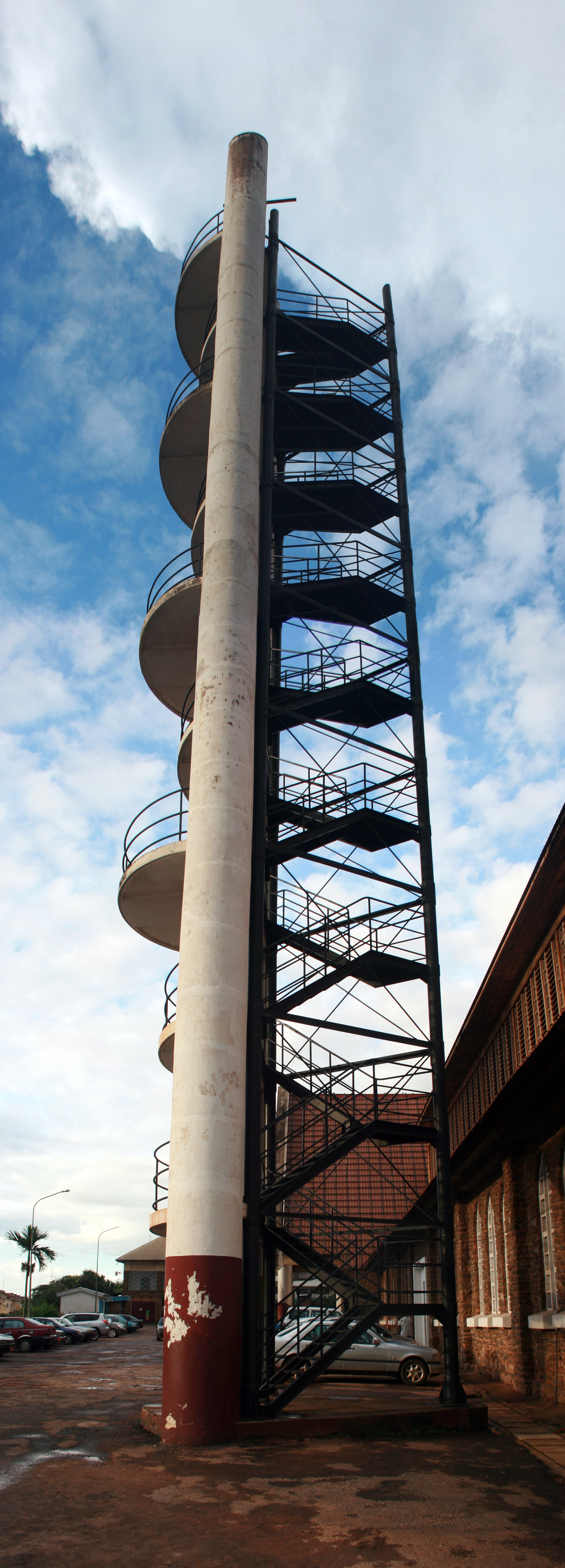
Cathedral bell tower

== See also ==
- Roman Catholicism in Cameroon
