= Diocese of Bafang =

Roman Catholic diocese in Cameroon

The Roman Catholic Diocese of Bafang is a Latin Catholic suffragan diocese in the ecclesiastical province of Douala in Cameroon.

Though it is a suffragan diocese, it depends on the missionary Roman Congregation for the Evangelization of Peoples.

Its episcopal seat is the Cathédrale du Cœur-Immaculé de Marie, a cathedral dedicated to the Immaculate Heart of Mary, in Bafang, in the Haut-Nkam department of the West Province, Cameroon.

== Statistics ==
As per 2014, it pastorally serves 124,193 Catholics (42.5% of 292,387 total) on 7,229 km^{2} in 25 parishes and 91 missions. It had 34 priests (diocesan), 11 lay religious (sisters) and 12 seminarians.

== History ==
The diocese was established on 26 May 2012 without a formal missionary stage as the Diocese of Bafang on territory was split off from the Diocese of Nkongsamba, located in the same province.

== Ordinaries ==
Its first and only incumbent is:

- Abraham Kome (from 26 May 2012), born 2 July 1969 in Cameroon, ordained a priest on 11 December 1999, consecrated Bishop on 15 July 2012.

== External links and sources ==
- GCatholic
