= Pouma =

Coordinates: 3°51′N 10°31′E

- Commune and town
- Interactive map of Pouma
- Country: Cameroon
- Time zone: UTC+1 (WAT)

Pouma is a town and commune in Cameroon.

== See also ==
- Communes of Cameroon
