= Archdiocese of Yaoundé =

Roman Catholic archdiocese in Cameroon

Coordinates: 3.8633°N 11.5209°E

Archdiocese of Yaoundé Archidioecesis Yaundensis Archidiocèse de Yaoundé

Location
- Country: Cameroon
- Headquarters: Yaoundé, Cameroon

Statistics
- Area: 4,964 km^{2} (1,917 sq mi)
- Population: Total; Catholics: (as of 2023); 3,227,830; 1,506,620 (46.7%)
- Parishes: 187

Information
- Denomination: Catholic Church
- Sui iuris church: Latin Church
- Rite: Roman Rite
- Established: 18 March 1890; 136 years ago
- Cathedral: Our Lady of Victories Cathedral, Yaoundé
- Secular priests: 732

Current leadership
- Pope: Leo XIV
- Metropolitan Archbishop: Jean Mbarga
- Bishops emeritus: Simon-Victor Tonyé Bakot

The Roman Catholic Archdiocese of Yaoundé (Latin: Yaunden(sis)) is the Metropolitan See for the ecclesiastical province of Yaoundé in Cameroon.

== History ==
- 18 March 1890: Established as Apostolic Prefecture of Cameroun from the Apostolic Vicariate of Two Guineas in Gabon
- 2 January 1905: Promoted as Apostolic Vicariate of Cameroun
- 3 April 1931: Renamed as Apostolic Vicariate of Yaoundé
- 14 September 1955: Promoted as Metropolitan Archdiocese of Yaoundé

== Special churches ==
The seat of the metropolitan archbishop is the Cathédrale Notre Dame des Victoires in Yaoundé. There is also a Minor Basilica at Mary Queen of the Apostles Basilica in Yaoundé.

== Bishops ==
=== Ordinaries, in reverse chronological order ===
- Metropolitan Archbishops of Yaoundé (Roman rite), below
  - Archbishop Jean Mbarga (31 Oct 2014 – Present)
    - Apostolic Administrator Jean Mbarga (29 Jul 2013 – 31 Oct 2014)
  - Archbishop Simon-Victor Tonyé Bakot (18 Oct 2003 – 29 Jul 2013), resigned
  - Archbishop André Wouking (27 Nov 1998 – 10 Nov 2002)
  - Archbishop Jean Zoa (11 Sep 1961 – 20 Mar 1998)
  - Archbishop René Graffin, C.S.Sp. (14 Sep 1955 – 6 Sep 1961), resigned; see below
- Vicars Apostolic of Yaoundé (Roman rite), below
  - Bishop René Graffin, C.S.Sp. (4 Mar 1943 – 14 Sep 1955); see above
  - Bishop François-Xavier Vogt, C.S.Sp. (3 Apr 1931 – 4 Mar 1943); see below
- Vicars Apostolic of Cameroun (Roman rite), below
  - Bishop François-Xavier Vogt, C.S.Sp. (19 May 1923 – 3 Apr 1931); see above
    - Apostolic Administrator François-Xavier Vogt, C.S.Sp. (6 May 1922 – 19 May 1923)
  - Bishop Franziskus Hennemann, S.A.C. (7 Nov 1914 – 21 Jun 1922), appointed Prefect of Cape of Good Hope, Central District, South Africa
  - Bishop Heinrich Vieter, S.A.C. (2 Jan 1905 – 7 Nov 1914); see below
- Prefect Apostolic of Cameroun (Roman rite), below
  - Father Heinrich Vieter, S.A.C. (18 Mar 1890 – 2 Jan 1905); see above

=== Coadjutor vicars apostolic ===
- Franziskus Xaver Hennemann, S.A.C. (1913-1914)
- René Marie Graffin, C.S.Sp. (1931-1943)

=== Auxiliary bishops ===
- Paul Etoga (1955-1961), appointed Bishop of Mbalmayo
- Jean-Baptiste Ama (1974-1983), appointed Bishop of Sangmélima
- Christophe Zoa (2006-2008), appointed Bishop of Sangmélima

=== Other priests of this diocese who became bishops ===
- Jean-Marie Benoît Balla, appointed Bishop of Bafia in 2003
- Joseph Befe Ateba, appointed Bishop of Kribi in 2008
- Dieudonné Espoir Atangana (priest here, 1986-1987), appointed Bishop of Nkongsamba in 2012

== Suffragan Dioceses ==
- Bafia
- Ebolowa
- Kribi
- Mbalmayo
- Obala
- Sangmélima

== See also ==
- Roman Catholicism in Cameroon

== Sources ==
- GCatholic.org
