= Catholic University of Central Africa =

Private university in Cameroon

- Université Catholique d'Afrique Centrale (French)
- Type: Private
- Established: 1989; 37 years ago
- Affiliations: Roman Catholic
- Location: Yaoundé, Cameroon; 3.844°N 11.521°E
- Campus: Urban
- Nickname: CUAC or UCAC
- Website: University website

The Catholic University of Central Africa (Université Catholique de l'Afrique Centrale) (CUAC or UCAC) is a private Roman Catholic university in Yaoundé, Cameroon.

== History ==
CUAC was founded in 1989 by the Association of the Episcopal Conference of the Central African Region. It opened in 1991 with 111 students. The university has three campuses around Yaoundé, two in the center of town with the main campus outside of the city. In 2003, Citigroup donated US$20,000 to CUAC, which funded 10 scholarships.

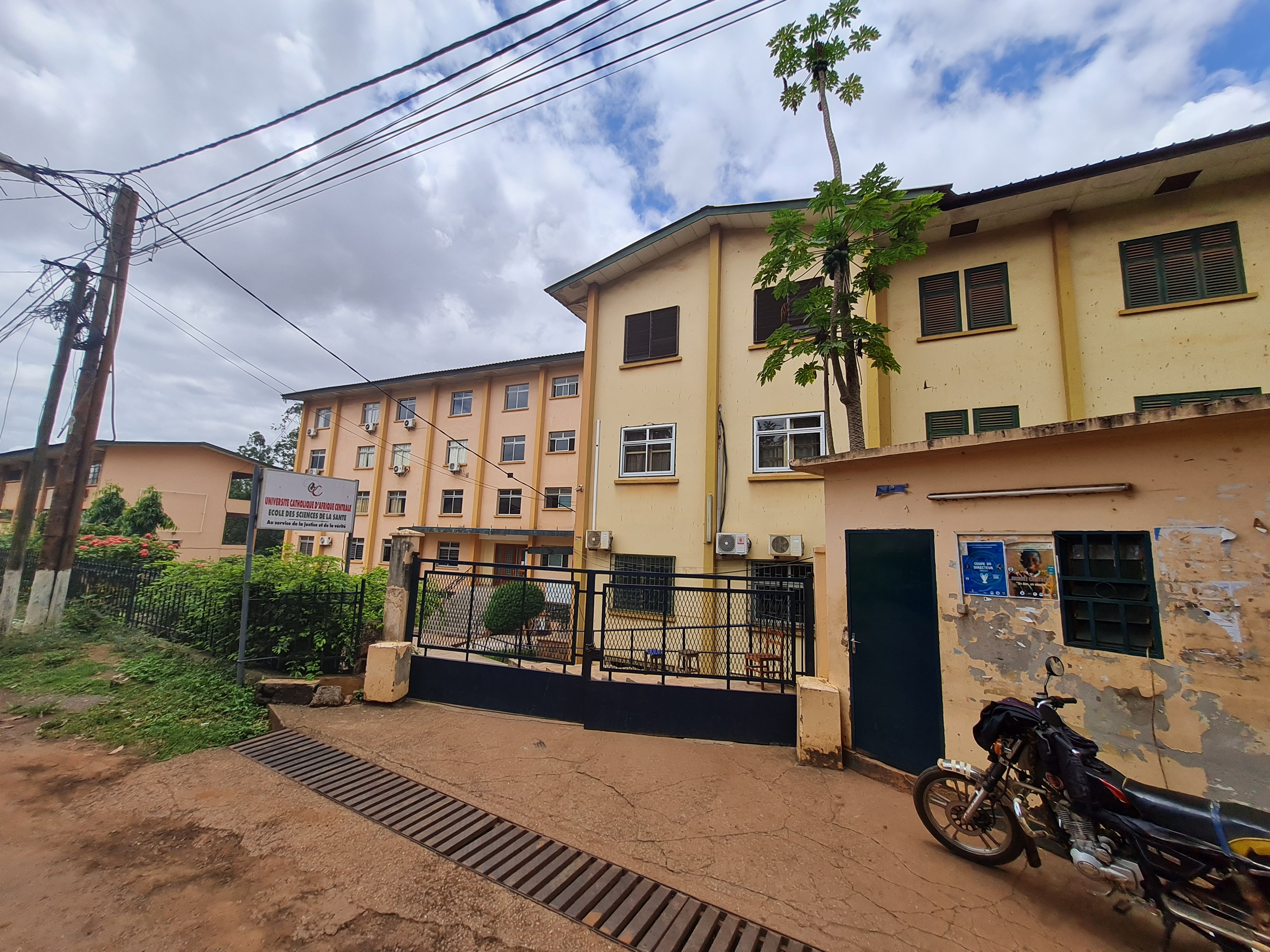
Catholic University of Central Africa in Yaoundé, Cameroon

== Faculties ==
CUAC has five faculties:

- Faculty of Theology
- Faculty of Philosophy
- Faculty of Social Sciences and Management
- The Canon Law Department
- The Advanced School of Nursing
- School of Engineering and Technology
- School of Health Sciences
