= Jean Zoa =

Cameroonian Catholic prelate (1924 - 1996

The Most Reverend Jean Zoa
- Archdishop of Yaoundé, Cameroon (Deceased)
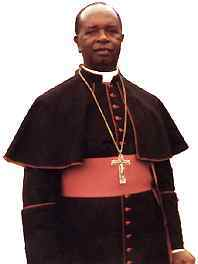
- Archbishop Jean Zoa
- Church: Catholic Church
- Archdiocese: Roman Catholic Archdiocese of Yaoundé
- See: Yaoundé
- Appointed: 11 September 1961
- Installed: 21 December 1961
- Term ended: 20 March 1998
- Predecessor: René Marie Graffin (4 March 1943 - 6 September 1961)
- Successor: André Wouking (27 November 1998 - 10 November 2002)

Orders
- Ordination: 3 October 1950
- Consecration: 21 December 1961 by Cardinal Grégoire-Pierre XV Agagianian
- Rank: Archbishop

Personal details
- Born: Jean Zoa; 1 January 1924 Saa, Archdiocese of Yaoundé, Centre Region, Cameroon
- Died: 20 March 1998 (aged 74) Yaounde, Cameroon

Styles of Jean Zoa
- Reference style: His Grace; The Right Reverend
- Spoken style: Your Grace
- Religious style: Bishop

Jean Zoa (1924 - 1998) was a Cameroonian Catholic prelate who served as the archbishop of the Roman Catholic Archdiocese of Yaoundé in Cameroon from 11 September 1961 until his death on 20 March 1998. Before that, from 3 October 1950 until 11 September 1961, he served as a priest of the same Catholic See. He was appointed by Pope John XXIII. He was consecrated on 21 December 1961, in Rome, Italy by Cardinal Grégoire-Pierre XV Agagianian, Patriarch of Cilicia (Armenian). Archbishop Jean Zoa died in office on 20 March 1998.

== Background and education ==
He was born in Saa, Archdiocese of Yaoundé, Centre Region, in Cameroon, in 1924.

== Priest ==
He was ordained a priest for the Archdiocese of Yaoundé, Cameroon on 3 October 1950. He served as a priest until 11 September 1961.

== Bishop ==
He was appointed Archbishop of the Ecclesiastical Metropolitan Province of Yaoundé by Pope John XXIII on 11 September 1961. He was consecrated in Rome, Italy on 21 December 1961 by Cardinal Grégoire-Pierre XV Agagianian, Patriarch of Cilicia assisted by Pietro Sigismondi, Titular Archbishop of Neapolis in Pisidia and Pierre Marie Joseph Veuillot, Titular Archbishop of Constantia in Thracia.

He was reported to have participated in the Second Vatican Council, Session One, Session Two, Session Three and Session Four, from 1962 until 1965. He designed and started the construction of the Basilica of Mary Queen of the Apostles in Yaoundé. He was one of the founders of the Catholic University of Central Africa.

Archbishop Jean Zoa died in Yaoundé, Cameroon on 20 March 1998, while in office at the age of 74 years. He was buried in the N'Vyolet Cemetery, "in the southern suburbs of Yaoundé". Reportedly, 30 bishops, 300 Cameroonian and foreign priests, and thousands of faithful, who included the president of Cameroon, Paul Biya, attended the funeral.

After his death, several government buildings have been named in his honour, including the Jean Zoa Medical Center, unveiled on 20 April 2017, at the Nkoldongo Social and Health Animation Center, in Nkolndongo (also Nkoldongo), Centre Region, Cameroon.

== See also ==
- Catholic Church in Cameroon

== Succession table ==
Catholic Church titles
Preceded by René Marie Graffin (4 March 1943 - 6 September 1961)	Archbishop of Yaoundé (11 September 1961 - 20 March 1998)	Succeeded by André Wouking (27 November 1998 - 10 November 2002)
