= Archdiocese of Douala =

Latin Catholic archdiocese in Cameroon

Coordinates: 4°03′N 9°42′E

Archdiocese of Douala Archidioecesis Dualaensis
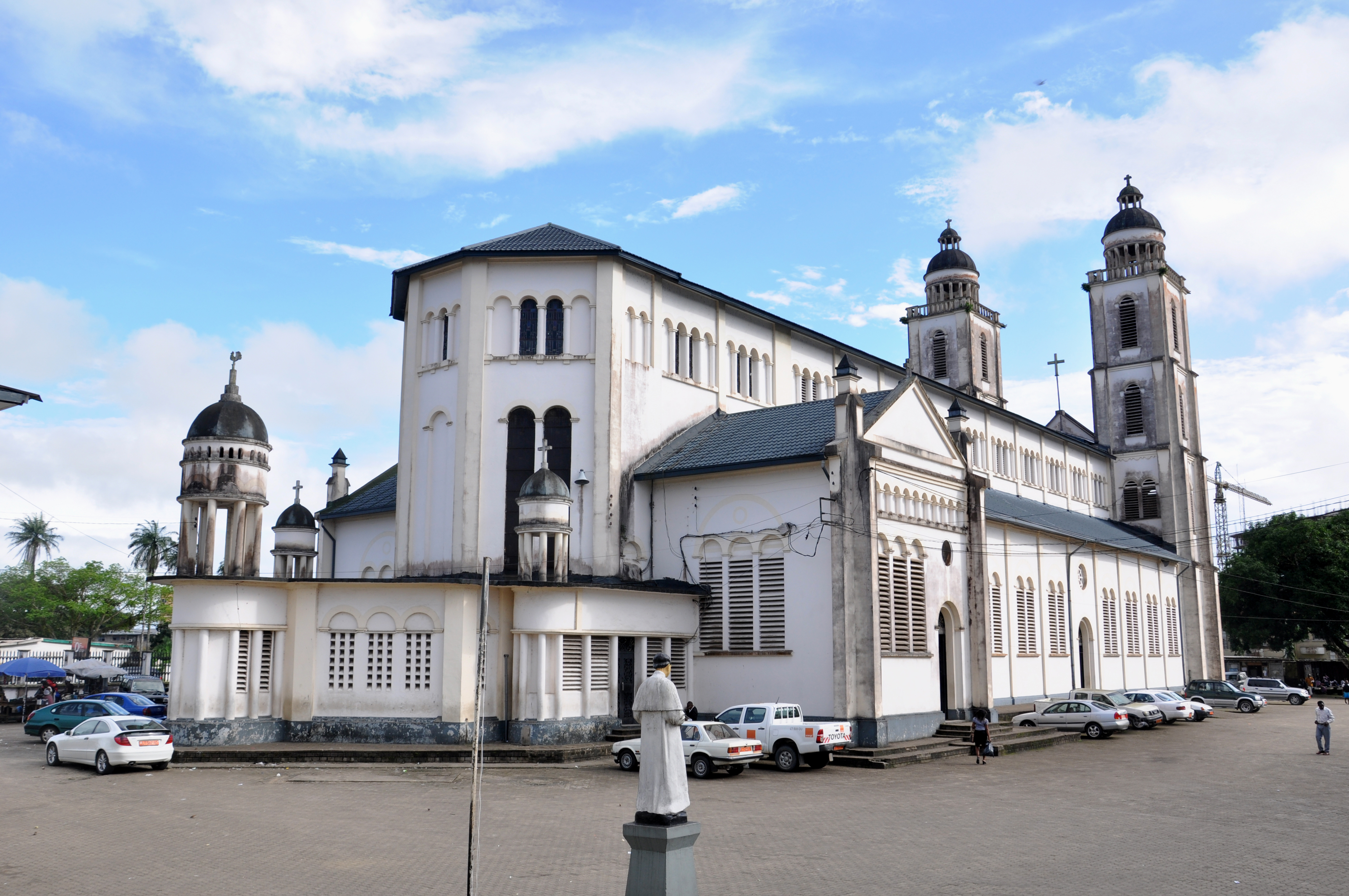
- Cathédrale Saint-Pierre et Saint-Paul in Douala

Location
- Country: Cameroon
- Headquarters: Douala

Statistics
- Area: 1,200 km^{2} (460 sq mi)
- Population: Total; Catholics: (as of 2023); 3804575; 802680 (21.1%)
- Parishes: 80

Information
- Denomination: Catholic Church
- Sui iuris church: Latin Church
- Rite: Roman Rite
- Established: 31 March 1931; 95 years ago
- Cathedral: Cathedral of Saints Peter and Paul, Douala
- Metropolitan Archbishop: Samuel Kleda
- Suffragans: Bafang, Bafoussam, Edéa, Eséka, Nkongsamba

The Archdiocese of Douala (Latin: Archidioecesis Dualaensis) is the Metropolitan See for the ecclesiastical province of Douala in Cameroon. The current archbishop is Archbishop Samuel Kleda; he had previously been the coadjutor archbishop to the Archbishop Emeritus, Cardinal Christian Wiyghan Tumi.

== History ==
- March 31, 1931: Established as Apostolic Prefecture of Douala from the Apostolic Vicariate of Cameroun
- May 27, 1932: Promoted as Apostolic Vicariate of Douala
- September 14, 1955: Promoted as Diocese of Douala
- March 18, 1982: Promoted as Metropolitan Archdiocese of Douala

== Special churches ==
The seat of the archbishop is the Cathédrale Saint-Pierre et Saint-Paul in Douala.

== Bishops ==
=== Ordinaries ===
Prefect Apostolic of Douala

- (Father) Mathurin-Marie Le Mailloux, C.S.Sp. (1931 – 1932); see below

Vicars Apostolic of Douala

- Mathurin-Marie Le Mailloux, C.S.Sp. (1932 – 1945); see above
- Pierre Bonneau, C.S.Sp. (1946 – 1957)

Bishops of Douala

- Thomas Mongo (1957 – 1973), resigned
- Simon Tonyé (1973 – 1982); see below

Archbishops of Douala

- Simon Tonyé (1982 – 1991); see above, resigned
- Cardinal Christian Wiyghan Tumi (1991 – 2009), retired
- Samuel Kleda (2009 – present)

=== Coadjutor bishops ===
- Simon Tonyé (1969-1973)
- Samuel Kleda (2007-2009)

=== Auxiliary bishops ===
- Thomas Mongo (1955-1957), appointed Bishop here
- Simon-Victor Tonyé Bakot (1987-1993), appointed Bishop of Edéa
- Gabriel Simo (1987-1994), appointed Auxiliary Bishop of Bafoussam
- Dieudonné Bogmis (1999-2004), appointed Bishop of Eséka

=== Other priests of this diocese who became bishops ===
- Pierre-Célestin Nkou, appointed Bishop of Sangmélima in 1963
- Marcellin-Marie Ndabnyemb, appointed Bishop of Batouri in 2018

== Suffragan Dioceses ==
- Bafang
- Bafoussam
- Edéa
- Eséka
- Nkongsamba

== See also ==
- Roman Catholicism in Cameroon
- List of Roman Catholic dioceses in Cameroon

== Sources ==
- GCatholic.org
