= Catholic Church in Cameroon =

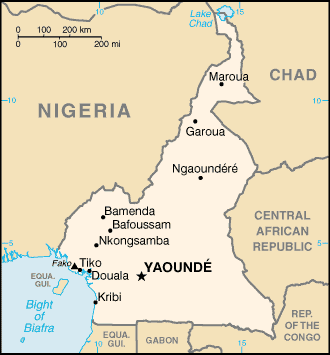
Map of Cameroon

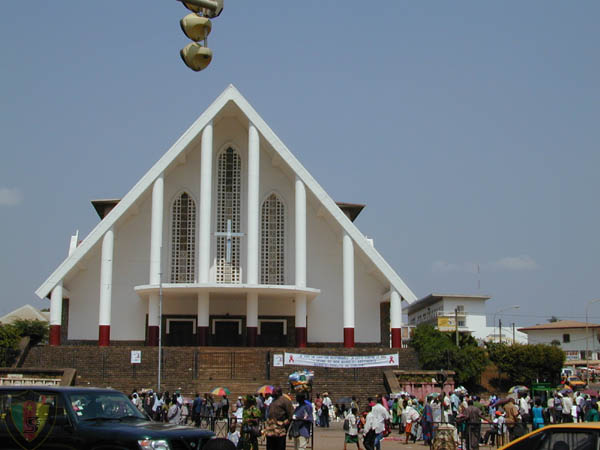
Yaoundé cathedral

The Catholic Church in Cameroon is part of the worldwide Catholic Church, under the spiritual leadership of the Pope in Rome.

There are almost ten million Catholics in the Republic of Cameroon, 38.4% of the population, in 24 Dioceses. A later survey put the figure at 7 million (26%) in 2023.

In 2000, there were 480 priests and 1860 men and women in religious orders.

== Structure ==
Within Cameroon the church organization consists of:

- Bamenda
  - Buéa
  - Kumba
  - Kumbo
  - Mamfe
- Bertoua
  - Batouri
  - Doumé-Abong' Mbang
  - Yokadouma
- Douala
  - Bafang
  - Bafoussam
  - Edéa
  - Eséka
  - Nkongsamba
- Garoua
  - Maroua-Mokolo
  - Ngaoundéré
  - Yagoua
- Yaoundé
  - Bafia
  - Ebolowa
  - Kribi
  - Mbalmayo
  - Obala
  - Sangmélima

== Notable persons ==
In 2023, Simon Mpeke (Baba Simon) became the first Cameroonian to be declared a Venerable by the Catholic Church.

== See also ==
- Religion in Cameroon
- Christianity in Cameroon
- Freedom of religion in Cameroon
- List of cathedrals in Cameroon
