= Bruno Ateba Edo =

Cameroonian Catholic prelate (born 1964

The Most Reverend Bruno Ateba Edo
- Bishop of Maroua-Mokolo, Cameroon
- Church: Catholic Church
- Archdiocese: Roman Catholic Archdiocese of Garoua
- See: Diocese of Maroua-Mokolo
- Appointed: 5 April 2014
- Installed: 17 May 2014
- Predecessor: Philippe Albert Joseph Stevens (11 November 1994 - 5 April 2014)
- Successor: Incumbent

Orders
- Ordination: 8 July 1995 by Jean-Marie-Joseph-Augustin Pasquier
- Consecration: 17 May 2014 by Piero Pioppo
- Rank: Bishop

Personal details
- Born: Bruno Ateba Edo; 20 November 1964 (age 61) Zoétélé, Diocese of Sangmélima, South Region, Cameroon

Styles of Bruno Ateba Edo
- Reference style: His Grace; The Right Reverend
- Spoken style: Your Grace
- Religious style: Bishop

Bruno Ateba Edo S.A.C. (born 20 November 1964) is a Cameroonian Catholic prelate who serves as the bishop of the Diocese of Maroua-Mokolo, in Cameroon since 5 April 2015. Before that, he served as a priest for the Pallottines, a Catholic religious order, from 8 July 1995 until 5 April 2014. He was appointed bishop by Pope Francis. He was consecrated on 27 May 2014 by Piero Pioppo, Titular Archbishop of Torcello. He is a professed member of the Society of the Catholic Apostolate religious order.

== Background and education ==
He was born on 20 November 1964, in Zoétélé, Diocese of Sangmélima, South Region, Cameroon. He studied philosophy at the Kabgayi Major Interdiocesan Seminary for Philosophy at Kabgayi, Rwanda. He then studied theology at the Saint Cyprien Theological Seminary in Ngoya, Centre Region, Cameroon. From 2001 until 2003, he studied at the Pallottina Vallendar Theological Institute (PVTI) in Vallendar, Germany, where he graduated with a licentiate in Pastoral Theology.

== Priest ==
On 15 August 1989, he took his preliminary vows as a member of the Pallottines. He took his perpetual vows on 2 October 1994. He was ordained a priest for the same religious order on 8 July 1995. He served as a priest until 5 April 2014. While a priest, he served in various roles and locations including:

- Vicar and then pastor of Saints Peter and Paul Parish, in Mfoundi, Yaoundé from 1995 until 2001.
- Studies at the Vinzenz Pallotti University in Vallendar, Germany, leading to the award of a licentiate in pastoral thology from 2001 until 2003.
- Rector of the Pallottina Theologate and Marie-Reine-des Apôtres Basilica of Mvolyé, Yaoundé from 2003 until 2009.
- Regional Rector of the Pallottina Society for Cameroon and Nigeria from 2008 until 2014.
- Chairman of the Conference of Major Superiors of Cameroon as of 2014.

== Bishop ==
On 5 April 2014, Pope Francis accepted the resignation from the pastoral care of the Catholic Diocese of Maroua-Mokolo, Cameroon, submitted by Bishop Philippe Albert Joseph Stevens. The Holy Father appointed Reverend Father Monsignor Bruno Ateba Edo, previously the "Regional Superior of the Pallottini Fathers for Cameroon and Nigeria" as the new bishop at Maroua-Mokolo. He was consecrated on 17 May 2014 by Piero Pioppo, Titular Archbishop of Torcello assisted by Samuel Kleda, Archbishop of Douala and Philippe Albert Joseph Stevens, Bishop Emeritus of Maroua-Mokolo. Bishop Bruno Ateba Edo continues to serve in that capacity, as of 2026.

== See also ==
- Catholic Church in Cameroon

== Succession table ==
Catholic Church titles
Preceded by Philippe Albert Joseph Stevens (11 November 1994 - 5 April 2014)	Bishop of Maroua-Mokolo (since 5 April 2014)	Succeeded by Incumbent
