= Emmanuel Abbo =

Cameroonian Catholic prelate (born 1969

The Most Reverend Emmanuel Abbo
- Bishop of Ngaoundéré, Cameroon
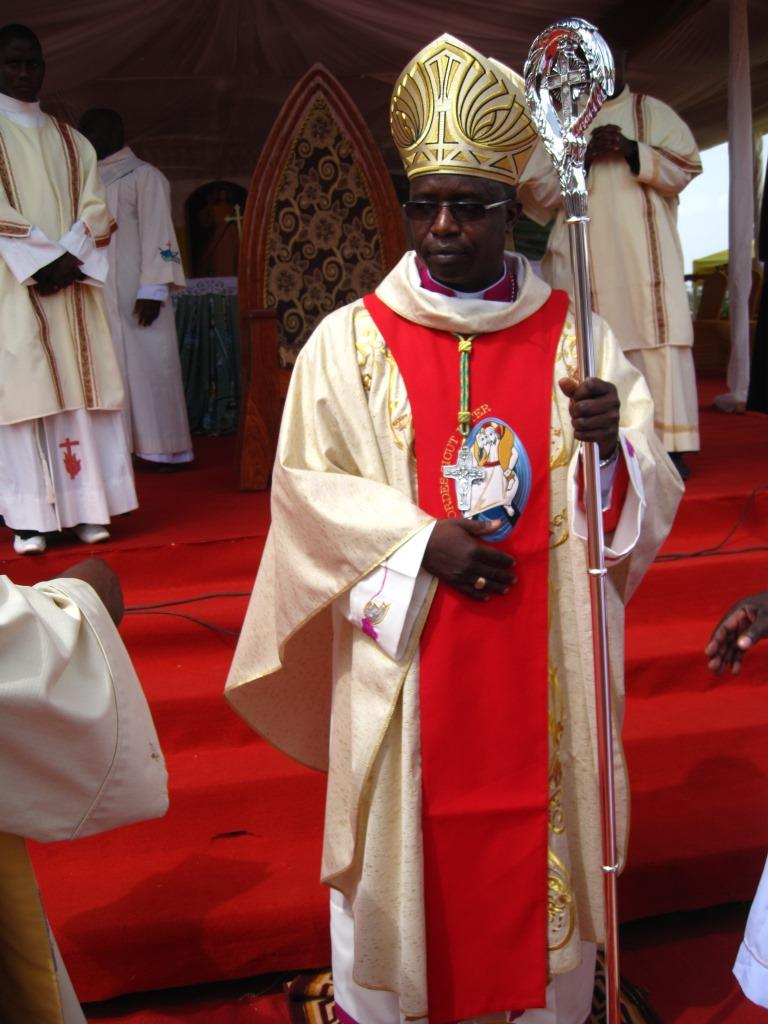
- Emmanuel Abbo in 2016
- Church: Catholic Church
- Archdiocese: Roman Catholic Archdiocese of Garoua
- See: Diocese of Ngaoundéré
- Appointed: 15 March 2016
- Installed: 30 April 2016
- Predecessor: Joseph Djida (23 October 2000 - 6 January 2015)
- Successor: Incumbent
- Other posts: Apostolic Administrator of Ngaoundéré (10 January 2015 - 30 November 2006)

Orders
- Ordination: 24 June 2000 by Jean-Marie-Joseph-Augustin Pasquier
- Consecration: 30 April 2016 by Piero Pioppo
- Rank: Bishop

Personal details
- Born: Emmanuel Abbo; 17 July 1969 (age 56) Mbe, Diocese of Ngaoundéré, Adamawa Region, Cameroon

Styles of Emmanuel Abbo
- Reference style: His Grace; The Right Reverend
- Spoken style: Your Grace
- Religious style: Bishop

Emmanuel Abbo (born 17 July 1969) is a Cameroonian Catholic prelate who serves as the bishop of the Diocese of Ngaoundéré, in Cameroon since 15 March 2016. Before that, from 24 June 2000 until 15 March 2016, he was a priest of the same Catholic See. He was appointed bishop by Pope Francis. He was consecrated at Ngaoundéré on 30 April 2016 by Piero Pioppo, Titular Archbishop of Torcello. He served as Apostolic Administrator of the Catholic Diocese of Ngaoundéré, Cameroon from 10 January 2015 until 15 March 2016, while still a priest.

== Background and education ==
He was born on 17 July 1969 in Mbe in the Diocese of Ngaoundere, Adamawa Region, Cameroon. He attended the Saint Augustin Interdiocesan Major Seminary in Maroua-Mokolo, where he studied both philosophy and theology. He also holds a licentiate in "Management Sciences (Administration of Companies)" awarded by the Catholic University of Central Africa, in Yaoundé, Cameroon.

== Priest ==
He was ordained a deacon on 19 June 1999, for the diocese of Ngaoundéré, Cameroon by Félix del Blanco Prieto, Titular Archbishop of Vannida. Bishop Jean-Marie-Joseph-Augustin Pasquier, of Ngaoundéré ordained him a priest on 24 June 2000. He served as a priest until 10 January 2015. While a priest, he served in various roles and locations, including:

- Assistant priest of the Cathedral at Ngaoundéré, Cameroon from 2000 until 2001.
- Studies in Management Science and Administration at the Catholic University of Central Africa, in Yaoundé, Cameroon from 2001 until 2004.
- Diocesan secretary for Catholic Education from 2004 until 2008.
- Parish priest of Saint Peter's Parish in Gada-Mabanga from 2005 until 2015.
- Bursar of the Catholic Diocese of Ngaoundéré, Cameroon from 2005 until 2015.
- Diocesan director of the Pontifical Mission Societies from 2005 until 2015.
- Diocesan director of Caritas from 2010 until 2016.
- Head of the Economic Administration of Ngaoundéré Catholic Diocese, Cameroon from 2010 until 2015.
- Episcopal Vicar of Ngaoundéré Diocese, Cameroon from 2010 until 2015.
- Apostolic Administrator of the diocese of Ngaoundere from 2015 until 2016.

== Bishop ==
On 15 March 2016, Pope Francis appointed him bishop of the Diocese of Ngaoundéré, in the Ecclesiastical Metropolitan Province of Garoua, in Cameroon. He was consecrated at Ngaoundéré on 30 April 2016 by Piero Pioppo, Titular Archbishop of Torcello assisted by Antoine Ntalou, Archbishop of Garoua and Barthélemy Yaouda Hourgo, Bishop of Yagoua. He continues to serve in that role as of 2025.

== See also ==
- Catholic Church in Cameroon

== Succession table ==
Catholic Church titles
Preceded by Joseph Djida (23 October 2000 - 6 January 2015)	Bishop of Ngaoundéré (since 15 March 2016)	Succeeded by Incumbent
Preceded by	Apostolic Administrator of Ngaoundéré (10 January 2015 - 15 March 2016)	Succeeded by
