= List of Christian monasteries in Rhineland-Palatinate =

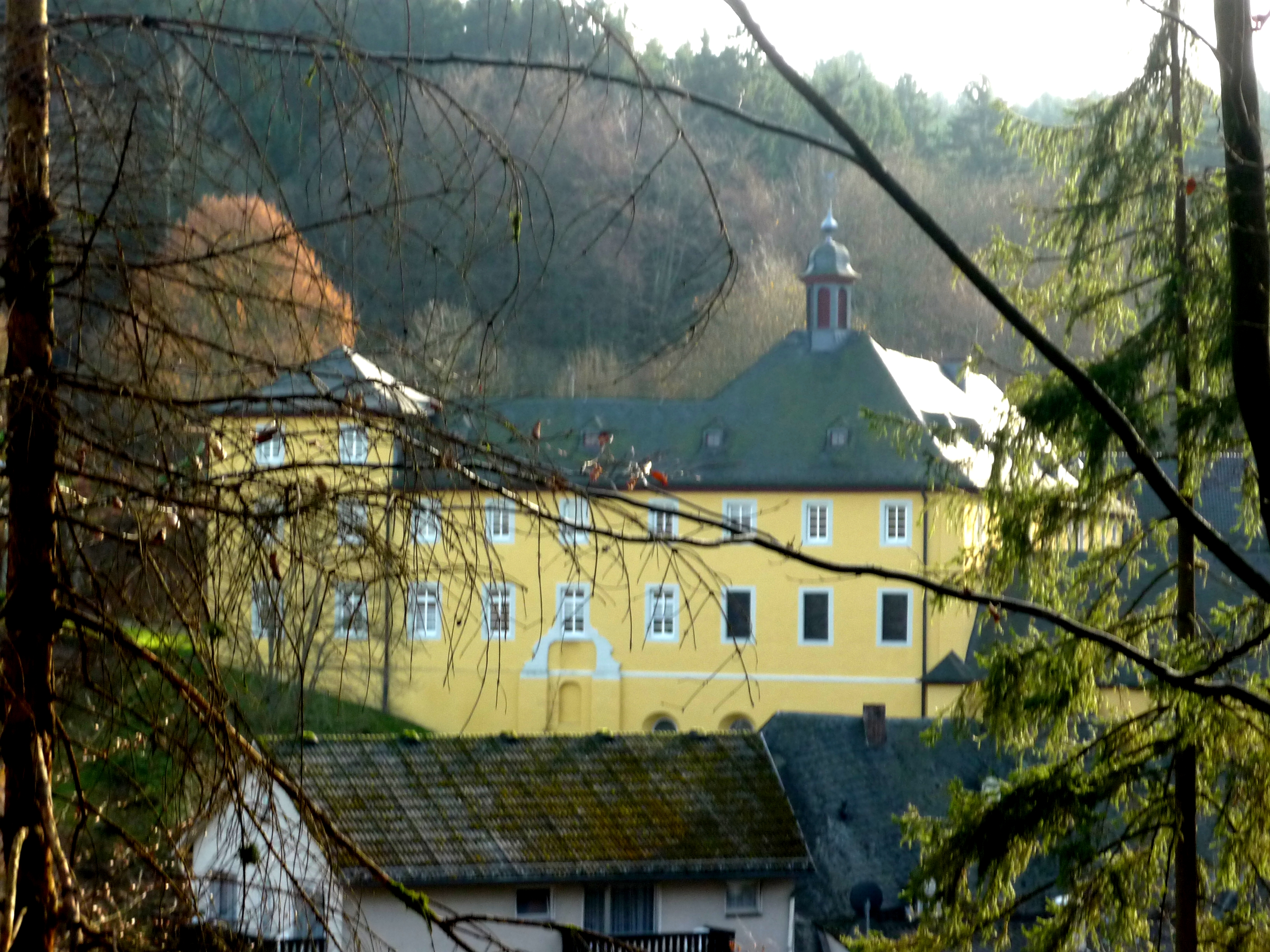
Former Marienthal Friary near Altenkirchen (Westerwald)

This is a list of Christian religious houses, both for men and for women, whether or not still in operation, in Rhineland-Palatinate and Saarland, Germany.

== List ==
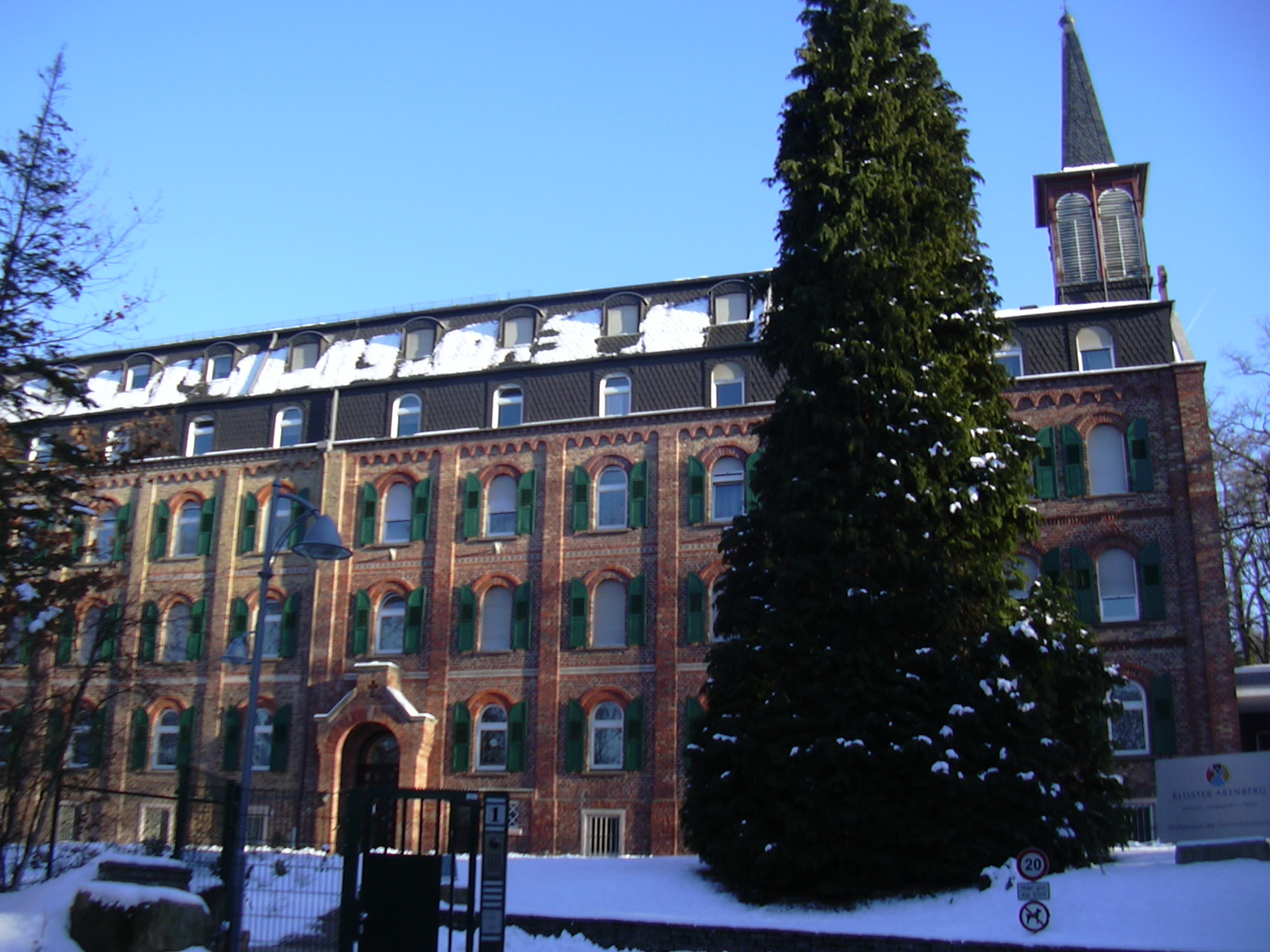
Kloster Arenberg in Koblenz

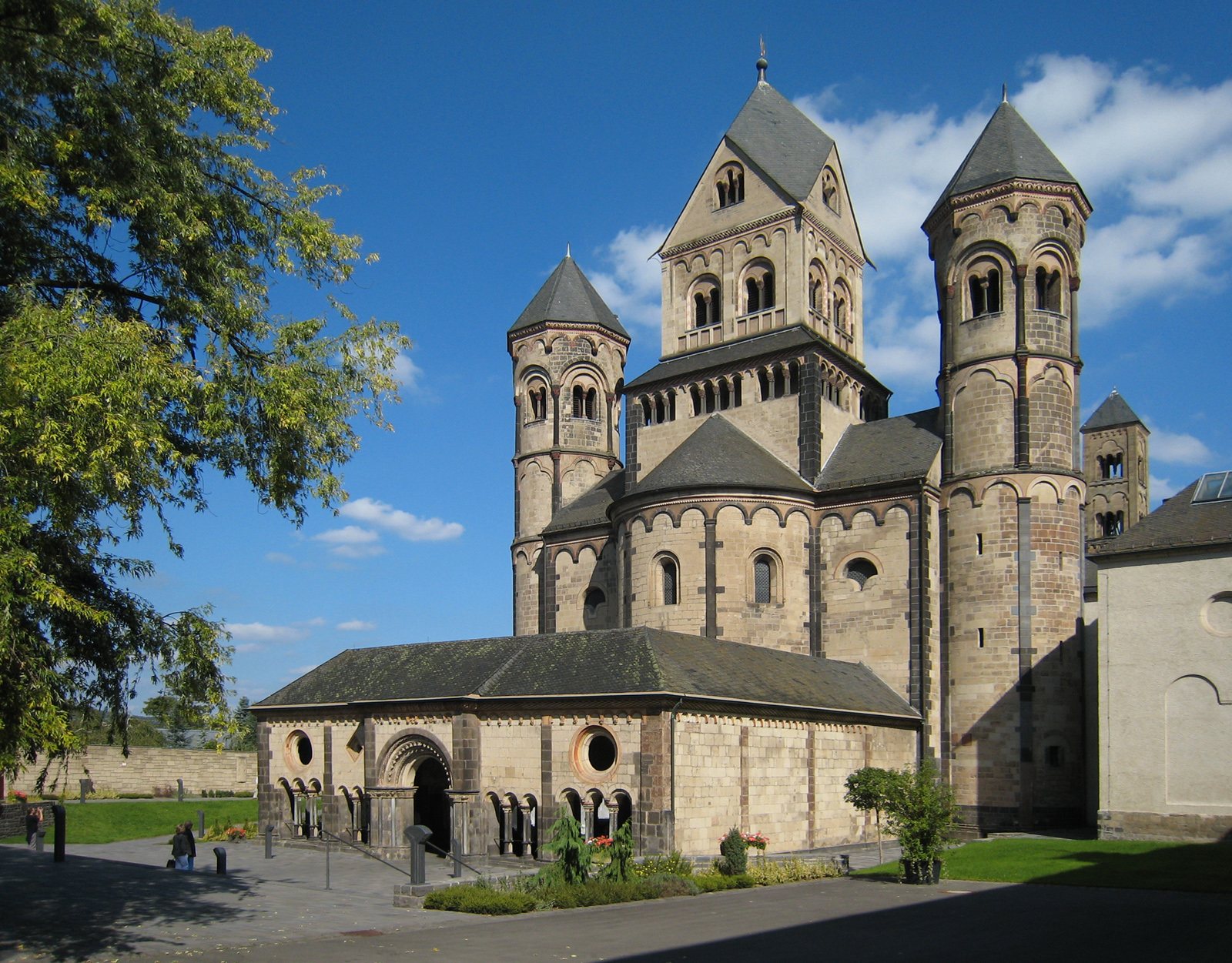
Maria Laach

- Arnstein Abbey in the Rhein-Lahn-Kreis; Premonstratensian canons until 1803; Greek Orthodox nunnery, the Heiliges Orthodoxes Kloster Dionysios Trikkis & Stagon, from 2019
- Former Missionshaus / Kloster Bruche in Betzdorf, Altenkirchen district
- Capuchin friary in Koblenz-Ehrenbreitstein; Capuchin friars
- Former Ehrenstein monastery near Neustadt (Wied)
- Hachenburg Friary, former monastery of the Franciscans in Hachenburg, Westerwaldkreis
- Kloster Arenberg (Arenberg Convent), in Koblenz, Dominican sisters
- Mariahilf motherhouse in Dernbach (Westerwald); Poor Handmaids of Jesus Christ (Dernbacher Schwestern or Arme Dienstmägde Jesu Christi / ADJC)
- Marienstatt Abbey in Streithausen near Hachenburg; Cistercian monks,
- Marienthal Friary in Marienthal, part of Seelbach in the Altenkirchen district; former Franciscan friary, closed 2026
- Maria Laach Abbey near Mendig in Mayen-Koblenz; Benedictine monks
- Sayn Abbey in Bendorf-Sayn; Premonstratensian canons until 1803
- Original Schoenstatt Shrine and the Vinzenz Pallotti University in Vallendar; Pallottine Fathers
- Seligenstatt Priory near Seck in the Westerwald district; Benedictine nuns until 1430s
- Tönisstein Abbey near Andernach

== See also ==
Marienstatt Abbey, main building

- List of Christian monasteries in Germany
