= List of universities in Germany =

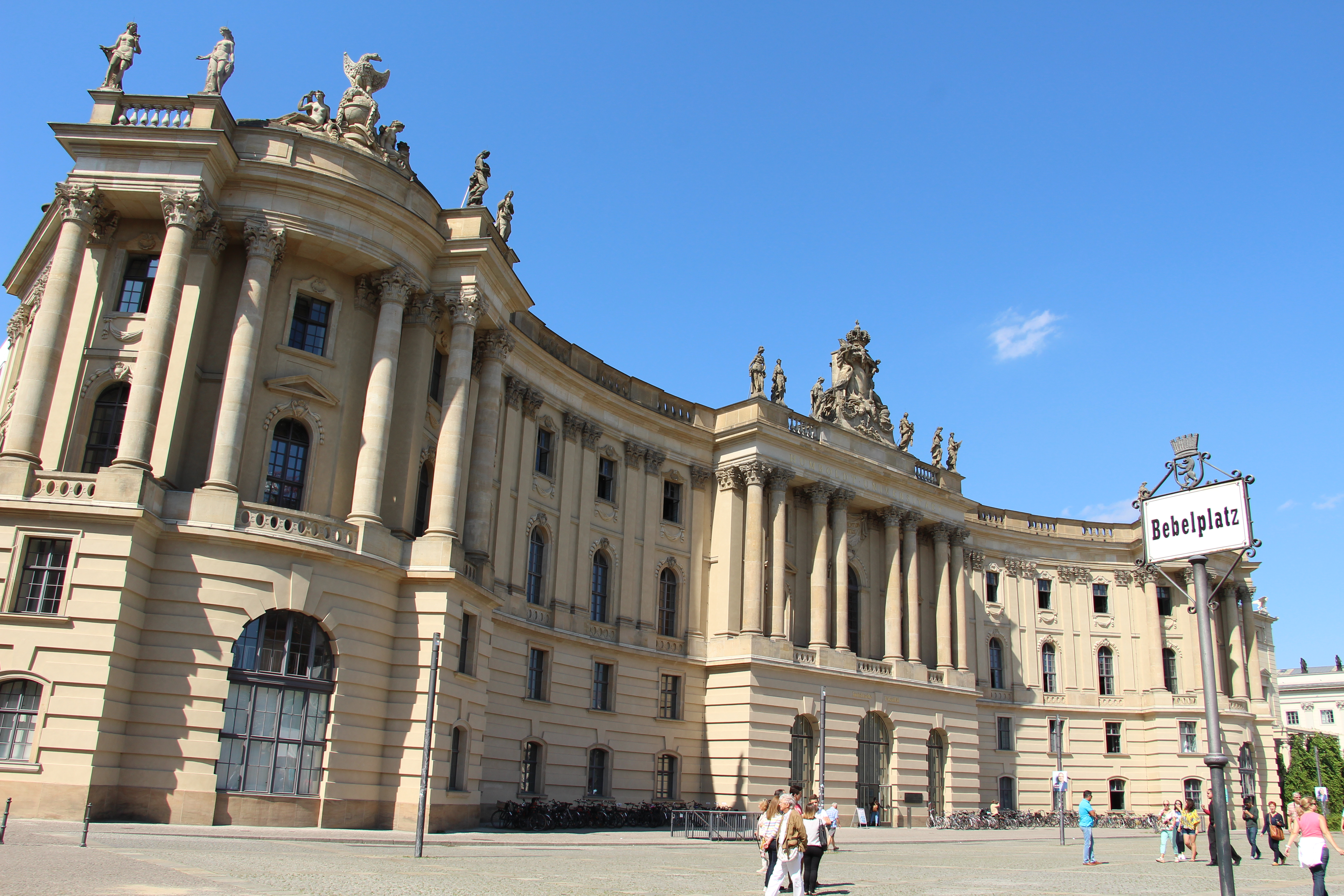
In 1933, the Nazi book burnings took place on Bebelplatz in front of the Humboldt University Old Library.

This is a list of the universities in Germany. The list also includes German Technische Universitäten (TUs) (Technical Universities), which have official and full university status, but usually focus on engineering and the natural sciences rather than covering the whole spectrum of academic disciplines.

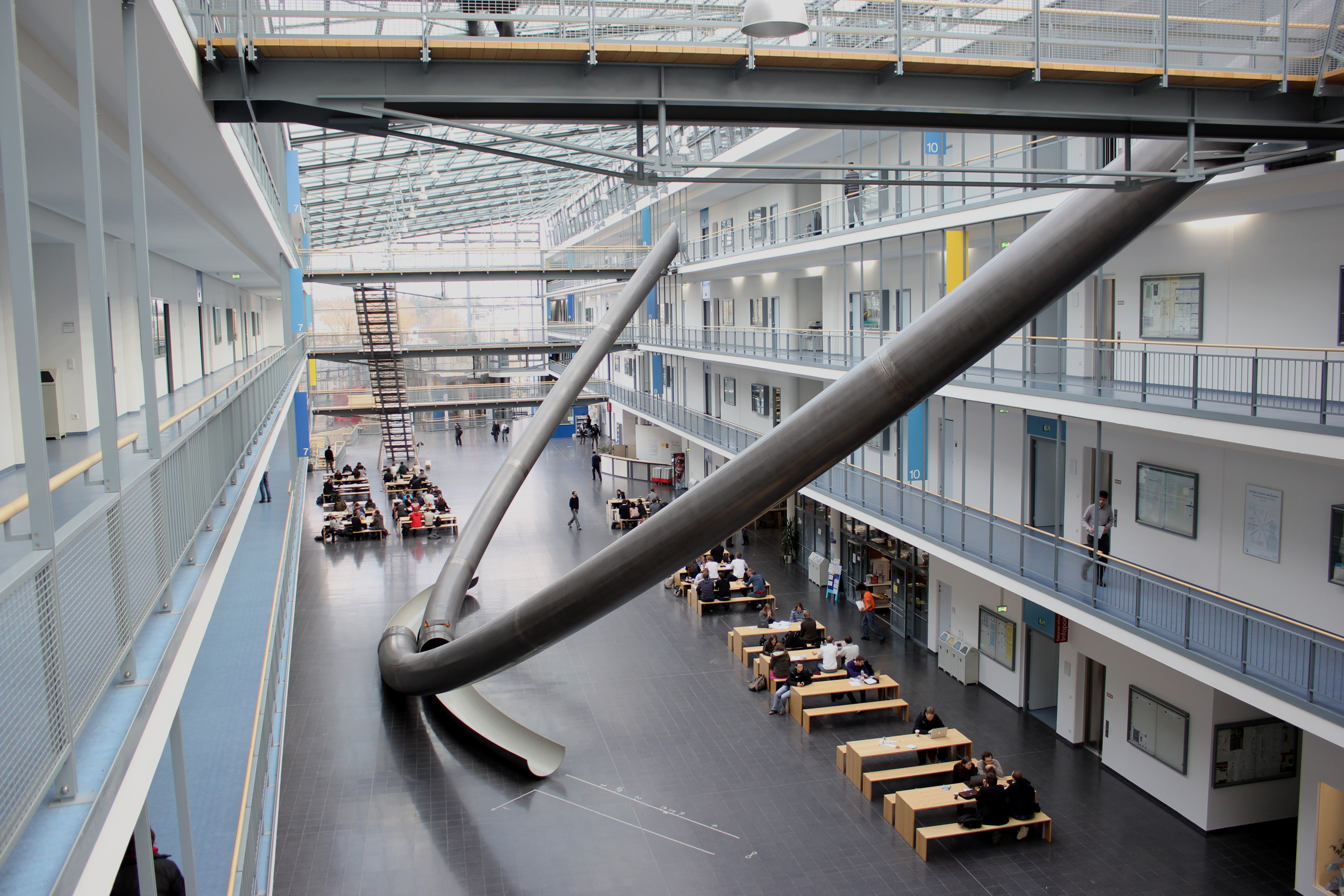
TU Munich, the leading technical university in Germany according to most rankings

The list does not, however, cover the German Fachhochschulen (Universities of Applied Sciences) or institutions that cover only certain disciplines such as business studies, fine arts, or engineering. Those do not have all of the responsibilities and limitations of universities, and most cannot award doctorate degrees on their own.

Most universities follow the Humboldtian model of higher education. In general, public German universities do not charge tuition fees. At many universities this usually also applies to foreign students, though regulations for non-EU foreign citizens differ regionally. Universities may charge small semester fees for administrative costs. Some universities include the Deutschlandticket at a discounted price in the semester fees.

== List ==
List of German state-recognized universities
University	Location	State	Type	Founding date	Number of students	Right to award doctorates	Status in the German Universities Excellence Initiative (as of 2026)	Humboldt Ranking 2023	THE World University Ranking 2026	Note	Affiliated Nobel Prize Winners
RWTH Aachen University	Aachen	North Rhine-Westphalia	public	1870	47,000	yes	regarded as a university of excellence	29	92	technical university	11
Augsburg University	Augsburg	Bavaria	public	1970	20,000	yes		59	n/a		
University of Bamberg	Bamberg	Bavaria	public	1972	12,000	yes		41	n/a		
University of Bayreuth	Bayreuth	Bavaria	public	1975	13,000	yes		21	301-350		
Bard College Berlin	Berlin	Berlin	private	1999	400	no		n/a	n/a		
Berlin University of the Arts	Berlin	Berlin	public	1696	3,500	yes		108	n/a	art school	
Charité	Berlin	Berlin	public	1710	8,000	yes	regarded as a university of excellence	n/a	91	medical school, co-owned by FU and HU Berlin	8
ESCP Business School	Berlin, Paris	Berlin	private	1819	10,000 (including other campuses)	yes (in France)		n/a	n/a	business school	
European School of Management and Technology	Berlin	Berlin	private	2002	1,000	no		n/a	n/a	business school	
Free University of Berlin	Berlin	Berlin	public	1948	33,000	yes	regarded as a university of excellence	1	113		15
German International University	Berlin	Berlin	private	2019	900	no		n/a	n/a		
Hertie School	Berlin	Berlin	private	2003	900	yes		24	n/a	school of governance	
Humboldt University of Berlin	Berlin	Berlin	public	1810	36,000	yes	regarded as a university of excellence	2	89		57
International Psychoanalytic University Berlin	Berlin	Berlin	private	2009	600	yes		74	n/a	medical school	
Berlin University of Psychology	Berlin	Berlin	private	2013	1,200	no		n/a	n/a	medical school	
TU Berlin	Berlin	Berlin	public	1879	35,000	yes	regarded as a university of excellence	8	160	technical university	9
Bielefeld University	Bielefeld	North Rhine-Westphalia	public	1969	25,000	yes		27	n/a		
Ruhr University Bochum	Bochum	North Rhine-Westphalia	public	1962	43,000	yes		23	251-300		
University of Bonn	Bonn	North Rhine-Westphalia	public	1818	38,000	yes	regarded as a university of excellence	17	92		12
TU Braunschweig	Braunschweig	Lower Saxony	public	1745	20,000	yes		38	601-700	technical university	
Constructor University	Bremen	Bremen	private	2001	2,000	yes		12	501-600		
University of Bremen	Bremen	Bremen	public	1971	19,000	yes		35	301-350		
TU Chemnitz	Chemnitz	Saxony	public	1836	9,000	yes		60	n/a	technical university	
TU Clausthal	Clausthal-Zellerfeld	Lower Saxony	public	1775	3,000	yes		71	n/a	technical university	
TU Brandenburg	Cottbus	Brandenburg	public	2013	7,000	yes		n/a	n/a	technical university	
TU Darmstadt	Darmstadt	Hesse	public	1877	25,000	yes		25	251-300	technical university	1
TU Dortmund	Dortmund	North Rhine-Westphalia	public	1968	34,000	yes		50	501-600	technical university	
Dresden International University	Dresden	Saxony	private	2003	2,000	no		n/a	n/a		
TU Dresden	Dresden	Saxony	public	1828	30,000	yes	regarded as a university of excellence	31	174	technical university	2
Herinrich Heine University Düsseldorf	Düsseldorf	North Rhine-Westphalia	public	1965	35,000	yes		44	251-300		
Catholic University of Eichstätt-Ingolstadt	Eichstätt, Ingolstadt	Bavaria	ecclesiastical	1980	5,000	yes		72	n/a	theological faculty	
University of Erfurt	Erfurt	Thuringia	public	1392, 1994	6,000	yes		63	n/a		
University of Erlangen-Nürnberg	Erlangen, Nuremberg	Bavaria	public	1743	39,000	yes		26	201-250		4
University of Duisburg-Essen	Duisburg, Essen	North Rhine-Westphalia	public	2003	42,000	yes		36	301-350		
University of Flensburg	Flensburg	Schleswig-Holstein	public	1946	6,000	limited		66	n/a		
Frankfurt School of Finance & Management	Frankfurt (Main)	Hesse	private	1957	3,000	yes		76	n/a	business school	
Goethe University Frankfurt	Frankfurt (Main)	Hesse	public	1914	46,000	yes		22	201-250		19
Sankt Georgen Graduate School of Philosophy and Theology	Frankfurt (Main)	Hesse	ecclesiastical	1926	400	yes		n/a	n/a	theological faculty	
European University Viadrina	Frankfurt (Oder)	Brandenburg	public	1991	5,000	yes		53	n/a		
Freiberg University of Mining and Technology	Freiberg	Saxony	public	1765	4,000	yes		37	1001-1200	technical university	
University of Freiburg	Freiburg	Baden-Württemberg	public	1457	24,000	yes		10	138		19
Freiburg University of Education	Freiburg	Baden-Württemberg	public	1962	5,000	limited		n/a	n/a	university of education	
Theological University of Friedensau	Möckern	Saxony-Anhalt	ecclesiastical	1899	300	limited		127	n/a	theological faculty	
Zeppelin University	Friedrichshafen	Baden-Württemberg	private	2003	800	yes		n/a	n/a		
University of Theology Fulda	Fulda	Hesse	ecclesiastical	1743	10	yes		n/a	n/a	theological faculty	
University of Giessen	Giessen	Hesse	public	1607	25,000	yes		34	351-400		
University of Göttingen	Göttingen	Lower Saxony	public	1737	28,000	yes		9	122		45
University of Greifswald	Greifswald	Mecklenburg-Vorpommern	public	1456	10,000	yes		57	401-500		
University of Hagen	Hagen	North Rhine-Westphalia	public	1974	72,000	yes		85	801-1000		
Martin-Luther-University Halle-Wittenberg	Halle, Wittenberg	Saxony-Anhalt	public	1502	19,000	yes		33	n/a		8
Bucerius Law School	Hamburg	Hamburg	private	2000	700	yes		127	n/a	law school	
HafenCity University Hamburg	Hamburg	Hamburg	public	2006	2,500	yes		89	n/a		
Helmut Schmidt University	Hamburg	Hamburg	public	1973	2,500	yes		87	n/a	military university, part of the German Armed Forces	
Kühne Logistics University	Hamburg	Hamburg	private	2010	400	yes		78	n/a	business school	
TU Hamburg	Hamburg	Hamburg	public	1978	7,500	yes		32	501-600	technical university	
University of Hamburg	Hamburg	Hamburg	public	1919	42,000	yes	regarded as a university of excellence	28	125		10
Leibniz University Hannover	Hanover	Lower Saxony	public	1831	27,000	yes		11	351-400		9
Hannover Medical School	Hanover	Lower Saxony	public	1965	4,000	yes		88	n/a	medical school	
University of Veterinary Medicine Hannover	Hanover	Lower Saxony	public	1778	2,000	yes		68	n/a	school of veterinary medicine	
Center for Jewish Studies Heidelberg	Heidelberg	Baden-Württemberg	private	1979	100	yes		n/a	n/a	theological faculty	
University of Heidelberg	Heidelberg	Baden-Württemberg	public	1386	30,000	yes	regarded as a university of excellence	6	49		29
University of Hildesheim	Hildesheim	Lower Saxony	public	1978	8,000	yes		84	n/a		
TU Ilmenau	Ilmenau	Thuringia	public	1953	4,500	yes		65	n/a	technical university	
University of Jena	Jena	Thuringia	public	1558	17,000	yes		43	201-250		8
RPTU University Kaiserslautern-Landau	Kaiserslautern, Landau	Rhineland-Palatinate	public	1970, 2023	17,000	yes		42	501-600	technical university	
Karlsruhe Institute of Technology	Karlsruhe	Baden-Württemberg	public	2009	23,000	yes	regarded as a university of excellence	3	166	technical university	6
Karlsruhe University of Education	Karlsruhe	Baden-Württemberg	public	1962	4,000	yes		n/a	n/a	university of education	
University of Kassel	Kassel	Hesse	public	1971	25,000	yes		61	n/a		
Kiel University	Kiel	Schleswig-Holstein	public	1665	24,500	yes		46	351-400		12
University of Koblenz	Koblenz	Rhineland-Palatinate	public	1903, 2023	10,000	yes		n/a	n/a		
German Sport University Cologne	Cologne	North Rhine-Westphalia	public	1947	6,000	yes		n/a	n/a	sport university	
Cologne University of Catholic Theology	Cologne	North Rhine-Westphalia	ecclesiastical	1925	85	yes		n/a	n/a	theological faculty	
University of Cologne	Cologne	North Rhine-Westphalia	public	1388	43,500	yes		18	164		12
University of Konstanz	Konstanz	Baden-Württemberg	public	1966	11,500	yes	regarded as a university of excellence (no longer from 2027)	4	251-300		
Medical University of Lausitz	Lausitz	Brandenburg	public	2024	0	yes		n/a	n/a	medical school	
HHL Leipzig Graduate School of Management	Leipzig	Saxony	private	1898, 1992	700	yes		n/a	n/a	business school	
Leipzig University	Leipzig	Saxony	public	1409	31,000	yes		40	n/a		10
University of Lübeck	Lübeck	Schleswig-Holstein	public	1964	5,000	yes		51	n/a		
Ludwigsburg University of Education	Ludwigsburg	Baden-Württemberg	public	1962	5,500	limited		n/a	n/a	university of education	
Leuphana University of Lüneburg	Lüneburg	Lower Saxony	public	1946	10,000	yes		82	401-500		
Otto von Guericke University of Magdeburg	Magdeburg	Saxony-Anhalt	public	1993	14,000	yes		52	601-800		
University of Mainz	Mainz	Rhineland-Palatinate	public	1477	31,000	yes		30	301-350		
University of Mannheim	Mannheim	Baden-Württemberg	public	1907	12,000	yes		64	201-250		
Marburg University	Marburg	Hesse	public	1527	21,000	yes		39	401-500		11
Munich School of Philosophy	Munich	Bavaria	ecclesiastical	1925	500	yes		n/a	n/a	theological faculty	
LMU Munich	Munich	Bavaria	public	1472	53,000	yes	regarded as a university of excellence	5	34		50
TU Munich	Munich	Bavaria	public	1868	52,000	yes	regarded as a university of excellence	7	27	technical university	19
Münster University of Philosophy and Theology	Münster	North Rhine-Westphalia	ecclesiastical	2004	500	yes		n/a	n/a	theological faculty	
University of Münster	Münster	North Rhine-Westphalia	public	1780	43,000	yes		16	195		8
University of the Bundeswehr Munich	Neubiberg	Bavaria	public	1973	3,500	yes		94	n/a	military university, part of the German Armed Forces	
Augustana Divinity School	Neuendettelsau	Bavaria	ecclesiastical	1947	600	yes		n/a	n/a	theological faculty	
Brandenburg Medical School Theodor Fontane	Neuruppin	Brandenburg	private	2014	2,500	yes		n/a	n/a	medical school	
University of Technology Nuremberg	Nuremberg	Bavaria	public	2021	20	yes		n/a	n/a	technical university	
Oberusel Theological University	Oberusel	Hesse	ecclesiastical	1949	200	yes		n/a	n/a	theological faculty	
EBS University for Business and Law	Oestrich-Winkel	Hesse	private	1971	2000	yes		n/a	n/a	law school	
University of Oldenburg	Oldenburg	Lower Saxony	public	1973	15,000	yes		49	n/a		
University of Osnabrück	Osnabrück	Lower Saxony	public	1629	13,500	yes		79	n/a		
Paderborn Faculty of Theology	Paderborn	North Rhine-Westphalia	ecclesiastical	1614	400	yes		127	n/a	theological faculty	
University of Paderborn	Paderborn	North Rhine-Westphalia	public	1972	20,000	yes		62	601-800		
University of Passau	Passau	Bavaria	public	1978	12,000	yes		58	601-800		
University of Potsdam	Potsdam	Brandenburg	public	1991	21,000	yes		14	201-250		
University of Regensburg	Regensburg	Bavaria	public	1962	21,000	yes		20	401-500		
University of Rostock	Rostock	Mecklenburg-Vorpommern	public	1419	14,000	yes		73	n/a		
Saarland University	Saarbrücken	Saarland	public	1948	17,000	yes		47	501-600		
University of Education Schwäbisch Gmünd	Schwäbisch Gmünd	Baden-Württemberg	public	1962	3,000	limited		n/a	n/a	university of education	
University of Siegen	Siegen	North Rhine-Westphalia	public	1972	17,000	yes		55	501-600		
German University of Administrative Sciences Speyer	Speyer	Rhineland-Palatinate	public	1947	500	yes		127	n/a	university of administrative science	
Stuttgart Free University	Stuttgart	Baden-Württemberg	private	1946	600	yes		n/a	n/a		
University of Stuttgart	Stuttgart	Baden-Württemberg	public	1829	23,000	yes		13	251-300		
University of Hohenheim	Hohenheim	Baden-Württemberg	public	1818	9,000	yes		48	n/a		
Trier Faculty of Theology	Trier	Rhineland-Palatinate	ecclesiastical	1950	150	yes		n/a	n/a	theological faculty	
University of Trier	Trier	Rhineland-Palatinate	public	1970	15,000	yes		56	n/a		
University of Tübingen	Tübingen	Baden-Württemberg	public	1477	28,000	yes	regarded as a university of excellence	15	98		11
University of Ulm	Ulm	Baden-Württemberg	public	1967	10,000	yes		45	251-300		
Vinzenz Pallotti University	Vallendar	Rhineland-Palatinate	ecclesiastical	1946	400	yes		n/a	n/a	theological faculty	
WHU – Otto Beisheim School of Management	Vallendar	Rhineland-Palatinate	private	1984	2,000	yes		n/a	n/a	business school	
University of Vechta	Vechta	Lower Saxony	public	1995	6,000	yes		75	n/a		
Bauhaus-University Weimar	Weimar	Thuringia	public	1860	4,000	yes		67	n/a		
Weingarten University of Education	Weingarten	Baden-Württemberg	public	1962	3,500	limited		n/a	n/a	university of education	
Charlotte Fresenius University	Wiesbaden	Hesse	private	2021	1,000	no		n/a	n/a	medical school	
Witten/Herdecke University	Witten	North Rhine-Westphalia	public	1982	3,000	yes		80	n/a		
University of Wuppertal	Wuppertal	North Rhine-Westphalia	public	1972	23,000	yes		54	601-800		
Theological University Wuppertal	Wuppertal	North Rhine-Westphalia	ecclesiastical	1974	200	yes		n/a	n/a	theological faculty	
University of Würzburg	Würzburg	Bavaria	public	1402	28,000	yes		19	179		14

== See also ==
- Charles University in Prague (Karls-Universität) – The first German-speaking university
- Education in Germany
- Franco-German University – An organization of universities across France and Germany
- German Academic Exchange Service
- German Universities Excellence Initiative
- List of oldest universities in continuous operation
- Open access in Germany
- TU9 – An association of 9 German universities of technology
- U15 – An association of 15 German research-intensive universities
- UAS7 – An association of 7 German Universities of Applied Sciences
