= Ngaouyanga =

- Coordinates: 7.9000°N 13.6000°E
- Country: Cameroon
- Region: Adamawa
- Department: Vina
- Elevation: 610 m (2,000 ft)

Population (2005)
  - Total: 1,598

Ngaouyanga (also Gaoyanga, Goyanga) is a village in the commune of Mbe in the Adamawa Region of Cameroon. et le département de la Vina au Cameroun, on the road from Ngaoundéré to Mbe and Garoua.

== Population ==
In 1967, the settlement contained 667 inhabitants, mostly Duru. At the time of the 2005 census, there were 1598 people in the village.

== Infrastructure ==
There is a public school.

== Bibliography ==
- Jean Boutrais, 1993, Peuples et cultures de l'Adamaoua (Cameroun) : actes du colloque de Ngaoundéré du 14 au 16 janvier 1992, Paris : Éd. de l'ORSTOM u.a.
- Dictionnaire des villages de l'Adamaoua, ONAREST, Yaoundé, October 1974, 133 p.
- Tomas Sundnes Drønen, Communication and conversion in northern Cameroon: the Dii people and Norwegian missionaries, 1934-1960, Brill, Leiden, Boston, 2009, 234 p. ISBN 978-90-04-17754-3
