= Emmanuel Bushu =

South African Catholic prelate (born 1944

The Most Reverend Emmanuel Bushu
- Bishop Emeritus of Buéa, Cameroon
- Church: Catholic Church
- Archdiocese: Roman Catholic Archdiocese of Bamenda
- See: Diocese of Buéa
- Appointed: 30 November 2006
- Installed: 30 January 2007
- Term ended: 28 December 2019
- Predecessor: Pius Suh Awa (29 January 1973 - 30 November 2006)
- Successor: Michael Miabesue Bibi (since 5 January 2021)
- Other posts: Bishop of Yagoua (17 December 1992 - 30 November 2006)

Orders
- Ordination: 7 January 1973
- Consecration: 25 March 1993 by Santos Abril y Castelló
- Rank: Bishop

Personal details
- Born: Emmanuel Bushu; 31 July 1944 (age 81) Ngorim Northwest Region, Cameroon

Styles of Emmanuel Bushu
- Reference style: His Grace; The Right Reverend
- Spoken style: Your Grace
- Religious style: Bishop

Emmanuel Bushu (born 31 July 1944) is a Cameroonian Catholic prelate who served the Bishop of the Roman Catholic Diocese of Buéa, in Cameroon from 30 November 2006 until his age-related retirement on 28 December 2019. Before that, from 17 December 1992 until 30 November 2006, he was bishop of the Diocese of Yagoua, Cameroon. Pope John Paul II appointed him bishop. He was consecrated at Yagoua on 25 March 1993 by Santos Abril y Castelló, Titular Archbishop of Tamada. On 30 November 2006, Pope Benedict XVI transferred him to the Catholic Diocese of Buéa. He was installed there as the local ordinary on 30 January 2007. On 28 December 2019, Pope Francis accepted his age-related resignation from the pastoral care of the Diocese of Buea. He lives on as Bishop Emeritus of Buéa, Cameroon.

== Background and education ==
He was born on 31 July 1944 in Ngorim, Northwest Region, in Cameroon. He studied both philology and theology at seminary before he was ordained a priest in 1973.

== Priest ==
He was ordained a priest for the Catholic Church in Cameroon on 7 January 1973. He served as a priest until 17 December 1992.

== Bishop ==
On 17 December 1992, Pope John Paul II appointed him Bishop of the Diocese of Yagoua, in the Catholic Metropolitan Province of Garoua, in the extreme north of Cameroon. He was consecrated bishop and installed at Yagoua on 25 March 1993 by the hands of Santos Abril y Castelló, Titular Archbishop of Tamada and Papal Nuncio assisted by Antoine Ntalou, Archbishop of Garoua and Cornelius Fontem Esua, Bishop of Kumbo. Bishop Emmanuel Bushu served in that capacity until 30 November 2006.

On 30 November 2006, Pope Benedict XVI transferred Bishop Emmanuel Bushu, previously local ordinary at Yagoua, to the Diocese of Buéa and appointed him local ordinary there. He was installed at Buéa on 30 January 2007. He served in that capacity for the next thirteen years. During that time-frame, he served as the chairman of the board of trustees of the Catholic University Institute of Buea (CUIB).

On 28 December 2019, Pope Francis accepted his retirement request, with the bishop having attained the mandatory retirement age for Catholic bishops. That same day, Michael Miabesue Bibi, at that time Auxiliary Bishop of the Archdiocese of Bamenda, was appointed Apostolic Administrator at Buea.

== See also ==
- Catholic Church in Cameroon

== Succession table ==
Catholic Church titles
Preceded by Pius Suh Awa (29 January 1973 - 30 November 2006)	Bishop of Buéa (30 November 2006 - 28 December 2019)	Succeeded by Incumbent
Preceded by Antoine Ntalou (19 November 1982 - 23 January 1992)	Bishop of Yagoua (17 December 1992 - 30 November 2006)	Succeeded by Barthélemy Yaouda Hourgo (since 31 May 2008)
