= Philippe Stevens =

Belgian Roman Catholic prelate (1937–2021)

His Excellency, the Most Reverend Philippe Stevens PFE
- Bishop of Maroua-Mokolo
- Archdiocese: Garoua
- Diocese: Maroua-Mokolo
- Installed: 11 November 1994
- Term ended: 5 April 2014
- Predecessor: Jacques de Bernon
- Successor: Bruno Ateba Edo

Orders
- Ordination: 13 July 1980 by Jacques de Bernon
- Consecration: 15 January 1995 by André Wouking

Personal details
- Born: Philippe Albert Joseph Stevens; 30 March 1937 Quaregnon, Belgium
- Died: 7 December 2021 (aged 84) Nyons, France

Philippe Albert Joseph Stevens, PFE (30 March 1937 – 7 December 2021) was a Belgian Catholic prelate who served as Bishop of Maroua-Makolo from 1994 to 2014. He was a member of the Little Brothers of the Gospel.

== Biography ==
Born on 30 March 1937 in Quaregnon, Stevens was the seventh child in a family of nine children. Raised as a devout Catholic, he attended the Catholic University of Leuven. He earned a degree in philosophy in 1965 and three years later joined the Little Brothers of the Gospel. In the 1960s, he arrived in Cameroon, starting in Mayo-Ouldémé, where he became a missionary under the leadership of Baba Simon. He was then ordained a priest on 13 July 1980 by Jacques de Bernon, who was then Bishop of Maroua-Makolo. In 1994, de Bernon retired and was succeeded by Stevens on 11 November of that year. He was consecrated on 15 January 1995 by André Wouking. On 5 April 2014, Pope Francis accepted his resignation on the grounds of age. During his time as Bishop, he was dedicated to interreligious dialogue between Christians and Muslims.

Stevens died on 7 December 2021, at the age of 84.
