= Christian Tumi =

Catholic cardinal (1930–2021)

His Eminence Christian Tumi
- Cardinal, Archbishop Emeritus of Douala
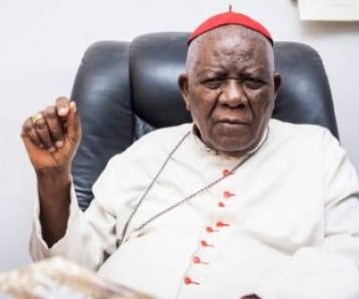
- Tumi in September 2019.
- Church: Catholic Church
- Archdiocese: Douala
- Appointed: 31 August 1991
- Term ended: 17 November 2009
- Predecessor: Simon Tonyé
- Successor: Samuel Kleda
- Other post: Cardinal-Priest of Santi Martiri dell'Uganda a Poggio Ameno (1988-2021)
- Previous posts: Bishop of Yagoua (1979–82); Coadjutor Archbishop of Garoua (1982–84); Archbishop of Garoua (1984–91); President of the Cameroon Episcopal Conference (1985–91)

Orders
- Ordination: 17 April 1966 by Julius Joseph Willem Peeters
- Consecration: 6 January 1980 by John Paul II
- Created cardinal: 28 June 1988 by John Paul II
- Rank: Cardinal-Priest

Personal details
- Born: Christian Wiyghan Tumi; 15 October 1930 Kikaikelaki, Cameroons
- Died: 3 April 2021 (aged 90) Douala, Cameroon
- Education: University of Fribourg
- Motto: Me voici je viens faire ta volonté
- Coat of arms

Styles of Christian Cardinal Tumi
- Reference style: His Eminence
- Spoken style: Your Eminence
- Informal style: Cardinal
- See: Douala

Christian Wiyghan Tumi (15 October 1930 – 3 April 2021) was a Cameroonian prelate of the Catholic Church who was archbishop of Douala from 1991 to 2009. He was bishop of Yagoua from 1980 to 1982. After serving as coadjutor bishop of Garoua beginning in 1982, he was bishop there from 1984 to 1991. He was made a cardinal 1988. Tumi was the first and so far the only cardinal from Cameroon.

== Early life and ordination ==
Born on 15 October 1930 in Kikaikelaki, a small village near Kumbo, in the Nso clan of the Northwest Region of Cameroon, Tumi studied at local seminaries in Cameroon and Nigeria. He trained as a teacher in Nigeria and London, then earned a licentiate in theology in the Catholic University of Lyon and a doctorate in philosophy at the University of Fribourg, Switzerland. He was ordained a priest of the Diocese of Buéa on 17 April 1966, and then served as a Vicar in Soppo for a year before becoming a professor at Bishop Rogan College's seminary. After studying abroad from 1969 to 1973, he returned to his diocese and was named rector of the seminary in Bambui.

== Bishop and cardinal ==
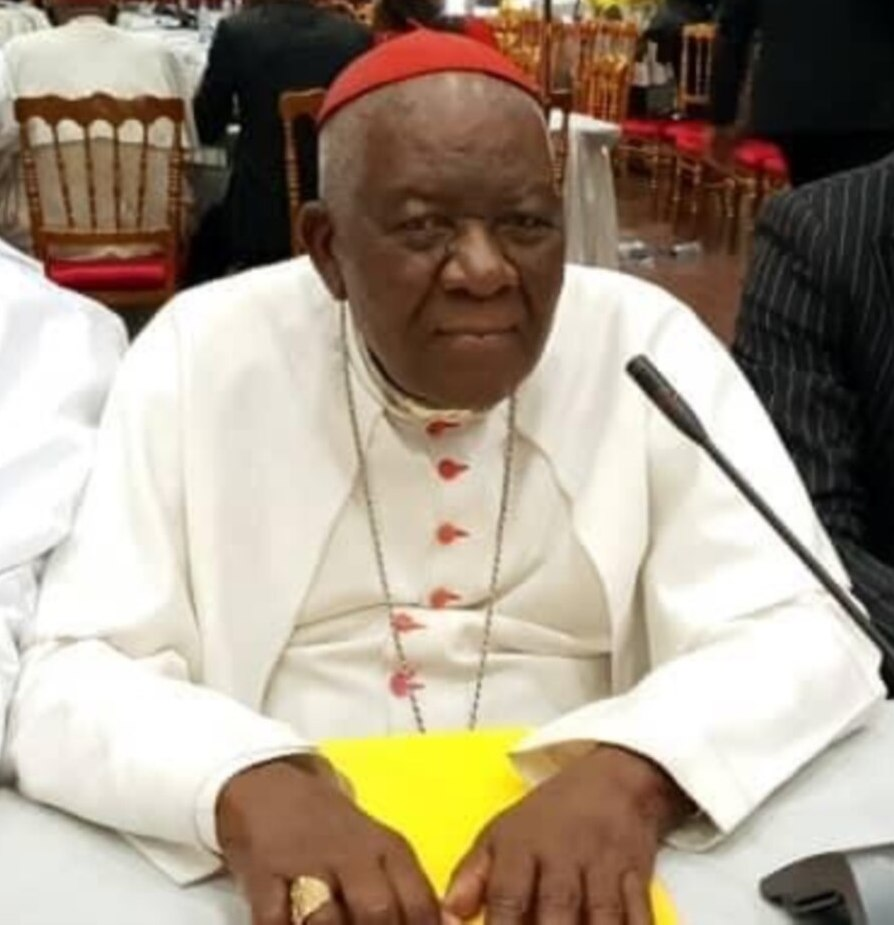
Cardinal Tumi Grand Dialogue (cropped)

On 6 December 1979, Tumi was appointed the first bishop of the Diocese of Yagoua. He received his episcopal consecration on 6 January 1980 from Pope John Paul II. On 19 November 1982 he was named archbishop coadjutor of Garoua and he succeeded as archbishop there when his predecessor's resignation was accepted on 17 March 1984.

In 1982 he was elected vice president of the National Episcopal Conference of Cameroon and in 1985 its president, a post he held until 1991.

Pope John Paul II made him a cardinal on 28 June 1988, assigning him as Cardinal-Priest the title of Santi Martiri dell'Uganda a Poggio Ameno on 28 June 1988. On 6 July 1991 he was named a member of the Pontifical Council for Dialogue with Non-Believers. Tumi was named the Archbishop of Douala on 31 August 1991. He was one of the cardinal electors who participated in the 2005 papal conclave that elected Pope Benedict XVI.

Tumi was critical of the government's attempt to suppress Anglophone culture in Cameroon and advocated a federation to allow the Francophone and Anglophone regions to coexist in Cameroon.

In 2009, Tumi led thousands in a march in Douala to protest Cameroon's endorsement of the Maputo Protocol, a women's rights charter promoted by the African Union. Critics of the document believe it will ease restrictions on abortion and promote homosexuality. In a 2007 sermon he denounced child sexual abuse as a scandal and the shame of contemporary society. In 2005, Tumi told an interviewer that the use of condoms as protection against AIDS within marriage "makes sense", though he doubted the Church's prohibition on their use would change.

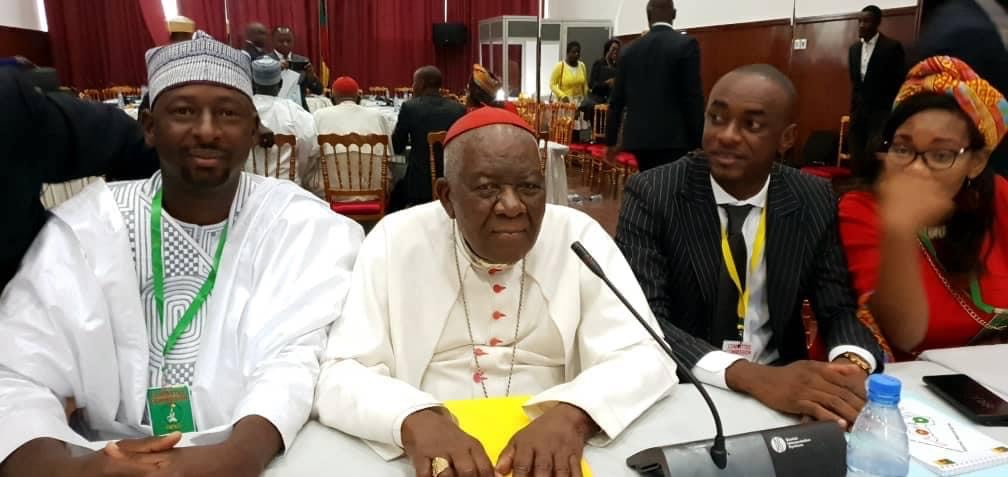
Cardinal Tumi Grand Dialogue

Tumi was kidnapped on 5 November 2020, and released unharmed on 6 November 2020; his captors released video footage of their interrogation of Tumi.

== Death ==
Tumi died in a hospital in Douala on 3 April 2021 in the early hours following an illness. After a video of his corpse in the hospital bed was released on the Internet; authorities denounced it as a violation of privacy and ordered an investigation.

Catholic Church titles
Preceded by Louis Charpenet	Bishop of Yagoua; 6 December 1979 – 19 November 1982	Succeeded by Antoine Ntalou
Preceded by Yves-Joseph-Marie Plumey	Archbishop of Garoua; 17 March 1984 – 31 August 1991	Succeeded by Antoine Ntalou
Preceded by Jean Zoa	President of the Episcopal Conference of Cameroon; 1985 – 1991	Succeeded by Jean-Baptiste Ama
Titular church created	Cardinal-Priest of Santi Martiri dell’Uganda a Poggio Ameno; 28 June 1988 – 2 April 2021	Succeeded by Peter Okpaleke
Preceded by Gabriel Gonsum Ganaka	President of Symposium of Episcopal Conferences of Africa and Madagascar; 1990 – 1994	Succeeded by Gabriel Gonsum Ganaka
Preceded by Simon Tonyé	Archbishop of Douala; 31 August 1991 – 17 November 2009	Succeeded by Samuel Kleda
