= Arenberg Convent =

German convent

Kloster Arenberg
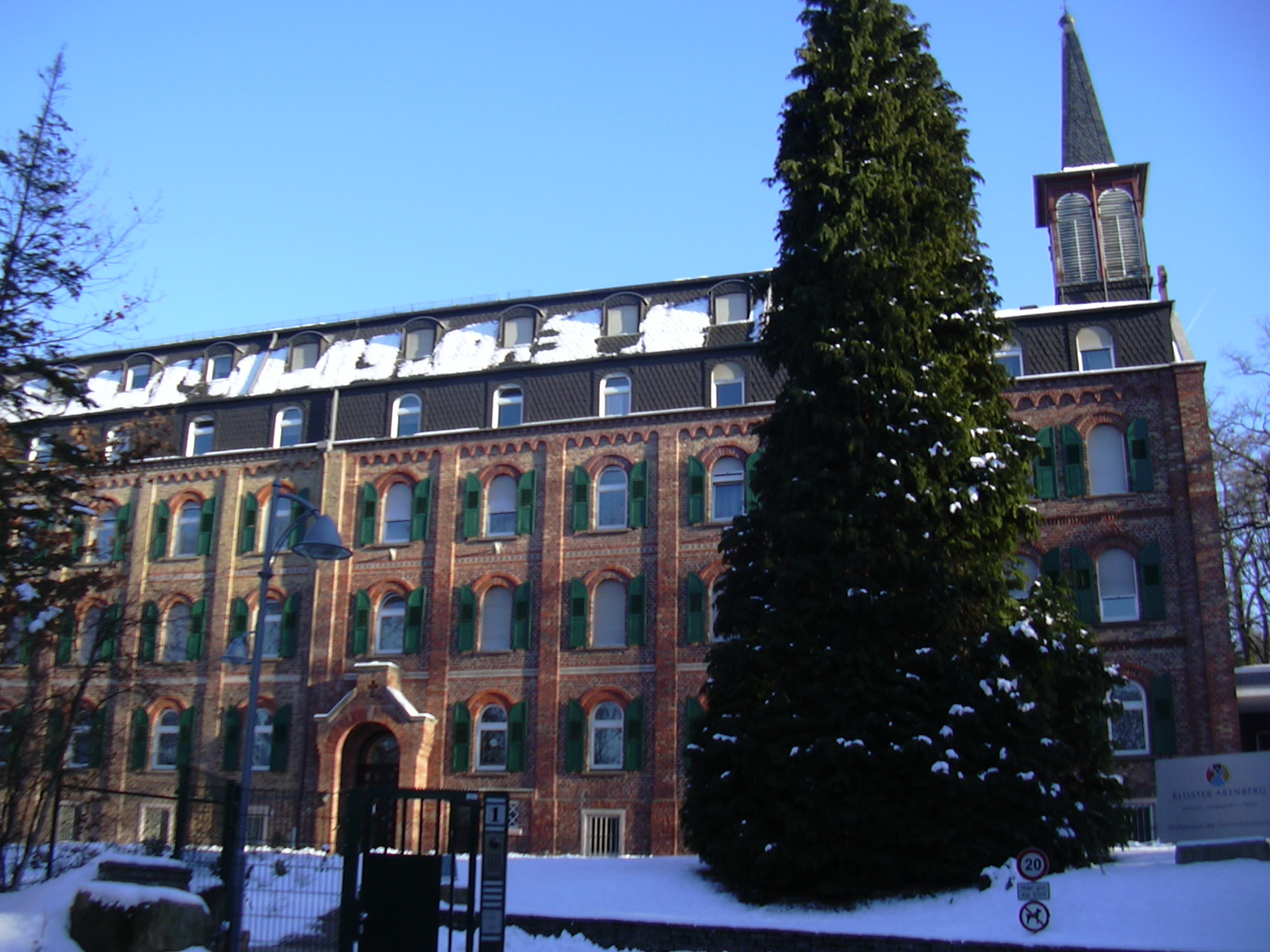
- Main building

Monastery information
- Order: Order of Saint Dominic
- Established: 1864

Architecture
- Status: Convent of nuns
- Functional status: active
- Heritage designation: World Heritage Site Rhine Gorge
- Designated date: 2002

Site
- Location: Koblenz-Arenberg, Rhineland-Palatinate, Germany

Arenberg Convent (German: Kloster Arenberg) is the mother house of the Arenberg Dominican Sisters in the Arenberg district of Koblenz, Rhineland-Palatinate, Germany. It is also a pilgrimage site and one of two active monasteries in the city. It has been part of the UNESCO World Heritage site Rhine Gorge since 2002.

== History ==
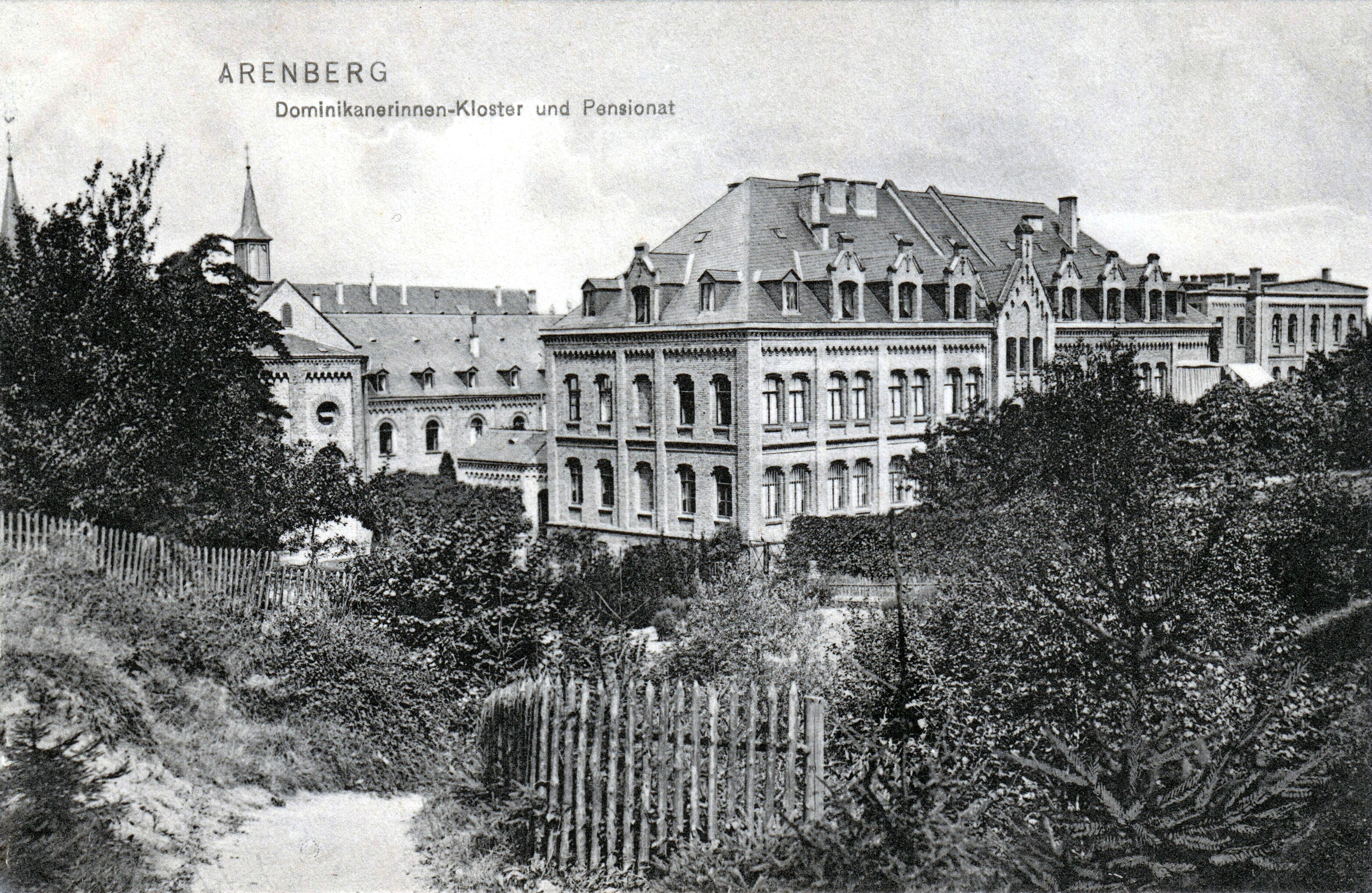
The convent around 1910

Memorial plate of the Arenberg Convent

The history of Kloster Arenberg dates back to 1864, when the parish priest Johann Baptist Kraus, who also commissioned the creation of the pilgrimage grounds that now bear his name, the "Pfarrer-Kraus-Anlagen", had a small convent building constructed. Following Pope Pius IX's approval for the establishment of a convent, it focused on education and nursing.

Kraus brought two sisters from Switzerland in 1868. They were tasked with residing there, maintaining the pilgrimage grounds, and carrying out social work within the local community. Cherubine Willimann, who had previously worked as a convent porter in Switzerland, arrived in Arenberg in 1868.

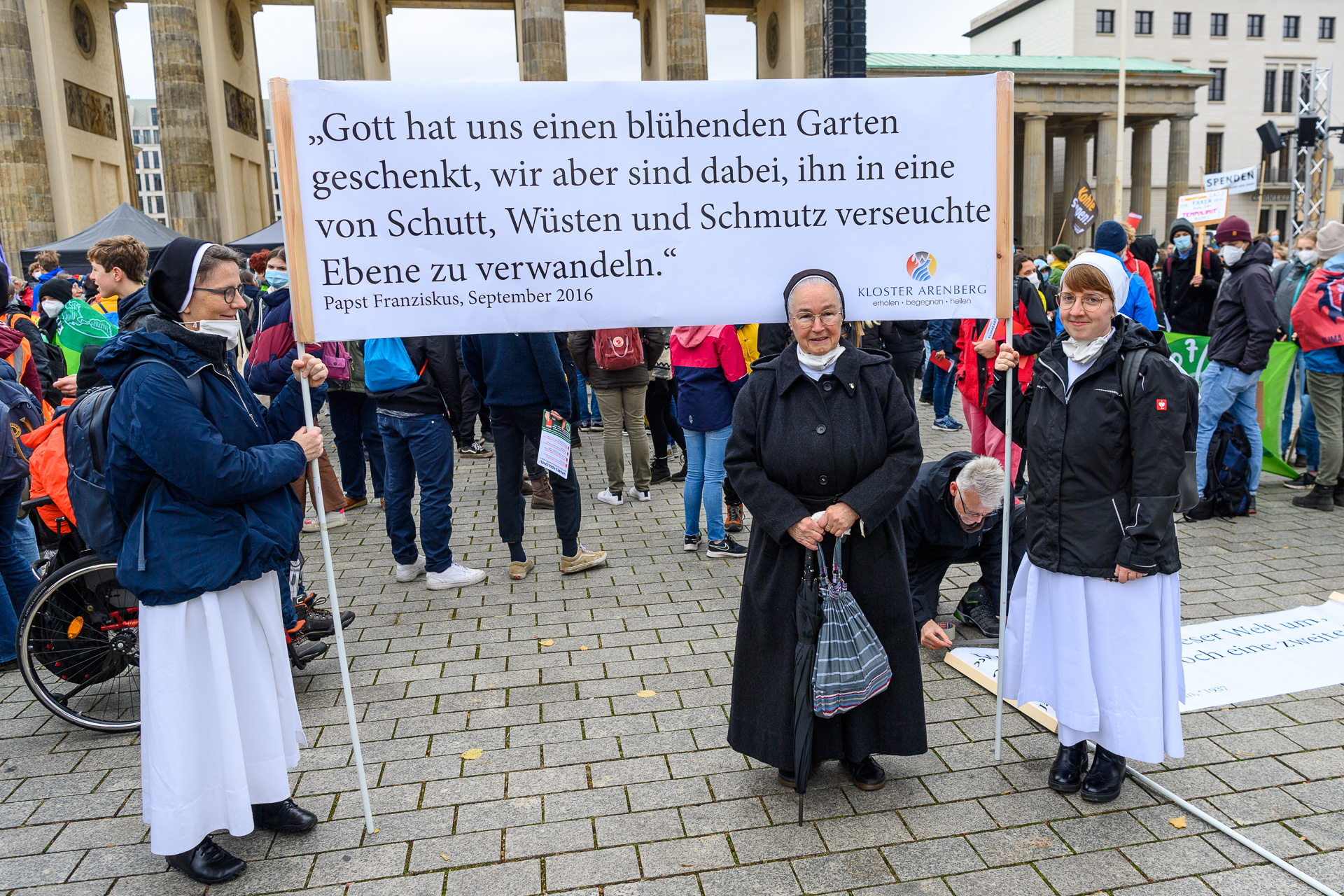
Public awareness of sisters of Kloster Arenberg in Phantasialand in Brühl

Within the Dominicans, tensions arose between those who favored an exclusively contemplative way of life and those who viewed their primary mission as social work.

== Description ==
The convent has a sanatorium, run with the Kneipp company, and a guesthouse for rehabilitation and recreation. The convent also offers a diverse range of educational programs and has a public library. Every summer, a promenade concert takes place, featuring sacred music and choral performances from various eras. A park next to the main building also includes a herb garden, common for Dominican monasteries and nunneries.

== Pfarrer-Kraus-Anlagen ==
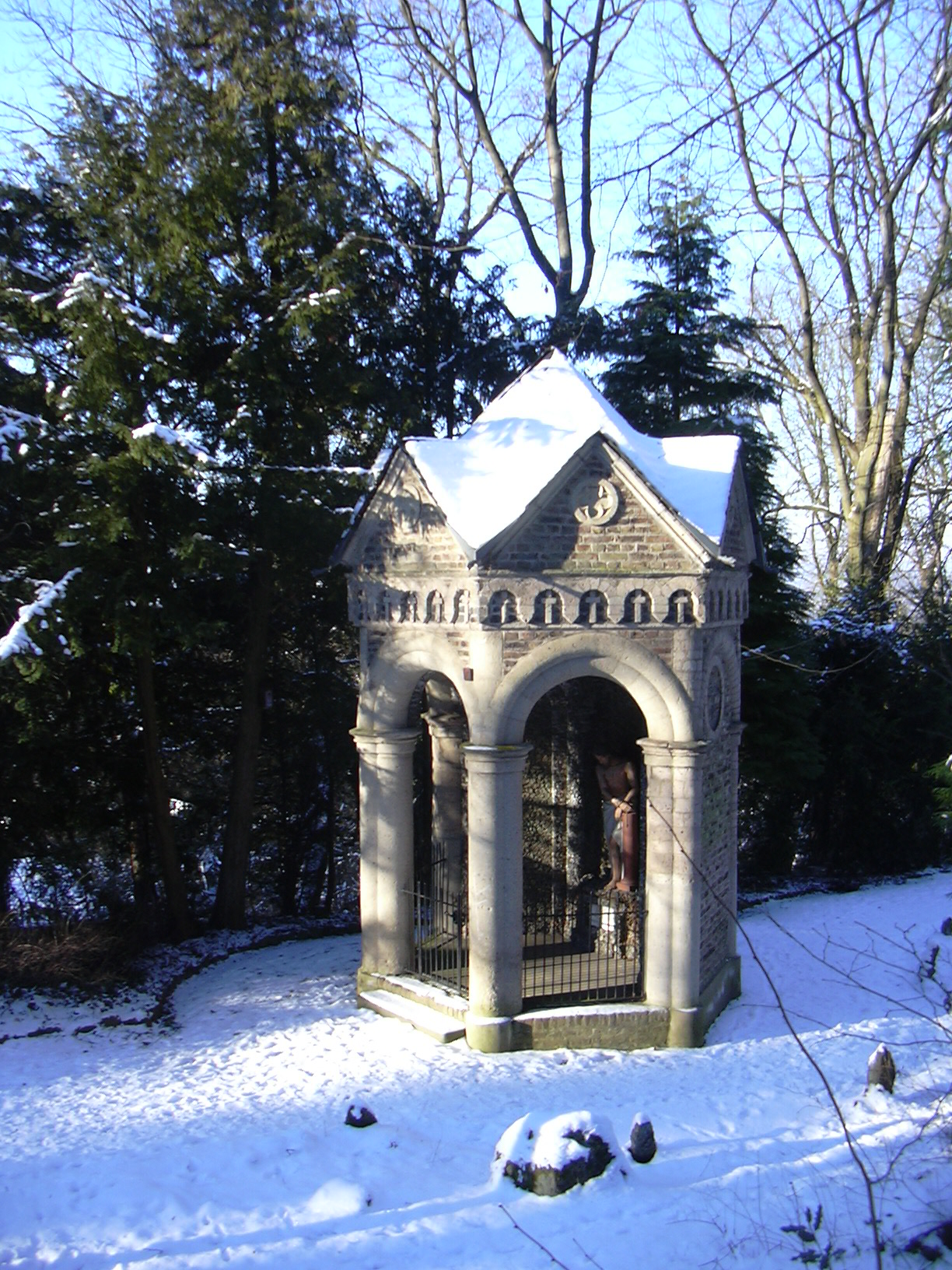
One of the sculptures within the Pfarrer-Kraus-Anlagen

The Pfarrer-Kraus-Anlagen are an open space located in a small forest that show the Stations of the Cross of Jesus. Since 1983, a registered association has been dedicated to their care and preservation. They are located directly adjacent to the monastery grounds but they belong to the Catholic church of Koblenz-Arenberg/Immendorf.

== Transport ==
The convent is connected to the public transport through the city bus lines 9 and N9 (Koblenz-Goldgrube – Koblenz Hbf – Koblenz-Ehrenbreitstein – Koblenz-Arenberg), stops Ringstr./Kloster and Arenberg Kirche and the local bus lines 460 and N46, stops Arenberg Kloster and Pfarrer Kraus Str. (Westerburg – Guckheim – Montabaur – Neuhäusel – Koblenz-Arenberg – Koblenz Ehrenbreitstein – Koblenz Hbf).
