= Pius Suh Awa =

Cameroonian Catholic bishop

- Bishop of Buéa
- Church: Catholic Church
- Diocese: Diocese of Buéa
- In office: 29 January 1973 – 30 November 2006
- Predecessor: Julius Joseph Willem Peeters
- Successor: Emmanuel Bushu

Orders
- Ordination: 21 December 1961
- Consecration: 30 May 1971 by Julius Joseph Willem Peeters

Personal details
- Born: 4 May 1930 Bamenda, Southern Cameroons, Mandatory British Cameroons, British Empire
- Died: 9 February 2014 (aged 83)

Pius Suh Awa (4 May 1930 – 9 February 2014) was a Catholic bishop in Cameroon.

Ordained to the priesthood in 1961, Awa was appointed coadjutor bishop of the Roman Catholic Diocese of Buéa in 1971 and became diocesan bishop in 1973. He retired in 2006.
