= Diocese of Maroua–Mokolo =

Roman Catholic diocese in Cameroon

Coordinates: 10.5962°N 14.3149°E

Notre-Dame Cathedral of Founangué in Maruoa

The Roman Catholic Diocese of Maroua–Mokolo (Latin: Maruan(us)–Mokolen(sis)) is a diocese located in the cities of Maroua and Mokolo in the ecclesiastical province of Garoua in Cameroon.

== History ==
- March 11, 1968: Established as Apostolic Prefecture of Maroua–Mokolo from the Diocese of Garoua
- January 29, 1973: Promoted as Diocese of Maroua–Mokolo

== Bishops ==
=== Ordinaries, in reverse chronological order ===
- Bishops of Maroua–Mokolo (Roman rite), below
  - Bishop Bruno Ateba Edo, S.A.C. (since April 5, 2014)
  - Bishop Philippe Albert Joseph Stevens † (November 11, 1994 – April 5, 2014)
  - Bishop Jacques Joseph François de Bernon, O.M.I. (January 29, 1973 – September 22, 1994); see below
- Prefect Apostolic of Maroua–Mokolo (Roman rite), below
  - Father Jacques Joseph François de Bernon, O.M.I. (March 11, 1968 – January 29, 1973); see above

=== Other priest of this diocese who became bishop ===
- Barthélemy Yaouda Hourgo, appointed Bishop of Yagoua in 2008

== See also ==
- Roman Catholicism in Cameroon
