= Joseph Djida =

Cameroonian Roman Catholic bishop

Joseph Djida OMI
- Bishop of Ngaoundéré
- Church: Catholic Church
- Diocese: Diocese of Ngaoundéré
- In office: 23 October 2000 – 6 January 2015
- Predecessor: Jean-Marie-Joseph-Augustin Pasquier
- Successor: Emmanuel Abbo

Orders
- Ordination: 5 December 1976
- Consecration: 25 February 2001 by Félix del Blanco Prieto

Personal details
- Born: 8 April 1945 Mayo-Darlé, Mandatory Territory of Cameroun, French Empire
- Died: 6 January 2015 (aged 69)

Joseph Djida, OMI (8 April 1945 – 6 January 2015) was a Roman Catholic bishop.

Ordained to the priesthood in 1976, Ateba was appointed the second bishop of the Roman Catholic Diocese of Ngaoundéré, Cameroon, in 2000. He died while still in office.
