= Diocese of Yagoua =

Roman Catholic diocese in Cameroon

Coordinates: 10.3356°N 15.2409°E

Diocese of Yagoua Dioecesis Yaguana Diocèse de Yagoua

Location
- Country: Cameroon
- Metropolitan: Archdiocese of Garoua
- Headquarters: Yagoua, Far North Region, Cameroon

Statistics
- Area: 22,469 km^{2} (8,675 sq mi)
- Population: Total; Catholics: (as of 2022); 2,188,375; 130,354 (6.0%)
- Parishes: 30

Information
- Denomination: Catholic Church
- Sui iuris church: Latin Church
- Rite: Roman Rite
- Established: 11 March 1968; 58 years ago
- Secular priests: 57 (38 Diocesan, 19 Religious Orders)

Current leadership
- Pope: Leo XIV
- Bishop: Barthélemy Yaouda Hourgo
- Metropolitan Archbishop: Faustin Ambassa Ndjodo, C.I.C.M.

Map
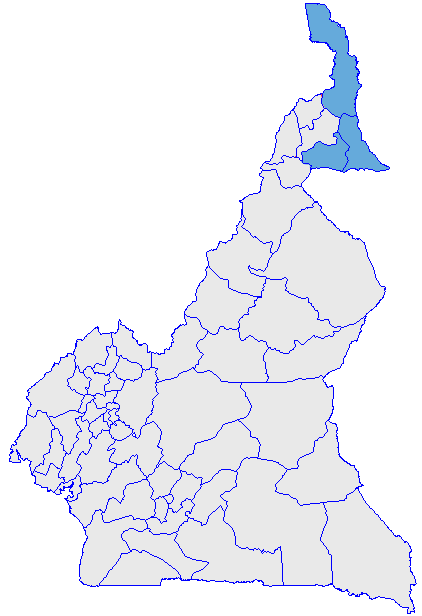

The Roman Catholic Diocese of Yagoua (Latin: Yaguan(us)) is a diocese located in the city of Yagoua in the ecclesiastical province of Garoua in Cameroon.

== History ==
- 11 March 1968: Established as Apostolic Prefecture of Yagoua from the Diocese of Garoua
- 29 January 1973: Promoted as Diocese of Yagoua

== Leadership ==
Prefect Apostolic of Yagoua (Roman rite)

- Louis Charpenet, O.M.I. (11 March 1968 – 29 January 1973 see below)

Bishops of Yagoua (Roman rite)

- Louis Charpenet, O.M.I. (see above 29 January 1973 – 5 December 1977)
- Christian Tumi (6 December 1979 – 19 November 1982), appointed Coadjutor Archbishop of Garoua
- Antoine Ntalou (19 November 1982 – 23 January 1992), appointed Archbishop of Garoua
- Emmanuel Bushu (17 December 1992 – 30 November 2006), appointed Bishop of Buéa
- Barthélemy Yaouda Hourgo (31 May 2008 – Present)

== See also ==
- Roman Catholicism in Cameroon
