= Hachenburg Friary =

Coordinates: 50°39′40″N 7°49′27″E

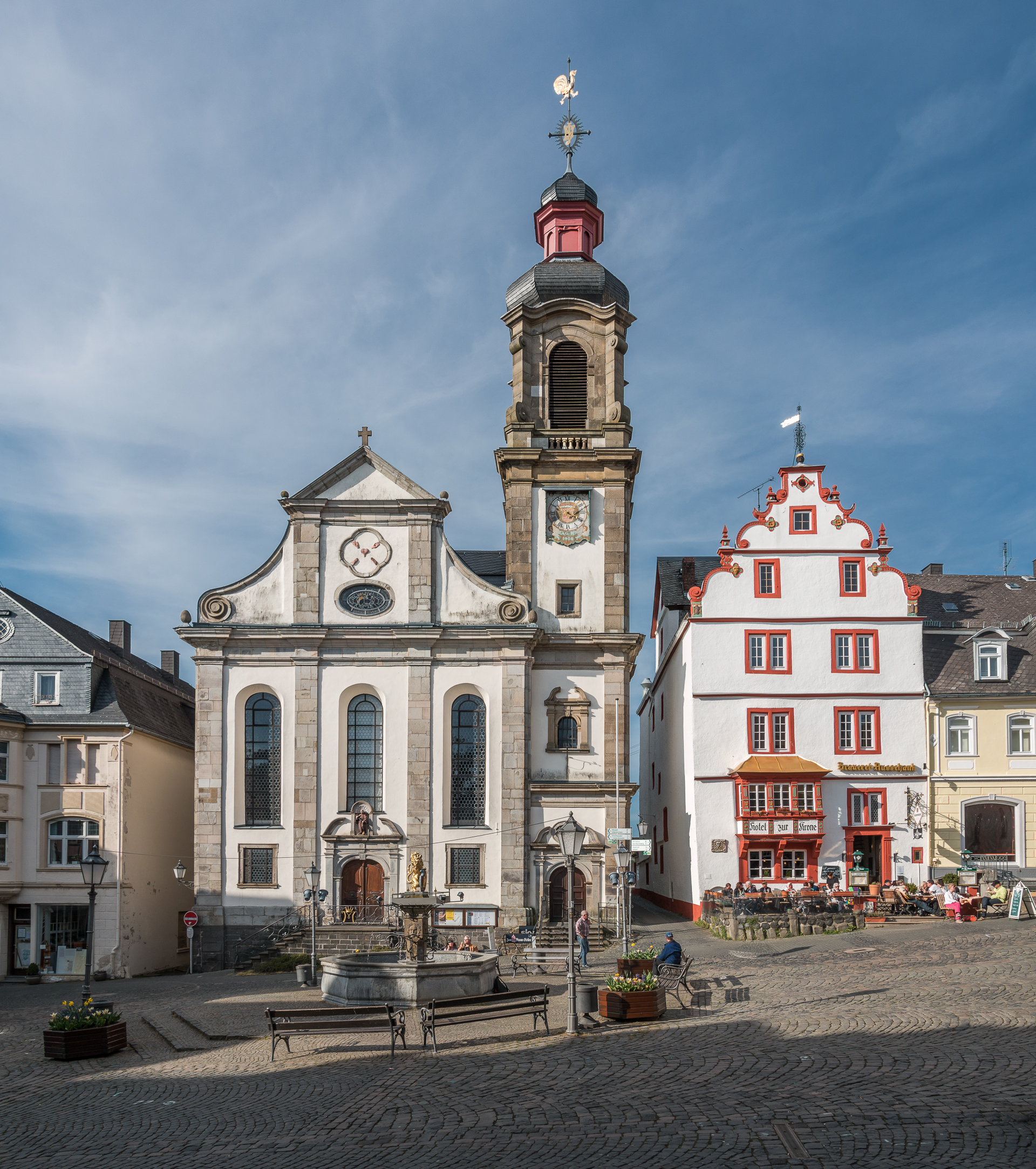
The Church of the Assumption of Mary (Maria Himmelfahrt), the former Franciscan church on the Alten Markt in Hachenburg

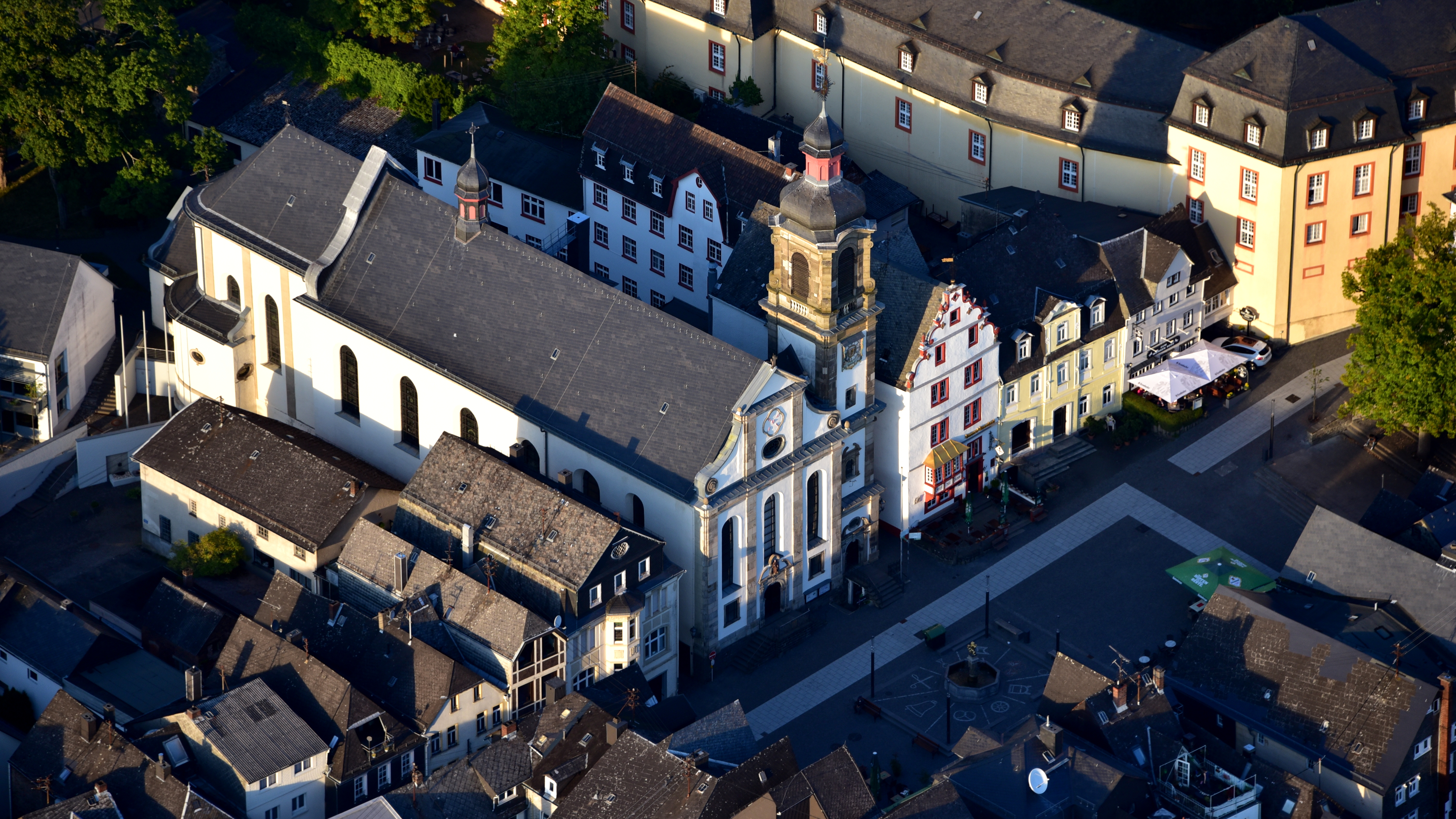
Hachenburg, Maria Himmelfahrt: 2016 aerial photograph

Hachenburg Friary (German: Franziskanerkloster Hachenburg) was a friary of the Franciscan order in Hachenburg in the district of Westerwaldkreis, Rhineland-Palatinate, Germany. This community of Observant Friars belonged to the Thuringian Franciscan Province of Saint Elisabeth. It was founded in 1663, while the Franciscan church was rebuilt between 1729 and 1739. The friary was closed in 1813 and subsequently demolished except for the church, which remains as the Catholic parish church of the Assumption (Mariä Himmelfahrt).

== See also ==
- List of Christian monasteries in Rhineland-Palatinate
- List of Christian monasteries in Germany
