= Michael Miabesue Bibi =

Cameroonian Catholic prelate (born 1971)

The Most Reverend Michael Miabesue Bibi
- Bishop of Buéa, Cameroon
- Church: Catholic Church
- Archdiocese: Roman Catholic Archdiocese of Bamenda
- See: Diocese of Buea
- Appointed: 5 January 2021
- Installed: 25 February 2021
- Predecessor: Emmanuel Bushu (30 November 2006 - 28 December 2019)
- Successor: Incumbent
- Other posts: Auxiliary Bishop of the Archdiocese of Bamenda (24 January 2017 - 5 January 2021); Apostolic Administrator of the Diocese of Buéa (28 December 2019 - 5 January 2021)

Orders
- Ordination: 26 April 2000
- Consecration: 25 March 2017 by Cornelius Fontem Esua
- Rank: Bishop

Personal details
- Born: Michael Miabesue Bibi; 28 July 1971 (age 55) Bamessing, Archdiocese of Bamenda, Northwest Region, Cameroon

Styles of Michael Miabesue Bibi
- Reference style: Your Lordship; The Most Reverend
- Spoken style: His Lordship
- Religious style: Bishop

Michael Miabesue Bibi (born 28 July 1971) is a Cameroonian Catholic prelate who is the bishop of the Roman Catholic Diocese of Buéa, in Cameroon, since 5 January 2021. Before that, he served as Auxiliary Bishop of the Archdiocese of Bamenda, in Cameroon from 24 January 2017 until 5 January 2021. He was appointed bishop by Pope Francis. He was concurrently appointed Titular Bishop of Amudarsa. His episcopal consecration took place on 25 March 2017 at Bamenda by the hands of Cornelius Fontem Esua, Archbishop of Bamenda. On 5 January 2021, The Holy Father transferred him to the Diocese of Buéa and appointed him local ordinary there. While auxiliary bishop at Bamenda, he served as Apostolic Administrator at Buéa from 28 December 2019 until 5 January 2021. He was installed as local ordinary at Buéa on 25 February 2021.

== Background and education ==
He was born on 28 July 1971 in Bamessing, Archdiocese of Bamenda, Northwest Region, Cameroon. He studied philosophy and theology at the Saint Thomas Aquinas Major Seminary of Bambui, in Bamenda. He holds a Master's degree in Theology with specialization in catechetics, awarded by the Maryvale Institute, in Birmingham, England, United Kingdom, in 2008.

== Priest ==
He was ordained a priest on 26 April 2000 for the Archdiocese of Bamenda. He served as a priest until 24 January 2017. While a priest, he served in various roles and locations, including:

- Assistant priest at Saint Jude, in Fundong, Cameroon from 2000 until 2001.
- Assistant priest at Saint Matthias, in Widikum, Cameroon from 2001 until 2003.
- Assistant priest at Saint Joseph, in Mankon, Cameroon from 2003 until 2004.
- Studies at the Maryvale Institute in Birmingham, England leading to the award of a master's in theology, with a specialization in catechetics from 2004 until 2006.
- Assistant priest at Saint Joseph, in Mankon from 2006 until 2007.
- Parish Ministry in Saint Joseph Parish, in Bafut and in All Saints' Parish from 2006 until 2008.
- Chaplain of the Sacred Heart College in Mankon from 2006 until 2007.
- Chaplain of Saint Paul College of Nkwen, Cameroon from 2007 until 2008.
- Assistant Archdiocesan Financial Secretary and diocesan Chancellor from 2009 until 2011.
- Special Assistant to the Archbishop of Bamenda from 2012 until 2015.
- Secretary Chancellor of the Archdiocese of Bamenda from 2015 until 2017.

== Bishop ==
On 24 January 2017, Pope Francis appointed Reverend Father Michael Miabesue Bibi, previously a member of the clergy of Bamenda, Cameroon as Auxiliary Bishop of the Archdiocese of Bamenda. He assigned him the title of Titular Bishop of Amudarsa. He was consecrated bishop and installed at Saint Joseph Cathedral, Bamenda on 25 March 2017, by the hands of Cornelius Fontem Esua, Archbishop of Bamenda assisted by Agapitus Enuyehnyoh Nfon, Bishop of Kumba and George Nkuo, Bishop of Kumbo. In December 2019, following the age-related resignation of Bishop Emmanuel Bushi, The Holy Father appointed Bishop Bibi as apostolic administrator at Buéa, in addition to his duties as auxiliary bishop at Bamenda.

On 5 January 2021, Pope Francis transferred him to Buéa, and appointed him as the local ordinary there. He was installed at Buéa on 25 February 2021.

== See also ==
- Catholic Church in Cameroon

== Succession table ==
Catholic Church titles
Preceded by	Auxiliary Bishop of Bamenda (24 January 2017 - 5 January 2021)	Succeeded by
Preceded by Emmanuel Bushu (30 November 2006 - 28 December 2019)	Bishop of Buéa (since 5 January 2021)	Succeeded by Incumbent
