= Hachenburg =

- Town
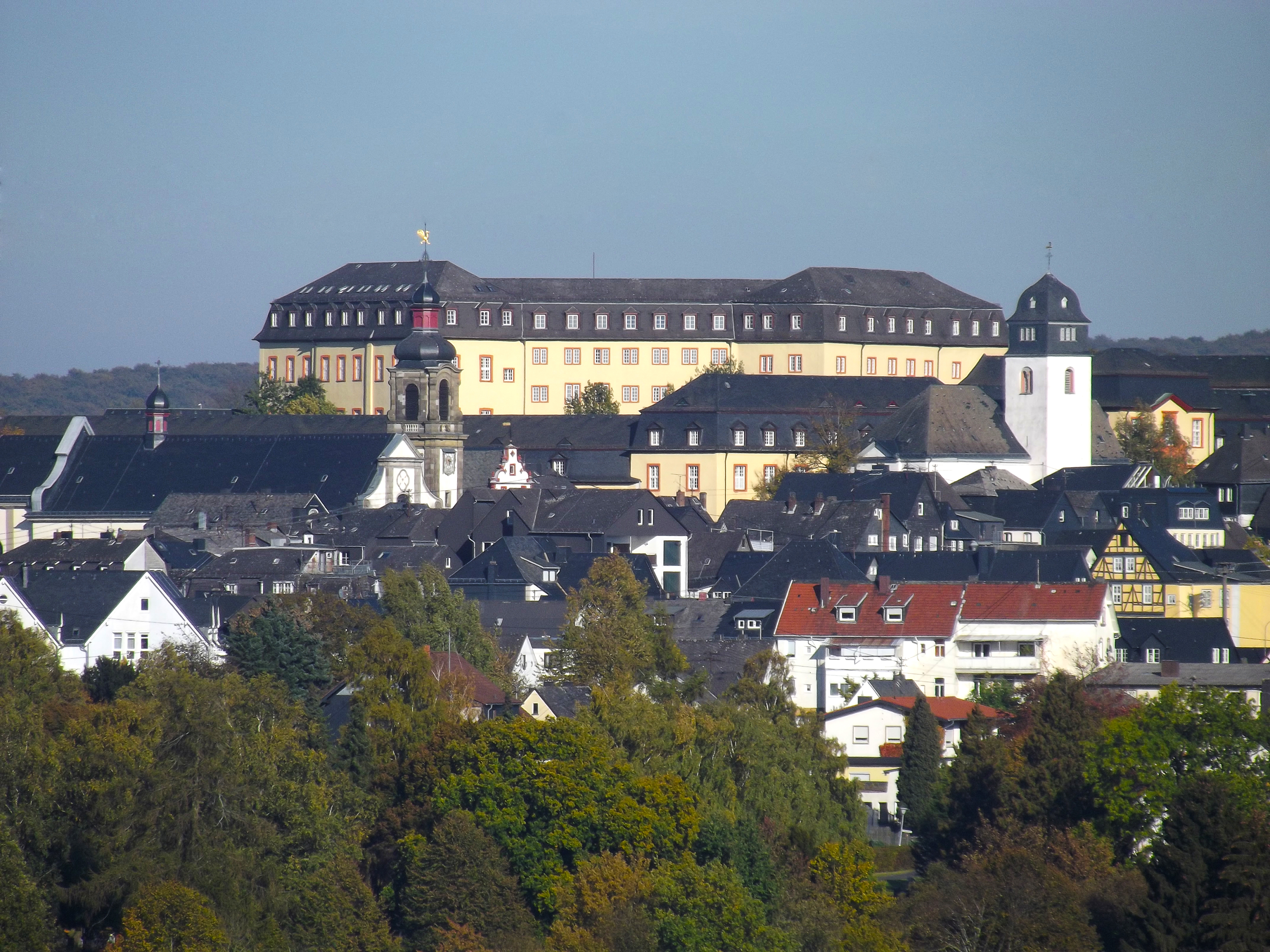
- Hachenburg Castle

- Coat of arms

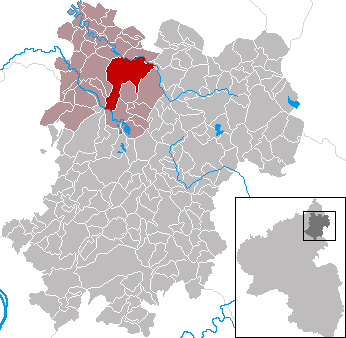
- Location of Hachenburg within Westerwaldkreis district
- Interactive map of Hachenburg
- Location within Germany Location within Rhineland-Palatinate
- Coordinates: 50°39′41″N 7°49′13″E
- Country: Germany
- State: Rhineland-Palatinate
- District: Westerwaldkreis
- Municipal assoc.: Hachenburg

Government
  - Mayor (2019–24): Stefan Leukel (CDU)

Area
  - Total: 21.43 km^{2} (8.27 sq mi)
- Elevation: 350 m (1,150 ft)

Population (2025-12-31)
  - Total: 6,390
  - Density: 298/km^{2} (772/sq mi)
- Time zone: UTC+01:00 (CET)
  - Summer (DST): UTC+02:00 (CEST)
- Postal codes: 57627
- Dialling codes: 02662
- Vehicle registration: WW
- Website: www.hachenburg.de

Hachenburg (German pronunciation: [ˈhaxn̩bʊʁk]) is a town in the Westerwaldkreis in Rhineland-Palatinate, Germany.

== Geography ==
The town lies in the Westerwald between Koblenz and Siegen, roughly 10 km west of Bad Marienberg on the river Nister. Hachenburg is the administrative seat of the Verbandsgemeinde of Hachenburg, a kind of collective municipality (See Verbandsgemeinde).

== History ==
=== The castle and the town ===
The castle (Schloss), former seat of the Counts of Sayn, was founded about 1180 by Count Heinrich II of Sayn.

Building was finished in 1212 under Count Heinrich III, the founder's son, who was also mentioned as the town's and the castle's first owner. At the same time, under the Count's overlordship, came the building of the neighbouring Cistercian Marienstatt Abbey.

In 1314, Hachenburg, whose name comes from a castle hill protected by thornbushes, was granted town rights. The original settlement lay not on the 390-m-high castle hill, but rather some 1.5 km away in the dale about 100 m lower through which runs the Rothbach, on the site of what is now the outlying constituent community of Altstadt (which explains its name – Altstadt is German for “Old Town”), which had its first documentary mention in 1343. The Romanesque St. Bartolomäuskirche, built there about 1200 and nowadays an Evangelical church is Hachenburg's oldest preserved building, followed by the Steinernes Haus (“Stone House”), known as Zur Krone, from the 15th century, at the Old Market (Alter Markt) in the town centre. The castle church only arose in the late 15th century and underwent several remodellings until the 18th century. The Catholic Church of the Assumption of Mary, from the early 18th century, belonged at first to a Franciscan friary, but later, in 1813, became the parish church. In the Middle Ages, the town's population was most likely never more than about 500 to 1,000, and in the 17th and 18th centuries it was between 1,000 and 1,500. Only after the Second World War did this small town's population reach first 3,000, and nowadays almost 6,000.

On 13 October 1654, there was a great town fire in which not only did a great deal of the inner town burn down, but also the castle. Counts Salentin von Manderscheid and Georg Friedrich von Sayn-Hachenburg undertook to build the town anew, and also the castle, although this time as a Baroque structure. The inner town today still bears the shape that they gave it. Most of the lovely timber-frame houses on Friedrichstraße, Herrnstraße, the Old Market, Perlgasse, Mittelstraße, Judengasse and Wilhelmstraße come from the 17th and 18th centuries. The sweeping Baroque castle was built to architect Julius Ludwig Rothweil's plans between 1715 and 1746. It has had many owners over the last century. For a few decades, however, it has been the seat of Deutsche Bundesbank’s training centre and professional college.

In the Second World War, Hachenburg was largely spared any great damage, but other disasters had ravaged it in the past. There were several great fires (in 1400, 1439, 1484, 1541, 1594 and 1654), and war beset the town several times, bringing suffering, especially the Thirty Years' War (1618–1648), the Seven Years' War (1756–1763) and both the so-called Coalition Wars (1792–1797 and 1799–1802).

In 1799, after the last count’s death, the county passed to Nassau-Weilburg, and Hachenburg lost its status as a Residenzstadt.

=== Past Jewish life ===
The Jewish graveyard was first mentioned in 1587 as a Judenkirchhof (“Jews’ churchyard”). Eighty-three graves can still be found today, among them some double graves. Most of the still preserved graves were made by Hachenburg stonemason and sculptor Wilhelm Sax (16 August 1891 – 26 June 1955). Other stonemasonry works were done by Albert Mai (31 December 1891 – 15 March 1976) and his son Herbert Mai (born 5 March 1925), who was later Wilhelm Sax's son-in-law. In 1913, 126 Jews lived in Hachenburg; in 1932 there were 99.

== Politics ==
The municipal council is made up of 23 council members, including the extraofficial mayor (Bürgermeister), who were elected in a municipal election on 7 June 2009.

	SPD	CDU	Grüne	FDP	FW	Total
2004	7	8	1	1	5	22 seats

== Culture ==
Hachenburg is home toare institutions such as the Landschaftsmuseum Westerwald (“Westerwald Landscape Museum”) and the notably well equipped town library.

=== Theatre ===
- Varied year round events by the municipal culture department, the Hachenburger Kulturzeit
- The Figurentheaterfestival (puppet shows), held every other year in autumn
- Hachenburger Kunstwoche (“Art Week”), likewise held every other year
- The year round Kleinkunstprogramm (“Cabaret Programme”), at which almost every great name in cabaret and chanson has been a guest.

=== Music ===
- Schlosskonzerte (“castle concerts”) by the Hachenburger Kulturkreis (“culture circle”) from August to April, with prominent chamber music and jazz concerts
- Orgelkonzerte (“organ concerts”) at the Evangelical castle church and the Catholic parish church
- The concerts by the Marienstatter Musikkreis (“music circle”) with an impressive yearly programme of spiritual music
- The summertime musical series Treffpunkt Alter Markt (“meeting place Old Market”) every Thursday evening
- The yearly benefit concert "Umsonst & Drinnen" at the Stadthalle (“town hall” – an event venue, not the administrative building)

=== Regular events ===
- The town's biggest traditional folk festival, the Hachenburger Kirmes, takes place each year on the weekend of the second Sunday in August. On Saturday evening, Hachenburgers and their guests gather at their Old Market to raise their kermis tree amid much music and witty speeches. A fortnight later, Altstadt follows suit with its own kermis with its own special customs.
- Moreover, there is yet another series of further events by, among others, clubs, the Werbering Hachenburg (“advertising ring”) and private event organizers, who round out the extensive offerings.
- The Burggartenfest (“Castle Garden Festival”), held every other year, is Rhineland-Palatinate's biggest themed festival with a diverse programme for the whole family.
- Each year on the first Saturday in November, the Katharinenmarkt is held. It is Rhineland-Palatinate's biggest one-day market.
- For three years now, on Altweiber (“Old Women’s Day”), the Carnival Session is held at the Stadthalle. This is organized by the local "Möhnenverein" (roughly, “Foolish Women’s Club”; it is part of the Carnival festivities).

== Transport ==
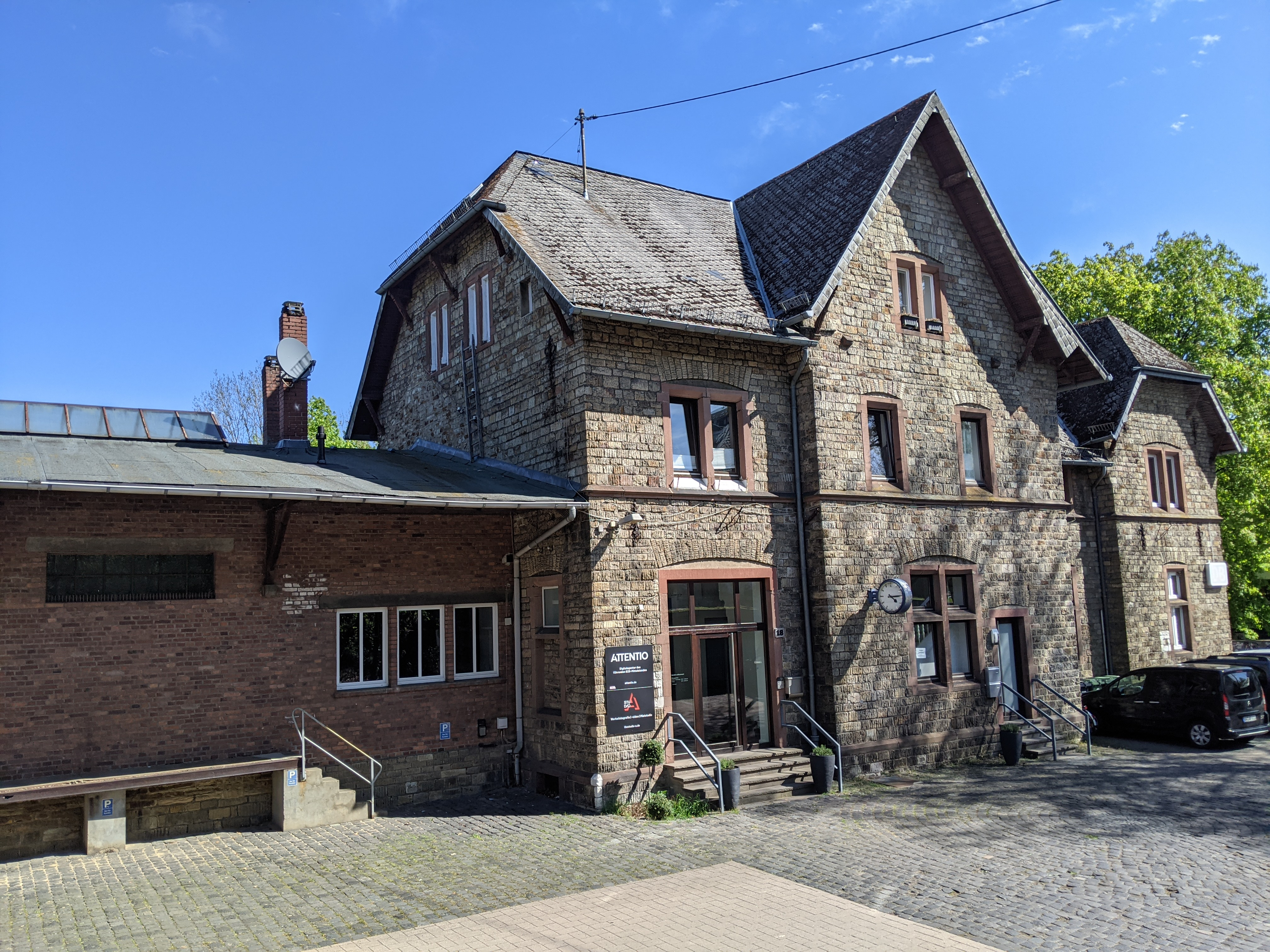
Hachenburg station

Hachenburg station lies on the RB90 line (Westerwald-Sieg-Bahn (Limburg (Lahn) - Diez Ost - Westerburg - Nistertal/Bad Marienberg - Hachenburg - Altenkirchen - Au (Sieg) - Kirchen - Siegen Hbf) of Hessische Landesbahn (HLB), section DreiLänderBahn).

The local bus lines 270, 408, 410, 411, 412, 413, 415, 417, 420, 430, 431, 433, 439, 449 and 483 connect Hachenburg to the public bus transport.

Hachenburg is located in the area of the transport association Verkehrsverbund Rhein-Mosel (VRM), zone 451.

From Limburg and Au (Sieg), the cities of Cologne, Koblenz, Frankfurt am Main and Wiesbaden may be reached directly.

Also in the past Hachenburg was served by the Selters - Hachenburg narrow gauge railway via Hattert and Höchstenbach to Selters, which was the interchange station to the Engers–Au railway, but the line to Selters has been deconstructed.

Hachenburg train station also has a park and ride parking lot which is usable for public transport users.

Hachenburg is located on Westerwaldsteig, a long distance walking path from Herborn via Rennerod, Westerburg, Bad Marienberg and Hachenburg to Bad Hönningen and at the Wiedweg, a path from Hachenburg via Altenkirchen to Leutesdorf at the Rhine.

== Education ==
- Hochschule der Deutschen Bundesbank (professional college)
- Grundschule Am Schloss Hachenburg (primary school)
- Grundschule Altstadt (primary school)
- Graf-Heinrich-Realschule
- Burggartenschule (special school whose main foci are learning and socio-emotional development)
- Schule am Rothenberg (special school whose main focus is speech)
- Duale Oberschule Hachenburg
- Landes Waldarbeiterschule (forestry school)

== Energy supply ==
A ten hektar large solar park has been constructed in the commercial area of Hachenburg.

== People ==
- Wolfram Christ (born 1955), violist and professor at the Hochschule für Musik Freiburg
- Albertine von Grün (born 1749; died 1792), letter write from the circle about the young Goethe
- Karl-Eberhard Hain (born 1960), jurist and professor at the Johannes Gutenberg University, Mainz
- Hendrik Hering (born 1964), Minister for Economics, Transport, Agriculture and Winemaking in Mainz
- Heribert Klein (born 1957; died 2005 in Limburg an der Lahn), journalist and organist
- Johann Daniel Müller (born 1716, died no earlier than 1786 presumably in Riga), court musician, cantor and school servant in Hachenburg, concert director in Frankfurt am Main in the young Goethe's social circle, Radical Pietist "prophet" and religious founder.
- Johannes Schröder (born 1991), organist, composer and Catholic church musician
- Ewald Schnug (born 1954), agricultural researcher, professor, Honorary-President of the International Scientific Center for Fertilizers
- Rolf Steinhaus (born 1916; died 2004 in Bad Neuenahr-Ahrweiler), Vice-Admiral in the Bundesmarine
