= Brandenburg Medical School Theodor Fontane =

Private university in Germany

- Medizinische Hochschule Brandenburg Theodor Fontane
- Established: October 28, 2014
- Location: Brandenburg, Germany; 52°54′23″N 12°47′50″E
- Website: www.mhb-fontane.de/en/home

Brandenburg Medical School Theodor Fontane (German: Medizinische Hochschule Brandenburg Theodor Fontane) is a private university in Germany.

The university is named after the German novelist and poet Theodor Fontane.

== History ==
The Brandenburg Medical School "Theodor Fontane" was founded in 2014 by municipal and non-profit institutions in Bernau, Brandenburg an der Havel and Neuruppin to train more physicians for the region of Brandenburg.

The first cohort of 36 physicians graduated in August 2021.

== See also ==
- Medical schools in Germany
