= Diocese of Ngaoundéré =

Roman Catholic diocese in Cameroon

Coordinates: 7.3206°N 13.5743°E

The Roman Catholic Diocese of Ngaoundéré (Latin: Ngaunderen(sis)) is a diocese located in the city of Ngaoundéré in the ecclesiastical province of Garoua in Cameroon.

== History ==
- November 19, 1982: Established as Diocese of Ngaoundéré from the Metropolitan Archdiocese of Garoua

== Leadership ==
- Bishops of Ngaoundéré (Roman rite), in reverse chronological order
  - Bishop Emmanuel Abbo (March 15, 2016 – Present)
  - Bishop Joseph Djida, O.M.I. (October 23, 2000 - January 6, 2015)
  - Bishop Jean-Marie-Joseph-Augustin Pasquier, O.M.I. (November 19, 1982 – October 23, 2000)

== See also ==
- Roman Catholicism in Cameroon
