= Mabanga =

Coordinates: 4°13′N 9°40′E

- Commune and town
- Interactive map of Mabanga
- Country: Cameroon
- Time zone: UTC+1 (WAT)

Mabanga is a town and commune in Cameroon, located near Dibombari

== See also ==
- Communes of Cameroon
