= Mbe, Cameroon =

Mbe
- Commune and town
- Location in Cameroon
- Coordinates: 7.860°N 13.593°E
- Country: Cameroon
- Time zone: UTC+1 (WAT)

Mbe is a town and commune in Cameroon.

== Notable people ==
Emmanuel Abbo, Bishop in the Roman Catholic Diocese of Ngaoundéré

== See also ==
- Communes of Cameroon
