= Diocese of Buéa =

Roman Catholic diocese in Cameroon

Diocese of Buea Dioecesis Bueaensis

Location
- Country: Cameroon
- Metropolitan: Archdiocese of Bamenda
- Coordinates: 4.1566°N 9.2344°E

Statistics
- Area: 13,410 km^{2} (5,180 sq mi)
- Population: Total; Catholics: (as of 2004); 950,000; 289,542 (30.5%)

Information
- Rite: Latin Rite

Current leadership
- Pope: Leo XIV
- Bishop: Michael Miabesue Bibi
- Bishops emeritus: Emmanuel Bushu

The Diocese of Buea (Latin: Dioecesis Bueaensis) is a Latin Church diocese located in the city of Buea in the ecclesiastical province of Bamenda in Cameroon.

On January 5, 2021, Bishop Michael Miabesue Bibi, auxiliary bishop of the Archdiocese of Bamenda, was appointed Bishop of this diocese. He had been its Apostolic Administrator since December 28, 2019.

== History ==
- June 12, 1923: Established as Apostolic Prefecture of Buea from Apostolic Vicariate of Cameroun
- March 15, 1939: Promoted as Apostolic Vicariate of Buea
- April 18, 1950: Promoted as Diocese of Buea

== Leadership ==
Apostolic Prefects

- Father John William Campling, M.H.M. (August 6, 1923 – May 13, 1925)
- Father Peter Rogan, M.H.M. (June 26, 1925 – March 15, 1939)

Apostolic Vicars

- Bishop Peter Rogan, M.H.M. (March 15, 1939 – April 18, 1950)

Bishops

- Bishop Peter Rogan, M.H.M. (April 18, 1950 – August 18, 1961)
- Bishop Julius Joseph Willem Peeters, M.H.M. (June 4, 1962 – January 29, 1973)
- Bishop Pius Suh Awa (January 29, 1973 – November 30, 2006)
- Bishop Emmanuel Bushu (November 30, 2006 – December 28, 2019)
- Bishop Michael Miabesue Bibi (January 5, 2021 – present)

=== Coadjutor bishops ===
- Pius Suh Awa (1971-1973)

=== Other priests of this diocese who became bishops ===
- George Nkuo, appointed Bishop of Kumbo in 2006
- Andrew Nkea Fuanya, served as Bishop of Mamfe (25 January 2014 - 30 December 2019), appointed Archbishop of Bamenda, Cameroon since 30 December 2019.
- Aloysius Fondong Abangalo, appointed Bishop of Mamfe on 22 February 2022.

== See also ==
- Roman Catholicism in Cameroon
