= Zoétélé =

Coordinates: 3.2500°N 11.8833°E

- Commune and town
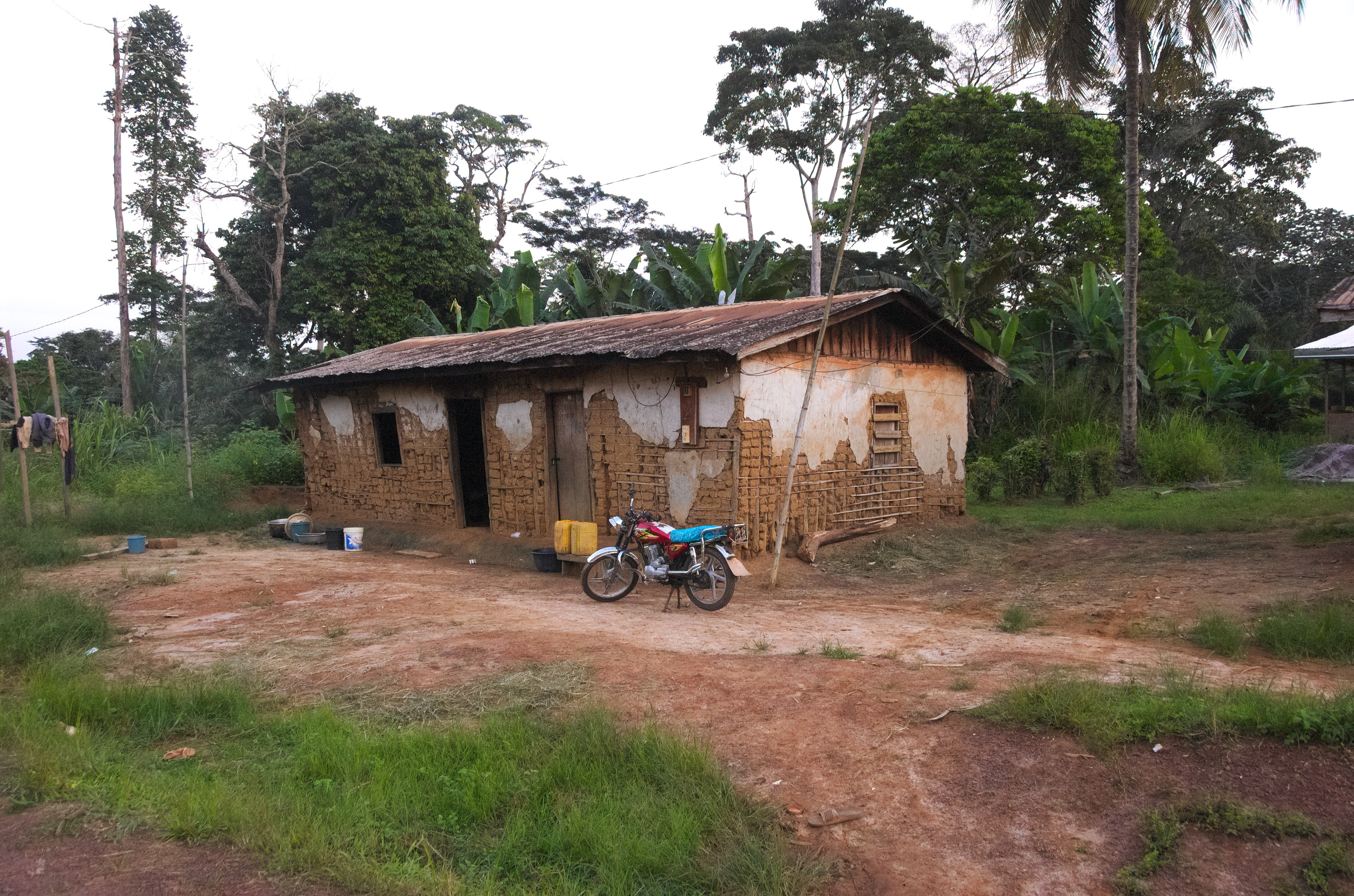
- Interactive map of Zoétélé
- Country: Cameroon
- Time zone: UTC+1 (WAT)

Zoétélé is a town and commune in Cameroon.

== See also ==
- Communes of Cameroon
