= Jean-Marie-Joseph-Augustin Pasquier =

French Catholic bishop

Jean-Marie-Joseph-Augustin Pasquier OMI
- Bishop of Ngaoundéré
- Church: Catholic Church
- Diocese: Diocese of Ngaoundéré
- In office: 19 November 1982 – 23 October 2000
- Predecessor: Diocese erected
- Successor: Joseph Djida
- Previous posts: Titular Bishop of Muzuca in Byzacena (1969-1982); Auxiliary Bishop of Garoua (1969-1982)

Orders
- Ordination: 19 November 1950
- Consecration: 1 August 1969 by Pope Paul VI

Personal details
- Born: 31 July 1924 Saint-Macaire-en-Mauges, Maine-et-Loire, France
- Died: 7 March 2004 (aged 79)

Jean-Marie-Joseph-Augustin Pasquier (31 July 1924 – 7 March 2004) was a French Catholic bishop who served in Cameroon.

Ordained to the priesthood in 1950, Pasquier was named auxiliary Bishop of Garoua in 1969 and then appointed the first bishop of the Roman Catholic Diocese of Ngaoundéré, Cameroon, in 1982. Pasquiere retired in 2000.
