= Vinzenz Pallotti University =

Coordinates: 50.4015°N 7.6266°E

The Vinzenz Pallotti University (until 2021 Philosophisch-Theologische Hochschule Vallendar (PTHV)) is a Roman Catholic private university in Vallendar, Germany, that originated as a religious university of the Pallottines. It is run as an ecclesiastically and state-recognized academic university under independent sponsorship.

== History ==
The predecessor of today's university was a theological training center founded in 1896/97 in Koblenz-Ehrenbreitstein, which moved to Limburg an der Lahn in 1898 and has been located in Vallendar near Koblenz as a theological university since 1945. The educational institution was established and managed by the order.

By decree of the Rhineland-Palatinate Ministry of the Interior on September 11, 1973, the religious college was given equal status to the universities of the state of Rhineland-Palatinate. In 1974, it was recognized by the Roman Congregation for Catholic Education, and in 1979 it received state recognition as an independent academic university. Since 1978, with ecclesiastical approval, a state-approved diploma program in theology has been conducted. In 1993, the educational institution was reestablished as the Philosophical-Theological College of the Society of the Catholic Apostolate (Pallottines), or PTHV for short. By decree of the Roman Congregation for Education of October 7, 1993, it was elevated to the status of a Faculty of Theology, which can confer all ecclesiastical academic degrees with canonical effects. State recognition of the licentiate and doctoral regulations followed in 1994, and in 1996 PTHV received ecclesiastically and state-recognized authority for habilitation.

In 2005, the sponsorship was reorganized and divided between the non-profit limited liability companies Vinzenz Pallotti gGmbH Friedberg and St. Elisabeth gGmbH Waldbreitbach, which were assigned to the religious orders of the Pallottine Fathers and the Franciscan Sisters of Waldbreitbach, respectively, and since then have been the two shareholders of the sponsoring company PTHV gGmbH. At the same time, a faculty for nursing science was established alongside the theological education. In 2009, new basic regulations were drawn up and approved by the Roman Congregation for Education, the Diocese of Trier and the Ministry for Science, Further Education and Culture in Mainz. By decree of the university's Grand Chancellor, Fritz Kretz, then Rector General of the Pallottine Fathers, the university was transformed into a Catholic University ("Universitas Catholica") in the same year and named "Philosophical-Theological University of Vallendar. Ecclesiastically and state-recognized academic university in free sponsorship". The PTHV gGmbH, based in Vallendar, remained the responsible body. In 2016, the doctoral regulations for the Ph.D. came into force, and in 2017, together with the revised basic regulations, the new regulations for the master's degree program, the doctorate and the licentiate were put into force.

At the end of 2020, the Waldbreitbach Franciscan Sisters with their Marienhaus Holding GmbH (the former St. Elisabeth gGmbH) withdrew from the sponsorship, which resulted in a realignment of the Pallottine University. According to the specifications of the Pallottine Province, the Faculty of Nursing Science will be closed, also in view of a changed market environment, and in its place, alongside the Faculty of Theology, a Faculty of Human Sciences will be established with degree programs in psychology, psychotherapy, leadership, coaching and social work, which began teaching in October 2022. According to the university, this is intended to strengthen value-oriented research and teaching. The name of the university was changed to St. Vincent Pallotti University in December 2021.
