= Archdiocese of Garoua =

Roman Catholic archdiocese in Cameroon

Coordinates: 9.3000°N 13.4000°E

Archdiocese of Garoua Archidioecesis Garuensis

Location
- Country: Cameroon
- Headquarters: Garoua

Statistics
- Area: 65,234 km^{2} (25,187 sq mi)
- Parishes: 35

Information
- Denomination: Catholic Church
- Sui iuris church: Latin Church
- Rite: Roman Rite
- Established: 9 January 1947; 79 years ago
- Cathedral: Cathédrale Sainte Thérèse
- Metropolitan Archbishop: Faustin Ambassa Ndjodo, CICM
- Suffragans: Maroua–Mokolo; Ngaoundéré; Yagoua
- Bishops emeritus: Antoine Ntalou

Map
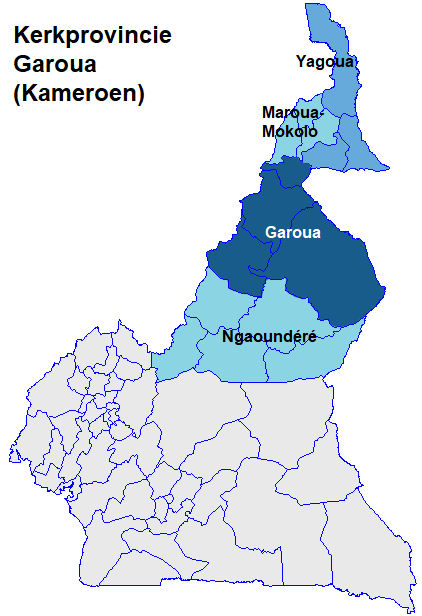
- Archdiocese of Garoua within Cameroon. Note that it is coterminous with North Region

The Roman Catholic Archdiocese of Garoua is the Metropolitan See for the ecclesiastical province of Garoua in Cameroon.

== History ==
- 9 January 1947: Established as Apostolic Prefecture of Garoua from the Apostolic Vicariate of Foumban
- 24 March 1953: Promoted as Apostolic Vicariate of Garoua
- 14 September 1955: Promoted as Diocese of Garoua
- 18 March 1982: Promoted as Metropolitan Archdiocese of Garoua

== Special churches ==
The seat of the archbishop is the Cathédrale Sainte Thérèse in Garoua.

== Bishops ==
=== Ordinaries ===
- Prefect Apostolic of Garoua (Roman rite)
  - Father Yves-Joseph-Marie Plumey, O.M.I. (25 March 1947 – 24 March 1953; see below)
- Vicar Apostolic of Garoua (Roman rite)
  - Bishop Yves-Joseph-Marie Plumey, O.M.I. (24 March 1953 – 14 September 1955; see above & below)
- Bishop of Garoua (Roman rite)
  - Bishop Yves-Joseph-Marie Plumey, O.M.I. (14 September 1955 – 18 March 1982; see above & below)
- Metropolitan Archbishops of Garoua (Roman rite)
  - Archbishop Yves-Joseph-Marie Plumey, O.M.I. (18 March 1982 – 17 March 1984; see above), resigned
  - Archbishop Christian Wiyghan Tumi (17 March 1984 – 31 August 1991 (Cardinal in 1988)), appointed Archbishop of Douala
  - Archbishop Antoine Ntalou (23 January 1992 – 22 October 2016), retired
  - Archbishop Faustin Ambassa Ndjodo, C.I.C.M. (since 22 October 2016)

=== Coadjutor archbishop ===
- Christian Wiyghan Tumi (1982-1984); future Cardinal

=== Auxiliary bishop ===
- Jean-Marie-Joseph-Augustin Pasquier, O.M.I. (1969-1982), appointed Bishop of Ngaoundéré

== Suffragan Dioceses ==
- Maroua–Mokolo
- Ngaoundéré
- Yagoua

== See also ==
- Roman Catholicism in Cameroon

== Sources ==
- catholic-hierarchy
- GCatholic.org
