= Albert Ndongmo =

Cameroonian bishop

- Albert Ndongmo with the Pope some years after his release from imprisonment
- Diocese: Roman Catholic Diocese of Nkongsamba
- Appointed: 16 June 1964
- Term ended: 29 January 1973
- Predecessor: Paul Bouque
- Successor: Thomas Nkuissi

Orders
- Ordination: 21 December 1955

Personal details
- Born: 26 September 1926 Bafou, Cameroon
- Died: 29 May 1992 (aged 65) Quebec
- Buried: Nkongsamba, Cameroon
- Denomination: Catholic
- Occupation: Priest

Albert Ndongmo (26 September 1926 – 29 May 1992) was Bishop of Nkongsamba in Cameroon between June 1964 and January 1973. In 1970 he was arrested, accused of treasonous dealings with rebels, and sentenced to death by a military tribunal. His sentence was later commuted to life imprisonment, of which he served five years before the President ordered his release. After being released he moved to Rome and then to Canada, where he spent the rest of his life.

== Early career ==
Albert Ndongmo was born on 26 September 1926 in Bafou, French Cameroons, near Dschang, to a Christian family of Bamiléké people. On 19 September 1940 he entered the small seminary at Melong, against the wishes of his parents. In January 1947 he was admitted to the large seminary at Mvolyé. A year later Castor Osendé Afana came to the Mvolyé seminary, and the two became close friends. Ndongmo was ordained on 21 December 1955 at Nkongsamba. He was appointed chaplain of the Nkongsamba diocese in 1959.

On 15 March 1960, Ndongmo launched the journal L'Essor des jeunes to impart Christian values to young people. With this journal, Ndongmo wanted to provide a forum for open debate of contemporary problems. He saw freedom of expression as the cornerstone of an integrated system of political, social, personal and intellectual belief, and attempted to use the journal for this purpose, although he was forced to work within a very limited budget. The journal was stamped with Ndongmo's personality. He used it, and his "ecclesiastical immunity" to ignore the censors and criticize the regime.

In April 1970 the archbishop Jean Zoa wanted to move L'Essor to Yaoundé and to make it a monthly Catholic journal for young people throughout the country. Although he agreed in principle with the need for a national journal, Ndongmo resisted the move and the change was not implemented. The regime viewed L'Essor des Jeunes as a subversive publication, particularly when it occasionally printed Ndongmo's pastoral letters, or extracts from his sermons, and suppressed it after arresting Ndongmo in 1970.

After Cameroon gained independence in 1960, Union of the Peoples of Cameroon (UPC) rebels who had been fighting the French colonial government continued to fight the government of President Ahmadou Ahidjo, whom they considered to be a puppet of the French. Ahidjo had asked the French to lend troops to keep the peace during and after the transition to democracy. Led by General Max Briand, who had served previously in Algeria and Indochina, these troops conducted a brutal "cleansing" campaign in the Bamiléké territory of the West, Centre and Littoral provinces. By some reports, over a quarter of a million people died. The rebel leader Ernest Ouandié, a Bamiléké like Ndongmo, refused to recognise Ahidjo and continued guerilla warfare. The diocese of Nkongsamba was in the main combat zone.

== Bishop of Nkongsamba ==
Ndongmo was named Bishop of Nkongsamba on 16 June 1964, was consecrated bishop on 16 August that year and was enthroned the same day by Archbishop Jean Zoa. He succeeded Paul Bouque in this position. He was the first local bishop of Nkongsamba, which at that time included the whole Bamiléké area.

In the later part of 1965 he attended the third and fourth sessions of the fourth period of the Second Vatican Council in Rome. He made an oral intervention on "the ministry and sacerdotal life of priests" on 16 October 1965. The intervention was incomplete, since his was the sixteenth and last of the session and he did not have time to conclude it. Cardinal Lercaro, moderating the session, politely invited him to submit his observations to the Secretariat in writing. He submitted a written intervention on "Christological, ecclesiological and anthropological foundations of the missionary activity of the Church".

Ndongmo was thought to have personal political ambitions, perhaps even aspiring to the presidency. He understood and to some extent agreed with the UPC since he too was opposed to the dictatorial regime, although he did not support the revolutionary guerrilla movement. He sympathized with the Bamiléké insurgents but accepted that the region need peace in order to develop economically. It was reported that he visited Algers from May to June 1968 to ask for funds for the UPC from the Algerian government. Such a trip could not have been reconciled with his pastoral duties. He may have served as a postbox, passing communications between the local and exiled branches of the UPC. His statements on political subjects earned him the hostility of others in the church as well as of the government.

According to Ndongmo, in 1965 President Ahidjo asked him to try to mediate with Ernest Ouandié, now the last active rebel leader, to try to end the fighting. In the following years Ndongmo had a series of meetings with the rebels. In July or August 1970 Ouandié called for help, and Ndongmo picked him up in his car and took him to his own house, where he let him stay for several nights. Ndongmo claimed that his actions were consistent with President Ahidjo's instructions. Possibly, Ndongmo was being used as bait to capture Ouandié.

== Charges and imprisonment ==
On 11 August 1970 Ndongmo wrote to Le Monde to contradict a false accusation that a stock of arms had been found at the "Mungo Plastique" company, of which he was the manager, and to state that two European technical advisors at that company had been expelled only because their papers were not in order. The prime minister of East Cameroon, Simon Pierre Tchoungui, asked the Pope to summon Ndongmo to Rome and to then invite him to remain there. Ahidjo and Archbishop Jean Zoa were apparently behind the request, wanting to get Ndongmo out of the way. In Rome, Ndongmo was questioned about his ownership of the plastics factory in Douala. Ndongmo explained he had set up the factory only to give the diocese financial independence, so it did not have to rely on Western aid. The Holy See was against this and other enterprises with which Ndongmo had hoped to fund the diocese, schools and hospitals and to create a retirement fund for priests and old people. He was reprimanded by the Vatican for his economic and political activity.

Before leaving for Rome, Ndongmo sent Ouandié to take refuge with his catechist on the outskirts of Mbanga. The catechist refused to accept Ouandié, and alerted the police. Ouandié went on the run, but was in unfamiliar territory and was hunted by the local people as well as the police. Eventually, tired, thirsty and hungry, he gave himself up. Two days after Ouandié's arrest, on 21 August 1970 the Minister of Justice, Félix Sabal Lecco, announced that the security services had discovered a plot to assassinate the head of state by Ouandie in which Ndongmo was complicit. It was clear that the authorities planned to convict Ndongmo in his absence. He managed to convince the Vatican officials to let him return to defend himself. On Ndongmo's return to Cameroon on 27 August 1970, he found from a newspaper headline that he had been suspended from his position by Rome. Pope Paul VI had named Georges Siyam Siewe as apostolic administrator "Sede Plena" for Nkongsamba, taking over all active duties. although Ndongmo remained bishop. Ndongmo went at once to visit the Bishop of Douala. A car was sent to arrest him there and take him to the military prison in Yaoundé.

Ndongmo was placed in a cell of his own, separated from the other prisoners. His legs and arms were chained, although the handcuffs were removed after a protest by his lawyer. He and Ouandié were otherwise not mistreated, were given normal food, and often had a glass of wine with their meal. A doctor checked their condition frequently. He and the other accused were interrogated by Jean Fochivé, director of the regime's SEDOC political police force, over the next five months. Ouandié was tried in December 1970 and condemned to death. Ndongmo was tried by a military tribunal that opened on 5 January 1971. He and two others were found guilty and sentenced to death, but on 14 January 1971 his sentence was commuted to life imprisonment. Ouandié was executed by firing squad on 15 January 1971 at Bafoussam. Ndongmo was sent to a prison camp in Tcholliré. He resigned from his position as Bishop on 29 January 1973. The Pope named Thomas Nkuissi to succeed Ndongmo as acting bishop of Nkongsamba.

The church and the state had established an uneasy truce that was severely damaged by the "Ndongmo affair". Ndongmo's arrest, trial and imprisonment engendered ongoing hostility from the church towards the Cameroon state and created intense controversy within the church. Some Catholics condemned Archbishop Zoa for being too close to the government, and for possibly assisting in removal of a popular rival. The affair also caused tension between Muslims and Christians: several churches were burned in the North.

== Later career ==
President Ahidjo ordered Ndongmo's release in 1975 shortly before a presidential "election". (Note: In 1975 Ahidjo was reelected with 99% of the votes. It was generally thought that the election was unfair.) Under an agreement between Ahidjo and the Vatican, Ndongmo had to leave Cameroon for Rome. Later he moved to Canada, where he was given citizenship and lived out the rest of his life. An acquaintance met him at Université Laval in Halifax, Nova Scotia. He was in good spirits, working on his prison writings and planning to take a course at the university. He described how he had passed the time while imprisoned by gardening and "writing without paper." Ahidjo resigned the Presidency in November 1982 and in February 1984 a Cameroon military tribunal sentenced him to death in absentia. Ndongmo visited Cameroon twice after this, once when Pope John Paul II visited the country in August 1985, and again in 1989 when he was invited to work on the episcopal council of Central African bishops at Yaounde.

Albert Ndongmo died on 29 May 1992 in Quebec. His body was returned to Cameroon and was buried in the run-down cathedral at Nkongsamba in an elaborate ceremony.
