= Diocese of Nkongsamba =

Roman Catholic diocese in Cameroon

Coordinates: 4.9541°N 9.9305°E

Diocese of Nkongsamba Dioecesis Nkongsambensis Diocèse de Nkongsamba
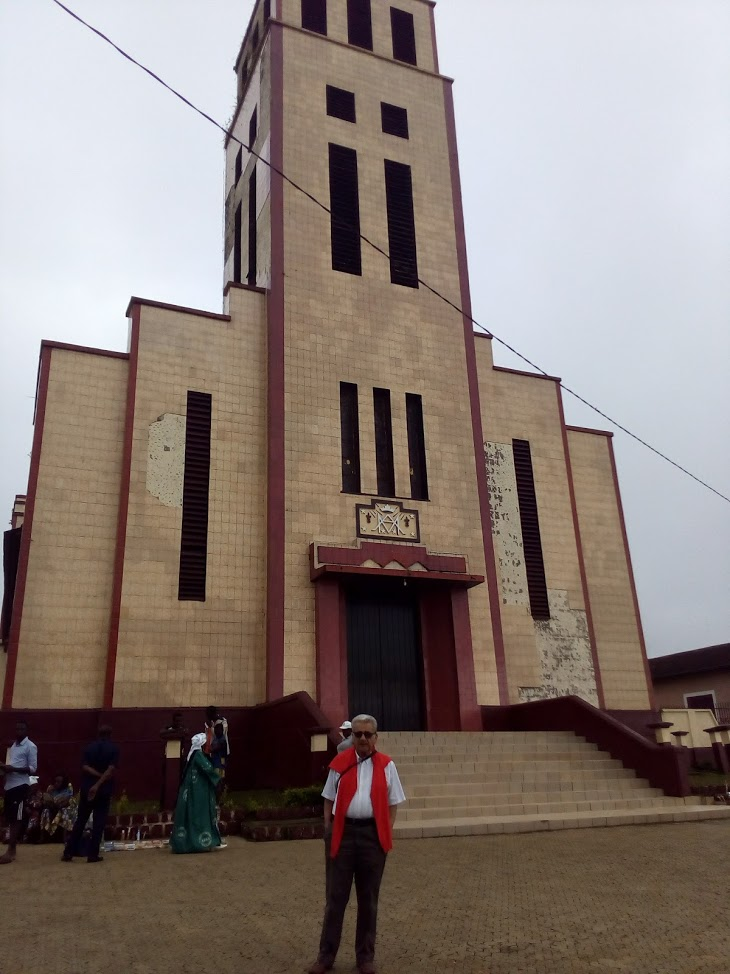
- Cathédrale de l’Immaculée Conception in Nkongsamba

Location
- Country: Cameroon
- Metropolitan: Archdiocese of Douala
- Headquarters: Nkongsamba, Littoral Region, Cameroon

Statistics
- Area: 4,057 km^{2} (1,566 sq mi)
- Population: Total; Catholics: (as of 2023); 803,000; 178,000 (22.2%)
- Parishes: 67

Information
- Denomination: Catholic Church
- Sui iuris church: Latin Church
- Rite: Roman Rite
- Established: 28 April 1914; 112 years ago
- Cathedral: Cathédrale de l’Immaculée Conception in Nkongsamba
- Patron saint: Immaculate Conception
- Secular priests: 81 (65 Diocesan, 16 Religious Orders)

Current leadership
- Pope: Leo XIV
- Bishop: Dieudonné Espoir Atangana
- Metropolitan Archbishop: Samuel Kleda

The Roman Catholic Diocese of Nkongsamba (Latin: Nkongsamben(sis)) is a Latin suffragan diocese in the ecclesiastical province of Douala in Cameroon.

Its cathedral episcopal see is the Cathédrale de l’Immaculée Conception, dedicated to the Immaculate Conception at Nkongsamba, in Moungo Department in the Littoral Region (Cameroon).

== Statistics ==
As of 2023, it pastorally served 178,000 Catholics (22.2% of 803,000 total) on 4,057 km^{2} (1,566 sq mi) in 67 parishes with 81 priests (65 diocesan, 16 religious), and 84 lay religious (29 brothers, 55 sisters).

== History ==
Established on 28 April 1914, as Apostolic Prefecture of Adamaua, an immense territory on the Adamawa Pateau, split off from the much vaster still Apostolic Vicariate of Khartoum (in the then Anglo-Egyptian Sudan), the Apostolic Vicariate of Cameroun and the Apostolic Prefecture of Ouibangui Shari.

Renamed on 11 June 1923, as Apostolic Prefecture of Foumban, after its see F(o)umban. With this change also came a loss of British-administered territory to form part of the newly-established Apostolic Prefecture of Buéa.

It gained territory on 3 February 1932 from the Apostolic Vicariate of Khartoum.

Promoted on 28 May 1934, as Apostolic Vicariate of Foumban, hence entitled to a (titular) bishop.

It lost territory repeatedly:

- 11 July 1939, ceded territory to the Apostolic Vicariate of Yaoundé
- 28 May 1940, to establish the Apostolic Prefecture of Berbérati (now a bishopric in Central African Republic)
- 28 April 1942, to establish the then Apostolic Prefecture of Niamey (in Niger)
- 9 January 1947, to establish the Apostolic Prefecture of Garoua and Apostolic Prefecture of Fort-Lamy (Chad), as well as ceding more territory to the Apostolic Prefecture of Berbérati

On 14 September 1955, it was promoted and renamed as Diocese of Nkongsamba after its present see.

In the ensuing decades, more territory was gradually lost:

- 5 February 1970, to establish the Diocese of Bafoussam
- 12 March 1993, ceded territory to the Archdiocese of Douala
- 22 March 1993, to establish the Diocese of Edéa
- 26 May 2012, to establish the Diocese of Bafang

== Leadership ==
=== Apostolic Prefects of Adamaua ===
- Gerhard Lennartz, S.C.I. (29 April 1914 – 30 December 1919), resigned
- Joseph Plissonneau, S.C.I. (7 February 1920 – 11 June 1923 see below)

=== Apostolic Prefects of Foumban ===
- Joseph Plissonneau, S.C.I. (see above 11 June 1923 – 1930), resigned
- Paul Bouque, S.C.I. (28 October 1930 – 28 May 1934 see below)

=== Apostolic Vicar of Foumban ===
- Paul Bouque, S.C.I. (see above 28 May 1934 – 14 September 1955 see below)

=== Suffragan Bishops of Nkongsamba ===
- Paul Bouque, S.C.I. (see above 14 September 1955 – 16 June 1964), resigned
- Albert Ndongmo (16 June 1964 – 29 January 1973), resigned
  - Apostolic Administrator Thomas Nkuissi (29 January 1973 – 15 November 1978), Priest of Nkongsamba
- Thomas Nkuissi (15 November 1978 – 21 November 1992), resigned
  - Apostolic Administrator André Wouking (21 November 1992 – 10 June 1995), Bishop of Bafoussam
- Dieudonné Watio (1 April 1995 – 5 March 2011), appointed Bishop of Bafoussam
- Dieudonné Espoir Atangana (26 May 2012 – present)

=== Another priest of this diocese who became bishop ===
- Abraham Kome (1999–2012), appointed Bishop of Bafang in 2012

== See also ==
- Roman Catholicism in Cameroon
