= Bonaléa =

Coordinates: 4.2°N 9.44°E

- Commune and town
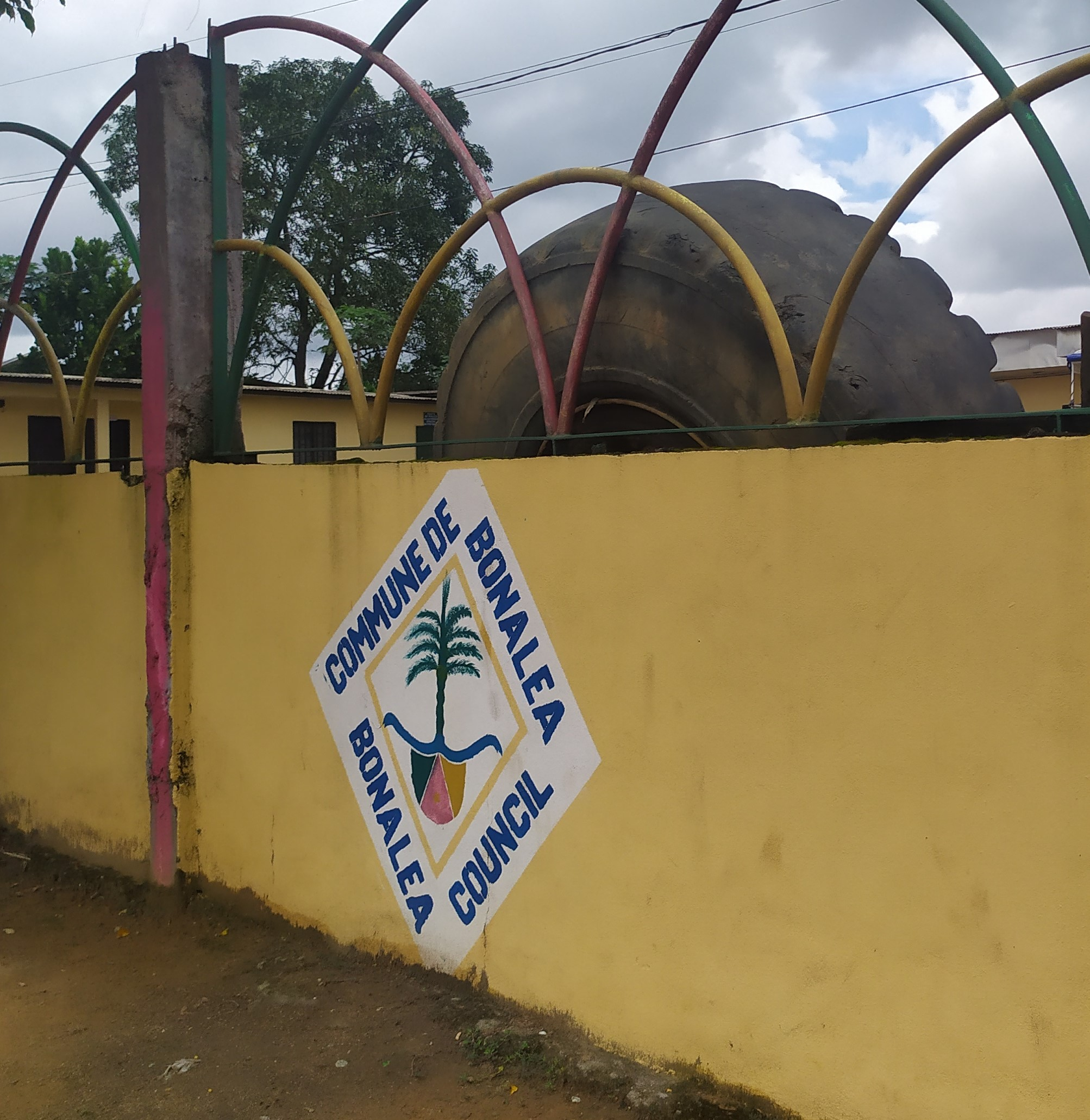
- Logo of Bonalea Council on a wall of the council
- Interactive map of Bonaléa
- Country: Cameroon
- Time zone: UTC+1 (WAT)

Bonaléa is a town and commune in Cameroon.

It is pronounced Bunaléa in Bankon language. Bonaléa literally means "family of Léa" 1, is a commune of Cameroon located in the Littoral region in the department of Moungo, in the district of Fiko, north of the city of Douala, in Nkon country. Its territorial jurisdiction is that of the BanKon (or Abo) communities 2,3 and has around 75,000 inhabitants.

== Geography ==
Its physical space includes 57 villages and covers an area of 650 km2.

It is limited to the North by the district of Mbanga, to the North-East by a large forest and wildlife reserve that separates the Dibombe river from Mpobo and Mamba, to the South and East by the district of Dibombari, West (and North) by the Mungo River. It is bordered by three municipalities in the Moungo department.

== See also ==
- Communes of Cameroon
