= Paul Bouque =

French bishop

- Diocese: Roman Catholic Diocese of Nkongsamba
- Installed: 14 September 1955
- Term ended: 16 June 1964
- Predecessor: Joseph Donatien Plissonneau
- Successor: Albert Ndongmo

Orders
- Ordination: 26 July 1925

Personal details
- Born: 6 July 1896 Hauconcourt, France
- Died: 15 August 1979 (aged 83)
- Denomination: Catholic
- Occupation: Priest

Paul Bouque (6 July 1896 – 15 August 1979) was Bishop of Nkongsamba, Cameroon, from September 1955 until 16 June 1964, when he resigned.

== Life ==
Paul Bouque was born in Hauconcourt, France on 6 July 1896. He was ordained a priest of Congregation of the Priests of the Sacred Heart on 26 July 1925. On 28 October 1930, he was appointed Prefect of Foumban, Cameroon. On 28 May 1934, he was appointed Titular Bishop of Vagada and Vicar Apostolic of Foumban, Cameroon. He was ordained as Bishop on 21 November 1934 in Metz, France. He was interested in evangelizing in the west and central parts of his vicariate, and in 1935 fixed his seat at Nkongsamba, which in effect became his permanent residence.

In 1936, Paul Bouque transferred the junior seminary to Melong, to the north of Nkongsamba. The first candidates from this seminary were accepted by the senior seminary at Mvolyé in 1940. Albert Ndongmo was admitted to the seminary at Melong in September 1940. He was to go on to succeed Bouque as Bishop of Nkongsamba.

Paul Bouque became Bishop of Nkongsamba, Cameroon on 14 September 1955, when Foumban was promoted to become the Diocese of Nkongsamba. He held this office until he resigned on 16 June 1964. He was titular Bishop of Abbir Germaniciana from then until he resigned from that position on 11 Aug 1976. He died on 15 Aug 1979.

== See also ==
- Catholic Church in Cameroon
