= Dieudonné Espoir Atangana =

Cameroonian Catholic prelate (born 1958)

The Most Reverend Dieudonné Espoir Atangana
- Bishop of Nkongsamba, Cameroon
- Church: Catholic Church
- Archdiocese: Catholic Archdiocese of Douala
- See: Diocese of Nkongsamba
- Appointed: 26 May 2012
- Installed: 14 July 2012
- Predecessor: Dieudonné Watio (1 April 1995 - 5 March 2011)
- Successor: Incumbent

Orders
- Ordination: 21 June 1986 by Jean Zoa
- Consecration: 14 July 2012 by Piero Pioppo
- Rank: Bishop

Personal details
- Born: Dieudonné Espoir Atangana; 20 March 1958 (age 68) Efok, Archdiocese of Yaoundé, Centre Region, Cameroon

Styles of Dieudonné Espoir Atangana
- Reference style: Your Lordship; The Most Reverend
- Spoken style: His Lordship
- Religious style: Bishop

Dieudonné Espoir Atangana (born 20 March 1958) is a Cameroonian Catholic prelate who serves as bishop of the Roman Catholic Diocese of Nkongsamba, in Cameroon since 26 May 2012. Before that, from 21 June 1986 until 26 May 2012, he was a priest of the Diocese of Obala. He was appointed by Pope Benedict XIV. He was consecrated by Piero Pioppo, Titular Archbishop of Torcello, on 14 July 2012, at Nkongsamba.

== Background and education ==
He was born on 20 March 1958 in Efok, Centre Region in Cameroon. At the time of his birth that location was in the Diocese of Yaoundé, but as of the time of writing, it is in the Diocese of Obala. He is the eldest of six children; five boys and one girl. He attended elementary school in Catholic schools in his home area. He studied at the Saint Joseph Minor Seminary in Akono from 1971 until 1975. He graduated with the Brevet d'Études du Premier Cycle (BEPC) (English: Junior High School Diploma). From 1975 until 1979, he studied for the equivalent of a High School Diploma at the Saint Thérèse Minor Seminary in Mvolye, then continued with studies at the François-Xavier-Vogt College in Yaounde. He studied philosophy and theology at the Immaculate Conception Major Seminary of Nkolbisson from 1979 until 1986. Later, he graduated from the Pontifical Urban University in Rome, Italy with a Doctorate in Dogmatic Theology.

== Priesthood ==
On 22 June 1985, Adalbert Ndzana, Coadjutor Bishop of Mbalmayo ordained him a deacon at Mokolo, Diocese of Maroua-Mokolo. He was ordained a priest for the Archdiocese of Yaoundé, on 21 June 1986 by Jean Zoa, Archbishop of Yaoundé. When the Diocese of Obala was erected on 3 July 1987, Father Dieudonné Espoir Atangana was incardinated in the new diocese. He served as a priest until 26 May 2012. While a priest, he served in various roles and locations, including:

- Parish Vicar from 1986 until 1987.
- Studies in Rome for a Doctorate in Dogmatic Theology at the Pontifical Urban University from 1987 until 1993.
- Professor and teacher at the Interdiocesan Major Seminary Notre Dame de l'Immaculée Conception in Yaoundé from 1993 until 2001.
- Vice Rector at the Interdiocesan Major Seminary Notre Dame de l'Immaculée Conception of Yaoundé from 2001 until 2002.
- Rector of the Inter-diocesan Major Seminary Notre Dame de l'Immaculée Conception of Yaoundé from 2002 unti 2008.
- Rector of the Seminary of Notre Dame de l'Espérance in Bertoua from 2008 until 2011.
- Sabbatical year from 2011 until 2012.

== Bishop ==
On 26 May 2012, Pope Benedict XVI appointed Reverend Dieudonné Espoir Atangana, previously a member of the clergy of Obala Catholic Diocese as Bishop of the Diocese of Nkongsamba. He was consecrated at Nkongsamba, on 14 July 2012, by Piero Pioppo, Titular Archbishop of Torcello assisted by Cornelius Fontem Esua, Archbishop of Bamenda and Roger Pirenne, Archbishop Emeritus of Bertoua. He continues to minister to the faithful as the local ordinary for that Catholic See.

== See also ==
- Catholic Church in Cameroon

== Succession table ==
Catholic Church titles
| Preceded by Dieudonné Watio (1 April 1995 - 5 March 2011) | Bishop of Nkongsamba (since 26 May 2012) | Succeeded by Incumbent |
