= Thomas Nkuissi =

- Bishop of Nkongsamba
- Church: Catholic Church
- Diocese: Diocese of Nkongsamba
- In office: 15 November 1978 – 21 November 1992
- Predecessor: Albert Ndongmo
- Successor: Dieudonné Watio
- Previous posts: Titular Bishop of Luperciana (1973-1978); Apostolic Administrator of Nkongsamba (1973-1978)

Orders
- Ordination: 29 June 1958
- Consecration: 15 April 1973 by Agnelo Rossi

Personal details
- Born: 7 July 1928 Nkongsamba, Mandatory Territory of Cameroun, French Empire
- Died: 16 March 2011 (aged 82)

Thomas Nkuissi (7 July 1928 – 16 March 2011) was the Roman Catholic bishop of the Roman Catholic Diocese of Nkongsamba, Cameroon, Africa.

Thomas Nkuissi was born on 7 July 1928 in Nkongsamba. Ordained to the priesthood in 1958, Nkuissi became bishop of the Nkongsamba diocese in 1978 after serving as auxiliary bishop. He succeeded Bishop Albert Ndongmo in this position. Ndongmo had resigned in 1973. He resigned in 1992.
