= Dieudonné Watio =

Cameroonian Catholic prelate (born 1946)

The Most Reverend Dieudonné Watio
- Bishop Emeritus of Bafoussam,Cameroon
- Church: Catholic Church
- Archdiocese: Roman Catholic Archdiocese of Douala
- See: Diocese of Bafoussam
- Appointed: 5 March 2011
- Installed: 14 May 2011
- Term ended: 19 March 2021
- Predecessor: Joseph Atanga (22 June 1999 - 3 December 2009)
- Successor: Paul Lontsié-Keuné (since 27 November 2021)

Orders
- Ordination: 5 July 1975
- Consecration: 10 June 1995 by Santos Abril y Castelló
- Rank: Bishop

Personal details
- Born: Dieudonné Watio; 18 March 1946 (age 80) Mbouda, West Region, Cameroon

Styles of Dieudonné Watio
- Reference style: Your Lordship; The Most Reverend
- Spoken style: His Lordship
- Religious style: Bishop

Dieudonné Watio (born 18 March 1946) is a Cameroonian Catholic prelate who served as the bishop of the Roman Catholic Diocese of Bafoussam, in Cameroon from 5 March 2011 until his age-related retirement on 19 March 2021. Before that, from 1 April 1995 until 5 March 2011, he served as the bishop of the Roman Catholic Diocese of Nkongsamba, Cameroon. He was appointed bishop by Pope John Paul II He was consecrated on 10 June 1995 by Santos Abril y Castelló, Titular Archbishop of Tamada. On 5 March 2011, Pope Benedict XVI transferred him to the Diocese of Bafoussam and appointed him local ordinary there. He was installed at Bafoussam on 14 May 2011. On 19 March 2021, Pope Francis accepted his age-related retirement from the pastoral care of the Diocese of Bafoussam. He lives on as Bishop Emeritus of Bafoussam.

== Background and education ==
Dieudonné Watio was born on 18 March 1946 at Mbouda, West Region, Cameroon. He studied philosophy and theology at seminary before he was ordained a priest.

== Priest ==
He was ordained a priest on 5 July 1975. He served as a priest until 1 April 1995. While a priest, he served in various roles and locations, including:

- Parish vicar and then parish priest of Bafou Parish from 1975 until 1982.
- Parish priest of Doumelong Parish and director of Saint Thomas Aquinas College in Bafoussam from 1986 until 1987.
- Rector of the minor seminary and principal of Saint Thomas College from 1987 until 1995.

== Bishop ==
On 1 April 1995, Pope John Paul II appointed him bishop of the Diocese of Nkongsamba, Cameroon. He was consecrated bishop on 10 June 1995 at the diocesan Cathedral in Nkongsamba, by Santos Abril y Castelló, Titular Archbishop of Tamada assisted by Paul Mbiybe Verdzekov, Archbishop of Bamenda and André Wouking, Bishop of Bafoussam.

On 5 March 2011, Pope Benedict XVI appointed him bishop of the Diocese of Bafoussam, Cameroon. He was installed at Bafoussam on 14 May 2011. On 19 March 2021, having attained the mandatory retirement age for Catholic bishops, retired from the pastoral care of the Catholic Diocese of Bafoussam. Pope Francis approved his retirement request effective that day.

== See also ==
- Catholic Church in Cameroon

== Succession table ==
Catholic Church titles
Preceded by Joseph Atanga (22 June 1999 - 3 December 2009)	Bishop of Bafoussam (5 Mar 2011 - 19 March 2021)	Succeeded by Paul Lontsié-Keuné (27 November 2021)
Preceded by Thomas Nkuissi (15 November1978 - 21 November 1992)	Bishop of Nkongsamba (1 April 1995 - 5 March 2011)	Succeeded by Dieudonné Espoir Atangana (since 26 May 2012)
