= Meanja =

Coordinates: 4°16′23″N 9°23′32″E

Meanja is situated in Moungo, Littoral, Cameroon. Its geographical coordinates are 4° 16' 23" North, 9° 23' 32" East and its original name (with diacritics) is Meanja.
