= Pierre Narcisse =

Cameroonian-born Russian singer (1977–2022)

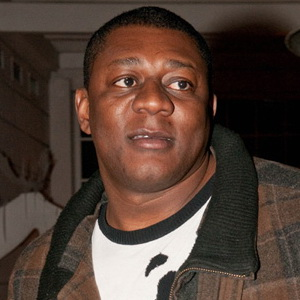
- Narcisse in 2010
- Born: Mudio Mukutu Pierre Narcisse De Napoli De Suza; 19 February 1977; Ebone, Cameroon
- Died: 21 June 2022 (aged 45); Moscow, Russia
- Education: MSU Faculty of Journalism
- Occupation: Singer
- Children: 1

Mudio Mukutu Pierre Narcisse De Napoli De Suza, better known as Pierre Narcisse (Russian: Пьер Нарцисс; 19 February 1977 – 21 June 2022), was a Cameroonian-born Russian singer.

== Biography ==
Born in Ebone, Cameroon in 1977, Narcisse played football as a child and learned to play saxophone at age 13. In the early 1990s, he created a group which performed music at nightclubs, both in the French language and local Cameroonian languages.

Narcisse moved to Yegoryevsk, where his sister lived and took part in the filming of The Barber of Siberia. He then attended the MSU Faculty of Journalism and played for the KVN team of the Peoples' Friendship University of Russia. In 2000, he participated in several episodes of the television show 12 Angry Viewers on MTV Russia as a participant. In 2001, he appeared on a special edition of the show, replacing Yana Churikova. At the same time, he worked for the radio station Hit FM.

Narcisse recorded the song Chocolate Hare for the television series Fabrika Zvyozd. In 2004, he released an album of the same name as his song. In 2006, he was awarded the title Honored Artist of Ingushetia. In 2008, he participated in the Russia-1 show Dancing on Ice. In 2013, he recorded the singles The Domes and Sakhalin's Love alongside Mikhail Grebenshchikov.

== Death ==
Pierre Narcisse died in Moscow on 21 June 2022 following kidney surgery. His death was reported by his ex-wife Valeria Kalacheva and daughter Karolina-Kristel.
