= Léonard-Claude Mpouma =

Cameroonian politician (1938–2019)

Minister of Industrial and Commercial Development of Cameroon
- In office 12 June 1970 – 3 July 1972

Minister of Posts & Telecommunications of Cameroon
- In office 24 August 1985 – 16 May 1988

Personal details
- Born: 6 November 1938 Mbanga, Cameroon
- Died: 16 June 2019 (aged 81) Yaoundé, Cameroon

Léonard-Claude Mpouma was a Cameroonian political figure. Beginning in the 1960s, he held a succession of high-level posts in the state administration; he was Minister of Industrial and Commercial Development from 1970 to 1972 and was later appointed as Minister of Posts and Telecommunications in 1985. Mpouma also acted as the president of the Union of Palm Oil Producers, or UNEXPALM, from 2000 until his death in 2019.

== Background and political career ==
Born in Mbanga, Cameroon, Mpouma studied in France at the Institut national agronomique (Later Institut national agronomique Paris Grignon) from 1960 to 1963, receiving degrees in agronomic engineering and rural economy. He returned to Cameroon in October 1963 and was promptly sent to Garoua as Head of Agricultural Inspection for the North. After about four years in that post, he was appointed as Deputy Secretary-General of the Ministry of Planning in 1967 and then as Deputy Secretary-General of the Presidency of the Republic on 14 June 1969.

After a brief stint as Deputy Secretary-General of the Presidency, Mpouma served as President–Director-General of the National Investment Corporation (SNI) for about six months before being appointed to the government as Minister of Industrial and Commercial Development on 12 June 1970. He remained in that post until 1972; later, he was Inspector-General of the Ministry of Agriculture from 1975 to 1980, Technical Adviser at the Presidency of the Republic from 1980 to 1981, and Special Adviser at the Presidency of the Republic from 1981 to 1984. Under President Paul Biya, he was again appointed to the government as Minister of Posts and Telecommunications on 24 August 1985.

== President of UNEXPALM ==
As President of the Union of Palm Oil Producers (Union des exploitants du palmier à huile du Cameroun, UNEXPALM), Mpouma discussed the problem of palm oil scarcity in an interview with Cameroon Tribune on 22 September 2003. He said that internal demand had exceeded supply for various reasons, including aging plantations, but that his union hoped to solve the shortage by focusing on small-scale production. Later, on 28 January 2004, the government launched a program to expand palm oil production by providing palm groves to small farmers in seven provinces; UNEXPALM was in charge of the program's implementation. Speaking to Cameroon Tribune again in November 2005, Mpouma addressed concerns that the price of palm oil would increase during the holidays, saying that would not occur.

Palm oil production in Cameroon for 2007 surpassed government expectations by 18%, rising to 200,000 metric tons. In hopes of further increasing production, Mpouma announced—in a joint statement with Jean Nkuete, the Deputy Prime Minister for Agriculture and Rural Development—the creation of an investment fund for the sector on 7 March 2008: "stakeholders in the oil-palm sector have resolved to create a fund to be financed by the state, development organizations and contributions from partners in the sector".

== See also ==
- Politics of Cameroon
