= Manjo =

- Commune and town
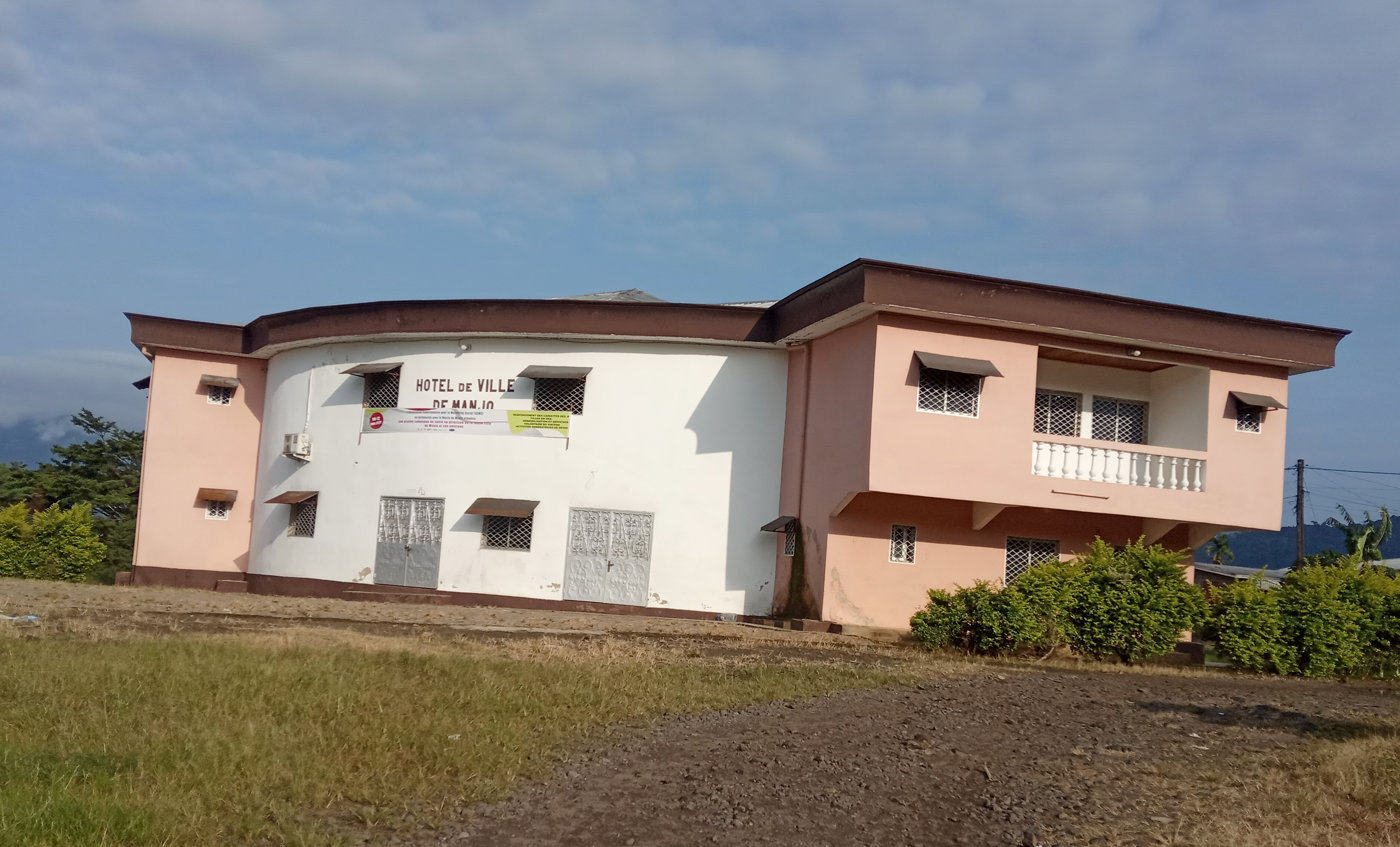
- Manjo City Council

- Location in Cameroon
- Coordinates: 4°51′N 9°49′E
- Country: Cameroon
- Region: Littoral
- Department: Moungo
- District: Upper Mungo
- Elevation: 647 m (2,123 ft)

Population (2012)
  - Total: 29,683
- Time zone: UTC+1 (WAT)

Manjo is a town and commune in Moungo, Littoral Region, Cameroon.

== See also ==
- Communes of Cameroon
