= Mombo, Cameroon =

Coordinates: 4.5667°N 9.6000°E

Mombo
- Commune and town
- Interactive map of Mombo
- Country: Cameroon
- Region: Littoral Region
- Department: Moungo
- Time zone: UTC+1 (WAT)

Mombo is a town and commune in Moungo, Littoral Region, Cameroon.

== See also ==
- Communes of Cameroon
