= Ebone, Cameroon =

Ebone
- Commune and town
- Location in Cameroon
- Coordinates: 4°53′N 9°54′E
- Country: Cameroon
- Region: Littoral
- Department: Moungo
- Time zone: UTC+1 (WAT)

Ebone is a town and commune in the Moungo department of Cameroon.

== See also ==
- Communes of Cameroon
