= Dibombari =

- Commune and town
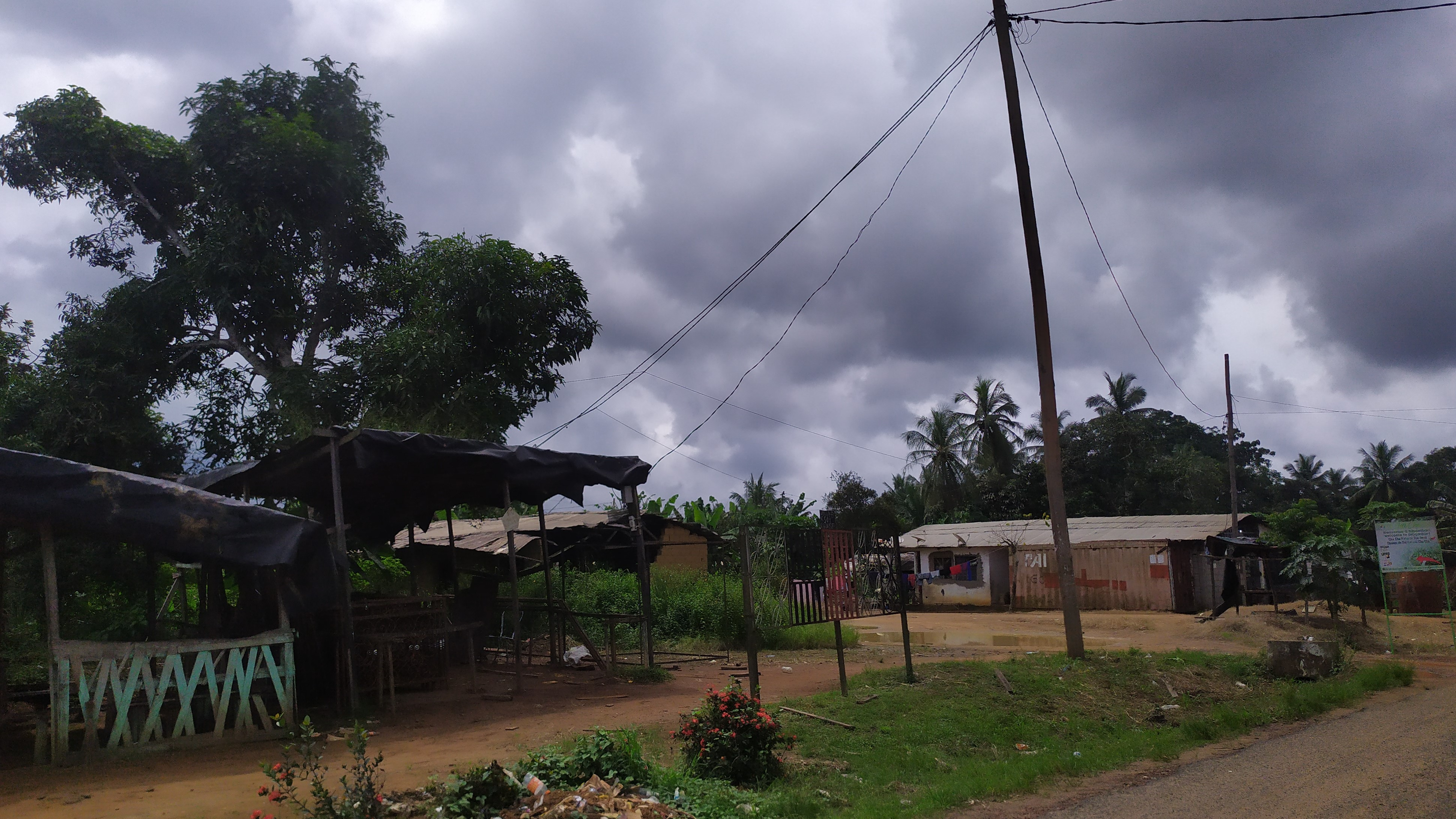
- Bomono in the Dimbombari commune

- Location in Cameroon
- Coordinates: 4°10′39″N 9°39′22″E
- Country: Cameroon
- Region: Littoral
- Department: Moungo
- Time zone: UTC+1 (WAT)

Dibombari is a town and commune located in Moungo, Littoral Region, Cameroon.

== See also ==
- Communes of Cameroon
