= Baré, Cameroon =

Coordinates: 5°00′N 9°58′E

Baré
- Commune and town
- Interactive map of Baré
- Country: Cameroon
- Time zone: UTC+1 (WAT)

Baré is a town and commune in Cameroon. It is a mildly populated village in Nkongsamba, market day is every Thursday. Baré-Bakem is a region of Moungo whose last king of ancestral royal lineage before the colonization was King Ekandjoum Joseph.

== See also ==
- Communes of Cameroon
