= Moungo (department) =

- Department
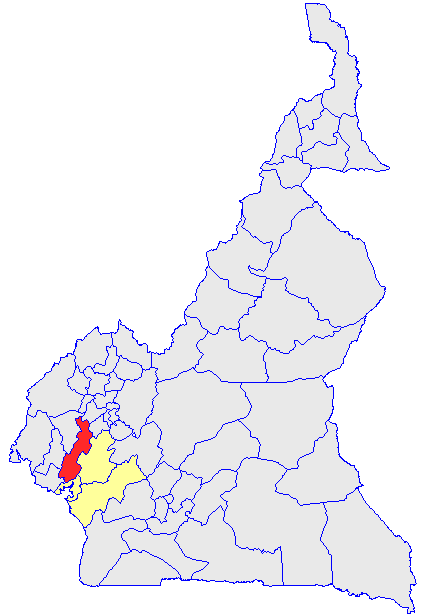
- Department location in Cameroon
- Country: Cameroon
- Province: Littoral Province
- Capital: Nkongsamba

Government
  - Governor: François Mebenga Ekani
  - Deputy Governor: Édouard Bedzigui Engoulou

Area
  - Total: 3,723 km^{2} (1,437 sq mi)

Population (2001)
  - Total: 452,722
  - Density: 121.6/km^{2} (314.9/sq mi)
- Time zone: UTC+01:00 (WAT)

Moungo is a department of Littoral Province in Cameroon. The department covers an area of 3,723 km^{2} and as of 2001 had a total population of 452,722. The capital of the department lies at Nkongsamba.

== Geography ==
The County covers an area of 3,723 km^{2}, representing 18.4% of the Littoral region's territory. Located in the western part of the region, it extends along the left bank of the Moungo River, which flows from north to south and originates at the foot of the Rumpi Mountains. The mountainous areas are located in the north of the department, with the highest points being Mount Manengouba (2,250 m ), Mount Nlonako (1,822 m ), and Mount Koupé (2,064 m ).

== History ==
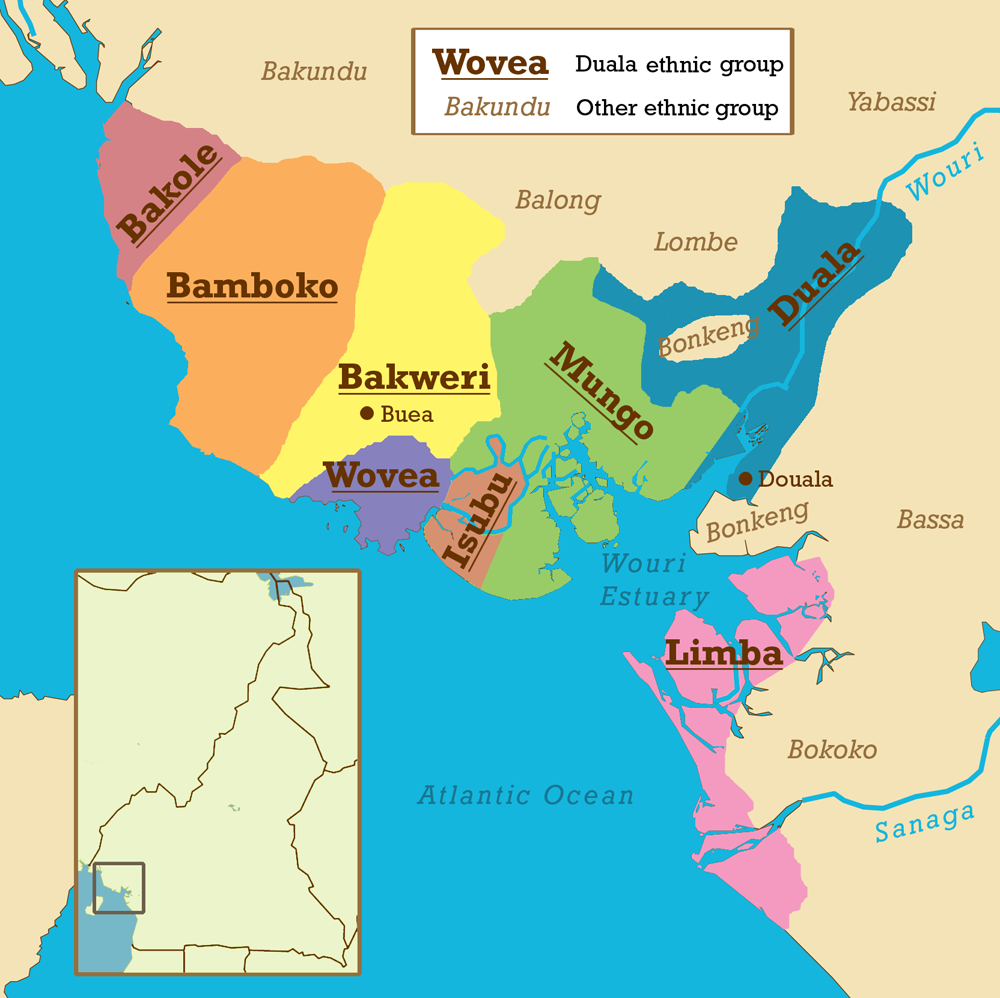
Map showing the location of the various Sawa Tribes of Cameroon

The Moungo Division was created in the 1960s. The Mungo Chiefdom emerged in the late 1700s as one of the powerful Sawa tribes of the litoral region; with their territory stretching along the lower and navigable parts of the Mungo River and straddling from Keka to Dibombari. In 1858, British Baptist Alfred Saker found the anti-slave and free settlement of Victoria, which later became the capital of the Ambas Bay colony. Though the land was bought from Chief Bile of the Sawa tribe of Isubu, this was met with rejection from the other Sawa Tribes, mainly the Bakweri, Mungo and Duala as a betrayal to their culture. However, due to trade and diplomacy between Alfred Saker and the natives, the settlement of Victoria and later British rule was preferable as compared to the Germans who were pushing into the Duala territory. King Manga Bell of the Duala and King Joseph Ekandjoum of the Mungo were both friends and relatives, who were opposed to German colonization.

The Sawa tribes were changed fundamentally by the European trade. European goods became status symbols, and some rulers appointed Western traders and missionaries as advisors.Competition escalated between coastal groups and even between related settlements. German arrival on the mainland meant that the coastal peoples' monopoly on trade had ended. Years of contact with Westerners and a high level of literacy had allowed a literate upper class of Isubu and Mungo clerks, farmers, and traders to emerge in Victoria and Buea. This class was familiar with European law and conventions, which allowed them to pressure the German colonial government with petitions, legal proceedings, and special interest groups to oppose unpopular or unfair policies.

In 1884, the Ambas Bay Colony became part of German Kamerun and thus the beginning of German expansion into the hinterlands of the continent. The German government offered King Ekandjoum military training, and for him and his children to travelto Germany, however, this was met with a refusal from the King. He did not trust the colonial administration, which had already executed his relative and best friend, Douala Manga Bell . On the other hand, another Chief, sympathetic to the German colonial power, agreed to send his sons to Germany, and later conspired with the colonial administration in Germany to divide King Joseph Ekandjoum's territory. Despite the ost of his territory and Chiefdom, Joseph Ekandjoum remains recognized as the last king of the Moungo Chiefdom before the German colonial project and the founding of Cameroon.

Following World War I, the German territory of Kamerun was divided between the United Kingdom and France as part of the League of Nations mandate. The result was the division of the Mungo Chiefdom and it people into the Mungo District of Southern Cameroon and the District of Dibambari in French Cameroon.

During the 1950s, French settlers, anxious to preserve their agricultural concessions, attempted to divide the Cameroonian nationalist movement by stirring up xenophobic sentiments towards the Bamileke. However, the Mungo People, remained hospitable. The majority of the UPC 's militant base in the region consisted of banana planters and farmers displaced from their lands to make way for large European concessions.

== Subdivisions ==
The department is divided administratively into 12 communes and in turn into villages.

District	Capital	Area (km^{2})
Nkongsamba	Nkongsamba	179.45
Penja	Penja	260
Mbanga	Mbanga	544
Dibombari	Dibambari	150
Manjo	Manjo	305
Melong	Melong	497
Loum	Loum	430
Baré-Bakem	Baré	200
Nlonako	Ebone	140
Abo Fiko	Bonaléa	650
Mombo	Mombo	250
