= Mvolyé =

- Location in Cameroon
- Coordinates: 3°50′N 11°30′E
- Country: Cameroon
- Region: Centre

Mvolyé or Mvolye is a neighbourhood of Yaoundé, Cameroon. Around 1900, during Cameroon's colonial period, the site was part of the lands ruled by Karl Atangana. Atangana donated part of the area to the German Pallottine Fathers, a Roman Catholic missionary group. The Ewondo people had previously been unable to settle it due to a large rock there. The Fathers built a permanent mission, which opened Central and Eastern Cameroon to Christianisation. Atangana remained chief of the area.

== Local culture and heritage ==
=== Places and monuments ===
==== Basilica Mary Queen of the Apostles of Mvolyé ====
The basilica is located at the southern exit of Yaoundé on the hill of Mvolyé.

Basilica's views

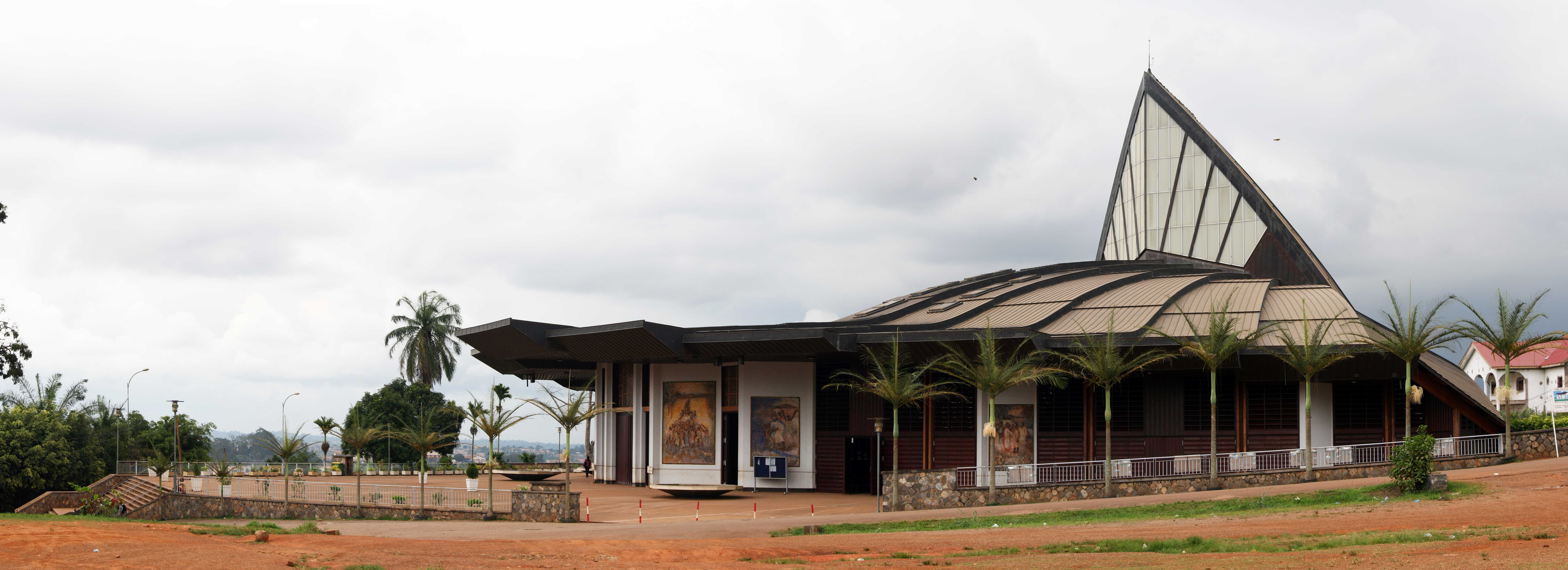
Front view

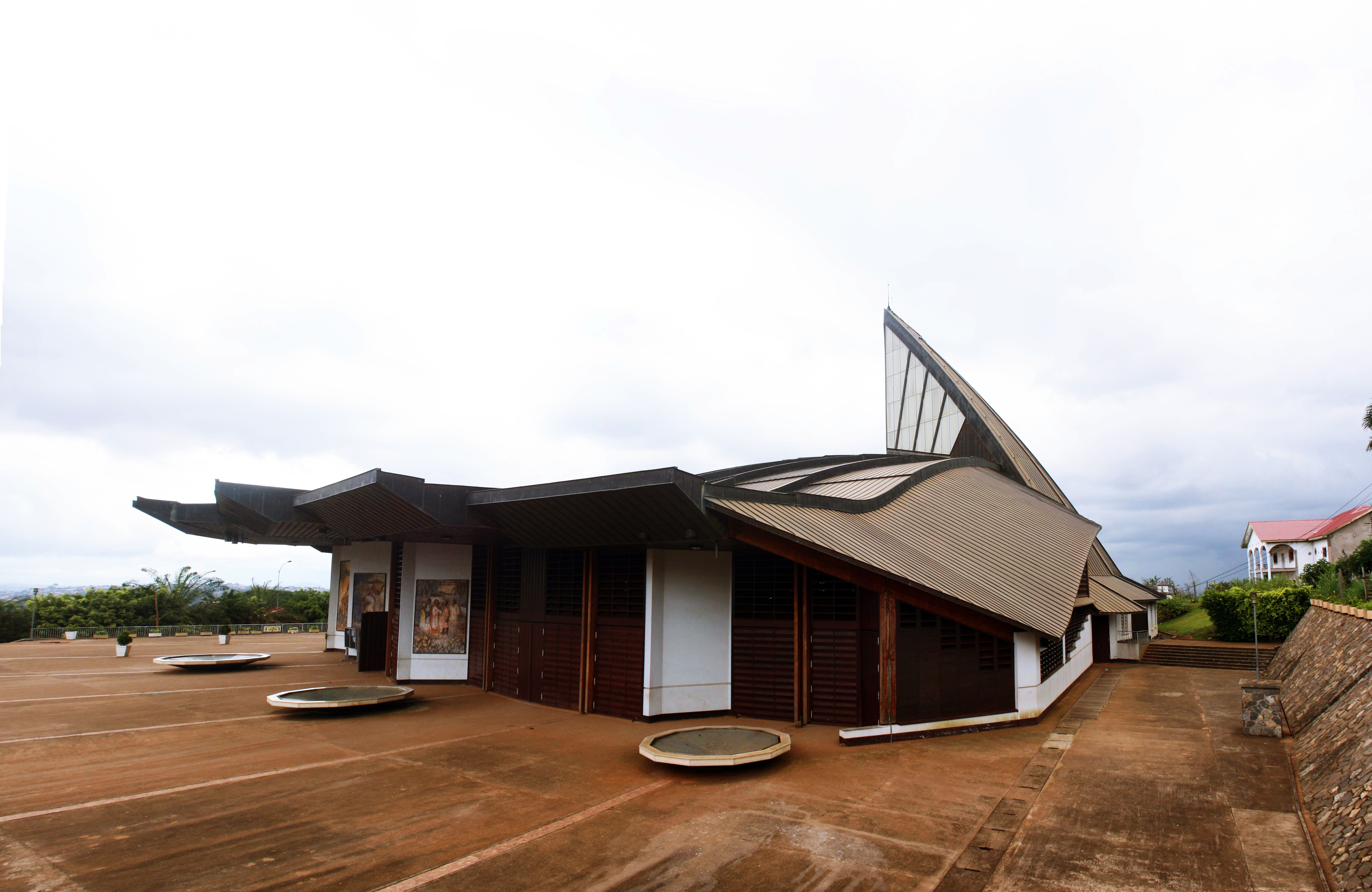
Right view

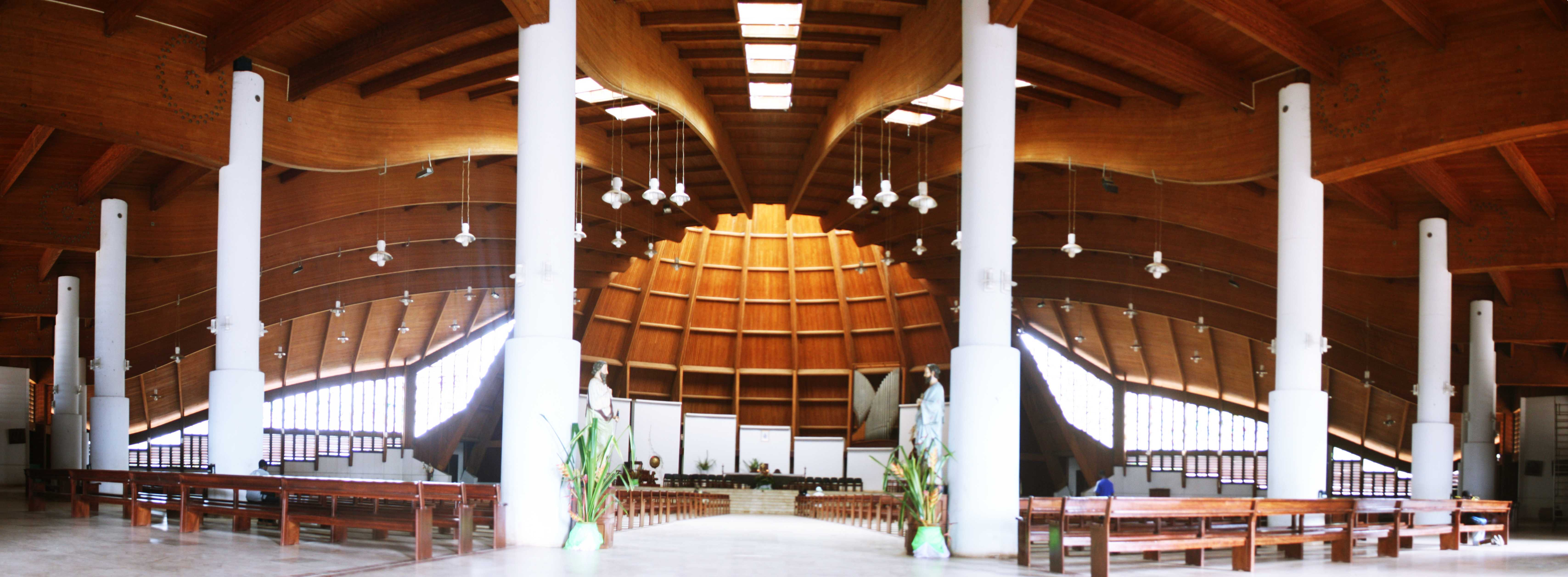
Interior.
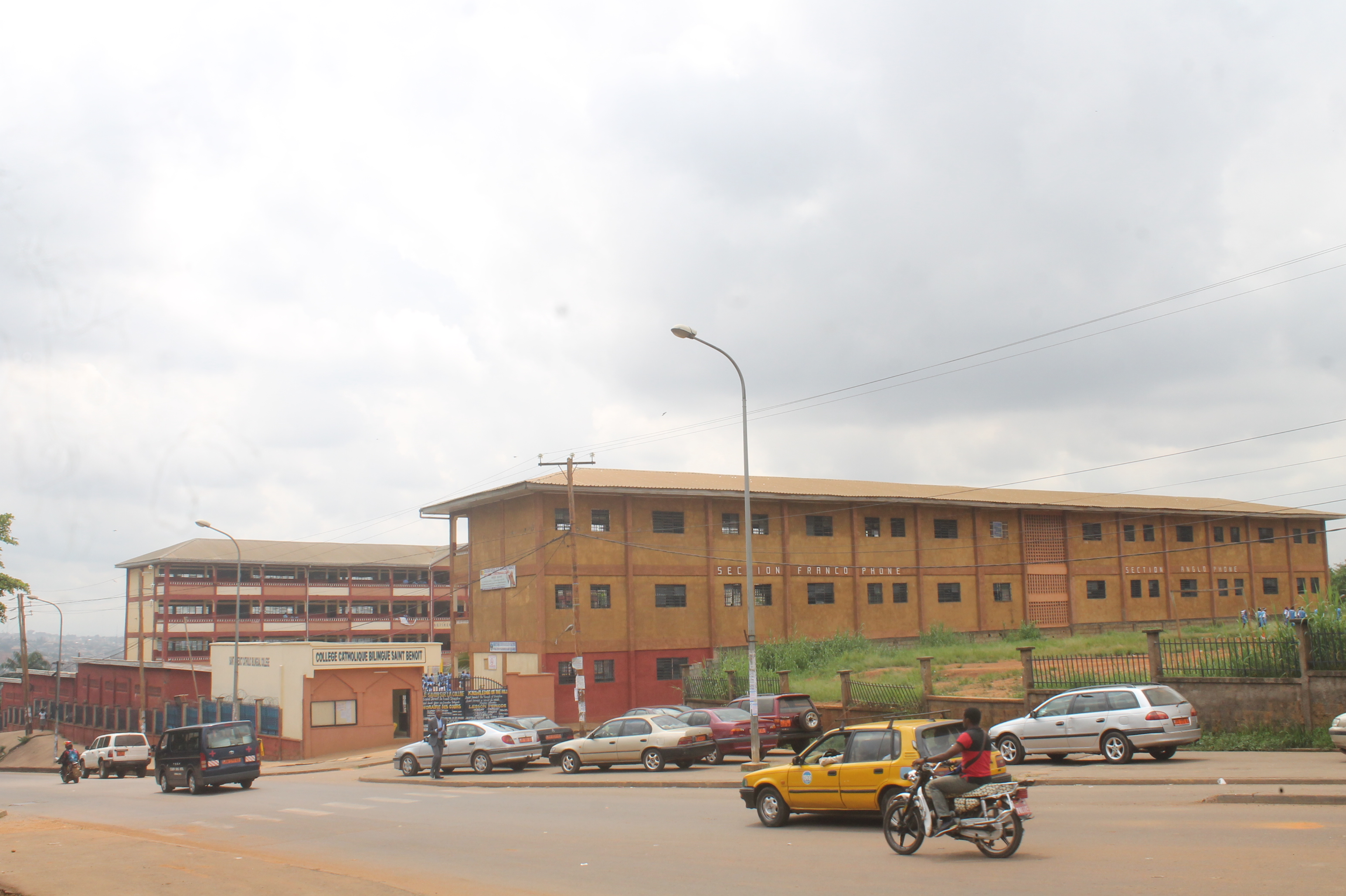
The entrance to Saint Benoit of Mvolyé Catholic Bilingual College

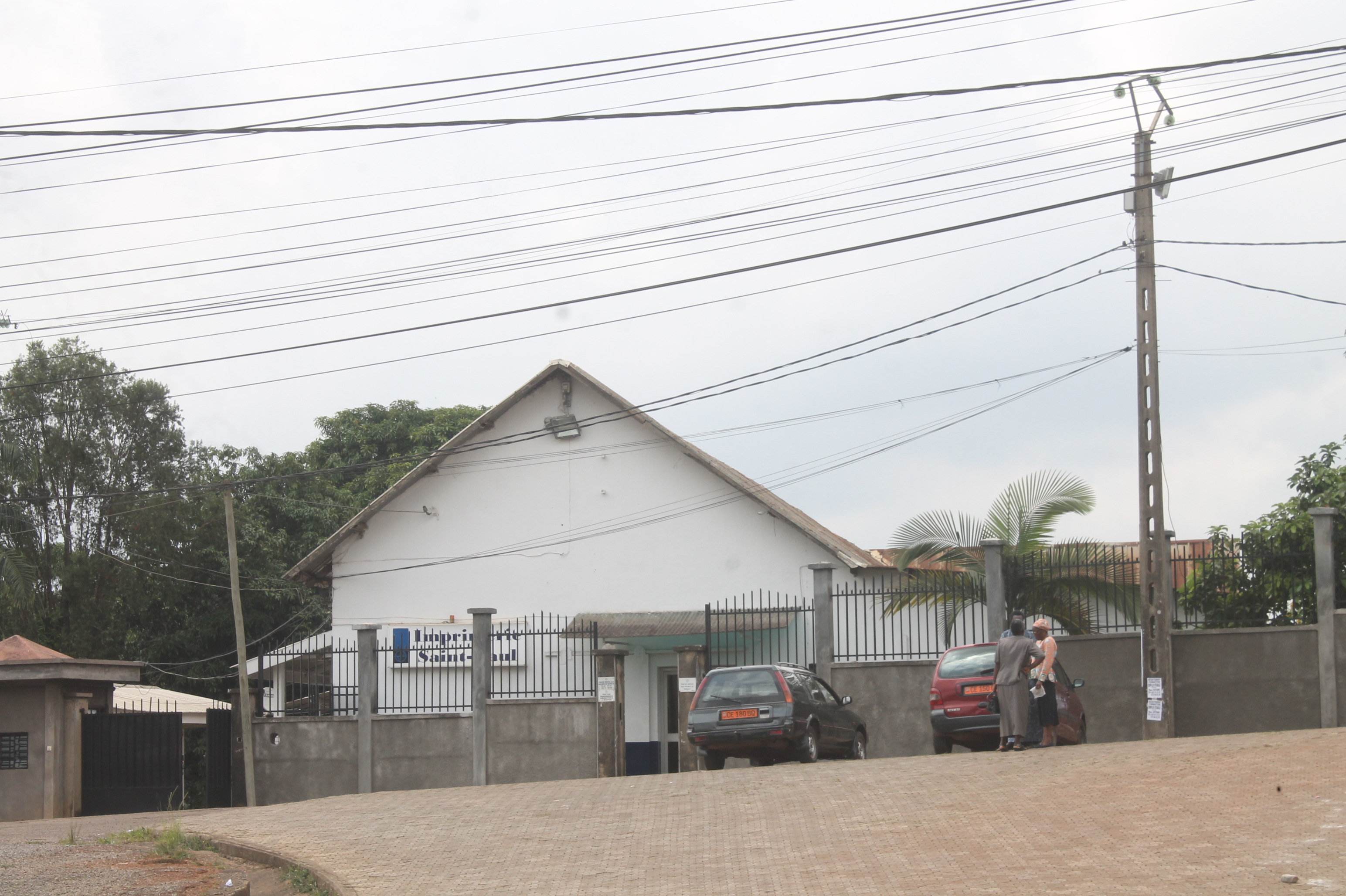
The entrance to the Saint Paul of Mvolyé printing press
