= Mbanga, Cameroon =

Mbanga
- Location in Cameroon
- Coordinates: 4°30′33″N 9°34′5″E
- Country: Cameroon
- Region: Littoral
- Division: Moungo
- Elevation: 149 m (489 ft)

Population (2012)
  - Total: 29,732

Mbanga is a town in western Cameroon. Mbanga has 29,732 citizens.

== Transport ==
The city is a junction station on the western network of Camrail.

== Farming ==
Mbanga is a small town in the Littoral Region of Cameroon. There are around 60,000 inhabitants. Most are coffee and cocoa farmers.

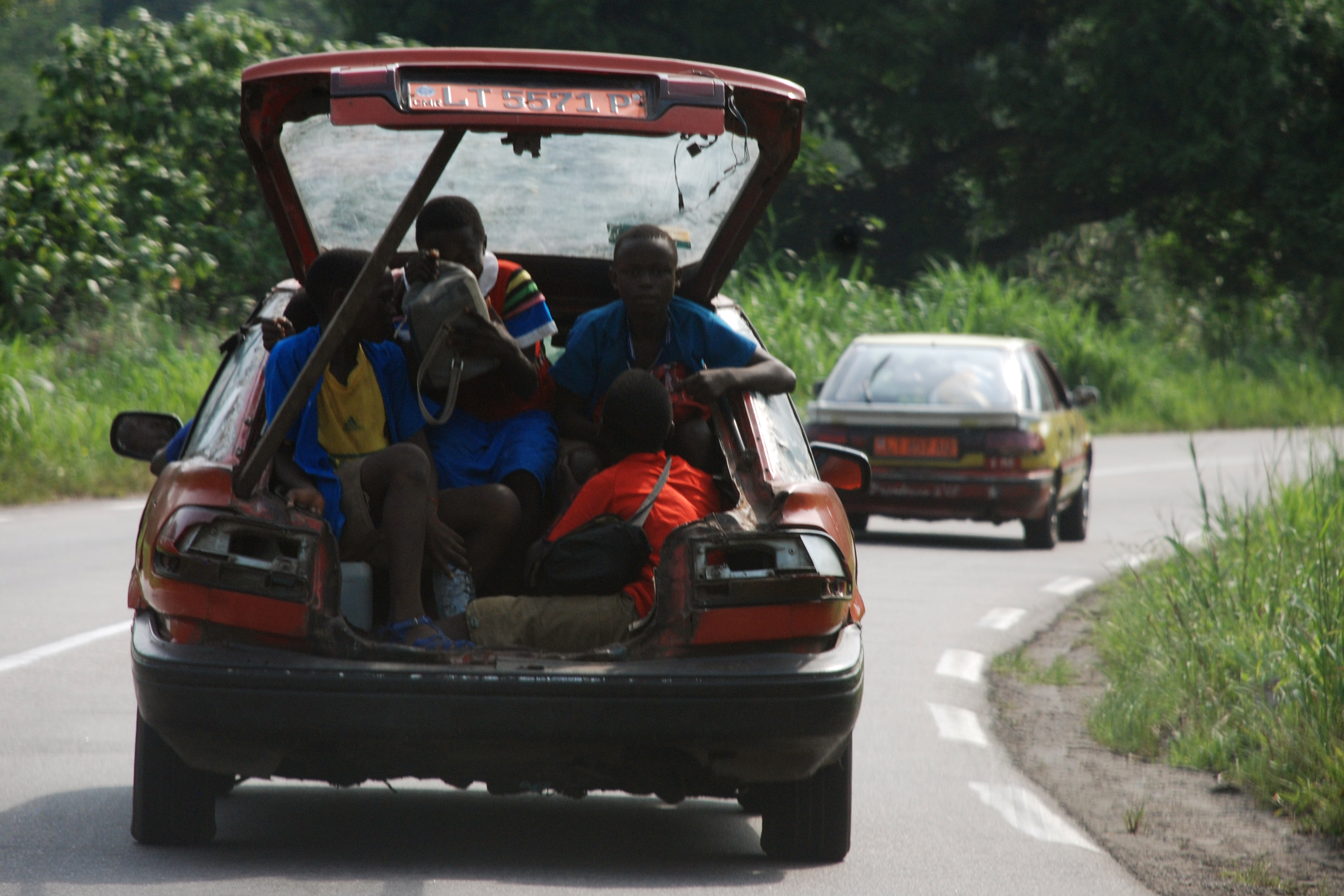
Transport of passengers in Mbanga

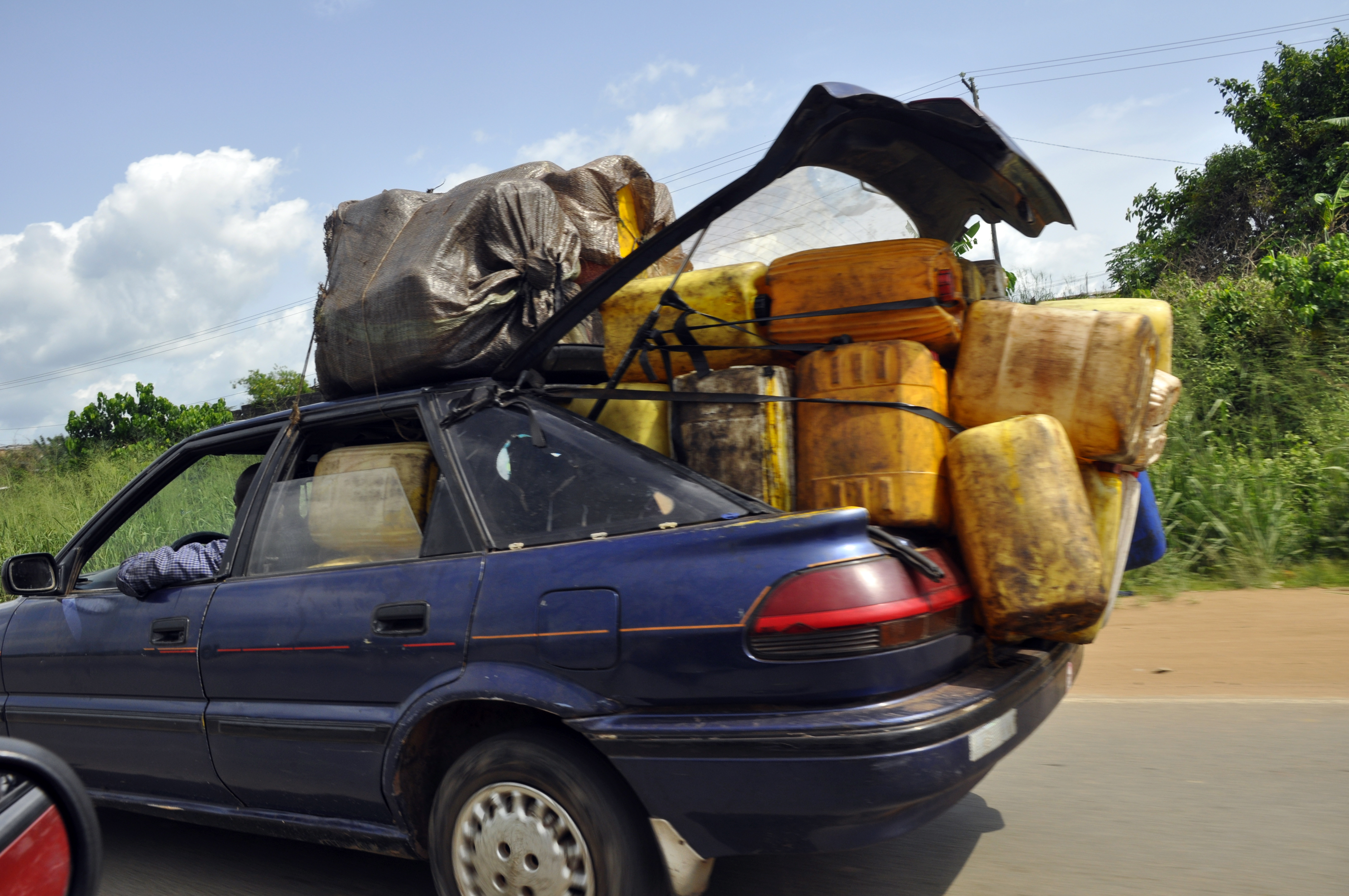
Transport of oil cans in the city of Mbanga in Cameroon

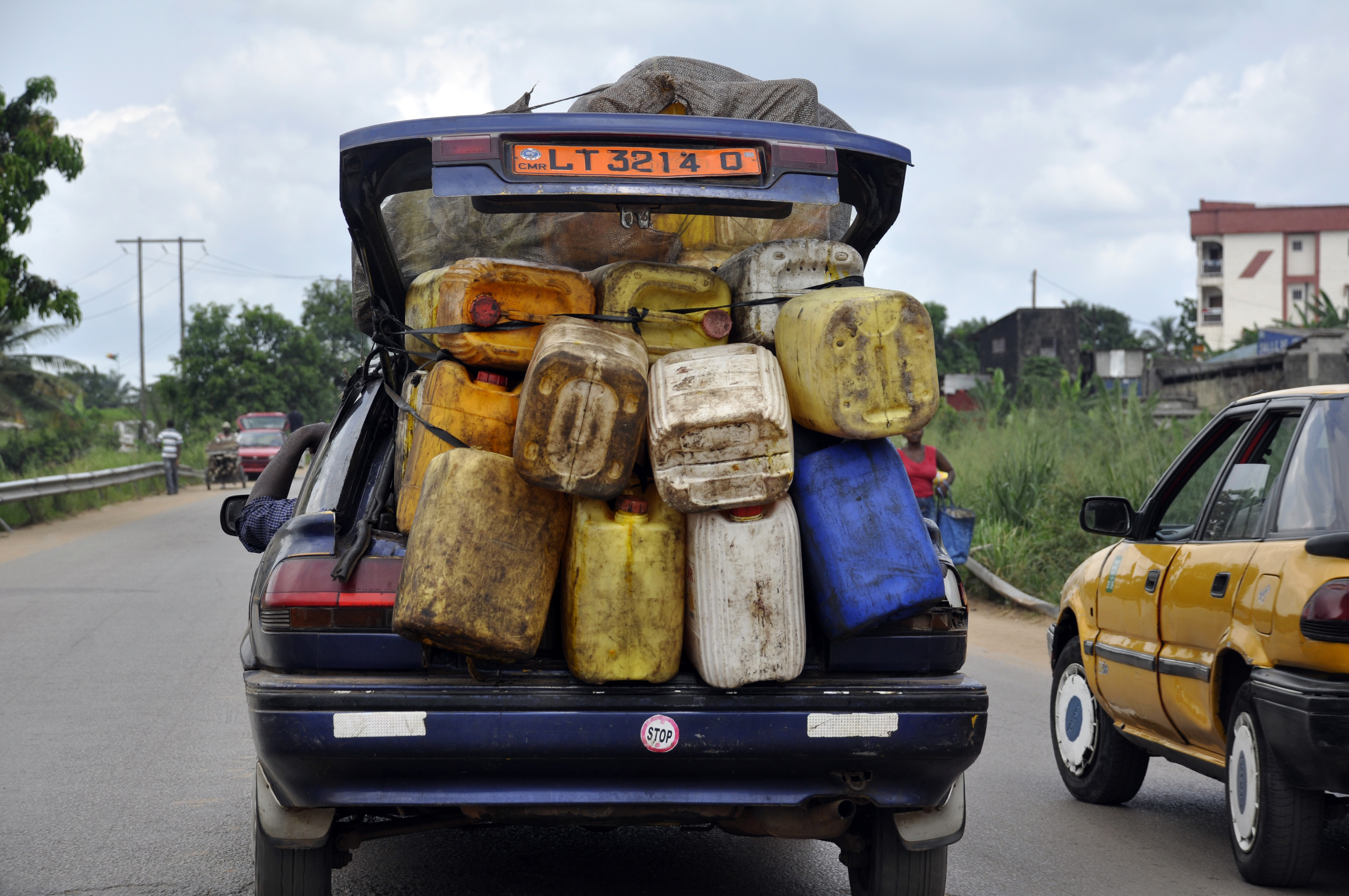
Transport of cans in Mbanga near Douala

== Notable people ==
- Léonard-Claude Mpouma (1938-2019), political figure

== See also ==
- Railway stations in Cameroon
- Transport in Cameroon
