= Nkongsamba =

- City
- Location in Cameroon
- Coordinates: 04°57′N 09°56′E
- Country: Cameroon
- Region: Littoral
- Department: Moungo
- Founded: 1917
- Elevation: 826 m (2,710 ft)

Population (2005)
  - Total: 104,050 (Census)

Nkongsamba is a city in western Cameroon. It is in the Moungo department, which is in the Littoral. As of the 2005 Census, the city had a population of 104,050. It is a centre for the farming of palm oil, bananas and coffee, and is between two mountains, the Manengouba Massif (2,396 metres (7,861 ft)) and Mount Nlonako. The central point is the "Ville"; other areas are measured in "Kilo", for kilometer. Mbo (Manenguba) is one of the languages used locally: in the surrounding district, Kaa and Baneka are used.

== Other places ==
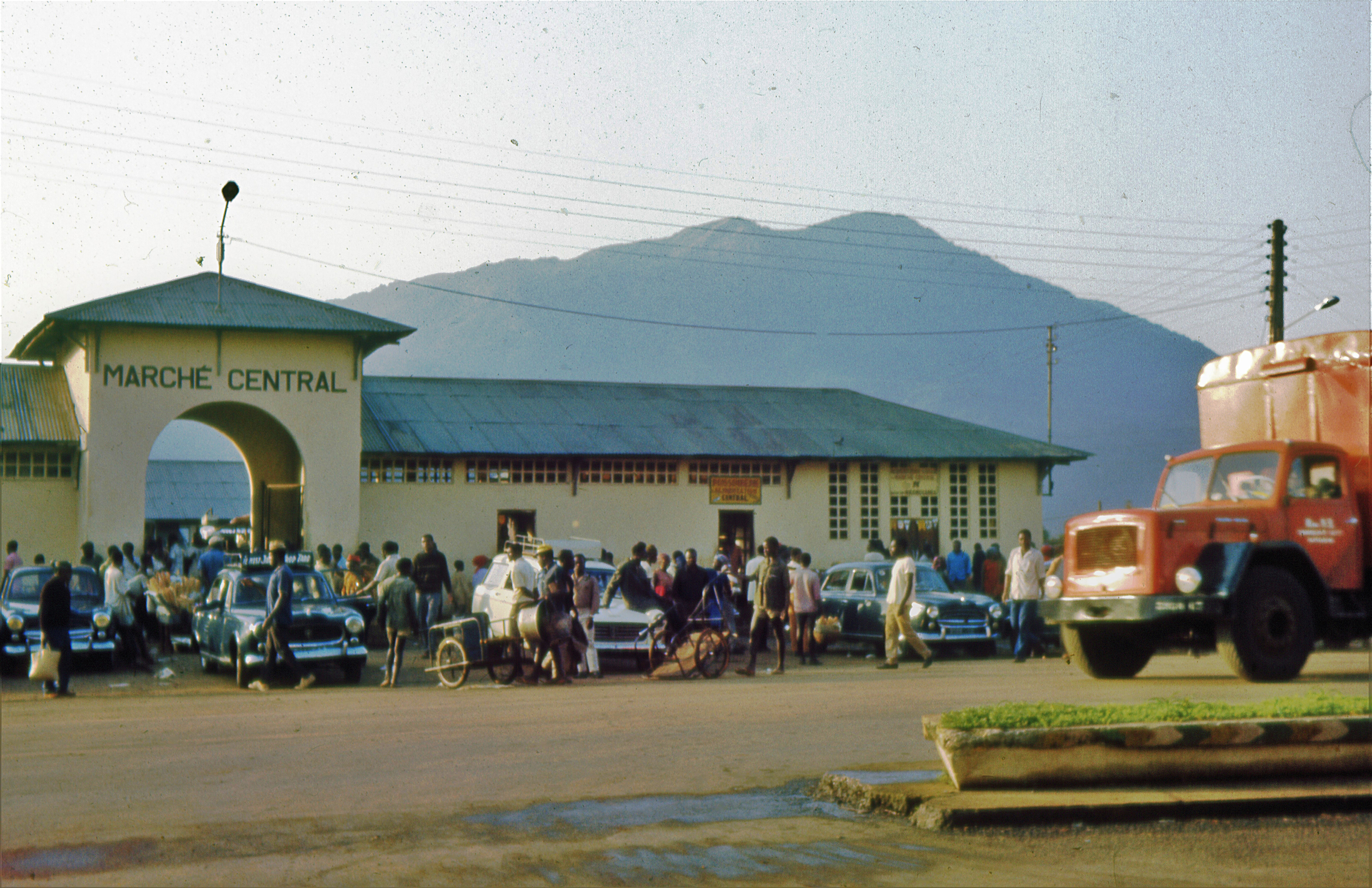
Nkongsamba central market, Cameroon, in 1969

Baré is a village about 10 kilometres (6.2 mi) from Ville. There is a weekly Thursday market at which farmers from the surrounding area gather to sell their goods.

== Transport ==
Nkongsamba was the terminus of the 172-kilometre (107 mi) western railway line from the port of Douala. Completed by German colonists in 1911, the railway line played a critical economic role in facilitating the shipment of agricultural commodities, especially coffee, to Douala. Nkongsamba slid into economic decline with the closure of the last 50-kilometre (31 mi) segment of the line from Mbanga. The town's charming art deco railway station remains but has been converted to housing. The city also has an abandoned airstrip.

== Notable natives ==
- Daniel Kamwa, actor and filmmaker
- Diederrick Joel, football player
- Francine Gálvez, television presenter in Spain
- Samuel Eto'o, football player

== Gallery ==
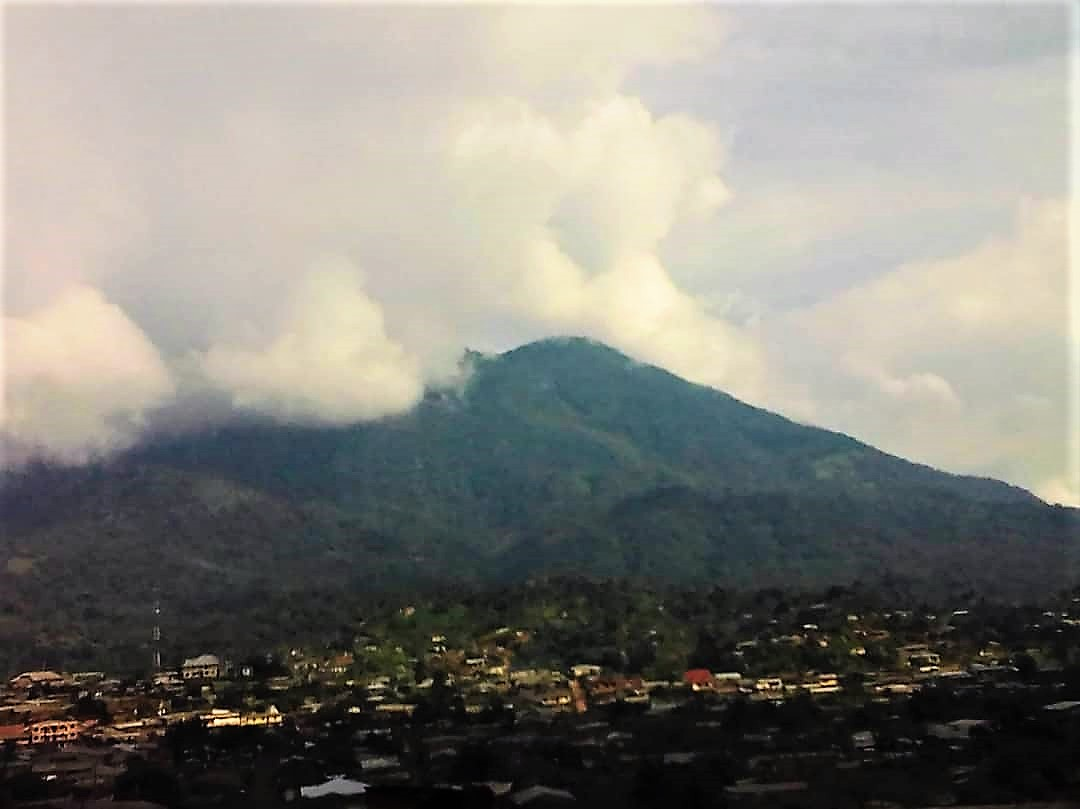
Mount Nllonako

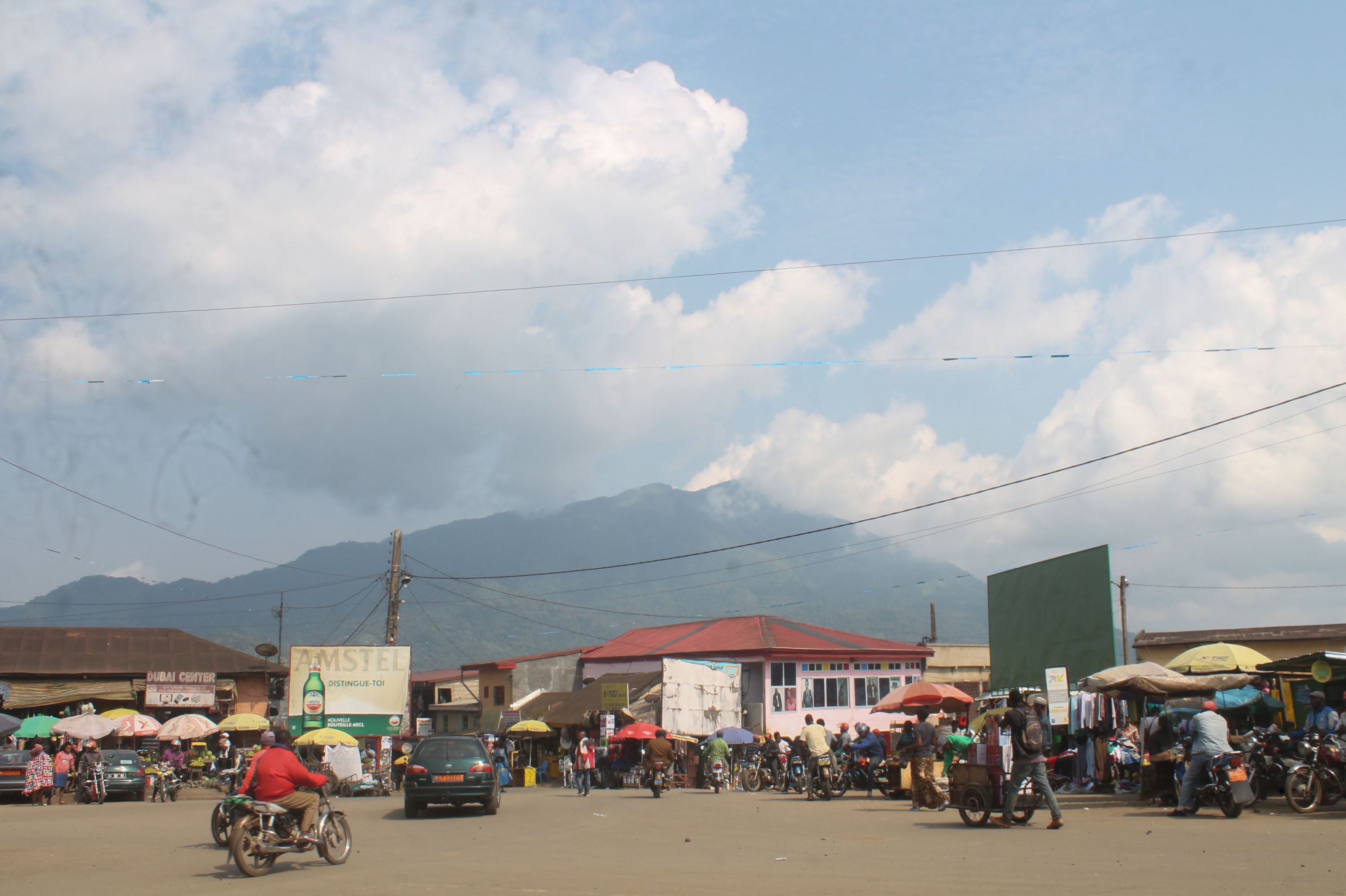
Manengouba Massif from central market

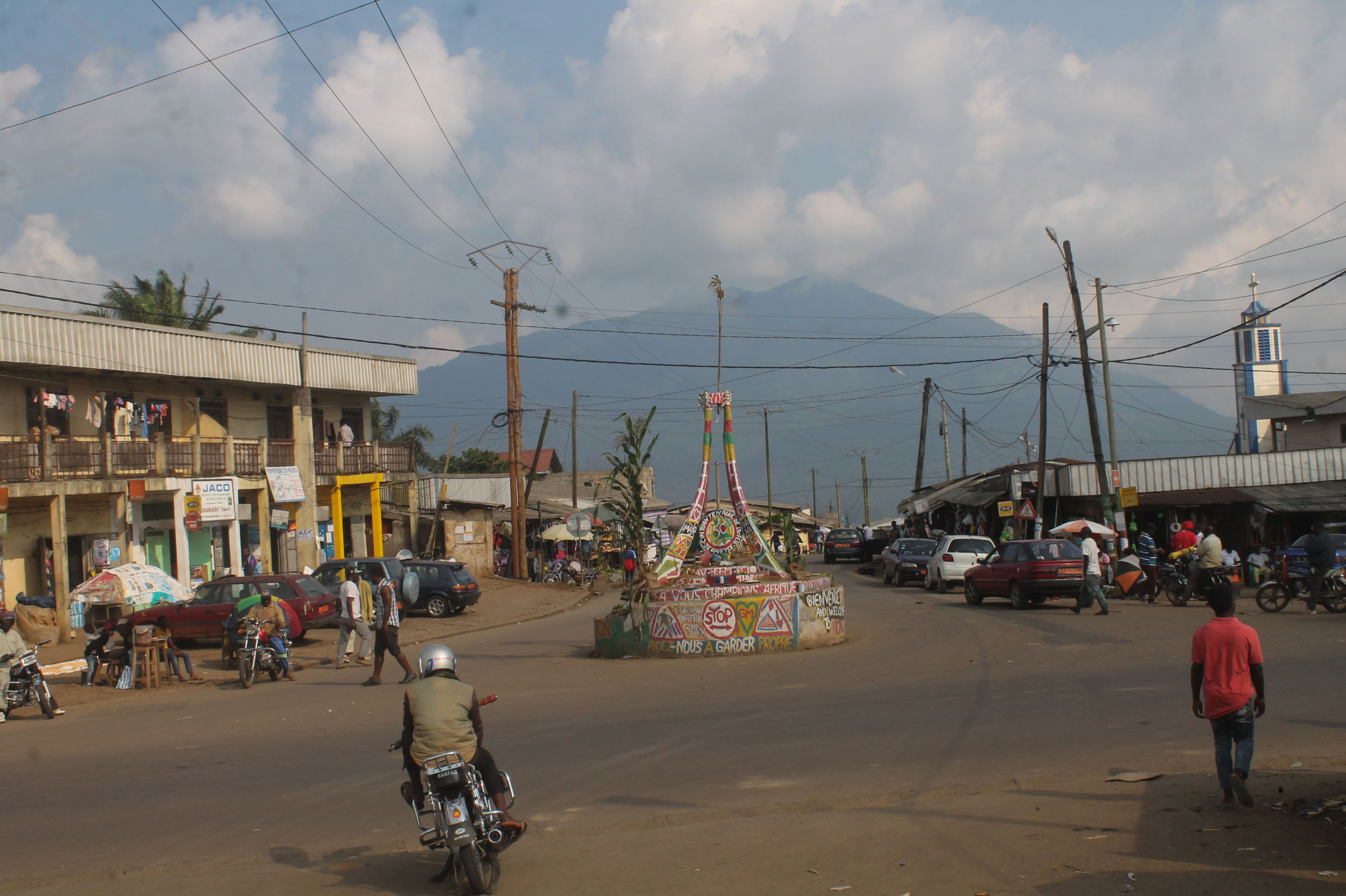
Lele junction

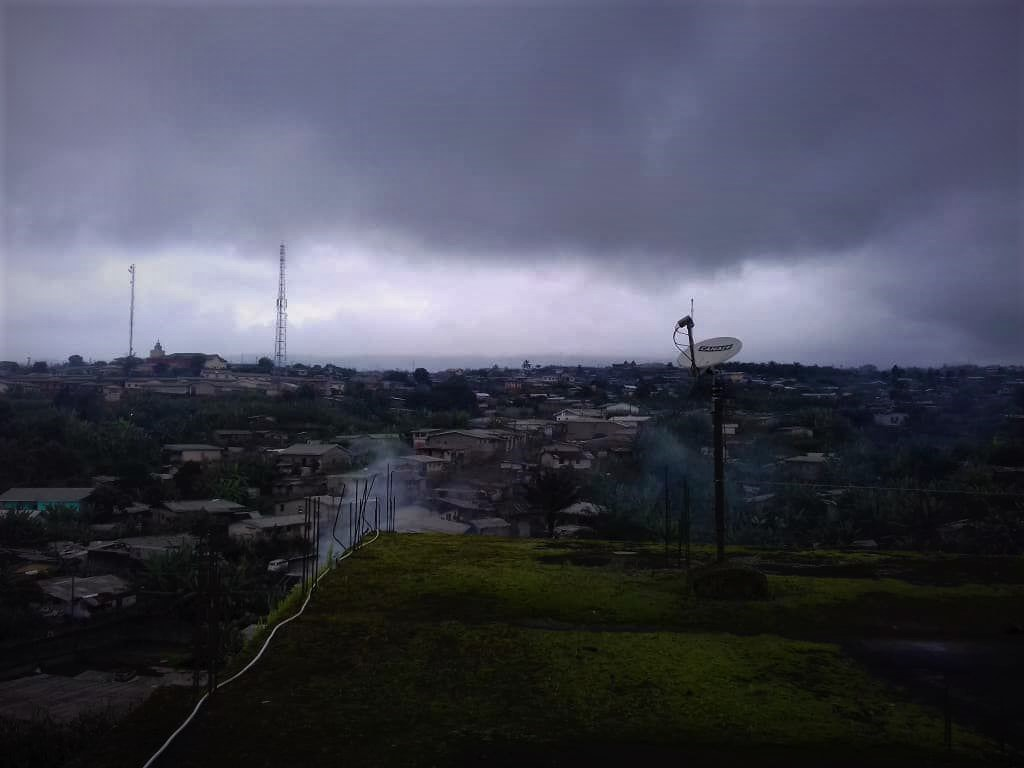
Vallée de 2Kilo

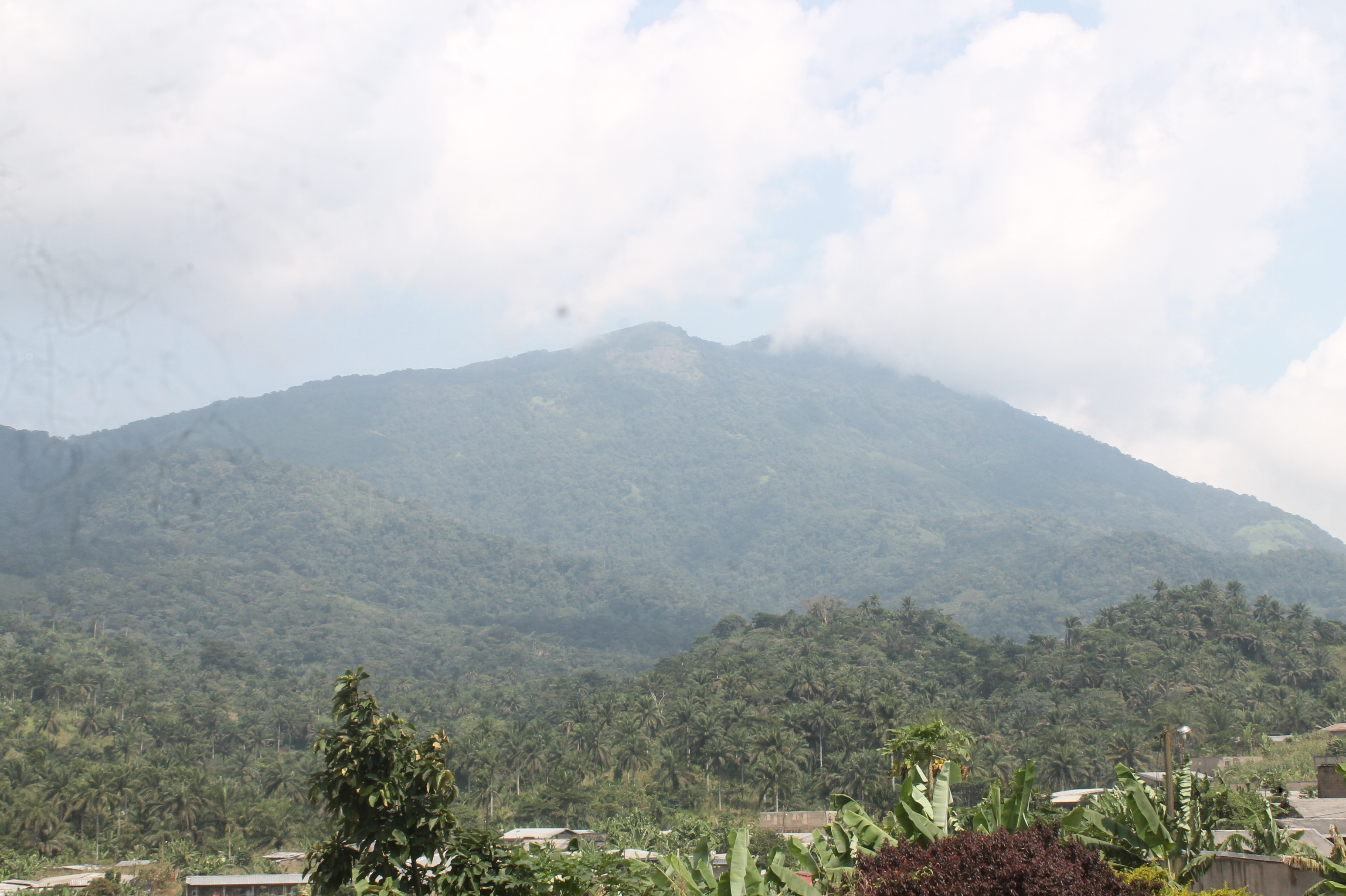
Manengouba mount

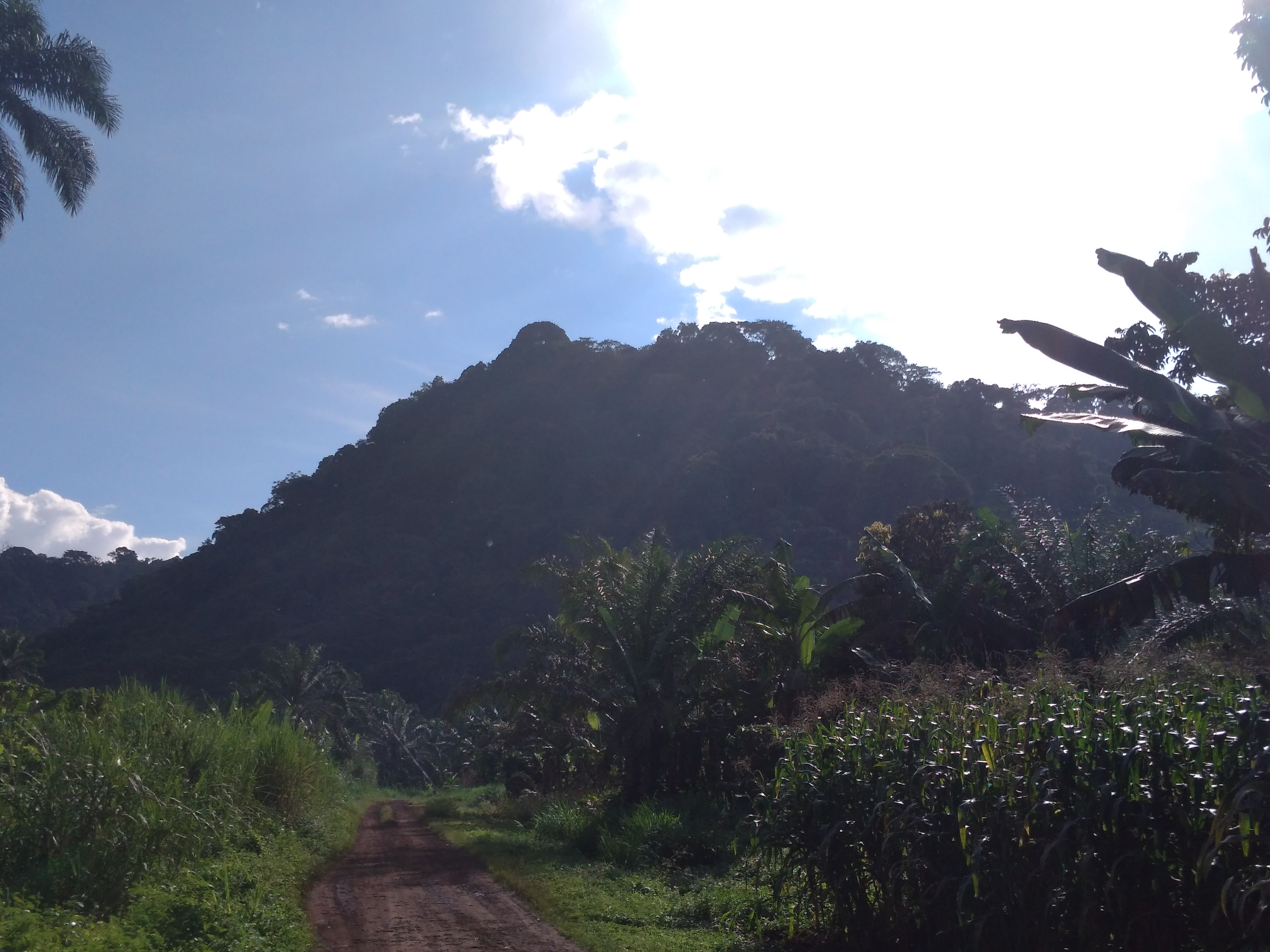
Manengouba massif

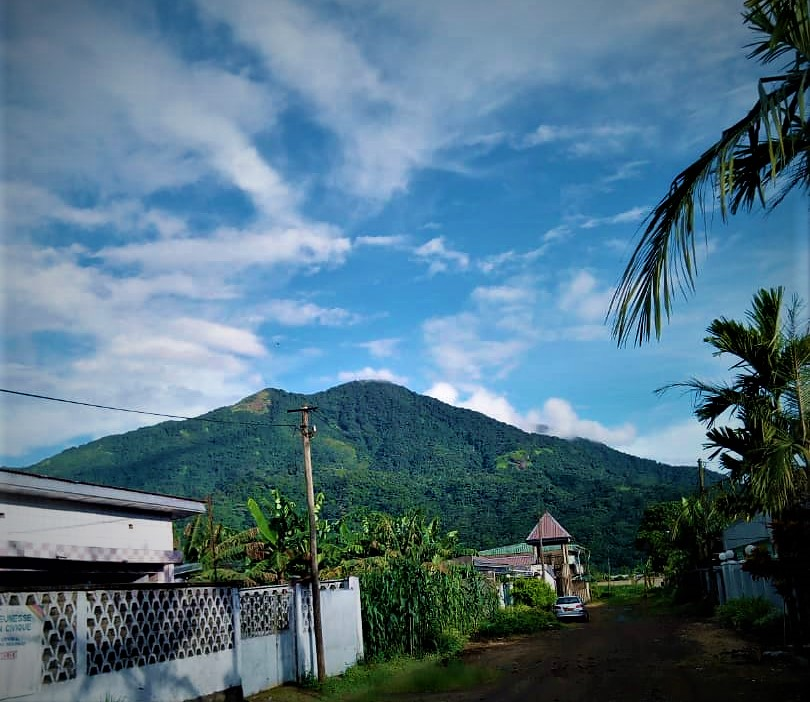
Nlonako Mount

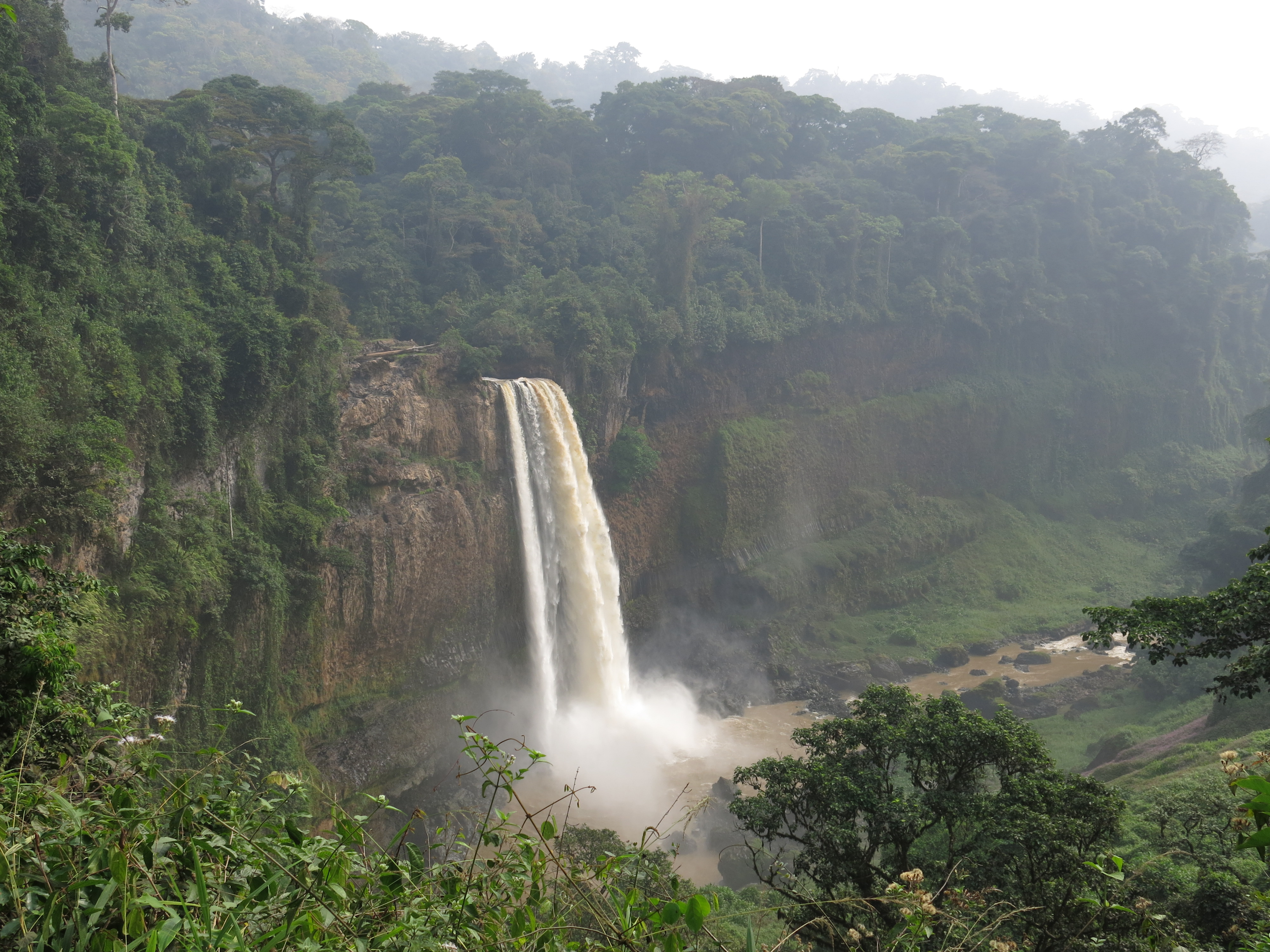

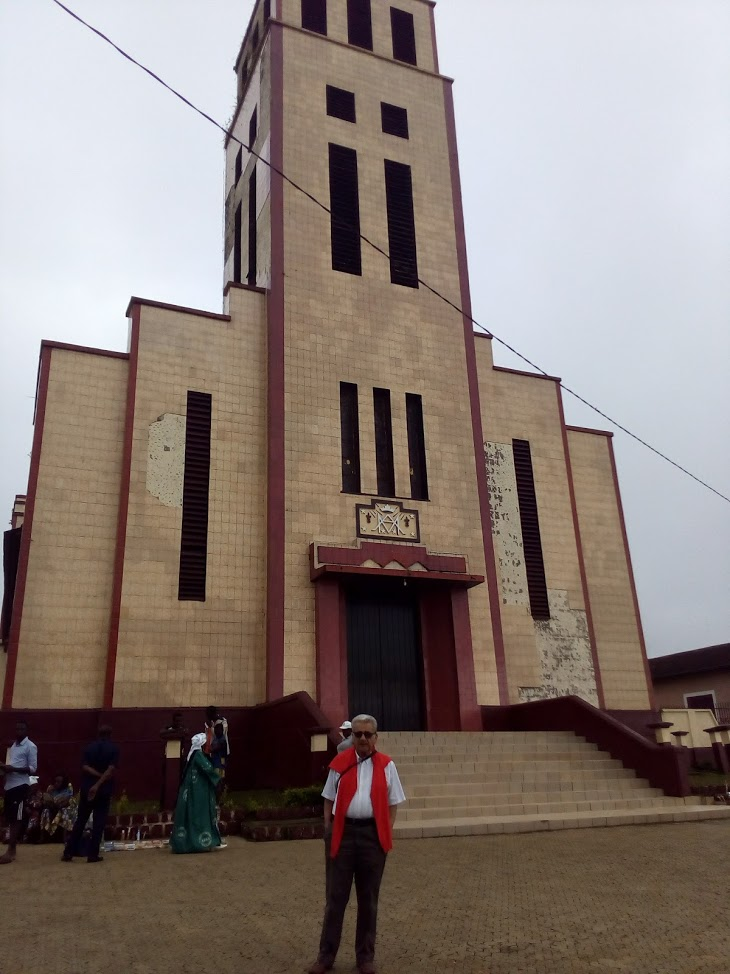
Cattedrale dell'Immacolata a Nkongsamba

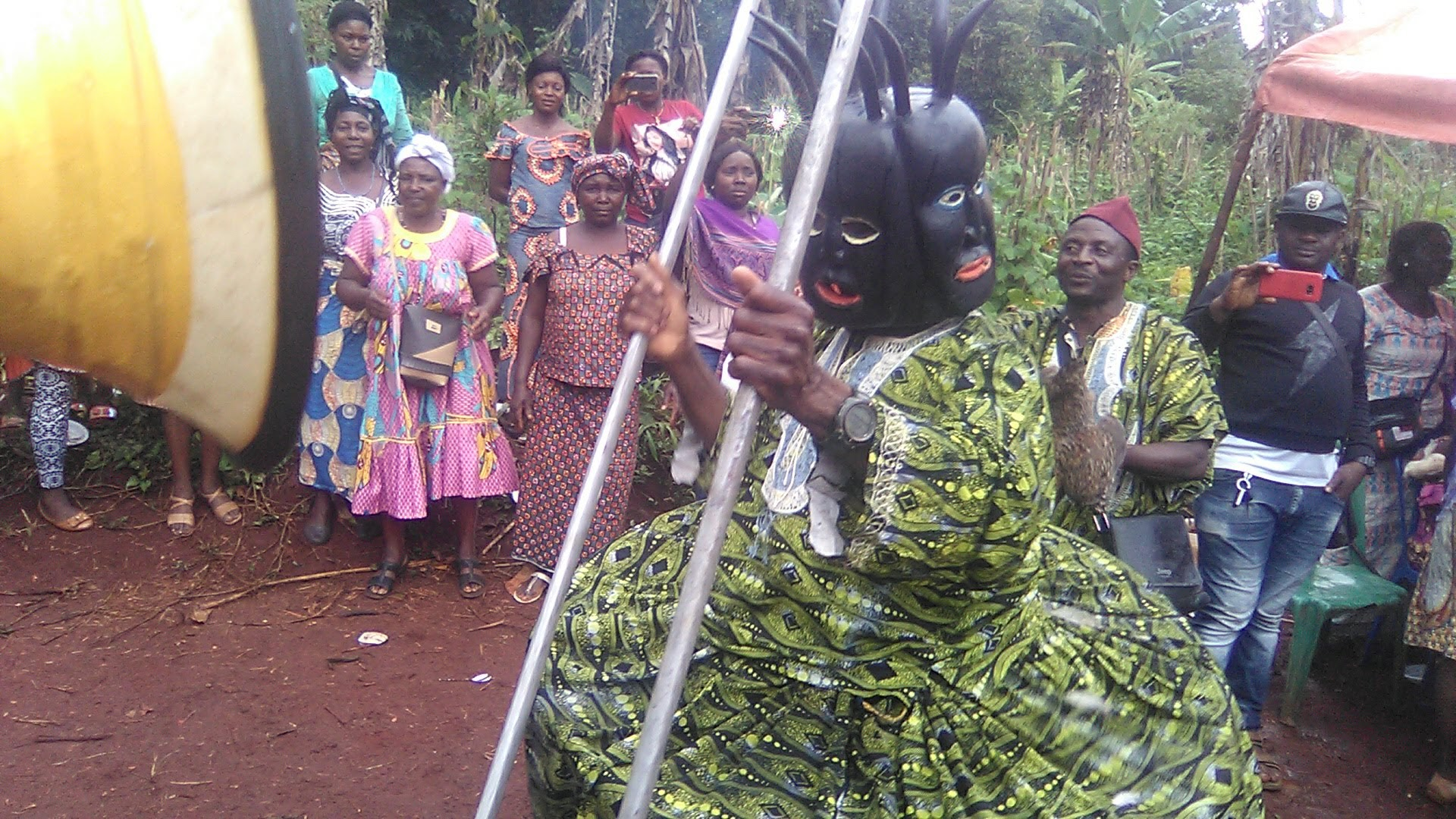
Le Ntsebe est une dance folklorique de la famille Bamougong de Nkongsamba.

== See also ==
- Communes of Cameroon
- Ambazonia
- Transport in Cameroon
