= Deaths in March 2010 =

The following is a list of notable deaths in March 2010.

Entries for each day are listed alphabetically by surname. A typical entry lists information in the following sequence:

- Name, age, country of citizenship at birth, subsequent country of citizenship (if applicable), reason for notability, cause of death (if known), and reference.

== March 2010 ==
=== 1 ===
- Tadur Bala Goud, 78, Indian politician.
- Mary Barr, 84, first female aviator in the US Forest Service.
- Perry Brooks, 55, American football player (Washington Redskins).
- Robert Clarkson, 62, American tax protestor.
- Kristian Digby, 32, British television presenter and director (To Buy or Not to Buy), accidental suffocation.
- Tatyana Dmitrieva, 58, Russian psychiatrist and politician, minister of health (1996–1998).
- Clifton Forbes, 64, Jamaican Olympic athlete.
- Emil Forselius, 35, Swedish actor, suicide.
- Slavko Fras, 81, Slovenian journalist and editor.
- Barry Hannah, 67, American novelist and short story writer, heart attack.
- Vladimir Ilyushin, 82, Russian test pilot.
- Paul Kim Ok-kyun, 84, South Korean Roman Catholic prelate, Titular Bishop of Girba (1985–2001).
- Ruth Kligman, 80, American abstract painter, muse of Jackson Pollock.

=== 2 ===
- Francisco Ada, 75, Northern Mariana Islands politician, first Lieutenant Governor (1978–1982).
- Syed Ali, 67, Indian Olympic gold medal-winning (1964) field hockey player.
- Alexander Tikhomirov, 28, Russian/Islamist militant leader, ideologue leader of the Islamist rebels, killed by Russian troops.
- Judith Bumpus, 70, British arts radio producer.
- Winston Churchill, 69, British politician, MP for Stretford (1970–1983) and Davyhulme (1983–1997), prostate cancer.
- Paul Drayton, 70, American athlete, 1964 Olympic gold and silver medalist, cancer.
- Jón Hnefill Aðalsteinsson, 82, Icelandic scholar.
- Don Kent, 92, American meteorologist (WBZ-TV), natural causes.
- Miloslav Loos, 96, Czech Olympic cyclist.
- Ibragim Khasanov, 72, Russian Olympic sprint canoer.
- Charles B. Moore, 89, American physicist, engineer and meteorologist.
- Eric Morse, 91, Australian cricketer.
- Geoff Myburgh, 81, South African Olympic sailor.
- Joseph Hernández Ochoa, 26, Honduran journalist, shot.
- Omar Pound, 83, American writer and translator.
- Horst Urban, 73, Czech Olympic luger.

=== 3 ===
- Keith Alexander, 53, British footballer (Saint Lucia) and manager, brain aneurysm.
- Johnny Allen, 76, American football player (Washington Redskins), Alzheimer's disease.
- Frank Bertaina, 65, American Major League Baseball player, heart attack.
- Mariya Dolina, 87, Ukrainian dive bomber pilot, Hero of the Soviet Union.
- Franz Eibler, 85, Austrian Olympic weightlifter.
- Michael Foot, 96, British politician, Leader of the Labour Party (1980–1983).
- Marie-Christine Gessinger, 17, Austrian fashion model, car accident.
- Momo Kapor, 72, Serbian writer and painter.
- Big Tiny Little, 79, American musician (The Lawrence Welk Show).
- Yuri Stepanov, 42, Russian actor, car accident.
- John Strohmeyer, 85, American journalist, Pulitzer Prize winner, heart failure.
- Oleg Tyurin, 72, Russian rower, 1964 Olympic gold medalist.

=== 4 ===
- Raimund Abraham, 76, Austrian-born American architect (Austrian Cultural Forum New York), car accident.
- Johnny Alf, 80, Brazilian singer and composer, prostate cancer.
- Vladislav Ardzinba, 64, Georgian politician, separatist President of Abkhazia (1994–2005).
- Big Truck, app. 5, American Thoroughbred racehorse, euthanized.
- André Bouchard, 64, Canadian ecologist and environmentalist, heart attack.
- Etta Cameron, 70, Bahamian-born Danish gospel singer, cancer.
- Hilario Chávez Joya, 82, Mexican Roman Catholic prelate, Bishop of Nuevo Casas Grandes (1977–2004).
- Amalie Christie, 96, Norwegian pianist.
- Samuel J. Eldersveld, 92, American political scientist and politician.
- Joaquim Fiúza, 102, Portuguese sailor, 1952 Olympic bronze medalist.
- Tetsuo Kondo, 80, Japanese politician, Minister of Labour (1991–1992).
- Nan Martin, 82, American actress (The Drew Carey Show, Cast Away, Shallow Hal), emphysema.
- Roger Newman, 69, British-born American actor and television writer (Guiding Light, Passions), cancer.
- Angelo Poffo, 84, American professional wrestler.
- Tony Richards, 76, English footballer (Walsall).
- Joanne Simpson, 86, American meteorologist, first woman to earn a doctorate in meteorology.
- Lolly Vegas, 70, American singer (Redbone), lung cancer.
- Fred Wedlock, 67, British folk musician, complications from pneumonia.

=== 5 ===
- Obaidullah Akhund, Afghan Taliban leader, heart disease.
- Aminah Assilmi, 64-65, American Muslim lecturer, writer and women's rights activist, car accident.
- Donald N. Frey, 87, American product planning manager, co-creator of Ford Mustang, stroke.
- Aleksandr Grave, 89, Russian actor.
- Herta Haas, 96, Slovenian-born Yugoslav Partisan, second wife of Josip Broz Tito.
- Philip Langridge, 70, British tenor, colorectal cancer.
- Andrée Peel, 105, French patriot, World War II Resistance member.
- Charles B. Pierce, 71, American film director (The Legend of Boggy Creek).
- Alberto Ronchey, 83, Italian politician and journalist.
- Wolfgang Schenck, 97, German airman, Luftwaffe flying ace.
- Richard Stapley, 86, British-born American actor (The Three Musketeers), renal failure.
- Hal Trumble, 83, American ice hockey administrator and referee.
- Edgar Wayburn, 103, American environmentalist and conservationist.
- Jan Wilson, 70, Australian politician, Victorian MLA for Dandenong North (1985–1999).

=== 6 ===
- Mansour Amirasefi, 76, Iranian Olympic footballer, cancer.
- Cho Gyeong-chul, 80, South Korean astronomer, heart attack.
- Fiennes Cornwallis, 3rd Baron Cornwallis, 88, British aristocrat.
- Bruce Graham, 84, American architect (Willis Tower, John Hancock Center), Alzheimer's disease.
- Endurance Idahor, 25, Nigerian footballer, heart attack.
- H.M. Koutoukas, 72, American playwright (Medea in the Laundromat), complications of diabetes.
- Mark Linkous, 47, American singer-songwriter (Sparklehorse), suicide by gunshot.
- Carol Marsh, 83, British actress.
- Ifedayo Oladapo, 77, Nigerian engineer.
- Ronald Pettersson, 74, Swedish ice hockey player.
- Jim Roland, 67, American Major League Baseball player.
- Syd Tierney, 86, British politician, MP for Birmingham Yardley (1974–1979).
- Nigel Trench, 7th Baron Ashtown, 93, British diplomat.

=== 7 ===
- Sir Kenneth Dover, 89, British classicist, President of the British Academy (1978–1981).
- Ken Dyer, 63, American football player (Cincinnati Bengals).
- Newton Kulundu, 61, Kenyan politician, Minister of Labour (2006–2008), after long illness.
- Sergo Mikoyan, 80, Russian historian, specialist on Latin America, leukemia.
- Carlos Moratorio, 80, Argentine Olympic silver medal-winning (1964) equestrian.
- Ida Bagus Oka, 74, Indonesian politician, Governor of Bali (1988–1993), heart disease.
- Richard Stites, 78, American historian and author, complications from cancer.
- Tom Thurber, 75, Canadian politician.
- Patrick Topaloff, 65, French actor and humorist, heart attack.
- Ben Westlund, 60, American politician, Oregon State Treasurer (2009–2010), lung cancer.
- William Proctor Wilson, 88, American businessman and philanthropist.

=== 8 ===
- Albert P. Clark, 96, American Air Force officer.
- Tony Imi, 72, British cinematographer (Enemy Mine, Buster, The Sea Wolves).
- David Kimche, 82, Israeli diplomat, Mossad spy (1953–1980), brain cancer.
- Vit Klemes, 77, Czech-born Canadian hydrologist.
- Guy Lapébie, 93, French road bicycle racer.
- Benjamin Rubin, 93, American microbiologist, inventor of the bifurcated vaccination needle.
- Gale Thomson, 90, American First Lady of New Hampshire (1973–1979), wife of Meldrim Thomson, Jr., heart failure.
- Mahama Johnson Traoré, 68, Senegalese film director, after long illness.
- Georgy Zatsepin, 92, Russian astrophysicist.

=== 9 ===
- Antoine Choueiri, 70, Lebanese businessman and media magnate, after long illness.
- Paul Collier, 46, Australian disability advocate, brain haemorrhage.
- Gheorghe Constantin, 77, Romanian footballer and manager.
- Lionel Cox, 80, Australian road bicycle racer, pneumonia.
- Willie Davis, 69, American baseball player (Los Angeles Dodgers), natural causes.
- Dulmatin, 39, Indonesian terrorist, 2002 Bali bombings planner, shot.
- Elizabeth Farrow, 83, American baseball player (AAGPBL).
- Teresa Gutiérrez, 81, Colombian actress, natural causes.
- Doris Haddock, 100, American political activist, complications of respiratory disease.
- Catherine Itzin, 65, American feminist academic, honorary research fellow (University of Bradford), duodenal cancer.
- Jean Kerebel, 91, French Olympic silver (1948) medal-winning athlete.
- Bernard Narokobi, 67, Papua New Guinean politician, diplomat, lawyer and philosopher, after short illness.
- Wilfy Rebimbus, 67, Indian musician, lung cancer.
- Alda Neves da Graça do Espírito Santo, 83, Santomean poet.
- Ricardo Vidal, 79, Chilean Olympic runner.
- Henry Wittenberg, 91, American wrestler, 1948 Olympic gold medalist.

=== 10 ===
- Nate Beasley, 56, American football player.
- Truddi Chase, 74, American autobiographical author.
- Leeann Chin, 77, Chinese-born American restaurateur, founder of Leeann Chin restaurants, after long illness.
- Evelyn Dall, 92, American singer and actress, after long illness.
- Björn von der Esch, 80, Swedish politician.
- Bill Fisher, 84, Australian judge, President of the New South Wales Industrial Commission (1981–1998).
- Corey Haim, 38, Canadian actor (Lucas, The Lost Boys, License to Drive), pneumonia.
- Tim Holland, 79, American backgammon player, emphysema.
- Dorothy Janis, 98, American silent film actress.
- Vincent Mensah, 85, Beninese Roman Catholic prelate, Bishop of Porto Novo (1970–2000).
- Muhammad Sayyid Tantawy, 81, Egyptian Muslim cleric, Grand Imam (Al-Azhar Mosque), heart attack.
- Ricardo Vidal, 79, Chilean long-distance runner.
- George Webb, 92, British traditional jazz musician

=== 11 ===
- Walter Aronsson, 92, Swedish Olympic bobsledder.
- Paul Dunlap, 90, American film composer.
- John Hill, 68, Canadian professional wrestler, Alzheimer's disease.
- Louis Holmes, 99, British-born Canadian ice hockey player and coach.
- Matilde Elena López, 91, Salvadoran poet, essayist and playwright.
- Willie MacFarlane, 79, Scottish footballer and manager.
- David Meza, 51, Honduran journalist, shot.
- Hans van Mierlo, 78, Dutch politician, Minister of Defence (1981–1982), Minister of Foreign Affairs (1994–1998), Deputy Prime Minister (1994–1998).
- Charles Moore, 79, American photographer.
- Bernard Novak, 90, American politician, member of the Pennsylvania House of Representatives (1969–1980).
- Merlin Olsen, 69, American football player (Los Angeles Rams), member of Pro Football Hall of Fame, and actor (Little House on the Prairie, Father Murphy), mesothelioma.
- Arnall Patz, 89, American ophthalmologist, heart disease.
- Leena Peltonen-Palotie, 57, Finnish geneticist, bone cancer.
- Sandy Scott, 75, Canadian professional wrestler, pancreatic cancer.
- Turhan Selçuk, 87, Turkish cartoonist.
- Elena Shvarts, 61, Russian poet.
- Elisabeth de Stroumillo, 83, British journalist, scooter accident.
- Colin Wells, 76, British historian and archaeologist.

=== 12 ===
- David Ahenakew, 76, Canadian First Nations leader and politician, cancer.
- Hameeduddin Aquil Husami, 77, Indian Islamic scholar.
- Bob Attersley, 76, Canadian ice hockey player, 1960 Winter Olympics silver medalist.
- Miguel Delibes, 89, Spanish author, journalist and scholar, colorectal cancer.
- Lesley Duncan, 66, British singer-songwriter, cerebrovascular disease.
- Hanna-Renate Laurien, 81, German politician.
- Fatima Meer, 81, South African academic, screenwriter and anti-apartheid activist, stroke.
- Aleksandr Minayev, 51, Russian football player and coach.
- Charles Muscatine, 89, American Chaucer scholar and advocate for education reform, lung infection.
- Dao Paratee, 28, Thai actress and model, car accident.
- Hugh Robertson, 70, Scottish footballer (Dundee F.C.).
- Hamish Scott, 86, Scottish rugby union player (North of Scotland, national team).
- Ian Sinfield, 75, Australian Olympic runner.
- Glauco Villas Boas, 53, Brazilian cartoonist (Geraldão), shot.
- Boris Yugai, 52, Kyrgyz army major general, chief of the General Staff of Armed Forces (2007–2008).

=== 13 ===
- Jerry Adler, 91, American harmonicist, prostate cancer.
- Sir Michael Angus, 79, British businessman, Chairman of Unilever (1986–1992).
- Charlie Ashcroft, 83, English footballer (Liverpool F.C.).
- Sir Ian Axford, 76, New Zealand space scientist, after long illness.
- Jean Ferrat, 79, French singer, cancer.
- Momčilo Gavrić, 71, Croatian-born American football player (San Francisco 49ers).
- Peter Harburn, 78, English football player (Brighton & Hove Albion).
- He Pingping, 21, Chinese dwarf, shortest man who was able to walk, heart complications.
- Terry Heffernan, 58, New Zealand politician, cancer.
- Édouard Kargu, 84, French footballer.
- Cliff Livingston, 79, American football player (N.Y. Giants) and stuntman, complications from dementia with Lewy bodies and Parkinson's disease.
- Leon Manley, 83, Canadian football player (Edmonton Eskimos).
- Andrzej Marcinkowski, 81, Polish lawyer and politician, acting Minister of Justice (1991), after long illness.
- Neville Meade, 61, Jamaican-born British boxer.
- Gary Mittelholtz, 55, Canadian journalist (CBC Radio), heart attack
- Fouad Zakariyya, 82-83, Egyptian philosopher.

=== 14 ===
- Chimen Abramsky, 93, British historian, expert in Jewish studies and Hebrew literature.
- Nahúm Elí Palacios Arteaga, 36, Honduran journalist and television news director, shot.
- Hale Ashcraft, 89, American politician.
- Marcel Bacou, 74, French football referee.
- Carmen Capalbo, 84, American theater director, emphysema.
- Edward Eugene Claplanhoo, 81, American Makah leader and veteran, first Makah college graduate, founder of the Makah Museum.
- Junior Collins, 82, American horn player.
- Corsica Joe, 90, American professional wrestler.
- Cherie DeCastro, 87, American singer (The DeCastro Sisters), pneumonia.
- Edmund Dinis, 85, American prosecutor, investigated Chappaquiddick incident, complications of treatment for lymphoma.
- Pat Fanning, 91, Irish hurler (Waterford), President of the Gaelic Athletic Association (1970–1973).
- Gumersindo Gómez, 81, Argentine Olympic runner.
- Peter Graves, 83, American actor (Mission: Impossible, Airplane!, Stalag 17), heart attack.
- Vinda Karandikar, 91, Indian poet and writer, after short illness.
- Hernán Llerena, 81, Peruvian Olympic cyclist.
- Arnold Loxam, 93, British organist.
- Konrad Ruhland, 78, German musicologist.
- Felipe Sapag, 93, Argentine politician.
- Der Scutt, 75, American architect (Trump Tower, One Astor Plaza, Reading Public Museum), liver failure.
- Janet Simpson, 65, British Olympic track and field athlete, heart attack.
- Altie Taylor, 62, American football player (Detroit Lions).
- Lisle Wilson, 66, American actor.

=== 15 ===
- W. H. Atkinson, 75, American racing driver.
- Emilia Boncodin, 55, Filipino Secretary of DBM (1998, 2001–2005), ZTE scandal whistleblower, cardiac arrest.
- Joseph Galdon, 81, Filipino writer and academic.
- Cliff Garner, 72, American racing driver.
- Günther Heidemann, 77, German Olympic bronze medal-winning (1952) boxer.
- Robert Hodgins, 89, South African artist, lung cancer.
- Ken Holcombe, 91, American baseball player (Chicago White Sox).
- Ashok Kumar, 53, British MP for Langbaurgh (1991–1992) and MSEC (1997–2010), natural causes.
- Ron Lundy, 75, American radio disc jockey (WABC, WCBS-FM), heart attack.
- Sam Mtukudzi, 21, Zimbabwean musician, car accident.
- Patricia Wrightson, 88, Australian children's writer.

=== 16 ===
- Abdul Haq Baloch, 63, Pakistani scholar and politician.
- Herb Cohen, 77, American record company executive, manager of Frank Zappa.
- Billy Hoeft, 77, American Major League Baseball All-Star pitcher (Detroit Tigers, Baltimore Orioles).
- Filip Kapisoda, 22, Montenegrin model, suicide by gunshot.
- Hachiro Maekawa, 97, Japanese baseball player (Yomiuri Giants), respiratory failure.
- Ksenija Pajčin, 32, Serbian pop singer, shot.
- Jane Sherman, 101, American writer and dancer.
- David J. Steinberg, 45, American actor (Willow, Epic Movie), suicide by hanging.
- Elena Tairova, 18, Russian chess player, woman grandmaster and international master, after long illness.
- Juan Adolfo Turri, 59, Argentine Olympic athlete.

=== 17 ===
- Abdellah Blinda, 58, Moroccan footballer, heart attack.
- Tim Chadwick, 47, New Zealand artist, traffic collision.
- Alex Chilton, 59, American musician (Big Star, The Box Tops), heart attack.
- Wayne Collett, 60, American athlete, 1972 Summer Olympics silver medalist, cancer.
- Sid Fleischman, 90, American children's writer, cancer.
- Van Fletcher, 85, American baseball player (Detroit Tigers).
- Charlie Gillett, 68, British radio presenter, music writer and record producer, after long illness.
- Peter Gowland, 93, American glamour photographer and actor, hip surgery.
- Ștefan Gheorghiu, 83, Romanian violinist.
- Johnnie High, 80, American country music impresario, heart failure.
- Pak Nam-gi, 76, North Korean public official, executed by firing squad.
- Robert Michael White, 85, American X-15 test pilot.

=== 18 ===
- Amanda Castro, 47, Honduran poet, respiratory disease.
- Julinho, 90, Portuguese footballer.
- Herb Denenberg, 80, American journalist (WCAU), consumer advocate, Pennsylvania insurance commissioner, heart attack.
- Donald P. Kelly, 88, American leveraged buyout investor (Beatrice Foods), cancer.
- Chick Lang Jr., 83, American businessman, general manager of Maryland Jockey Club, natural causes.
- Herbert G. Lewin, 95, American politician, candidate in the 1988 Presidential election, heart failure.
- Fess Parker, 85, American actor (Davy Crockett, Daniel Boone, Old Yeller).
- Zygmunt Pawłowicz, 82, Polish Roman Catholic prelate, Auxiliary Bishop of Gdańsk (1985–2005).
- Paul Warner Powell, 31, American convicted murderer, executed by electric chair.
- Billy Wolfe, 86, Scottish politician, National Chairman of the Scottish National Party (1969–1979).
- Konstantin Yeryomenko, 39, Russian futsal player, European champion (1999), heart attack.
- Jerry York, 71, American businessman, executive director of Apple Inc., cerebral hemorrhage.

=== 19 ===
- Carlo Chenis, 55, Italian Roman Catholic prelate, Bishop of Civitavecchia-Tarquinia (since 2006).
- Bob Curtis, 60, English footballer (Charlton Athletic, Mansfield Town), motor neurone disease.
- Gerald Drucker, 84, British double bass player.
- Wayne S. Ewing, 81, American politician.
- John Hicklenton, 42, British comics artist (2000 AD), assisted suicide.
- Ted Hooper, 91, British beekeeper.
- George Lane, 95, Hungarian-born British World War II commando, pneumonia.
- Roberto de la Madrid, 88, Mexican politician, Governor of Baja California (1977–1983), first American-born governor of a Mexican state.
- Bill McIntyre, 80, American actor (Dallas), natural causes.
- Elinor Smith, 98, American aviator.
- Dottie Thompson, 88, American festival organizer, co-founder of the Merrie Monarch Festival, complications from pneumonia.
- Raúl de la Torre, 72, Argentine film director (Pobre mariposa, Funes, un gran amor), cardiac arrest.

=== 20 ===
- Susanna Amatuni, 86, Soviet Armenian art critic and musicologist.
- István Bilek, 77, Hungarian chess grandmaster.
- W. E. Bradley, 86, American politician.
- Alan Cameron, 80, Australian rugby union player, national team.
- Harry Carpenter, 84, British sports commentator and television presenter.
- Liz Carpenter, 89, American feminist author, press secretary to Lady Bird Johnson (1963–1969), pneumonia.
- Claiborne Cary, 78, American actress and cabaret performer, complications from Parkinson's disease.
- Clodomiro Castilla, 50, Colombian journalist, shot.
- Dorothy Corrigan, 96, Canadian politician, first female Mayor of Charlottetown (1968–1972).
- Chicka Dixon, 81, Australian Aboriginal activist, asbestosis.
- Ebet Kadarusman, 73, Indonesian television and radio presenter, stroke.
- Ray Fonseca, 56, American hula master, heart attack.
- Fred Heineman, 80, American politician, Representative from North Carolina (1995–1997), natural causes.
- John Eric Holmes, 80, American science fiction and fantasy author.
- Girija Prasad Koirala, 85, Nepalese politician, Prime Minister (four terms), multiple organ dysfunction syndrome.
- Ian Knight, 69, British stage designer, cancer.
- Rihards Kotāns, 54, Latvian Olympic bobsledder.
- Naim Kryeziu, 92, Albanian footballer.
- Erwin Lehn, 90, German musician and conductor.
- Robin Milner, 76, British computer scientist, heart attack.
- Ai Ogawa, 62, American poet, breast cancer.
- Otto Otepka, 94, American Deputy Director of the Department of State's Office of Security (1959–1962).
- Fernando Iório Rodrigues, 80, Brazilian Roman Catholic prelate, Bishop of Palmeira dos Índios (1985–2006).
- Mikel Scicluna, 80, Canadian professional wrestler, liver cancer.
- Stewart Udall, 90, American politician, Secretary of the Interior (1961–1969), fall.
- Yang Lina, 47, Singaporean actress (Samsui Women), uterine cancer.

=== 21 ===
- Vivian Blake, 53, Jamaican drug lord, heart attack.
- Franco Gualdrini, 86, Italian Roman Catholic prelate, Bishop of Terni-Narni-Amelia (1983–2000).
- Lou Jankowski, 78, Canadian ice hockey player (Chicago Blackhawks, Detroit Red Wings).
- Takeo Kimura, 91, Japanese art director.
- Brownie Ledbetter, 77, American civil rights activist.
- Margaret Moth, 58, New Zealand photojournalist (CNN), colorectal cancer.
- Wolfgang Wagner, 90, German director (Bayreuth Festival), natural causes.
- Susana, Lady Walton, 83, Argentine writer, widow of composer Sir William Walton, natural causes.

=== 22 ===
- Sir James Black, 85, British physician, Nobel Laureate in Medicine (1988).
- Özhan Canaydın, 67, Turkish basketball player, president of Galatasaray S.K. (2002–2008), pancreatic cancer.
- Diz Disley, 78, Canadian-born British jazz guitarist.
- Ky Fan, 95, American mathematician.
- Ella Mae Johnson, 106, American social worker and author.
- Leroy Matthiesen, 88, American Roman Catholic prelate, Bishop of Amarillo (1980–1997).
- Emil Schulz, 71, German boxer.
- Valentina Tolkunova, 63, Russian singer, People's Artist of RSFSR, brain tumor.

=== 23 ===
- Bob Abbott, 77, American judge.
- Nail Bakirov, 57, Russian statistician, car accident.
- Edith Barney, 87, American baseball player.
- Midge Costanza, 77, American social and political activist, advisor to President Jimmy Carter, cancer.
- Alan King-Hamilton, 105, British judge.
- Lauretta Masiero, 82, Italian actress, Alzheimer's disease.
- Jiro Nagasawa, 78, Japanese Olympic swimmer and national coach, throat cancer.
- Wayne Patrick, 63, American football player (Buffalo Bills), kidney disease.
- Kaljo Põllu, 75, Estonian artist.
- Kanu Sanyal, 78, Indian revolutionary, Naxal leader, suicide by hanging.
- Alex Seith, 75, American politician.
- Sulaiman Daud, 77, Malaysian politician, minister (1981–1999), liver cancer.
- Blanche Thebom, 94, American mezzo-soprano, pneumonia.
- Fritz Wagnerberger, 72, German Olympic skier.
- James Williamson, 26, Australian mountain biker and journalist.
- Marva Wright, 62, American blues singer, complications from a stroke.

=== 24 ===
- Elijah Alexander, 39, American football player (Indianapolis Colts), multiple myeloma.
- Anzor Astemirov, 33, Russian insurgent, leader of the 2005 Nalchik raid, shot.
- Robert Culp, 79, American actor (I Spy, The Greatest American Hero, The Pelican Brief), heart attack.
- Martin Elliott, 63, British photographer (Tennis Girl), cancer.
- Oswaldo Frota-Pessoa, 93, Brazilian geneticist and academic.
- Ron Hamence, 94, Australian cricketer.
- Colleen Kay Hutchins, 83, American actress, Miss America (1952), mother of Kiki Vandeweghe.
- Jim Marshall, 74, American photographer.
- William Mayne, 82, British children's author.
- Harold McGraw Jr., 92, American businessman, CEO of McGraw-Hill (1975–1983).
- Daphne Park, Baroness Park of Monmouth, 88, British spy (MI6), after long illness.
- Mortimer Sackler, 93, American physician and philanthropist.
- Eric Sunderland, 80, Welsh anthropologist and academic administrator, Vice Chancellor of Bangor University (1984–1995).

=== 25 ===
- Alberto Arroyo, 94, American runner.
- Pål Bang-Hansen, 72, Norwegian film director, actor and film critic, skin cancer.
- Ben Gascoigne, 94, New Zealand-born Australian optical astronomer.
- Kit Horn, 80, American surfer, non-Hodgkin's lymphoma.
- Des Hoysted, 87, Australian radio broadcaster and horse racing commentator.
- Marty Lederhandler, 92, American photographer (Associated Press), stroke.
- John P. McGarr, 45, American actor and film producer, traffic accident.
- Elisabeth Noelle-Neumann, 93, German political scientist.
- José Antonio Peteiro Freire, 73, Moroccan Roman Catholic prelate, archbishop of Tanger (1983–2005).
- Marshall Plummer, 62, American first Vice President of the Navajo Nation (1991–1994), lung disease.
- Martin Řehák, 76, Czech Olympic athlete.
- Michael S. Rosenfeld, 75, American talent agent, co-founder of Creative Artists Agency.
- Robert Sandager, 95, American Olympic shooter.
- Chet Simmons, 81, American sports broadcasting executive, first president of ESPN, Commissioner (USFL), natural causes.
- Václav Syrový, 75, Czech Olympic weightlifter.
- Zainal Abidin Ahmad, 71, Malaysian politician, brain cancer.
- Zhang Tingfa, 91, Chinese general, commander of the PLA Air Force.
- Kyohei Ushio, 75, Japanese Olympic sprinter.

=== 26 ===
- Ahmed bin Zayed Al Nahyan, 41, Emirati managing director of the Abu Dhabi Investment Authority, glider crash.
- Abeywardena Balasuriya, 63, Sri Lankan musician, playback singer, writer and a television program producer.
- Frank Burgess, 75, American federal judge and basketball player, cancer.
- Lara Jones, 34, British children's author and illustrator, melanoma.
- Manuel de Jesús Juárez, 55, Honduran journalist, shot.
- Shmuel Katz, 83, Israeli caricaturist and illustrator.
- Ruy Kopper, 79, Brazilian Olympic rower.
- Kwon Hyi-ro, 81, Japanese-born Korean murderer, prostate cancer.
- Heinz Laufer, 84, German Olympic athlete.
- José Bayardo Mairena Ramírez, 52, Honduran journalist, shot.
- Rocco Pantaleo, 53, Italian-born Australian owner of La Porchetta, motorcycle accident.
- Charles Ryskamp, 81, American art collector and museum director (Frick Collection, Pierpont Morgan Library), cancer.
- George X. Schwartz, 96, American politician.
- Max Whitehead, 87, Australian rugby league player, model and professional wrestler, complications following a hip operation.

=== 27 ===
- Dick Giordano, 77, American comic book artist and editor (Batman, Wonder Woman, Thor), complications from pneumonia.
- Zbigniew Gut, 60, Polish footballer.
- Peter Herbolzheimer, 74, German jazz musician.
- Stephen Hearst, 90, Austrian-born British television and radio executive.
- Colm Kiernan, 78, Australian historian, biographer of Irish Australians.
- Eva Markvoort, 25, Canadian blogger and subject of 65_Redroses, cystic fibrosis.
- Stanford Parris, 80, American politician, Representative from Virginia (1973–1975, 1981–1991), heart disease.
- Vasily Smyslov, 89, Russian chess grandmaster, World Champion (1957–1958), heart failure.
- Stanley Vann, 100, British organist and composer, complications following a fall.

=== 28 ===
- Fred Ascani, 92, American Air Force test pilot, lung cancer.
- David Carnegie, 14th Earl of Northesk, 55, Scottish peer, member of the House of Lords.
- Preeda Chullamondhol, 64, Thai Olympic cyclist.
- Sir Gaven Donne, 95, New Zealand jurist, former Chief Justice of various Pacific nations.
- Dan Duncan, 77, American businessman oil company executive and billionaire, cerebral hemorrhage.
- Herb Ellis, 88, American jazz guitarist, Alzheimer's disease.
- Derlis Florentín, 26, Paraguayan football player, car accident.
- Joe Gates, 55, American baseball player (Chicago White Sox) and coach (Gary SouthShore RailCats), heart failure.
- June Havoc, 97, Canadian-born American actress, natural causes.
- Ali Ibrahim, 38, Egyptian Olympic rower, traffic collision.
- Johnny Lawrenson, 88, British rugby league player.
- John Purdin, 67, American baseball player.
- Agim Qirjaqi, 59, Albanian actor and television director.
- Zofia Romanowicz, 87, Polish writer and translator.
- Asbjørn Sjøthun, 82, Norwegian politician, Mayor of Balsfjord Municipality (1962–1969), MP (1969–1989).
- Eric Tunney, 45, Canadian comedian (Kids in the Hall: Brain Candy).

=== 29 ===
- Tom Burton, 48, American professional wrestler.
- Choi Jin-young, 39, South Korean actor and singer, brother of Choi Jin-sil, suicide by hanging.
- Jean Cosmat, 99, French Olympic bronze medal-winning (1936) rower.
- Kurt Hockerup, 65, Danish politician, cardiac arrest.
- Alan Isler, 75, British-born American novelist and professor, after long illness.
- János Kass, 82, Hungarian artist.
- Jenne Langhout, 91, Dutch Olympic field hockey player.
- Sam Menning, 85, American actor (The Prestige), emphysema.
- Armando Nogueira, 83, Brazilian sports journalist.
- Elliot Willensky, 66, American songwriter, stroke.

=== 30 ===
- Franklin DeWayne Alix, 34, American serial killer, execution by lethal injection.
- Thomas Angove, 92, Australian winemaker, inventor of the wine cask.
- Laszlo Antal, 73, Hungarian born English sport shooter.
- Nicola Arigliano, 86, Italian jazz singer, musician, and actor.
- John Bunch, 88, American jazz pianist, melanoma.
- Juan Carlos Caballero Vega, 109, Mexican revolutionary, driver of Pancho Villa.
- Jaime Escalante, 79, American mathematics teacher, inspiration for film Stand and Deliver, bladder cancer.
- John Fethers, 80, Australian Olympic fencer (1952).
- Peter Flinsch, 89, German-born Canadian artist.
- Josef Homeyer, 80, German Roman Catholic prelate, bishop of Hildesheim (1983–2004).
- Morris R. Jeppson, 87, American Army Air Corps officer, assistant weaponeer on the Enola Gay.
- David Mills, 48, American author, journalist and television writer (NYPD Blue, ER, The Wire), brain aneurysm.
- Malcolm Poindexter, 84, American journalist and reporter (KYW-TV), Alzheimer's disease.
- Martin Sandberger, 98, German Nazi leader and Holocaust perpetrator.
- Harriet Shetler, 92, American journalist and advocate, a founder of the National Alliance on Mental Illness.
- William T. Smith, 94, American politician, Member of the New York Senate (1963–1987).
- H. Clyde Wilson Jr., 83, American anthropologist and politician.
- Jadin Wong, 96, American dancer, comedian and talent agent.

=== 31 ===
- Eugene Allen, 90, American White House butler (1952–1986), renal failure.
- Marcelle Arnold, 92, French actress.
- Arlette Franco, 70, French politician, complications from brain tumor.
- Burton Joseph, 79, American First Amendment lawyer, brain cancer.
- Tina Leung, 65, Hong Kong actress.
- Ludwig Martin, 100, German lawyer, Attorney General of Germany (1963–1974).
- Shirley Mills, 83, American actress (The Grapes of Wrath), pneumonia.
- Jerald terHorst, 87, American White House Press Secretary (1974), heart failure.
- Qasim Mahmood, 81, Pakistani intellectual and foremost encyclopedist, heart failure.
