= List of journalists killed in Honduras =

Places in Honduras where journalists have been killed.

This is a list of journalists killed in Honduras.

== 1983 ==
- Dial Torgerson, American war correspondent of Los Angeles Times - 21 June 1983 in Trojes, El Paraíso.

== 2001 ==
- Aristides Soto, Televicentro sports commentator - 5 October 2001 in San Pedro Sula.

== 2003 ==
- Germán Antonio Rivas, Mayavisión Canal 7 news anchor - 26 November 2003 in Santa Rosa de Copán

== 2007 ==
- Carlos Salgado, Radio Cadena Voces, Host - 18 October 2007 in Tegucigalpa (capital), Francisco Morazán

== 2009 ==
- Rafael Munguia, Radio Cadena Voces reporter - 1 April 2009 in San Pedro Sula
- Gabriel Fino Noriega, Estelar Radio - 3 July 2009 in San Juan Pueblo
- Bernardo Rivera Paz - kidnapped on 14 March 2009 in San Pedro Sula and founded dead on 9 July in Florida, Copán.

== 2010 ==
- Nicolás Asfura - 17 February 2010
- Joseph Hernández Ochoa, TV Channel 51, TV host - 1 March 2010 in Tegucigalpa (capital), Francisco Morazán
- David Meza Montesinos, TV Channel 45, Radio El Patio, Radio America - 11 March 2010 in La Ceiba, Atlántida
- Nahúm Elí Palacios Arteaga, TV Channel 5, television presenter - 14 March 2010 in Tocoa, Colón
- José Bayardo Mairena Ramírez, Excélsior and Manuel de Jesús Juárez, Radio Super 10–26 March 2010 in Juticalpa, Olancho
- Luis Antonio Chavez - 13 April 2010
- Jorge Alberto (Georgino) Orellana, Televisión de Honduras, TV host - 20 April 2010 in San Pedro Sula, Cortés
- Carlos Salinas - 8 May 2010
- Luis Arturo Mondragón, Channel 19, owner and TV presenter - 14 June 2010 in El Paraíso, El Paraíso
- Israel Zelaya Díaz, Radio Internacional - 24 August 2010 in San Pedro Sula, Cortés
- Henry Suazo, Radio HRN, Cablevisión del Atlántico - 28 December 2010 in La Masica, Atlántida

== 2011 ==
- Hector Francisco Medina Polanco, Omega Visión, TV host - 10 May 2011 in Morazán, Yoro
- Luis Mendoza Cerrato, Channel 24, owner - 19 May 2011 in Danlí, El Paraíso
- Nery Geremias Orellana, Radio Joconguera - 14 July 2011 in Candelaria, Lempira
- Adán Benítez - 4 July 2011
- Medardo Flores - 8 September 2011
- Luz Marina Paz Villalobos, Radio CHN-Cadena Hondureña de Noticias, radio show host - 6 December 2011 in Tegucigalpa (capital), Francisco Morazán

== 2012 ==
- Saira Fabiola Almendárez - 1 March 2012
- Fausto Evelio Hernández Arteaga, also called Fausto Elio Hernández - 11 March 2012
- Noel Alexander Valladares Escoto, Maya TV, TV presenter - 23 April 2012 in Tegucigalpa (capital), Francisco Morazán
- Erick Martínez Ávila, Kukulcán, public relations - Missing 5 May 2012 and found dead 7 May 2012 in Guasculile, north of the capital city
- Ángel Alfredo Villatoro, Radio HRN - Abducted 9 May 2012 & discovered dead on 15 May 2012 in Tegucigalpa (capital), Francisco Morazán
- Adonis Felipe Bueso Gutiérrez, Radio Stereo Naranja - 8 July 2012 in Villanueva, Cortés
- José Noel Canales Lagos, Hondudiario, online journalist - 10 August 2012 in Tegucigalpa (capital), Francisco Morazán

== 2013 ==
- Aníbal Barrow, anchorman for Globo TV, kidnapped by gunmen in San Pedro Sula - 26 June 2013. Found dead on 9 July 2013.
- Juan Carlos Argeñal, Radio Globo correspondent, shot in his house - December 2013.

== 2014 ==
- Hernán Cruz Barnica, 28 May 2014
- Herlyn Espinal, journalist and reporter of Televicentro's newscast Hoy Mismo, disappeared on 19 July 2014, found dead on 21 July 2014.
- Nery Soto, anchor of Canal 23, Olanchito, shot on 14 August 2014.
- Reynaldo Paz Mayes, shot on 15 December 2014 near Comayagua.

== 2017 ==
- Edwin Rivera Paz, 9 July 2017

== See also ==
- Human rights in Honduras
- List of journalists killed in Guatemala
- List of journalists killed in Mexico
- List of journalists killed in Venezuela
