= Censorship in Honduras =

Freedom of the press in Honduras began with the government of Francisco Morazán as president of the Federal Republic of Central America in 1830, when he enacted the liberal reforms that included reforms to education, freedom of the press, and freedom of religion.

Despite Honduras having had freedom of the press since its forming as the Republic of Honduras, censorship has presented itself in shape of the elimination of different ideologies such as liberalism and communism, with book burnings in libraries (such as the burning of the library of Dionisio of Herrera) and more recently with the murder of members of the press, lawyers, judges, and other public figures.

== Freedom of the press ==
Freedom of the press has officially existed in Honduras since its independence. In regions such as the Bay Islands and La Mosquitia, it was reaffirmed during their reincorporation into the national territory during the presidency of José Santos Guardiola.

== Freedom of communication ==
In Honduras there is freedom of telecommunications. The majority of press and telecommunications organizations are private.

=== Freedom of information ===
In Honduras, a person is free to access and use information from databases, libraries, archives, and the internet.

Internet access and speech is not limited in Honduras. Internet access is unrestricted and uncensored.

== Literary censorship ==
During times of dictatorship and military governments, distribution of many books were prohibited, such as the novel Prisión Verde written by Ramón Amaya Amador.

== Censorship of journalists ==
Honduras occupies the 148th place on the Reporters Without Borders Press Freedom Index. They cite incumbent president Juan Orlando's vicious attacks on the media, as well as abusive judicial proceedings, threats levied against opposition press, and a Honduran law protecting "official secrets" as causes.

Reporters published a list of the 39 predators on freedom of the press, and in Latin American declared Miguel Facussé Barjum, a Honduran businessman, as one of them.

=== Censorship and attacks against La Prensa and the OPSA Group ===
On 15 June 1969, during the football game which sparked the Football War, the vice president of La Prensa, Manuel Gamero, was arrested on charges of espionage. He was later freed on 7 August. On 19 of September 1969, three months after the Football War, Captain Amilcar Zelaya Rodríguez was ordered to seize La Prensa. It was censored by military for 26 days before going back to publishing on 15 October 1969.

In 1981, a bomb exploded in the La Prensa headquarters, causing damage to the building. In 1986, another bomb was detonated in La Prensa's Tegucigalpa headquarters.

== Murders of journalists ==
In Honduras, journalists are often the victims of threats, murders, and contract killings. However, the culprits are rarely found, nor are they punished. Judges and lawyers are also often the victims of threats and murders, often as retribution on part of organized crime. The perpetrators go unpunished in 97 percent of cases.

Date	Journalist
26 November 2003	Germán Antonio Rivas
18 October 2007	Carlos Salgado
17 February 2010	Nicolás Asfura
1 March 2010.	Josep Hernández
11 March 2010	David Meza Matamoros
14 March 2010	Nahúm Palaces
26 March 2010	Manuel of Jesús Juárez
26 March 2010	Bayardo Ramírez
11 April 2010	Luis Chévez
8 May 2010	Carlos Saltworks
20 April 2010	Georgino Orellana
14 June 2010	Luis Mondragón
24 August 2010	Israel Zelaya
28 December 2010	Henry Suazo
19 March 2011	Luis Ernesto Mendoza
7 May 2012	Erick Martínez Ávila
11 May 2011	Héctor Medina
5 July 2011	Adán Benítez
13 July 2011	Nery Jeremías Orellana
8 September 2011	Medardo Flores
6 December 2011	Luz Marina Paz
1 March 2012	Saira Fabiola Almendárez
11 March 2012	Fausto Elio Hernández
23 April 2012	Noel Valladares Escoto
15 May 2012	Alfredo Villatoro
24 June 2013	Anibal Barrow
20 July 2014	Herlyn Spinal

== Censorship during the coup d'état of 2009 ==
Electrical power, phone lines, and international cable TV were cut during the 2009 coup d'état. Multiple television stations were taken off the air, and others broadcast no news. Public transportation was also suspended.

== Censorship in the militarized zone of Bajo Aguán ==
In 18 February 2013 the Committee of Families of Disappeared Detainees in Honduras informed Reporters Without Borders of the accusations made by the commander of the Joint Task Force Xatruch against various journalists, human rights activists, and representatives of social movements who reported about the events taking place in the militarized region of Bajo Aguán.

== Reforms to Law of Telecommunications of Honduras ==
In 2013 the Executive Branch submitted to Congress a document that intended to reform the Telecommunications Framework Law.

The Association of Journalists of Honduras has been against reform because they claim it would censor the media or filter content for the public to only be transmitted government-approved content. Julieta Castellanos, rector of UNAH, said the law would empower the state to restrict freedom of speech.

The journalist Elias Chahín, current president of the Association of Independent Radio and Television Broadcasters of Honduras and critical of the reform to the Telecommunications Law of Honduras, was beaten by three men May 5, 2013. He was threatened that he would be killed if he returned to speak.
