= Clodomiro =

Clodomiro is a given name. Notable people with the name include:

- Clodomiro Almeyda (1923–1997), Chilean lawyer, professor and politician
- Clodomiro Carranza (born 1982), Argentinian professional golfer
- Clodomiro Castilla (died 2010), Colombian journalist, editor and radio reporter
- Clodomiro Cortoni (1923–2000), Argentine cyclist
- Clodomiro Picado Twight (1887–1944), Costa Rican scientist working on snake venom and developing antivenins

== See also ==
- Pueblo Clodomiro Díaz, village and municipality in Chaco Province in northern Argentina
- Clodomiro Picado Research Institute, research center in Vázquez de Coronado, San José Province, Costa Rica
- Clodomiro Ledesma, village and municipality in Entre Ríos Province in north-eastern Argentina
