= Joe Hernandez =

Joe or Joseph Hernandez may refer to:

- Joe Hernandez (race caller), American race caller
- Joe Hernandez (American football), American football wide receiver
- Joey Hernandez, Cuban American boxer
- José Mariano Hernández (1786–1864), Salvadoran politician and military officer
- Joseph Marion Hernández (1788–1857), American politician, plantation owner, and soldier
- Joseph Hernández Ochoa (1983/4–2010), Honduran journalist and television presenter
- Joseph Franklin Hernandez, member of the New Mexico House of Representatives

== See also ==
- Joe Hernandez-Kolski, American actor, poet and comedian
- Joe Hernandez Stakes, an American Thoroughbred horse race
