= Werner Arnold =

Werner Arnold can refer to:

- Werner Arnold (cyclist) (1930–2005), Swiss cyclist
- Werner Arnold (weightlifter) (1931–2025), German weightlifter
