= Marcel Honorat Léon Agboton =

Beninese Roman Catholic archibishop (1941–2023)

His Excellency Marcel Honorat Léon Agboton
- Archbishop Emeritus of Cotonou
- Appointed: 5 March 2005
- Term ended: 21 August 2010
- Predecessor: Nestor Assogba
- Successor: Antoine Ganyé
- Previous posts: Bishop of Kandi (1994–2000); Bishop of Porto Novo (2000–2005)

Orders
- Ordination: 6 January 1966 by Noël Laurent Boucheix
- Consecration: 25 March 1995 by Bernardin Gantin

Personal details
- Born: 16 January 1941 Avrankou, French Dahomey, French West Africa
- Died: 14 September 2023 (aged 82)

Archbishop Marcel Honorat Léon Agboton (16 January 1941 – 14 September 2023) was a Beninese Roman Catholic archbishop, the Archbishop Emeritus of Cotonou.

== Biography ==
Agboton was ordained as a priest on 6 January 1966, shortly before his 25th birthday and worked for nearly thirty years in Porto-Novo. On 19 December 1994 he was appointed the first Bishop of Kandi, and on 25 March 1995 was consecrated bishop of that diocese. On 29 January 2000, he was appointed Bishop of Porto-Novo and installed on 18 June. Appointed on 5 March 2005, he was installed Archbishop of Cotonou on 2 April 2005, succeeding Nestor Assogba.

In May 2008, he received a telegram from Pope Benedict XVI on the death of Cardinal Bernardin Gantin. The telegram described Gantin as "an eminent son of Benin and Africa who won great respect within the universal Church". The Pope wrote "I ask God the Father, from Whom all mercy comes, to welcome into His light and peace this eminent son of Benin and of Africa who, universally esteemed, was animated by a profound apostolic spirit and by an exalted sense of the Church and her mission in the world."

His resignation was accepted by Pope Benedict XVI on Saturday 21 August 2010. Bishop Antoine Ganyé of the Roman Catholic Diocese of Dassa-Zoume was his successor as Metropolitan Archbishop of Cotonou.

Agboton died on 14 September 2023, aged 82.

Catholic Church titles
| Preceded by Nestor Assogba | Archbishop of Cotonou; 2005–2010 | Succeeded by Antoine Ganyé |
| Preceded by Vincent Mensah | Bishop of Porto Novo; 2000–2005 | Succeeded by René-Marie Ehuzu |
| Preceded by NA | Bishop of Kandi; 1994–2000 | Succeeded by Clet Feliho |
