= Pat Mulcahy =

Pat Mulcahy may refer to:

- Pat Mulcahy (Cork hurler) (born 1975), Irish hurler
- Pat Mulcahy (Limerick hurler) (1877–1963), Irish hurler

== See also ==
- Patricia Mulcahy, United States Army officer
