= Juan Carlos Argeñal =

Honduran journalist

Juan Carlos Argeñal Medina was a Honduran journalist who was assassinated in December 2013 at age 43 in the town of Danlí, Honduras. He was the third TV journalist killed in that country in 2013.

== Early life and background ==
Argeñal was a native of the neighbourhood of Los Almendros in the Jamastrán Valley in the municipality of Danlí. The municipality is located in the state of El Paraiso in the southeastern part of Honduras. His mother, who survived him, is named Idalia Medina.

== Career ==
After Argeñal's death it was reported that his media career had begun more than 20 years earlier, when he had started working as a cameraman and correspondent for the news report Más Noticias on Channel 12, a closed-circuit TV station. His work for Más Noticias involved investigations and broadcasts about both local and national events.

=== Radio y TV Globo ===
Argeñal was a local correspondent for both Radio Globo and Globo TV, part of the Globo media group. Globo had opposed the 2009 military coup that deposed President Manuel Zelaya, and after reporting critically on the aftermath of the coup, it was the target of multiple attacks and broadcasting disruptions. On 28 September 2009, Radio Globo was forced off the air after security forces raided its offices, and did not return to the air until 20 October. In 2010, Luis Galdámez Álvarez, a reporter for both Radio Globo and Globo TV, survived a murder attempt outside his home in Tegucigalpa. The two journalists murdered in Honduras in 2013 prior to Argeñal were both employees of the Globo media group. They were program director Anibal Barrow, who was kidnapped and killed on 24 June, and cameraman Manuel Murillo, who was murdered on 24 October.

=== Vida TV ===
Argeñal was also owner of Vida Television, a local Christian television station that broadcasts on channel 27 and is transmitted via the Honduvisión network.

=== Suprema ===
Argeñal also owned Suprema, a mobile disc jockey firm. As owner of this enterprise, Argeñal “took part in various social and religious activities.”

== Political activity ==
Argeñal was a prominent local supporter of the Liberty and Refoundation Party (Partido Libertad y Refundación LIBRE), generally known as Libre. His brother, Mario Argeñal, was coordinator of the organization that ran the unsuccessful presidential campaign for Libre's candidate, Xiomara Castro Zelaya, the wife of ousted President Zelaya, in November 2013.

== Memberships ==
Argeñal was a member of the group Hombres Cristianos de Negocios (Christian Businessmen).

== Death ==
On 7 December 2013, Argeñal was shot to death at his house in Danlí. The details of his murder varied from one report to another. His residence was variously described as being located in the Teodoro Rodas Valle suburb of Danlí and in the town's Los Maestros section. According to most accounts, Argeñal was shot inside his home, with authorities indicating that they believed he had been at home alone when the gunmen entered the house, although one account, by Reporters Without Borders, said he had been shot outside his home. Several accounts said that he had been killed at around 3 pm; one said that he was killed at about 6 pm; another said that the crime had “occurred between five and six in the afternoon” when Argeñal was preparing to leave for a party; yet another said that Argeñal's neighbours had heard gunshots “at the stroke of 2 pm.” Some sources, including Amnesty International, said there were two perpetrators, while others said there were three, with some reports adding that the three men had worn hoods. Some sources said that he had sustained two bullet wounds to the head, while others said that there were “two or more” bullet wounds.

One source said that he was 44 years old at the time of his death, but all other sources that gave his age listed it as 43.

Later on the day of his murder, Argeñal body was found in his home. According to one account, which was reportedly based on information provided by Argeñal's neighbors, his failure to show up for a 7 pm broadcast and to answer his phone led a colleague at Globo to go to his home. This colleague, who asked the media for anonymity, forced the door to Argeñal's home, found his bloody corpse, and alerted the police. The officers who replied to the summons were led by José Luis Flores Ordóñez, deputy chief of the local constabulary of the National Police. One report indicated that the news of Argeñal's death was communicated to the Globo program “El Noticiero Mi Nacion” by his friend Marco Antonio Moncada, also a resident of Danlí.

According to one source, the local coroner confirmed that Argeñal had died at about 7 pm as a result of two bullet wounds, one in the head and the other in the stomach. Flores said that burglary had been dismissed as a motive because nothing appeared to be missing from the scene of the crime.

Globo director David Romero Ellner told Agence France-Presse that Argeñal had been threatened previously “for revealing corruption at a local hospital in reports for Globo TV.” One source quoted Romero as saying that Argeñal had received “a series of death threats” because of these corruption reports. “While authorities believe his murder was commissioned and then carried out by hitmen,” reported the Argentina Independent, “it is not clear whether it was in retaliation for his revelation of corruption, his support of the Libre party, or both.”

On the same day as Argeñal's murder, Libre politician Graciela Lozano, a recent mayoral candidate in the municipality of Brus Laguna, was shot and killed. Authorities said that they were investigating possible political motivations, but that they believed Lozano's murder to be a case of armed robbery. The Honduran newspaper La Prensa reported that at least 37 media figures, including Argeñal, had been assassinated during the previous four years, and that none of these murders had been solved. According to Flores, these crimes were all “still under investigation.”

Rafael Bados Castellanos, president of the Danlí chapter of the Hondural Press Association (Asociación de Prensa Hondureña), said that whatever the motive of Argeñal's killers, “we are up in arms” over the crime.

=== Response of international organizations ===
After Argeñal's death, Amnesty International stated that he had “reported about corruption in local government” and that in July 2013 he had told the Committee of Relatives of the Detained and Disappeared in Honduras (Comité de Familiares de Detenidos Desaparecidos en Honduras, COFADEH), a human-rights group, that “he had been intimidated because of his work.” He had told COFADEH “that he had felt pressure from local authorities who summoned him twice concerning broadcasting permits.” He had “attended both meetings and...feared such requests had been provoked by his journalism.” Amnesty International said that a “full and impartial investigation” into Argeñal's murder was “urgently needed.”

Two days after Argeñal's body was found, the committee to Protect Journalists, which had previously “found a pattern of botched and negligent investigative work into the killings” of other Honduran journalists, called on Honduran authorities to launch a full investigation into the murder, to identify a motive, and to bring the perpetrators to justice. “We call on Honduran authorities to fully investigate this murder, including a motive related to journalism, and bring those responsible to justice,” said Carlos Lauría, CPJ's senior Americas program coordinator. “As Honduras faces political tension resulting from the November presidential elections and prepares for a new administration, authorities must ensure that journalists can report the news and without the violent reprisals they faced after the events of 2009.”

After Argeñal's murder, Reporters Without Borders (RWB) noted that “Globo is one of the few national broadcasters to criticize the June 2009 coup d'état” and that its employees “have paid a high price for this for the past four years,” including “military occupation of their premises, confiscation of their equipment and targeted murders. The mere fact of working for Globo exposed Argeñal to danger.” The group suggested that Argeñal's murder “could also be linked to his well-known support for Liberty and Refoundation.” Citing the murders of 38 Honduran journalists in the previous decade, RWB commented: “Given the almost complete collapse of the rule of law, will this latest murder remain unpunished like nearly all the others? Does it signal the start of a new crackdown at a time when the country's future seems more uncertain than ever?” RWB added: “We fear the worst, and we regret the international community's inadequate response to this disaster. The priority right now is that authorities investigate this new crime.”

== Funeral ==
Argeñal's funeral took place at the Church of the Immaculate Conception (el templo Inmaculada Concepción) in Danlí. The mass was celebrated by Fr. German Flores. Argeñal's brother Mario remembered him as “an incredible person, full of good feeling and gift of service.

== See also ==
- List of journalists killed in Honduras
