= Weightlifting at the 1960 Summer Olympics – Men's +90 kg =

Weightlifting at the Olympics

Men's +90 kg at the Games of the XVII Olympiad
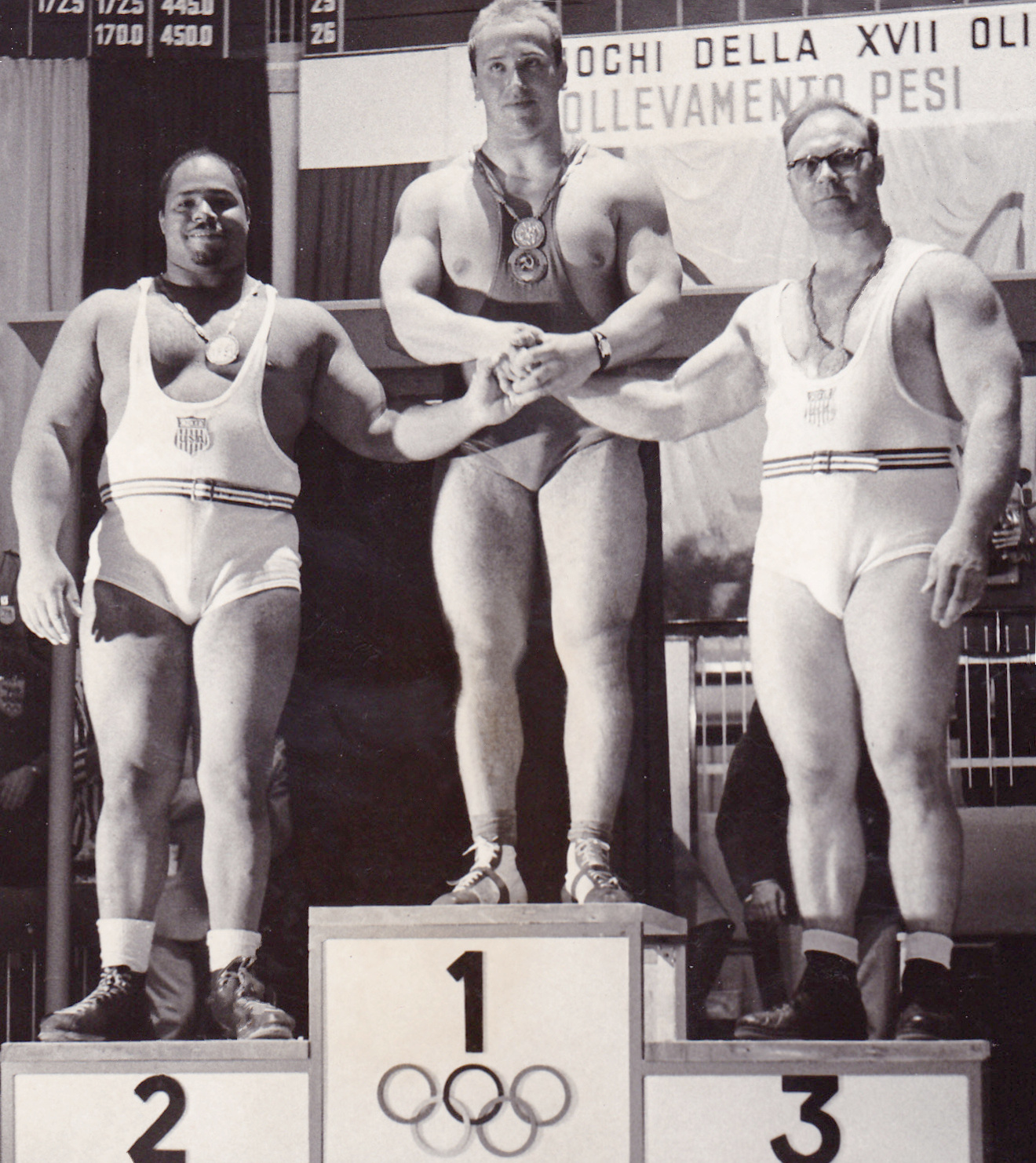
- Medal winners
- Venue: Palazzetto dello Sport
- Date: 10 September 1960
- Competitors: 18 from 15 nations
- Winning total: 537.5 kg WR

Medalists
1st place, gold medalist(s)		Yury Vlasov	Soviet Union
2nd place, silver medalist(s)		James Bradford	United States
3rd place, bronze medalist(s)		Norbert Schemansky	United States

The men's +90 kg weightlifting competitions at the 1960 Summer Olympics in Rome took place on 10 September at the Palazzetto dello Sport. It was the ninth appearance of the heavyweight class.

== Results ==
Rank	Name	Country	kg
1	Yury Vlasov	Soviet Union	537.5
2	James Bradford	United States	512.5
3	Norbert Schemansky	United States	500.0
4	Mohamed Mahmoud Ibrahim	United Arab Republic	455.0
5	Eino Mäkinen	Finland	455.0
6	Dave Baillie	Canada	450.0
7	Alberto Pigaiani	Italy	450.0
8	Václav Syrový	Czechoslovakia	445.0
9	Arthur Shannos	Australia	435.0
10	Hadi Abdul Jabbar	Iraq	432.5
11	Cornel Wilczek	Australia	430.0
12	Werner Arnold	United Team of Germany	425.0
13	Don Oliver	New Zealand	425.0
14	William Swaluk	Canada	412.5
15	Dennis Hillman	Great Britain	402.5
16	Henri Mersch	Luxembourg	340.0
AC	Ivan Veselinov	Bulgaria	270.0
AC	Bèto Adriana	Netherlands Antilles	277.5
