= Ángela Valle =

Honduran writer, journalist, and essayist

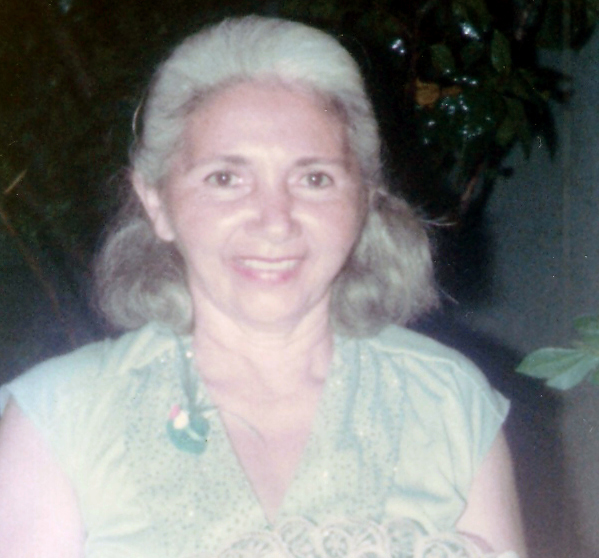
Ángela Valle

Ángela Valle (née Etna María de los Ángeles Valle Cerrato; January 7, 1927 - May 9, 2003) was a Honduran writer, journalist, and essayist. In 1967, she was awarded the first prize "Premio Nacional de Poesía Juan Ramón Molina".

== Biography ==
Etna María de los Ángeles Valle Cerrato was born in Comayagüela, January 7, 1927. Her parents were Bernardo Valle Hernández and Ana Leonor Cerrato Salgado. In her youth, in honor of her paternal grandmother, Ángela Hernández, she adopted the pseudonym of Ángela Valle.

Valle worked as a journalist in Honduras for various newspapers, including El Día, El Cronista, and La Prensa. As a poet, she composed in a traditional way, using the sonnet or long and rhymed poems, but also using modern forms of free verse. Her work has been incorporated into various anthologies of literature such as Poesía hondureña del siglo XX by Claude Couffon, 1997. She died in Tegucigalpa, May 9, 2003.

== Awards ==
- 1967, first prize, Premio Nacional de Poesía Juan Ramón Molina

== Selected works ==
- Arpegios
- Azahares
- Inicial
- La celda impropia
- Las flores de mayo
- Lúnulas (Premio Nacional de Poesía Juan Ramón Molina)
- Más allá de la cruz
- Nombre para un soneto
- Pajarera de luz
- Plaqueta de la ausencia
- Sirte
