= William Swaluk =

Canadian weightlifter

Personal information
- Born: 18 June 1938 (age 88) Fort William, Ontario, Canada

Sport
- Sport: Weightlifting

William Swaluk (born 18 June 1938) is a Canadian weightlifter. He competed in the men's heavyweight event at the 1960 Summer Olympics.
