= Medardo Flores =

- Born: ca. 1949; Honduras
- Died: September 8, 2011; Puerto Cortés, Cortés Department, Honduras
- Cause of death: Murdered by gunman
- Education: School of Broadcasters of the Institute of Communication Science of Radio Uno
- Occupation: Radio journalist
- Years active: 1 year
- Employer: Radio Uno
- Known for: Sociopolitical and cultural analysis
- Political party: National Popular Resistance Front (FNRP)

Medardo Flores (c. 1949 – September 8, 2011), a radio journalist for Radio Uno in San Pedro Sula, was murdered in an ambush near his home in Puerto Cortes, Cortés Department, Honduras. A popular radio journalist, he was a supporter of former President Manuel Zelaya Rosales and joins other journalists killed since Zelaya was overthrown in the 2009 Honduran coup d'état.

== Personal ==
Medardo Flores, who was 62 years old when he was murdered, lived on his farm near Puerto Cortes, where according to The Tico Times, he was a farmer and rancher. During the 1980s, he lived in exile because of conflicts against leftists in Honduras. He later returned, purchasing land and focusing on agriculture.

== Career ==
Medardo Flores was a farmer and rancher who was politically involved with grass roots political activism.

Flores was also a volunteer reporter for School of Broadcasters of the Institute of Communication Science of Radio Uno, an educational institution in San Pedro Sula, and a radio journalist for Radio UNO collective that analyzes current sociopolitical and cultural issues in the country.

Flores was a member of Zelaya's National Popular Resistance Front, a political and social movement that former-President Manuel Zelaya Rosales of the FNRP funded, and he served as its northern regional finance manager.

He was president of the Asociación de Padres de Familia del Instituto de Locución Primero de Diciembre.

== Death ==
Honduras map
Flores was murdered in Puerto Cortes 190 miles north of Tegucigalpa, the capital of Honduras.

On September 8, 2011, Medardo Flores was shot dead when he drove between his farm and the city through the sector known as the Río Blanquito neighborhood in the community of Bijao, Puerto Cortés and into an ambush. His car was sprayed with bullets from all directions but there were at least two perpetrators in the armed attack. He sustained 9 gunshot wounds in the attack.

== Context ==
At the time Flores was murdered, Honduras was in the process of seeking readmission into the Organization of American States, and press freedom analysts from Reporters Without Borders (RSF) thought that such civil rights violations would complicate the path set out in the Cartagena accords. Chicago Religious Leadership Network on Latin America has listed 59 political murders that took place in Honduras in 2011.

== Impact ==
Medardo Flores was the fifth journalist killed in 2011. He was the 15th or 16th journalist murdered from early 2010 through September 2011 after the U.S. led coup that ousted President Manuel Zelaya and sent him into exile. According to the Human Rights Commission, 23 journalists have been killed in Honduras since 2007.

The official investigations of these crimes have not aided in the determination of a motive, leading the chairman of the IAPA's Committee on Freedom of the Press and Information Robert Rivard to strongly urge authorities to solve and punish those responsible for the murders on journalists since 2007.

== Reactions ==
Irina Bokova, director-general of UNESCO, said, "I condemn the murder of Medardo Flores. The number of journalists killed in Honduras over the last two years is very worrying. These crimes must be investigated and their perpetrators must be brought to justice for the sake of freedom of expression, a fundamental human right, and press foundations of democracy and rule of law. We must make sure that freedom of expression thrives".

The OAS said, "The Office of the Special Rapporteur urges the State to conduct a prompt, diligent and thorough investigation which gives special attention to the possibility that the crime was connected to the victim’s journalistic and political activities."

A statement from RSF said, "It will be very hard for the authorities to rule out the possibility that Flores was killed for political reasons or because of his work as a journalist."

== See also ==
- List of journalists killed in Honduras
- Human rights in Honduras
- 2011 in Honduras
