= Ángel Alfredo Villatoro =

Honduran journalist and radio personality

Ángel Alfredo Villatoro Rivera (born 1965 in El Progreso, Yoro — d. 15 May 2012 in Tegucigalpa) was a Honduran journalist and radio personality, who was kidnapped and killed in 2012 and is regarded as a "journalist martyr". He was one of the seven journalists killed in Honduras in 2012.

== Early career ==
Villatoro started as radio operator in a local station in La Lima. In 1985 the radio personality Marco Antonio Pinto hired Villatoro to host a sports program in Radio Éxitos in San Pedro Sula. In 1986 Villatoro moved to Tegucigalpa to study journalism at Universidad Nacional Autónoma de Honduras. Later he became the host of a sports program in Radio Universal. His outstanding talent helped him to become a news reporter in Radio América and press reporter in La Tribuna and El Heraldo.

== In HRN ==
Villatoro left Radio América during the early 1990s and later, the then Presidential candidate, Oswaldo Ramos Soto hired him to advise his political campaign. In 1993 Raúl Valladares, the director of the radio station HRN hired him as assistant in the breakfast news program Diario Matutino. Months later the journalist Juan Carlos Barahona joined the program. In 2006 Valladares left HRN, Villatoro and Barahona were named news coordinators of the radio station.

== Kidnapping and death ==
On May 9, 2012, around 4:40 a.m., while driving to work, Villatoro was intercepted by a car in Colonia Tres Caminos and taken from his vehicle. On the morning of May 15, during a press conference, the President Porfirio Lobo stated that a series of videos were sent to Villatoro's family which prove that "he is alive". Around 8:00 p.m., an anonymous call to the National Police's communication center alerted that a body was found. The body was found clothed in a military uniform, however there was no confirmation that was Villatoro's body. At 9:40 p.m., during the live broadcast of Telenoticias, the Security Minister, Pompeyo Bonilla called Renato Alvarez to confirm that Alfredo Villatoro was found dead. Immediately the notice was widespread and several TV stations interrupted regular programming. The autopsy confirmed that Villatoro was killed that same day.

== Aftermath ==
Several organisations and journalists condemned the murder, the Organization of American States condemned the kidnapping. On May 25, the Honduran Journalists Day, a massive protest was convened by the Honduran Journalist Association.

== See also ==
- List of journalists killed in Honduras
