= Henri Mersch =

Luxembourgish weightlifter

Personal information
- Nationality: Luxembourgish
- Born: 4 October 1929; Rodange, Luxembourg
- Died: 26 July 1983 (aged 53); Differdange, Luxembourg

Sport
- Sport: Weightlifting

Henri Mersch (4 October 1929 – 26 July 1983) was a Luxembourgish weightlifter. He competed in the men's heavyweight event at the 1960 Summer Olympics.
