= Dennis Hillman (weightlifter) =

British weightlifter

Personal information
- Nationality: British
- Born: 6 April 1933 (age 91); Birmingham, England

Sport
- Sport: Weightlifting

Dennis Hillman (born 6 April 1933) is a British weightlifter. He competed in the men's heavyweight event at the 1960 Summer Olympics.
