= Aristide Gonsallo =

Beninese Roman Catholic bishop

- Church: Roman Catholic Church
- Diocese: Porto Novo
- Appointed: 2015
- Predecessor: René‑Marie Ehouzou

Orders
- Ordination: 2015

Personal details
- Born: September 4, 1966 Cotonou, Benin
- Denomination: Roman Catholic
- Education: Catholic University of the West, University of Angers
- Coat of arms

Aristide Gonsallo (born 4 September 1966) is a prelate of the Roman Catholic Church from Benin. Since 2015, he has been the Bishop of Porto Novo.

== Biography ==
Aristide Gonsallo was born in Cotonou, but grew up in Parakou, where he went to school before entering the seminary of the Archdiocese of Parakou. He was ordained a priest on 27 December 1992 in the same archdiocese.

He taught at the minor seminary of Parakou during three periods: from 1992 to 1997, 2001 to 2003, and 2004 to 2008. In between, Gonsallo pursued studies in theology and modern literature ("lettres modernes") in Angers, France. He obtained a doctorate in theology at the Catholic University of the West and a doctorate in modern literature at the University of Angers.

Upon his return to Benin in 2013, he served as parish priest of Saint-Martin in the village of Papané, and as chaplain at the diocesan hospital, where he was responsible for reorganising the diocesan health service.

In October 2015, he was appointed Bishop of Porto‑Novo by Pope Francis, succeeding the late René‑Marie Ehouzou and ending a period of sede vacante. Gonsallo was consecrated bishop on 19 December 2015 at Porto‑Novo's Cathedral of Our Lady, with the Apostolic Nuncio and other senior church leaders presiding. Among those present were President Thomas Boni Yayi and the President of the National Assembly, Adrien Houngbédji.

He is currently listed as the sitting bishop of Porto‑Novo, and also serves as Vice-President of the Episcopal Conference of Benin. He is also the President of Caritas Benin, the Catholic Church’s social welfare organisation.
