= Hernán Cruz Barnica =

Honduran journalist and activist

Hernán Cruz Barnica was a Honduran journalist and activist who hosted a radio program in San Juan de Opoa, in western Honduras. He was murdered on May 28, 2014.

== Career ==
Cruz lived and worked in San Juan de Opoa, where he was a taxi driver and justice of the peace. In 2009 co-founded a local social movement called Los Chuñas de Opoa (The Barefoot of Opoa). He was also a co-ordinator and member of the National Front of Popular Resistance (Frente Nacional de Resistencia Popular – FNRP) in Opoa, and a member of the FNRP's political wing, Libertad y Refundación (LIBRE).

In July 2013, he started a local radio station, Radio Opoa, la Voz de la Esperanza (the Voice of Hope), as a project of Los Chuñas de Opoa. Cruz hosted “Otro Nivel”, a daily radio program about human rights in Central America. The show “focused on investigating human rights abuses in the region,” according to one source. Cruz's program aired from 5:00 to 6:00 pm daily. It was transmitted on the 91.1 frequency under the auspices of the Instituto Ecuménico de Servicios a la Comunidad (INESCO), a community organization directed by a priest, Father Fausto Milla.

An obituary recalled that only a few weeks before his death, he had provided a local school, la Escuelita de Opoa, with a movie projector so that the children could be shown the Charlie Chaplin film The Great Dictator.

== Murder ==
He was murdered near the town of Dulce Nombre, in the department of Copán, on May 28, 2014. He was shot three times in the head. The killing was described as the work of “unidentified gunmen.” He was reportedly accosted in Santa Rosa de Copan and then taken up to Tierra Colorada, Dulce Nombre, and was killed there. A local source stated that he was last seen alive at around 4 pm in Santa Rosa de Copán, at which time an unidentified man contracted his services as a taxi driver. About an hour later, Cruz's dead body was found inside his taxi on a street in Dulce Nombre.

The night before he was killed, Cruz had reportedly spoken on his program about human rights issues and about threats he had recently received. He had reportedly picked up a passenger in his taxi shortly before he was found dead.

At the time of his death, Cruz was 52 years old and was no longer a justice of the peace.

“Here in the city there is dismay, no anxiety; a tremendous situation, we are humbled”, said Anarely Rodríguez, his friend and colleague at Radio Opoa, said after Cruz's death that the town was full of “dismay” and “distress.”

Camille Soulier, head of the Americas desk at Reporters without Borders, said, “We urge the authorities to do everything possible to identify those responsible for this horrible crime and bring them to trial.” She noted that Cruz's murder came less than two months after the killing of another Honduran journalist, Carlos Mejía Orellana of Radio Progreso. “Cruz’s murder,” Soulier said, “shows that the situation for journalists continues to be very dangerous in Honduras.” The Director-General of UNESCO, Irina Bokova, also denounced the killing of Cruz. “It is particularly poignant to see a journalist dedicated to the promotion of human rights pay with his life for exercising the basic human right of freedom of expression,” she said. “I call on the authorities to make sure that those responsible for this murder are brought to justice.”

He was reportedly the 43rd journalist to be killed in Honduras since 2003.

Cruz's death occurred two months after the murder of another Honduran journalist, Carlos Mejia Orellana, a contributor to Progressive Radio, and amidst threats on the life of Honduran journalist Alex Sabillón. Four days after his murder, moreover, yet another Honduran journalist, Óscar Anthony Torres Martínez, was killed. PEN International stated that the murder of the two journalists within four days underscored the urgency of the need for improved protection for media workers in Honduras. In a statement, PEN expressed alarm at “the continued climate of fear and persecution which Honduran journalists face on a daily basis” and called on Honduran authorities “to break once and for all the country’s legacy of impunity by expediting a full, impartial and independent investigation into these and all other journalist murders.” Marian Botsford Fraser, chair of PEN's Writers in Prison Committee, said that the two murders “go to show how much further the State of Honduras has to go to protect its journalists.”

== See also ==
- List of journalists killed in Honduras
