= Shirak State University =

Coordinates: 40°49′48″N 43°49′52″E

- Շիրակի պետական համալսարան
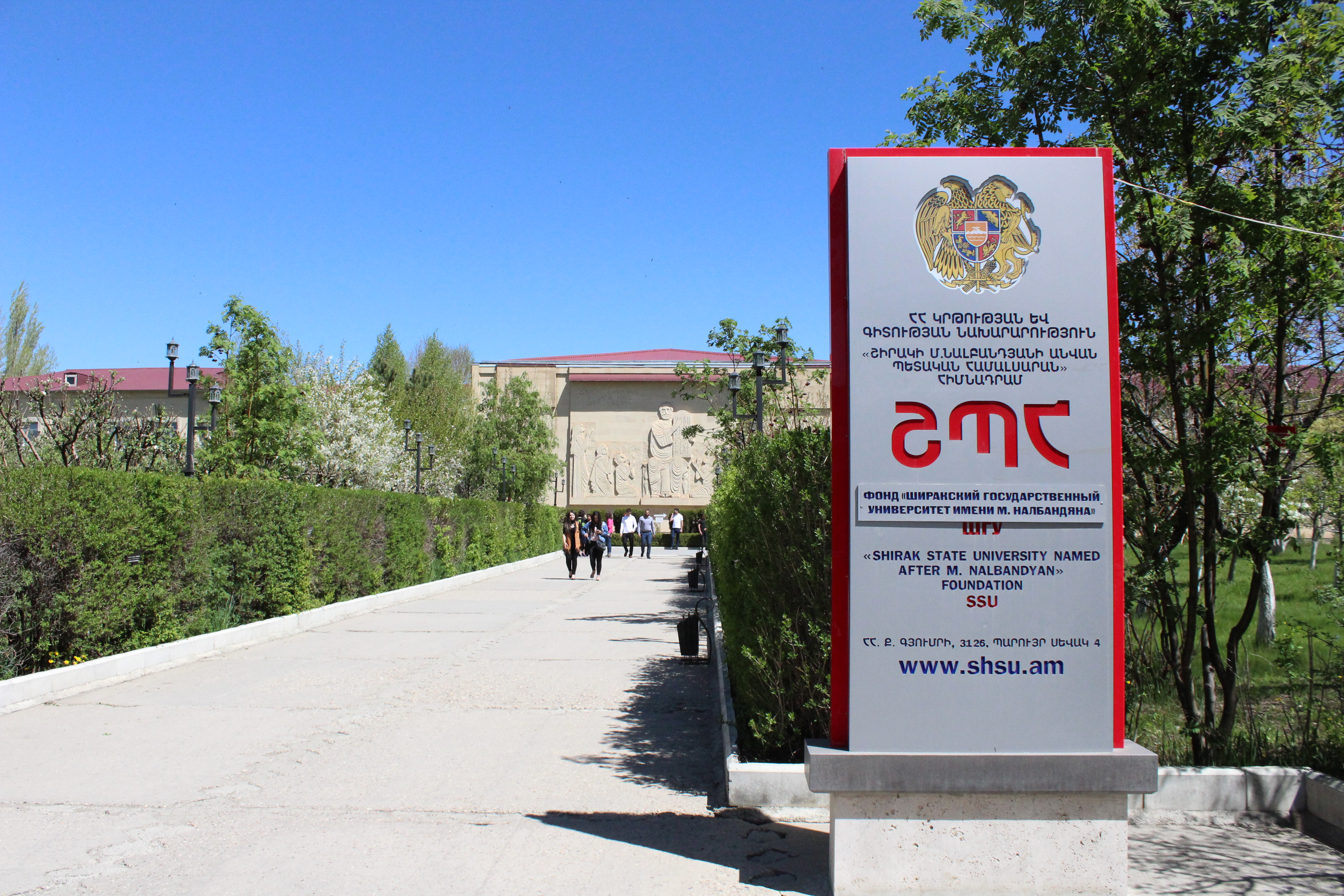
- Former name: Gyumri State Pedagogical Institute
- Type: Public
- Established: 1934; 92 years ago
- Rector: Yervand Serobyan
- Students: 6,000
- Location: Gyumri, Shirak, Armenia
- Campus: Urban
- Colours: Blue, Gold
- Website: shsu.am
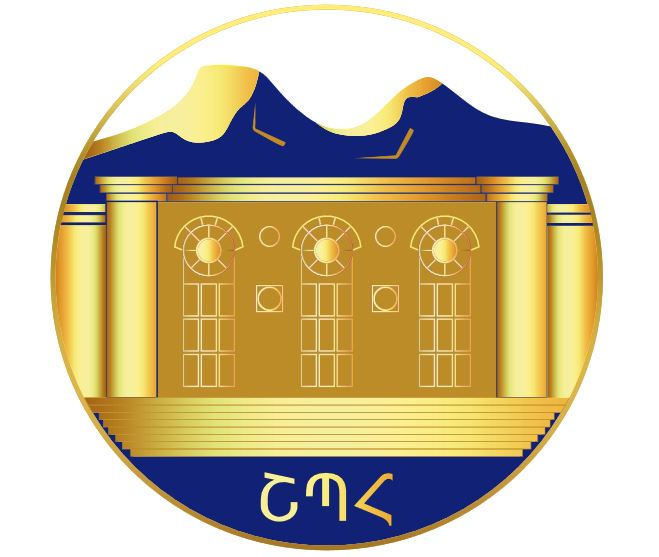

Shirak State University (Armenian: Շիրակի պետական համալսարան), also known as Shirak State University named after Mikayel Nalbandian (Armenian: Շիրակի Միքայել Նալբանդյանի անվան պետական համալսարան) is a public university in Gyumri, the capital of Shirak Province, Armenia, opened in 1934.

== Overview ==
Shirak State University is the largest educational institute in the northern part of Armenia. It was opened in 1934 as a pedagogical institute during the Soviet Union, through the efforts of S. Movsisyan.

In 2016, the institute was restructured to become the public university of the Shirak Province. It currently offers 28 bachelor's degrees as well 16 master's degrees. As of 2017, the university has around 6,000 students. It has produced around 80,000 graduates throughout its existence since 1934. In 2014, the university celebrated its 80th anniversary.

Shirak State University has its own emblem as well as an anthem written by Sonik Khachatryan and composed by Robert Amirkhanyan. The university complex is located on Paruyr Sevak Street of Ani district at the northwestern suburbs of Gyumri.

== History ==
Leninakan Pedagogical Institute was founded in 1934 as a branch of the Armenian State Pedagogical University. During the first year of admission, it engaged 16 lecturers and had around 100 students. The first rector was S. Movsisyan who enrolled teachers from Gyumri as well as specialists from the capital Yerevan. In 1949, the institute was named after Mikayel Nalbandian and functioned as a branch of the Armenian Pedagogical University until 1966, when it was given the status of an independent higher educational institution.

After the independence of Armenia in 1991, it became known as the Gyumri State Pedagogical Institute named after Mikayel Nalbandian.

On December 2, 2016, the institute was restructured and turned into a university foundation being known as Shirak State University named after Mikayel Nalbandian.

== Structure ==
A of 2017, Shirak State University is home to 7 faculties:

- Faculty of Physics, Mathematics and Economics
- Faculty of History and Philology
- Faculty of Biology and Geography
- Faculty of Foreign Languages
- Faculty of Pedagogy
- Faculty of Physical and Preliminary Military Training
- Faculty of Philosophy and Social sciences

== Notable alumni ==
- Susanna Amatuni, art critic
- Samvel Balasanyan, mayor of Gyumri
- Hovhannes Shiraz, notable Armenian poet
