= Ella Mae Johnson =

American writer

Ella Mae Cheeks Johnson (January 13, 1904 – March 22, 2010) was an American social worker, activist and author. She received national recognition in 2009 when, at 105 years old, she travelled to Washington D.C. to attend the inauguration of U.S. President Barack Obama.

== Early life ==
Johnson was born Ella Mae Smith on January 13, 1904, in Dallas, Texas. She never met her father, and she became an orphan when her mother died of tuberculosis when she was four years old. She was raised by her neighbors, the Davis family.

She was the salutatorian of her high school, Dallas Colored High School.

Johnson was able to attend college through several scholarships and a job as a waitress at a YMCA tearoom, enrolling at Fisk University in 1921. As a student, she attended a commencement speech by W. E. B. Du Bois. She received a bachelor's degree in French from Fisk University, though she graduated six months later than expected after participating in a semester boycott of the school led by Du Bois.

After graduation, Smith briefly moved to Raleigh, North Carolina, where she worked for the Congregational Church. In 1926, she relocated again to Cleveland, Ohio, to pursue her master's degree in social work at the Western Reserve University's School of Applied Social Science, which is now called Case Western Reserve University. Smith was one of just two African American students which were admitted to the school's social work graduate program each year.

== Personal life ==
She married her first husband, Elmer Cheeks, an electrical engineer with Cleveland Municipal Light, in 1929. The couple had two sons, Jim and Paul Cheeks, during their 12-year marriage, which ended in his death. She later married her second husband, Raymond Johnson, who worked as a probation officer at the Cleveland Municipal Court. She was also widowed from her second marriage.

== Career ==
Johnson worked for both the Cuyahoga County Department of Welfare and Associated Charities of Cleveland, in a program that merged with the Aid to Dependent Children, an American federal government program. Her job involved finding scholarships for low-income students and distributing financial payments to single mothers. Among the people she helped were Louise Stokes and her young sons, Carl Stokes and Louis Stokes. She retired in 1961 and began travelling, ultimately visiting more than 30 countries, including Egypt, Ethiopia, Ghana, Greece, Israel, Italy, Japan, Kenya, Mexico and Syria.

She moved to the Judson at University Circle, an assisted living facility, in Cleveland Heights, Ohio, in 1975.

=== Obama inauguration ===
Johnson gained national attention in 2009, when at the age of 105, she attended the inauguration of President Barack Obama in Washington D.C. Covered in a sleeping bag and heavy clothes to guard against cold temperatures, Johnson attended the inauguration with a ticket provided by Ohio U.S. Senator Sherrod Brown. In several interviews, Johnson said of President Obama, "I found him so interesting and brilliant" and predicted a future female American president: "God wouldn't give African-American men what he wouldn't give to the women."

== Death and autobiography ==
Johnson died at Judson Park in Cleveland, Ohio, on March 22, 2010, at the age of 106. She was survived by her sons, James Cheeks and Paul Cheeks; a stepson, D. Wright Johnson; five grandchildren and five great-grandchildren. She was the oldest living African American alumna of Case Western Reserve University at the time.

Johnson's autobiography, It Is Well with My Soul: The Extraordinary Life of a 106-Year-Old Woman, which she co-wrote with author Patricia Mulcahy, was published posthumously by Penguin Books. Johnson's 203-page memoir, which was originally scheduled to be released in May 2010, was moved up to a new release date of March 31, 2010, due to her death.
