= Hameeduddin Aquil Husami =

Indian Islamic scholar (1928–2010)

Hameeduddin Husami Aqil
- Born: 23 July 1928; Hyderabad, India
- Died: 12 March 2010 (aged 81); Hyderabad, India

Philosophical work
- Era: Modern era
- Region: India
- Main interests: Quranic studies, Islamic law

Hameeduddin Aquil Husami (23 July 1928 – 12 March 2010) was an Indian Islamic scholar. He was a member of the All India Muslim Personal Law Board. He was the founder head of Jamia Islamia Darul Uloom, Chairman of Deeni Madaris Federation and headed the United Muslim Forum, an Umbrella organisation for many Muslim organisations.

== Early life ==
Husami was born on 23 July 1928 in Hyderabad, India.

== Death ==
He died on 12 March 2010, was suffering from lung illness. His Namaz-e-Janaza was prayed at Makka Masjid, Hyderabad and was buried in Hussamia Chaman, an ancestral graveyard of his family.

Dr. K. Rosaiah, the former Chief Minister of Andhra Pradesh, Asaduddin Owaisi, President of All India Majlis-e-Ittehadul Muslimeen and N. Chandrababu Naidu visited the residence of Husami to pay tribute.
