= Marty Lederhandler =

American photojournalist

Martin Lederhandler (November 23, 1917 – March 25, 2010) was a photographer for the Associated Press for 66 years, making him the longest-serving AP staff member. During his career, he photographed every President of the United States "from Herbert Hoover to Bill Clinton".

Lederhandler began working with the Associated Press in 1936, and participated in D-Day as an official US Army photographer.

He retired in the wake of the terrorist attacks on September 11, 2001, saying they helped spur the decision. His photograph of the burning towers of the World Trade Center juxtaposed against the Empire State Building has been described as "iconic".

Lederhandler suffered a stroke on February 17, 2010. He died on March 25, 2010, at Hackensack University Medical Center in Hackensack, New Jersey.
