= Donald P. Kelly =

American businessman

- Born: Chicago, Illinois
- Died: March 18, 2010 (aged 88); Naples, Florida
- Occupations: Executive, Financier

Donald P. Kelly (February 24, 1922 – March 18, 2010) was a Chicago businessman, most well known for the 1987 leveraged buyout of the Beatrice Companies. He was the chairman of Kohlberg Kravis Roberts & Company, the firm that, along with Drexel Burnham Lambert, financed the acquisition of the Beatrice conglomerate for over $6 billion. The deal was one of the most profitable of the 1980s. Later in life he was the CEO of D.P. Kelly and Associates, and trustee of the Museum of Science and Industry.

== Early career ==
Kelly joined the U.S. Navy in 1942, during World War II. He served on a torpedo ship, where he boxed and established a reputation as a tough fighter. He never attended college, despite a sibling at Northwestern and another being a graduate of Loyola. After the war he worked for a number of companies in Chicago, finally becoming the chief executive of Esmark in 1977.

== Leveraged buyouts ==
Working for Esmark, Kelly oversaw the buyout of Norton Simon, and later tried to purchase Beatrice in 1984. Beatrice instead bought Esmark. Although the first Beatrice deal failed, Kohlberg, along with financing from Drexel, was able to acquire Beatrice in the late 1980s.

Kelly later oversaw the sale of the Beatrice divisions, becoming the CEO of one of the subsidiary companies.
