= Geoff Myburgh =

South African yachtsman

Geoffrey Vivian Myburgh
- Born: 30 December 1928; South Africa
- Died: 2 March 2010 (aged 81)
- Occupations: Olympian sailor; Sports official; Institutional governor
- Organization: National Sea Rescue Institute
- Awards: South African Sports Merit Award

Geoffrey Vivian Myburgh (30 December 1928 – 2 March 2010) was a South African Olympic sailor. He was one of the founders of the National Sea Rescue Institute, of which he became financial director, chairman, and life governor.

== Early life ==
Geoffrey Vivian Myburgh was born on 30 December 1928.

== Career ==
In 1947, Myburgh started his sailing career from Kalk Bay, South Africa on a Gaff Rig, named Spindrift, designed by Norman Ross of the Royal Cape Yacht Club.

In 1951, he began sailing dinghies at Zeekoe Vlei Yacht Club with a group of other sailors.

In 1952, Myburgh sailed for Royal Cape Yacht Club on a craft named Sea Swallow, and competed the 30 square metres event, in the Lipton Cup Challenge.

In 1956, he represented South Africa at the Olympic games in Melbourne, finishing at ninth place at the 5.5 metre event.

In 1958, Myburgh competed in the Flying Dutchman World Championship.

In 1971, he helped with the construction of the first 20 Optimists belonging to the Zeekoe Vlei Yacht Club.

In 1973, Myburgh introduced the Laser into South Africa; and participated in and won numerous Laser related competitions world wide.

In 1997, he received the South African Sports Merit Award for his work as a coach.

He became an ISAF international judge in 1982, a status that continued for the rest of his life, and travelled the world in this role. He was involved in the administration of various classes and was principal race officer and chairman of the organising committees for many major events, including Cork Week.

== Death ==
On 2 March 2010, Myburgh died at the age of 81.
