= Slavko Fras =

Slovenian journalist

Slavko Fras (June 15, 1928, Maribor – March 1, 2010, Ljubljana) was a Slovenian journalist from Ljubljana, Slovenia. He worked for the daily Delo and the Austrian press agency APA, as well as being the editor of the fortnightly Naši razgledi in the 1980s and 1990s.

== Career ==
In 1956, Fras graduated from comparative literature at the Faculty of Arts in Ljubljana . A year later, he became a permanent correspondent for the Human Rights newspapers, then Delo and Borbe in Vienna. After returning to his homeland, Fras worked in Del as a foreign policy commentator from 1961 to 1970, and then worked as an editor of Delo's Saturday annex. From 1970 to 1974 he was the first permanent correspondent for Delo and Borbo from Bonn in the Federal Republic of Germany. In 1987 and 1988 he was president of the Association of Journalists of Yugoslavia.

He was one of 571 Petition signatures against censorship and political pressures on journalists in Slovenia.

== Death ==
On March 1, 2010, Slavko Fras died at the age of 81.
