= René-Marie Ehuzu =

Beninese teacher and catholic bishop (1944–2012)

The Most Reverend René-Marie Ehuzu
- Bishop of Porto Novo
- Church: Congregation of Jesus and Mary
- Diocese: Diocese of Porto-Novo
- Appointed: 19 November 2002
- Predecessor: Nestor Assogba
- Successor: Aristide Gonsallo
- Previous post: Bishop of Abomey (2002-2003)

Orders
- Ordination: 30 September 1972
- Consecration: 6 January 2003 by Pope John Paul II
- Rank: Bishop

Personal details
- Born: 12 April 1944 Cotonou, Benin
- Died: 17 October 2012 (aged 68) Porto Novo, Benin
- Denomination: Roman Catholic

René-Marie Ehuzu, also spelled René-Marie Ehouzou (12 April 1944 – 17 October 2012) was the Roman Catholic bishop of the Roman Catholic Diocese of Porto Novo, Benin, from 2007 until his death in 2012.

He had previously been Bishop of Abomey in Benin from 2002.

Ordained as a priest in 1972, Ehuzu was named bishop in 2002; he was consecrated bishop by Pope John Paul II on 6 January 2003; he died while still in office.
