= Diocese of Porto-Novo =

Roman Catholic diocese in Benin

Coordinates: 6°28′19″N 2°37′09″E

Diocese of Porto-Novo Dioecesis Portus Novi
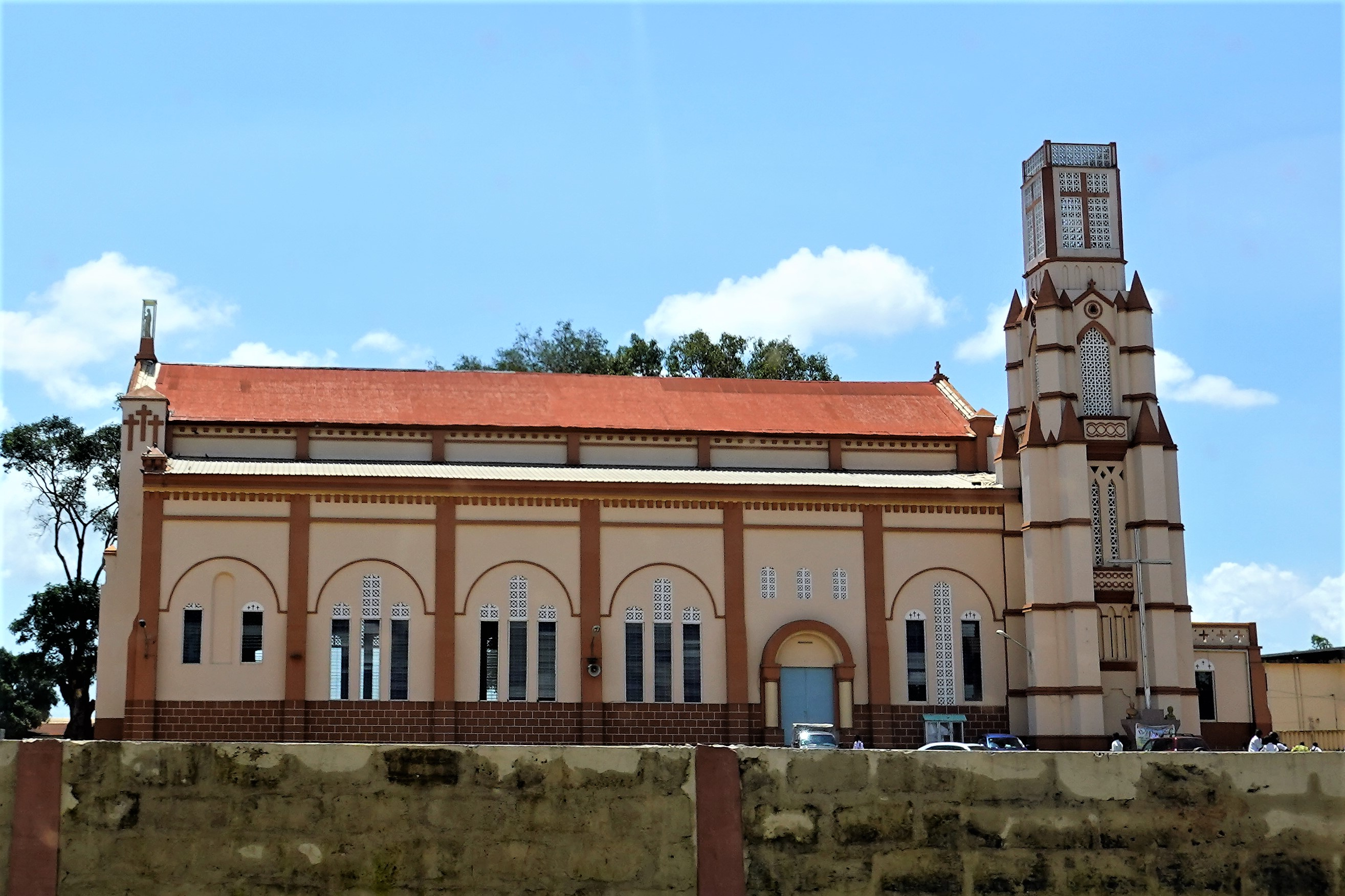
- Cathédrale Notre Dame de l'Immaculée Conception

Location
- Country: Benin
- Ecclesiastical region: Archdiocese of Cotonou
- Headquarters: Porto-Novo

Statistics
- Area: 4,545 km^{2} (1,755 sq mi)
- Population: Total; Catholics: (as of 2023); 2,015,130; 795,130 (39.5%)
- Parishes: 99

Information
- Denomination: Catholic Church
- Sui iuris church: Latin Church
- Rite: Roman Rite
- Established: 5 April 1954; 72 years ago
- Cathedral: Cathédrale Notre Dame de l’Immaculée Conception of Porto-Novo

Current leadership
- Pope: Leo XIV
- Bishop: Aristide Gonsallo
- Metropolitan Archbishop: Roger Houngbédji, OP

Map
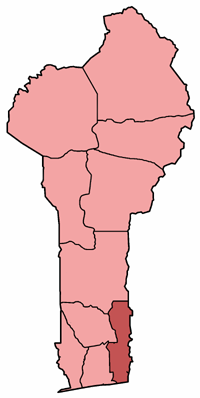
- Location of the Diocese of Porto-Novo within Benin

The Diocese of Porto-Novo (Latin: Dioecesis Portus Novi) is a Roman Catholic diocese located in the city of Porto-Novo in the ecclesiastical province of Cotonou in Benin.

Caritas Porto-Novo is the social arm of the diocese.

== History ==
- 5 April 1954: Established as Apostolic Vicariate of Porto-Novo from Apostolic Vicariate of Ouidah
- 14 September 1955: Promoted as Diocese of Porto-Novo

== Special churches ==
The Cathedral of the diocese is Cathédrale Notre Dame de l’Immaculée Conception in Porto-Novo.

== Leadership ==
- Bishops of Porto-Novo (Roman rite), in reverse chronological order
  - Bishop Aristide Gonsallo: 24 October 2015 – present
  - Bishop René-Marie Ehuzu, C.I.M.: 3 January 2007 – 17 October 2012
  - Bishop Marcel Honorat Léon Agboton: 29 January 2000 – 5 March 2005, appointed Archbishop of Cotonou
  - Bishop Vincent Mensah: 21 September 1970 – 29 January 2000
  - Bishop Noël Boucheix, S.M.A.: 6 July 1958 – 1 January 1969

== See also ==
- Roman Catholicism in Benin
