= Johnnie High =

American musician (1929–2010)

Johnnie High (May 1, 1929 – March 17, 2010) was a music impresario, starmaker, and performer of Texas who established Johnnie High's Country Music Revue, a live Saturday night show, in 1974 in Grapevine, Texas.

== Early life ==
High was raised in McGregor, Texas. He began learning music from an early age. He acquired a $6 guitar and when he was 13, hitchhiked to nearby Waco to audition for a radio show. In 1948, Johnnie married Wanda Davis in Waco when they were still teenagers. For many years, he worked at the radio station, singing and accompanying himself on guitar. He collected words to songs from the magazine Country Song Roundup, which published song lyrics. He couldn't read music nor did he need to. As with many other country musicians he played guitar by ear.

== Revue career ==
In 1974, High began his country music show, when he and dance teacher Chisai Childs of Fort Worth, bought and renovated Grapevine's Palace Theatre. In 1979, Childs moved to Branson, Missouri, when High opened his Saturday night show at Will Rogers Auditorium in Fort Worth. It stayed there for almost 13 years before moving to Haltom City's Shannon Auditorium.

In 1995, High bought an old movie theater in Arlington, Texas and created the Arlington Music Hall.

== Death ==
High enjoyed helping other people shine at his iconic Johnnie High's Country Music Revue for more than 30 years in his life. On March 17, 2010, he died from heart failure at the age of 80.
