= Susanna Amatuni =

- Սուսաննա Ամատունի
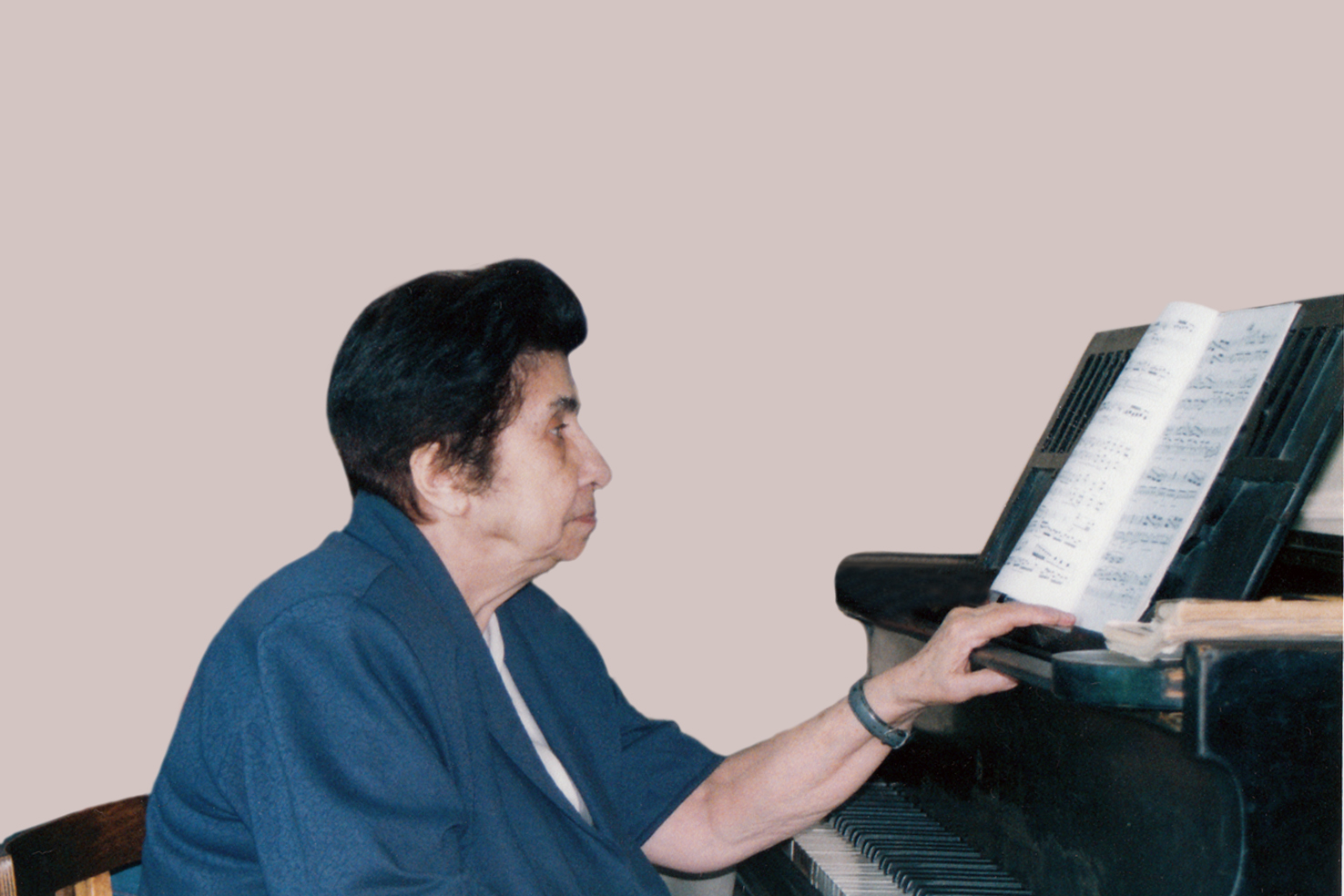
- Susanna Amatuni in 2000
- Born: Shushanik Babken Amatuni; 28 February 1924; Yerevan, SSR Armenia, Soviet Union
- Died: 20 March 2010 (aged 86); Yerevan, Armenia
- Resting place: Gyumri, Armenia
- Education: Gnesin Music and Pedagogy Institute
- Occupations: Musicologist, teacher, professor
- Years active: 1943–2010

Shushanik "Susanna" Babken Amatuni (Armenian: Սուսաննա "Շուշանիկ" Բաբկենի Ամատունի; 28 February 1924 – 20 March 2010) was a Soviet and Armenian art critic, musicologist, Dr. of Arts (1988), professor (1997), and Honored Teacher of the USSR (1966).

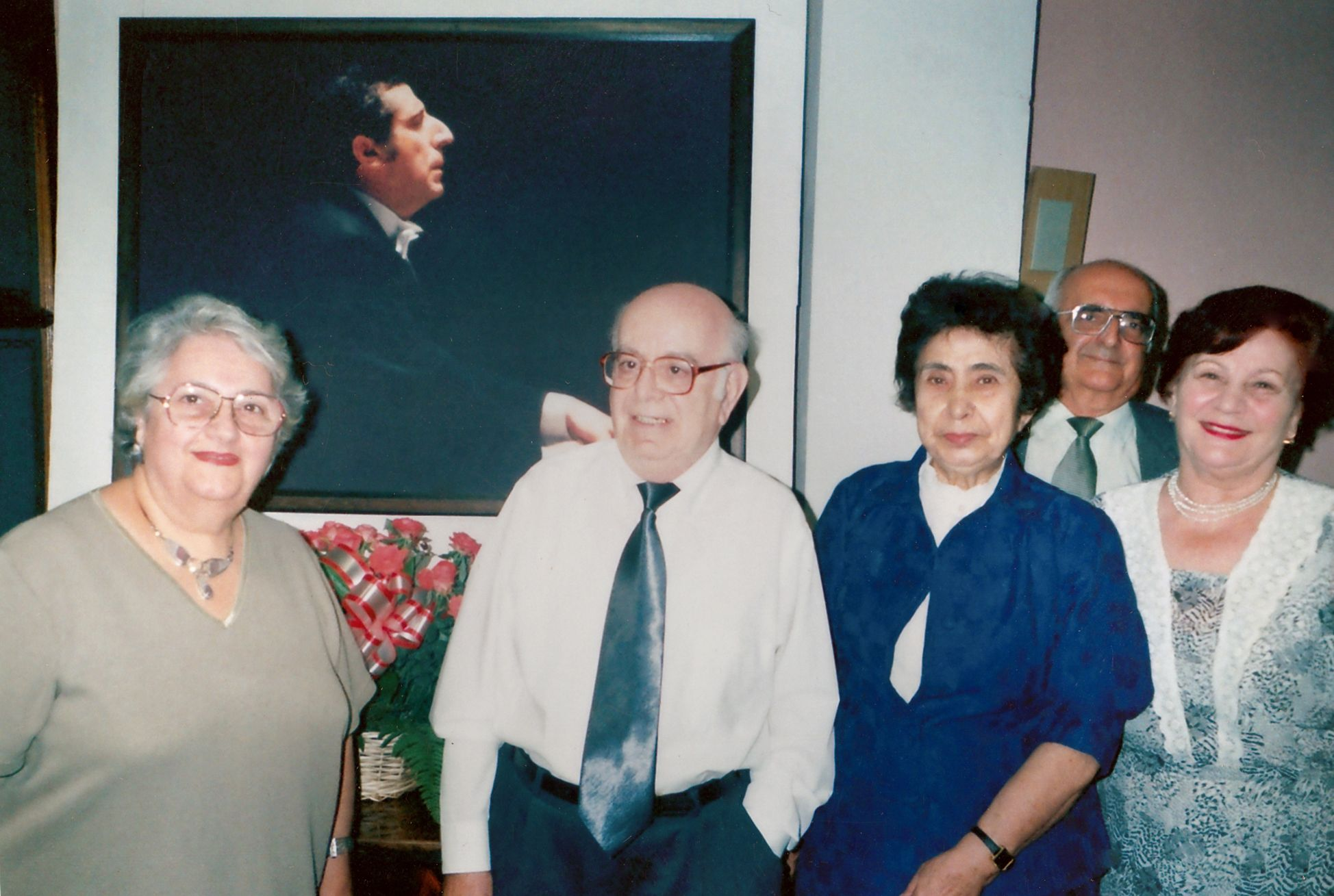
Amatuni with Geghuni Chitchyan et al.

== Biography ==
Shushanik Babken Amatuni was born in 1924 in Yerevan. In 1943 she graduated from Shirak State University in Leninakan, Physics and Math Department and in 1944 Kara-Murza Music College in Leninakan. She studied in Gnesin Music and Pedagogy Institute, Theory and Composition Department which was considered the hardest one there. In 1951 she returned to Armenia and until 1968 taught theoretical subjects at Chaikovsky Music School, Yerevan. In 1961 she was invited to teach in Komitas State Conservatory of Yerevan where she devised her own unique method and taught a special course of Music Analysis for the Theory Department. In addition to this subject S.B. Amatuni taught Piano Teaching Method and other courses. In 1988 she was honored Doctor of Arts for her monograph "Arno Babajanian. Instrumental Compositions".

== Works ==
Amatuni authored over 50 scientific articles. She participated in numerous scientific conferences in different cities of the USSR: Moscow, Leningrad, Tbilisi, Yerevan. She is the author of various works such as Arno Babajanian. Instrumental Works, Geghuni Chitchian's Life and Works (Yerevan, 2003), textbooks Music Literature for 6-th grade of Music School, Music Literature for 7-th grade of Music School (1st and 2nd edition), a series of brochures. Her scientific research includes analysis of melodic and stylistic peculiarities of works of Sayat-Nova, Komitas, Arno Babajanian, Anushavan Ter-Ghevondyan, Haro Stepanyan, Geghuni Chitchian and other composers.

== Sources ==
- Ով ով է. Հայեր. Կենսագրական հանրագիտարան, հատոր առաջին, Երևան, 2005.
