= Nail Bakirov =

Russian statistician (1952–2010)

Nail K. Bakirov
- Born: 30 March 1952; Karaganda (Kazakhstan)
- Died: 23 March 2010 (aged 57); Ufa, Russia
- Scientific career
- Fields: statistics, probability
- Workplaces: Russian Academy of Sciences, Ufa, Russia
- Doctoral advisor: Ildar Ibragimov

Nail Kutluzhanovich Bakirov (Russian: Наиль Кутлужанович Бакиров, Tatar: Наил Котлыҗан улы Бәкирев, romanized: Nail Kotlıcan uğlı Bäkirev) (30 March 1952 – 23 March 2010) was a prominent Russian statistician, professor and member of the Russian Academy of Sciences in Ufa, Russia, known for his work in the asymptotic theory of mathematical statistics.

Bakirov was born in the city of Karaganda, Kazakhstan. His father had a doctorate in geology and worked for an oil company and his mother was an ophthalmologist. In 1969 he graduated from high school in his native Kazakhstan and was accepted at the Department of Mathematics and Mechanics at Moscow State University. He earned a doctoral degree from the St. Petersburg State University in 1979. Since 1974 his life was connected with Ufa. When the Ufa Mathematics Institute was founded in 1988, Bakirov became its member. Most of his research was devoted to probability theory and mathematical statistics.

== Death ==
In 2010 he died in a road accident (hit by a car) on the way home from work in Ufa, Russia.
