= Vincent Mensah =

Beninese Roman Catholic bishop

- Bishop of Porto-Novo
- Church: Catholic Church
- Diocese: Diocese of Porto-Novo
- In office: 21 September 1970 – 29 January 2000
- Predecessor: Noël Boucheix
- Successor: Marcel Honorat Léon Agboton

Orders
- Ordination: 21 December 1952
- Consecration: 19 December 1970 by Paul Zoungrana

Personal details
- Born: 19 July 1924 Cotonou, Colony of Dahomey and Dependencies, French West Africa, French Empire
- Died: 10 March 2010 (aged 85)

Vincent Mensah (19 July 1924 – 10 March 2010) was the Catholic bishop of the Diocese of Porto Novo, Benin.

Ordained to the priesthood on 21 December 1952, Mensah was appointed bishop of the Porto Novo Diocese on 21 September 1970 and was ordained on 14 December 1970, retiring on 29 January 2000.
