= Kit Horn =

American surfer

- Born: November 10, 1929; Hollywood, California
- Died: March 25, 2010 (aged 80); Encinitas, California
- Occupation: Surfer
- Known for: Big wave surfer

Kit Horn (November 10, 1929 – March 25, 2010) was an American big wave surfer who helped popularize surfing in California and Oahu, Hawaii.

== Early life ==
Horn was born in Hollywood, California and began surfing at age 11. He attended the University of Southern California where he swam competitively and graduated in 1959. He served for two years in the Air Force, and worked in sales for a chemical company.

== Surfing career ==
He began surfing at a young age and was boyhood friends with a number of other big wave surfers, including Peter Cole. He surfed well into his 70s and was respected as a founder and popularizer of modern surfing.
