= Joe Hernandez (race caller) =

- Born: June 3, 1909
- Died: February 2, 1972 (aged 62); Arcadia, California, U.S.
- Occupation: Race caller

Joe Hernandez (June 3, 1909 – February 2, 1972) was a race caller who primarily called thoroughbred horse races at Santa Anita Park in Arcadia, California from the time the track opened on Christmas Day of 1934 until his death in 1972. During that time, he called a total of 15,587 races at the California track. Over the course of his career, his cry of "There they go!" echoed over a number of notable races including Seabiscuit’s win in the 1940 Santa Anita Handicap and Johnny Longden’s last ride in 1966.

== Career ==
Hernandez broke into the business of race calling in 1927 for Agua Caliente Racetrack at Tijuana, being developed by the first-ever race caller, Steward George Schilling, who on 5 February 1927 called the first race at the Mexican track. In 1932, he became the first race caller at Tanforan. In the coming years, he became the premiere race caller on the West Coast, at a time when most Mexicans and Mexican Americans were being repatriated to Mexico due to America's Great Depression. In the late 1930s, Alfred Vanderbilt, Jr. hired Hernandez to call the races at Pimlico Race Course and Belmont Park. While there, Hernandez encountered some discrimination when he was seen in public with his wife Pearl, an Anglo-American. In 1950, Hernandez called the Kentucky Derby for fans at Churchill Downs. A recording of his call was later distributed to over 60,000 racing fans.

== Death ==
Hernandez died on February 2, 1972 at Arcadia Methodist Hospital at the age of 62. Nearly three years after his death, on December 26, 1974, a bronze bust of Hernandez was unveiled at Santa Anita. The piece rests at the bottom of the track's main grandstand entrance. Santa Anita track officials decided to place the piece here so Hernandez could be close to his fans, and they to him. As Rudolph Alvarado noted in his biography on Hernandez (The Untold Story of Joe Hernandez: The Voice of Santa Anita), "From here the bust would also serve to introduce Joe, and what he meant to Santa Anita to future racing fans. Most importantly, placed here, Joe’s gaze would always fall on his beloved Santa Anita."
