= Clodomiro Ledesma =

Coordinates: 31°34′36.6″S 58°10′51.5″W

- Municipality and village
- Interactive map of Clodomiro Ledesma
- Country: Argentina
- Province: Entre Ríos Province
- Time zone: UTC−3 (ART)

Clodomiro Ledesma is a village and municipality in Entre Ríos Province in north-eastern Argentina.
