= Elisabeth de Stroumillo =

British journalist (1926–2010)

Olga Elisabeth Terese "Minky" de Stroumillo (17 May 1926 – 11 March 2010) was a British journalist and travel writer, who is best known for her reports in The Daily Telegraph from around the world and a series of travel guides to European countries. Born to a Russian American couple in Paris, de Stroumillo had a turbulent upbringing in France, Britain and the United States and travelled extensively in her youth before joining the Telegraph and running the travel section through the 1970s and 1980s.

== Life ==
De Stroumillo was born in 1926 in Paris, the descendant of a Russian family who had fled the Russian Revolution and a British tea plantation manager. She was sent to Britain for an education at age ten and was rapidly expelled from three schools before being sent to join her mother in the United States at the start of World War II. Returning to Britain after the war, de Stroumillo rejected an offer from Somerville College, Oxford as the other students were "spotty" and instead took a secretarial course and became engaged to an officer in the French Army who was subsequently killed in the First Indochina War. She later joined the AD Peters literary agency and travelled around India with J. B. Priestley and then worked for an airline, before beginning a career in travel writing and marrying a sculptor, Philip Turner.

De Stroumillo's work was varied and detailed, including accounts of travels in Alaska, India and much of Europe, in particular France. Under her guidance, the travel section grew in importance and attracted substantial advertising revenue and she was one of the first travel writers to recognise the growing interest in battlefield tours, working with David G. Chandler at the Somme and Balaklava. One of her three daughters died in a road accident aged seven and her husband died in 1997. De Stroumillo died on 11 March 2010 after being knocked off her scooter.
