= Václav Syrový =

Czech weightlifter

Personal information
- Nationality: Czech
- Born: 11 June 1934; Prague, Czechoslovakia
- Died: 25 March 2010 (aged 75); Nový Bor, Czech Republic

Sport
- Sport: Weightlifting

Václav Syrový (11 June 1934 – 25 March 2010) was a Czech weightlifter. He competed in the men's heavyweight event at the 1960 Summer Olympics.
