= Nery Soto =

Honduran journalist

Nery Francisco Soto Torres was a Honduran journalist who was murdered on August 14, 2014, at the age of 32. He was the seventh Honduran journalist to die violently in 2014.

== Career ==
Soto was an anchorman and reporter for Canal 23 in the city of Olanchito, Yoro, and a co-producer of the show “Cuarto Poder” on Radio Full FM.

== Murder ==
Soto was murdered on the night of August 14, 2014, in front of his house in Colonia La Conquista in the district of La Conquista, Olanchito municipality, department of Yoro, Honduras. Different sources placed the exact time of the murder at various times between 9 and 10 pm. Soto had just returned home from work and was putting his motorcycle away when he was shot at by multiple individuals who had been lying in wait. According to a colleague of Soto's at “Cuarto Poder,” journalist Osmán Guardado, Soto “was trying to take his motorcycle into his home, when – from a house undergoing construction – unknown individuals shot at him repeatedly.” Neighbors who heard the shots came to help him, but he was already dead. Nothing was stolen from him, so the police ruled out robbery as a motive.

His assailants were riding a motorcycle. The murder took place in the midst of a power outage. At the time of the murder, his wife and two daughters were inside their home. Soto's neighbors took his body to the Anibal Murillo de Olanchito Hospital. At the time of his death, Soto was only wearing shorts, a shirt, and socks, and had no valuables on him.

He was 31 years old when he died. He left two daughters, a 3-year-old and a child who was only months old.

After the murder, according to IFEX, Guardado said that Soto's death had caused “outrage amongst journalists and the Olanchito community.” A group of journalists and friends of Soto demanded that the case be solved soon and the perpetrators brought to justice. On August 18, colleagues of Soto held a peaceful march in his honor. Bety Verónica Rosales, president of the Asociación de Periodistas de Atlántida, called the murder an attack on free speech. Miguel Romero, president of the Association of Journalists in Yoro, noted that the majority of murders of journalists in the country “are unpunished” with the investigations being “completely abandoned.”

In an August 20 statement, the Committee to Protect Journalists condemned Soto Torres's killing. “Authorities must fully investigate the murder of Nery Francisco Soto Torres, including the possibility of a link to his reporting, and bring those responsible to justice," the CPJ's deputy director, Robert Mahoney, said. On August 21, 2014, the Special Rapporteur for Freedom of Expression of the Inter-American Commission on Human Rights (IACHR) condemned the murder and urged the government of Honduras “to act urgently to identify the reasons for this crime and to investigate, prosecute and punish the perpetrators and instigators of this murder charge.”

Two of Soto's colleagues told the Committee to Protect Journalists after his murder “that he was well-liked and respected and that he was careful not to be confrontational or to cross any lines in his reporting.” At the time of his death, however, according to Reporters Without Borders, he had been “investigating alleged corruption involving the mayor of the nearby city of Yoro, who is currently wanted for suspected money laundering.” IFEX noted that although Soto's reportage was usually “impartial and unbiased,” his last few news reports had been concerned with “the rationing of electricity, and corruption amongst government workers.” Another source noted that Soto had also recently criticized the frequent blackouts suffered by the population in the departments of Yoro and Bajo Aguan, and had been investigating a local criminal gang.

At about 11:30 am on August 26, 2014, law enforcement authorities arrested two suspects at a service station in Olanchito. The suspects were identified as Carlos Javier Martínez Ponce (age 28), who was believed to be the perpetrator, and Marcelino Edilberto Martinez (age 22), who was suspected of involvement in the crime. Both suspects were carrying guns at the time of arrest.

== Honors and awards ==
In May 2014, on Journalist Day, Soto had been awarded the prize of “Newcomer of the Year” by the city of Olanchito in recognition of his “outstanding reporting.”
