= Ebet Kadarusman =

Indonesian broadcaster (1936 – 2010)

Ebet Kadarusman (July 7, 1936 – March 20, 2010) was an Indonesian television and radio presenter and host. He was known to audiences for the phrase, "It is nice to be important, but it is more important to be nice", which he used on his television talk show, Salam Canda.

== Biography ==
He was born in Tasikmalaya on July 7, 1936, though some sources state that he may have been born in Jakarta. He began his career as a presenter for ABC radio in Australia, where he resided for more than 30 years. He returned to Indonesia in 1986.

In November 1990, he began hosting a popular radio show called, Good Pagi, Selamat Morning. His television tak show, Salam Canda, which was hosted in both English and Bahasa Indonesian launched in 1991 on the private television network, RCTI.

Ebet suffered three strokes between 2001 and 2010. He died of complications from his most recent stroke just before 6 a.m. on March 20, 2010, at Hasan Sadikin Hospital in Bandung at the age of 73. he had been in a coma since suffering the stroke on March 16.

Ebet was survived by five children from his first marriage - Andre Kadarusman in Singapore, Valerie in Sydney, Iriany in Melbourne, Julia in New York, and Michelle in Canada. His second wife, a widow, also had five children.

Ebet was buried at Sarijadi cemetery in Bandung.
