= Carlos Salgado =

Honduran radio journalist and comedian (1940–2007)

- Born: May 21, 1940; Honduras
- Died: October 11, 2007 (aged 67); Tegucigalpa, Honduras
- Cause of death: Murder (by gun)
- Body discovered: Found shot outside of the offices of Radio Cadena Voces in Tegucigalpa, Honduras
- Other names: "Frijol el terrible" aka "black bean the terrible"
- Occupation: Radio-Journalist
- Years active: 20+ years
- Employer(s): Dagoberto Rodriguez, director of Radio Cadena Voces
- Known for: Political and comedic radio commentator known for his program "Frijol el terrible" which aired on Radio Cadena Voces
- Style: Used his sense of humor to deliver political messages to a widespread Honduran audience via radio
- Spouse: Sandra Aguilar

Carlos Salgado (May 21, 1940 – October 11, 2007) was a Honduran radio journalist and comedian. Salgado hosted a satirical radio show called Bean the Terrible and focused on social commentary and the satirising of well-known public figures in Honduras. His career as a popular radio journalist and commentator lasted more than 40 years.

== Assassination ==
Salgado was shot several times as he left his job at Radio Cadena Voices in Tegucigalpa on October 11, 2007. He was taken to a local hospital in the capital city where he was pronounced dead. Salgado was 67 years old. Salgado's killers escaped. It was unclear exactly why Salgado was murdered, though his radio show often criticized social conditions and politics in Honduras.

Before the murder, some of the station's journalists had been intimidated and received death threats. Manuel Zelaya had said to the station's correspondent Carolina Torres "If I was Hugo Chávez, I would have had this radio station shut down a long time ago." Salgado's killing came at a time of increased tension between the Honduran media and the government of Honduran President Manuel Zelaya. The Honduran media had been increasingly critical of several of Zelaya's policies.
