= José Bayardo Mairena Ramírez =

Honduran radio journalist

José Bayardo Mairena Ramírez (1958 – March 26, 2010) was a Honduran radio journalist. Mairena, and his colleague, Manuel de Jesús Juárez, was one of five Honduran journalists to be murdered in Honduras during March 2010.

On March 26, 2010, Mairena and his colleague, Manuel de Jesús Juárez, were ambushed while driving in eastern Honduras. Mairena and Juarez had just finished hosting a radio program when the vehicle they were driving was attacked near the town of Juticalpa in the eastern Olancho Department. The unidentified gunmen opened fire on the car and then shot both journalists. Juarez was 52 years old at the time of his killing.

Mairena was one of five journalists to be murdered in Honduras during March 2010.
