= Anibal Barrow =

Honduran journalist and news anchor

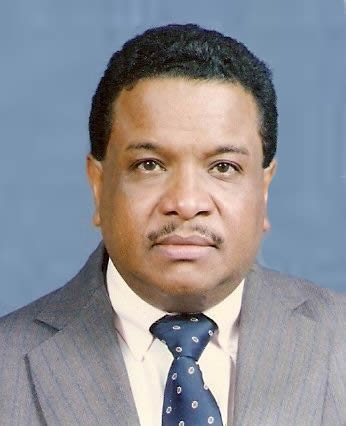

Aníbal Barrow (September 15, 1948 in San Pedro Sula – June 24, 2013) was a Honduran journalist and news anchor who had a television show on Globo TV from 05:30–07:30 from Monday to Friday. He was also a trained agronomist who at the time of his death was a professor of mathematics at the Universidad Nacional Autónoma de Honduras.

In June 2013 he was kidnapped and murdered in San Pedro Sula, with the newspaper La Prensa described Barrow's murder as “the most ruthless crime against a communicator (journalist) in the annals of Honduran history.” He was the 36th journalist in Honduras to have been killed in a decade, and the 26th to have been killed since the June 2009 coup d’état.

== Early life and education ==
Barrow's parents separated when he was six or eight years old. He attended primary and secondary school in Omoa, where he lived with his paternal grandfather, finishing secondary school in Tegucigalpa.

He then studied at the Regional University Center of the Atlantic Coast (CURLA), where he received a degree in agronomical engineering. He also earned a degree in journalism at CURN (the Northern Regional University Center), now the Universidad Nacional Autónoma de Honduras, in the Valle de Sula).

While he was a student at the Universidad Nacional Autónoma de Honduras he was an active member of the United University Democratic Front (Frente Unido Universitario Democrático, FUUD), and was in charge of logistical coordination and public relations for that group.

== Career ==
=== Journalism ===
In La Ceiba, Barrow worked in the radio. He then moved to San Pedro Sula, where he began working in journalism. From 1992 to 1996, according to one source, he worked at Vica TV on “Starting Early” (Desde Temprano), an early-morning news program that was broadcast on national television. (Another account of his career states that Barrow worked on “Starting Early” until 2010.)

After leaving Vica, Barrow began broadcasting his own program, “Aníbal Barrow and Nothing More” (Aníbal Barrow y Nada Más) on channel 42 of Hondured Television. At first it was broadcast on weekdays between 4 and 8 am. Later it was shortened to an hour.

News reports dating to 2009 indicate that as of that year, Barrow was associated with Hondured. In July 2009, at the time of the Honduran coup, he and three other journalists, Patricia Arias of Canal 8, Allan McDonald of the El Heraldo, and Esdras Amado López, owner of the Canal 36 television station, were feared missing, but it turned out that they, along with other journalists, had “decided to lay low because of the ongoing political crisis.” Contemporaneous reports on this matter identified Barrow as an associate of Hondured.

Barrow's own Facebook postings indicate that as of 2011 was the moderator of a regular evening program called “Theories and Realities” on Hondored and was also the host of the morning talk and commentary series, “Aníbal and Nothing More,” which at that point was airing from 6 to 8 am on both Hondured and TVH.

By the time of his death Barrow had moved to Globo TV, taking with him the morning talk show, “Aníbal and Nothing More,” that he had previously hosted on Hondured. It aired on Globo TV on weekdays from 5:30 to 7:30 am. On the program he mostly commented on current events but did not engage in investigative journalism.

At the time of his death he was also regularly hosting a radio program on Radio Norte, “Two to Eleven,” (Dos a las once) with his colleague Jorge Oseguera. They had been working together on the program since 2011.

Ricardo Mencia, Barrow's producer at Vica and later at Hondured, said that working with him was “very special” and turned Mencia into a professional in all areas of life.” Mencia described Barrow as “a kind and caring person who takes out his very heart to give it to others.” Mencia said that “Aníbal and Nothing More” became a program that was “out of the ordinary” because Barrow “jokes and chats with the people without denying anyone their right to freedom of expression, even if they are not at the moment in accord with the views of the general public.”

Mencia praised Barrow's combination of “joviality and traditionalism” and noted that for a time he always had with him on the television program a pair of maracas, which he played on the air while saying the nonsense words “naca naca pirinaca, ni fu ni fa, machaca chu, sunga tunga marunga tanga,” which became famous in Honduras. Whenever asked what these words meant, Barrow said only that it was “all part of the show.”

Another famous feature of the show was a toy rooster that emitted a bizarre crowing sound, the conceit being that the rooster was there to awaken the viewers of the early-morning show.

David Fernando Torres, also a former media colleague, said that Barrow had taught him responsibility and punctuality.

After Barrow's death, his friend José Israel Navarro Carrasco, an Air Force colonel, under the headline “Naca Naca Pirinaca,” recalled that Barrow had begun every morning's edition of “Anibal and Nothing More” by making drumming gestures and reciting that nonsense phrase. Navarro described him as a man who was “always jovial, analytical, and combative” and who always “spoke the truth to everyone.” Navarro wrote that he had never heard Barrow “rail against his political opponents,” and memorialized him as a “soldier hero who has fallen in the daily combat for information....The voice and the pen will never be silenced, someone will always pick up the flag.”

=== Academic career ===
In addition to his journalistic work, Barrow was a longtime professor of mathematics. He began working as an educator at the University Center of the Atlantic Coast (CURLA) in the 1980s. In 1996 he transferred to the Department of Mathematics at UNAH-VS, where he taught a class in quantitative methods from 5:00 pm to 7:00 pm.

After his disappearance, his students remembered him as an exemplary professor who always brought them coffee and doughnuts on Mondays. A former student who had since moved to the U.S. recalled that Barrow never grew frustrated or arrogant if students did not understand a math problem, and would patiently explain it twenty times if necessary. The chairman of the Mathematics Department at UNAH-VS, Raul Alvarado, described Barrow as “extremely responsible” and praised his dedication and collaborative spirit. Others called him a man of high principle and character.

== Other activities ==
During the administrations of Carlos Roberto Reina (1994-1998) and Carlos Roberto Flores (1998-2002), Barrow served as regional director of the Institute for Professional Training (Instituto de Formación Profesional, INFOP).

== Views ==
Barrow was a Catholic and a member of the Liberal Party.

“Ideologies distract us like a circus,” he wrote on Facebook in 2011. “Journalists should contribute with the truth and leave the media show aside.”

He also wrote: “Honduras cannot keep having empty conversations; there is a great deal of poverty and we need to find solutions, rich and poor.”

== Libel lawsuit ==
Barrow was convicted of libel in 2006 in a lawsuit brought by another journalist, Roxana Guevara. He was sentenced to two years and eight months in prison for saying, on programs broadcast on December 21 and 26, 2001, that Guevara had stolen videos of Hurricane Mitch that were part of reports for which Guevara had won a prize.

== Kidnapping and murder ==
Barrow was kidnapped on June 24, 2013, on the outskirts of San Pedro Sula, Honduras, while traveling in a car with a driver and members of his family. At the time of the abduction, his blue Honda CRV was reportedly sitting still in traffic that was caused by an accident. Authorities said that he was abducted by at least ten armed assailants who had been seen in a white Mitsubishi without license plates. One source reported that three family members were abducted with him but were released unharmed; another source said he was travelling at the time with his daughter-in-law and grandson, in addition to a driver, and that these three persons were taken with him but released unharmed. Barrow's captors drove him to Las Cañeras, an area in the Department of Cortes between San Pedro Sula and the municipality of San Manuel.

No ransom request was ever made. Later the same day, Barrow's vehicle was found behind a sugar-cane refinery in Las Cañeras. There was a bullet hole in one door and there were traces of blood inside the vehicle. One of the perpetrators, who eventually came into the custody of authorities and was held as a protected witness, told the police where Barrow's body was located, At around 9:00 on the morning of July 9, 2013, Barrow's burned and dismembered torso, from which the arms, legs, and head had been removed, was found by the Siboney lagoon in the Dos Caminos district of Villanueva, about 20 kilometers from San Pedro Sula. Authorities believed that Barrow had been killed on the day of his abduction. His head and limbs were found later on July 9. Police discovered Barrow's clothing and bankbook in the vicinity of his body. The remains were identified by means of forensic tests.

The last message sent by Barrow on his mobile phone read: “The truth prevails and triumphs sooner or later.”

=== Arrests ===
Four members of the Gordo criminal gang were arrested in connection with the murder on July 5. Two of them, Gustavo Armando Durán Banegas (23) and Delmer Donael Durán Banegas (21), were apprehended in the Altos de Santa Fe neighborhood of Dos Caminos in Villanueva. In the Brisas del Cacao neighborhood of Lomas del Carmen, José Hernán Díaz Mejía (44) and Ibis Laurent Lara Pereira (24) were taken into custody.

As of July 9, at least four other persons were being actively sought by the police, all of them identified as material participants in the crime: Héctor Noel Baquedano Galindo, Heber Natanael Mendoza Contreras, Denis Omar Ramírez Martínez, and an unnamed minor. The above-mentioned protected witness told police that a criminal group had been paid 400,000 lempiras (about $20,000) to kill Barrow. Some news media reported that a “highly placed” individual had ordered and paid for the murder.

=== Reactions ===
“We express our solidarity with Barrow’s family and all Honduran journalists, who are traumatized by this barbaric crime,” Reporters Without Borders said. “While the investigation has already produced some results, the murder will remain unpunished as long as the instigators have not been identified and brought to trial.” Reporters Without Borders added: “It seems highly probable that Barrow’s murder was linked to his work as a journalist.”

Irina Bokova, the Director-General of UNESCO, denounced the killing of Barrow. “I trust that the authorities will be able to bring to justice those responsible for this crime which undermines freedom of expression in Honduras and journalists’ ability to exercise their profession. Letting crimes against journalists go unpunished seriously undermines press freedom.”

Juan Mairena, president of the Honduran Press Association, said, “This horrendous crime intimidates all Honduran journalists. We strongly urge authorities to clarify...whether or not the motive [for the crime] was his profession.”

The President of Honduras, Porfirio Lobo Sosa, declared national mourning and issued a statement condemning the murder and expressing condolences to his family, friends, and viewing audience.

The UN has identified Honduras as having the highest murder rate in the world and San Pedro Sula as being the city with the world's highest murder rate.

=== Funeral ===
Barrow's funeral took place on July 11 at St. Vincent de Paul church in San Pedro Sula. He was buried in Memorial Gardens cemetery.

=== Investigation ===
It was reported on July 27 that after Barrow had started broadcasting his program on Globo TV, he had begun to receive e-mailed death threats. In addition, it was revealed that on June 24, Barrow had seemed worried and explained to a confidant that he was receiving threats, but did not go into detail about them. Another individual who provided testimony to the police said that on June 15, he had been in a restaurant in Tegucigalpa with Barrow when the latter received several threats on his cell phone. The person sending the threat had said he would come get Barrow, in response to which Barrow had told him to do so and told him the name of the restaurant at which they were eating. Yet another witness said that on June 22 Barrow had received three threatening calls, in response to the last of which Barrow had replied: “if...you know where I am, come look for me, I'm waiting here.”

It also emerged that on the morning of June 24, Barrow had received a call from a person who claimed to be a congressional candidate belonging to the Colon party, and who said he wanted to meet him. Over the course of the day, this person phoned Barrow about sixteen times. According to one witness, Barrow, who had been riding on a bus, complained that the man's frequent phone calls had prevented him from sleeping on the bus. The caller insisted that Barrow meet with him, and Barrow finally agreed, saying that he had to be at the university and would rest a little afterwards and could meet the man later in San Pedro Sula. Later that day, the man met Barrow on a dirt road near the Metropolitan Olympic Stadium, showed him a video on his camera, and gave indications that he was interested in purchasing ad time on Barrow's program. The connection between all this information and the murder was not made clear to the public.

== Personal life ==
Barrow married Leda Maradiaga in 1983. They had three children: Anibal, Fernando, and Astrid. After his death they described him as very loving and supportive in every way.

Barrow's son Anibal was born in 1985, attended the Instituto Experimental La Salle and UNICAH, the Catholic University of Honduras. He won a seat representing the Department of Cortes in the Honduran Congress in the November 2013 elections.

Barrow was a passionate fan of the Olimpia soccer team.

After Barrow's murder, his son said: “We forgive the people who did this because it is not up to us to say what should happen to them.”
