= Clodomiro Castilla =

Colombian journalist, editor and radio reporter

Clodomiro Castilla (died March 20, 2010) was a Colombian journalist, editor of El Pulso del Tiempo magazine and radio reporter for La Voz de Monteria.

Castilla was a frequent critics of local government corruption in Córdoba Department. In particular, Castilla was known for reporting on Salvatore Mancuso, a local paramilitary leader who was extradited to the United States to face drug trafficking charges in 2008. Mancuso had strong links to local politicians and business interests. He had received death threats for reporting on the connection between local politicians and paramilitary death squads which operate in northern Colombia. He had bodyguards for two years.

Castilla was shot and killed on March 20, 2010, by two unidentified gunmen while reading a book on the terrace of his home in El Puente, a suburb of the departmental capital, Montería. He was survived by four children.

Castilla's killing was the second murder of a journalist in Colombia in 2010. Colombian President Alvaro Uribe, who owns a ranch near Monteria, condemned Castilla's murder, "We have made every effort to stop the threat of assassinations against journalists...Just when we thought we had overcome the tragic situation, more killings of journalists appear. The police posted a $26,000 USD reward for the capture of his killers.

Rafael Gomez, the editor and owner of La Voz de Monteria radio station, where Castilla worked at the time of his death, explained that Córdoba Department is a particularly dangerous area for journalists in Colombia, "We are in the worst location in Colombia...Nobody dares to say anything. We are the only ones."
