= Nahúm Elí Palacios Arteaga =

Honduran journalist and reporter

- Died: March 14, 2010

Nahúm Elí Palacios Arteaga (died March 14, 2010) was a Honduran journalist and reporter. Palacios was the news director for the Canal 5 television network in Aguán and the host of a news program on Radio Tocoa within the Colón Department along the Caribbean coast.

== Biography ==
An investigative reporter, Palacios focused on local politics, drug trafficking and violence in Honduras. He was also known for reporting on an ongoing conflict between landowners and peasant farmers in the northern Aguán region of the country. Palacios reportedly received threats from members of the Honduran military in June 2009 for critical coverage of the 2009 Honduran coup d'état which ousted former President Manuel Zelaya. He also received anonymous death threats from criminal organizations operating in the country. The Inter-American Commission on Human Rights (IACHR) urged the government to specifically protect Palacios in July 2009.

=== Assassination ===
Palacios was shot and killed while driving home at approximately 10:30 pm on March 14, 2010. Palacios was driving in the northern city of Tocoa when two cars came alongside his car and fired at his vehicle with AK-47 assault rifles. Palacios, who was shot several times, died at the scene of the attack. The car in which Palacios was travelling received 42 bullet holes in the attack. A woman in his car was treated for injuries at a local hospital, while a cameraman escaped the attack unharmed. Palacios was 36 years old when he died.

Palacios was one of five journalists to be killed in Honduras in March 2010.

=== Reaction ===
Palacios's killing triggered protests by dozens of journalists on March 15, 2010, in the city of San Pedro Sula. The journalists demanded an end to violence against colleagues in the country.
