= Manuel de Jesús Juárez =

Honduran radio journalist

Manuel de Jesús Juárez (1955 – March 26, 2010) was a Honduran radio journalist. Juarez, and his colleague, José Bayardo Mairena Ramírez, was one of five Honduran journalists to be murdered in Honduras during March 2010.

On March 26, 2010, Juarez and his colleague, José Bayardo Mairena Ramírez, were ambushed while driving in eastern Honduras. Juarez had just finished hosting a radio program when the vehicle they were driving was attacked near the town of Juticalpa in the eastern Olancho Department. The unidentified gunmen opened fire on the car and then shot both journalists. Juarez was 55 years old at the time.

Juarez was one of five journalists to be murdered in Honduras during March 2010.
