= Werner Arnold (weightlifter) =

German weightlifter (1931–2025)

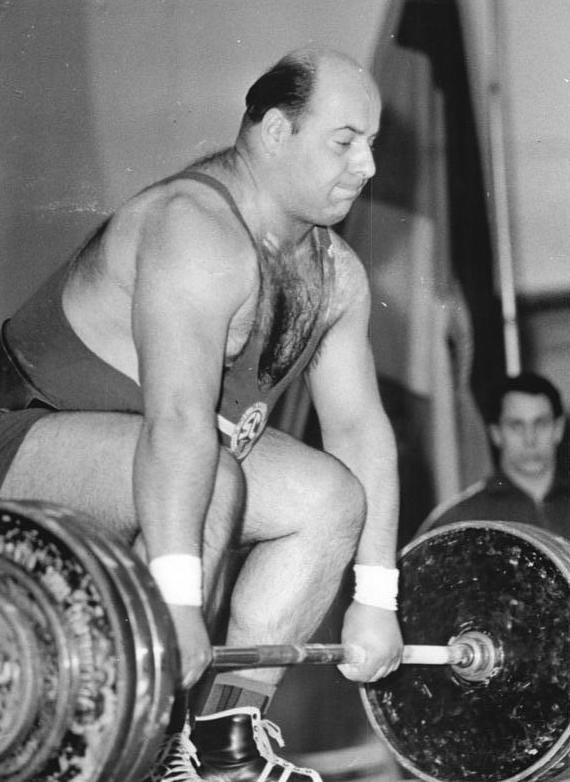
- Arnold in 1965

Personal information
- Born: 11 June 1931 Oberlungwitz, Germany
- Died: 14 March 2025 (aged 93) Oberlungwitz, Germany
- Height: 1.74 m (5 ft 9 in)
- Weight: 115 kg (254 lb)

Sport
- Sport: Weightlifting
- Club: SC Karl-Marx-Stadt

Werner Arnold (11 June 1931 – 14 March 2025) was a German weightlifter. He competed at the 1960 Summer Olympics in the heavyweight category and finished in 12th place. He won six East German championships in 1957–1961 and 1965.
