= Patricia Mulcahy =

U.S. Space Force senior leader

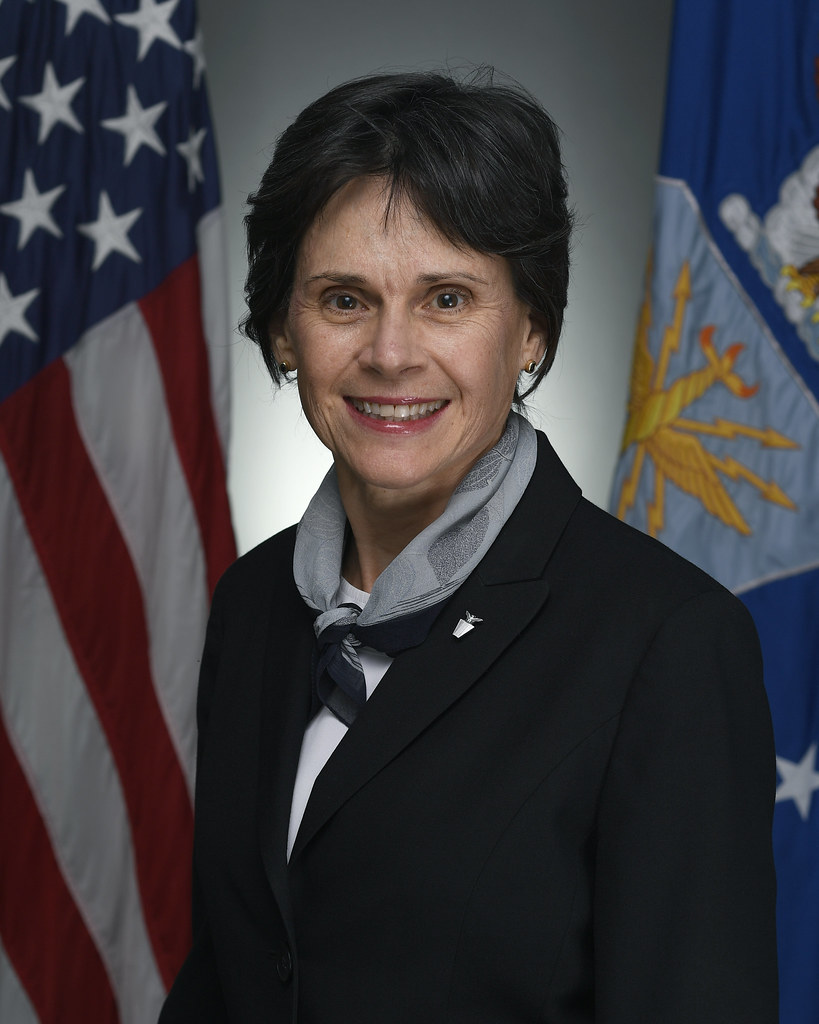
- Official portrait, 2020
- Born: c. 1958 (age 67–68)
- Military career
- Allegiance: United States
- Branch: United States Army
- Service years: 1980–2009
- Rank: Colonel
- Commands: 18th Soldier Support Group; 24th Personnel Services Battalion; 187th Personnel Services Company
- Awards: Distinguished Service Medal; Defense Superior Service Medal; Legion of Merit; Bronze Star Medal; Office of the Secretary of Defense Medal for Exceptional Civilian Service
- Patricia Mulcahy's voice Mulcahy's opening statement at a House Armed Services Military Personnel Subcommittee hearing on talent management and reorganization Recorded February 8, 2022

Patricia Mulcahy (born c. 1958) is a member of the Senior Executive Service and a retired United States Army colonel who served as the deputy chief of space Operations for personnel of the United States Space Force. Prior to that she was the Deputy Assistant Secretary of the Air Force for Force Management Integration.

Mulcahy was commissioned in the U.S. Army from the Siena College Reserve Officer Training Corps program. She served at every level in the field of military personnel management and personnel service support, including company, battalion and brigade command, as well as key staff assignments in the 3rd Infantry Division, Office of the Deputy Chief of Staff for Personnel (Army G-1), and the United States European Command. She retired as a colonel after 29 years of service. Following her retirement from the Army in 2009 she served as a federal civilian employee in several military personnel policy positions in the Office of the Under Secretary of Defense for Personnel and Readiness.

== Education ==
- 1980 Bachelor of Science, Rhetoric and Communications, State University of New York, Albany
- 1980 Adjutant General Basic Officer Course, Fort Benjamin Harrison, Ind.
- 1981 U.S. Army Airborne School, Fort Lee, Va.
- 1984 Adjutant General Advanced Career Course, Fort Benjamin Harrison, Ind.
- 1995 Master of Military Arts & Sciences, Army Command and General Staff College, Fort Leavenworth, Kan.
- 2000 Master of Science, Industrial College of the Armed Forces, Fort Lesly J. McNair, Washington, D.C.
- 2016 APEX Senior Executive Orientation, Office of the Secretary of Defense, Washington, D.C.

== Assignments ==
1. September 1980-October 1982, Assistant Brigade S1, Fort Lee, Va.
2. October 1982-September 1983, Chief, Enlisted Management/Records, Fort Lee, Va.
3. September 1983-January 1985, Chief, Army Community Services, Fort Lee, Va.
4. January 1985-September 1985, Chief, Officer Management, Fort Devens, Mass.
5. September 1985-January 1987, Company Commander, 382nd Personnel Services Company, Fort Devens, Mass.
6. January 1987-April 1989, Deputy Adjutant General, Fort Devens, Mass.
7. August 1989-August 1991, Assignment Officer, Schwetzingen, Germany & Saudi Arabia
8. August 1991-June 1993, Commander, 187th Personnel Services Company, Mannheim, Germany
9. June 1993-June 1994, Executive Officer, 21st Personnel & Replacement Battalion, Frankfurt, Germany
10. June 1995-July 1996, G-1, 3rd Infantry Division, Fort Stewart, Ga.
11. July 1996-August 1998, Commander, 24th Personnel Services Battalion, Fort Stewart, Ga.
12. August 1998-July 1999, Chief, Enlisted Policy Branch, Army G-1, the Pentagon, Arlington, Va.
13. July 2000-June 2001, Director, Strategic Planning Cell, Army G-1, the Pentagon, Arlington, Va.
14. June 2001-July 2003, Commander, 18th Soldier Support Group, Fort Bragg, N.C.
15. July 2003-August 2006, U.S. European Command J-1, Vaihingen, Germany
16. August 2006-June 2009, Executive Officer to the Army G-1, the Pentagon, Arlington, Va.
17. October 2009-February 2010, Deputy Director for Policy, Defense Travel Management Office, Ballston, Va.
18. February 2010-August 2012, Director, Human Capital Management, Office of the Under Secretary of Defense for Personnel and Readiness, the Pentagon, Arlington, Va.
19. August 2012-January 2013, Director, Management Support Office, Alexandria, Va.
20. January 2013-June 2016, Assistant Director for Military Compensation, OUSD P&R, the Pentagon, Arlington, Va.
21. June 2016-August 2019, Director, Officer & Enlisted Personnel Management, OUSD P&R, the Pentagon, Arlington, Va.
22. September 2019-August 2020, Deputy Assistant Secretary of the Air Force for Force Management Integration, the Pentagon, Arlington, Va.
23. August 2020 – June 2022, Deputy Chief of Space Operations, Personnel, Office of the Chief of Space Operations, Pentagon, Arlington, Va.

Military offices
Preceded by Jeffrey R. Mayo	Deputy Assistant Secretary of the Air Force for Force Management Integration; 2019–2020	Succeeded by Mark R. Engelbaum
New office	Deputy Chief of Space Operations for Personnel of the United States Space Force; 2020–2022	Succeeded by Katharine Kelley
