= Joseph Hernández Ochoa =

Honduran journalist and television presenter

Joseph Hernández Ochoa (1983/84 – March 2, 2010) was a Honduran journalist and television presenter. He hosted an entertainment show on the Honduran television network, Channel 51 and was a journalism student at the National Autonomous University of Honduras.

On March 2, 2010, Hernández was driving a colleague, Karol Cabrera, a host on a private radio station, Radio Cadena Voces, through the El Chile neighborhood of Tegucigalpa. The two journalists were ambushed by gunmen around 8 p.m. Hernández was shot several times and died at the scene of the attack. Cabrera, who had received death threats before the attack, suffered gunshot wounds to her left arm, but survived the attack. Hernández was 26 years old.
