= La Prensa (Honduras) =

Honduran newspaper

Diario La Prensa
- Type: Daily newspaper
- Format: Broadsheet
- Staff writers: 350
- Founded: 1964
- Headquarters: San Pedro Sula
- Website: www.laprensa.hn

La Prensa (lit. 'The Press') is a Honduran newspaper founded on 26 October 1964, by Organización Publicitaria, S.A., whose publications also include El Heraldo and Diario Deportivo Diez. In 2008, La Prensa reported its audited circulation as 61,000 units. It has full color and tabloid-sized pages. Although it is distributed all across the country, it is in the north area of Honduras where its presence is more important.

== Family business ==
Jorge Canahuati Larach is the president of Organización Publicitaria. His grandfather, the founder of the company, Jorge J. Larach, died in 1985. Canahuati has been a member of the Inter American Press Association Executive Committee.

== Notable people ==
- Ángela Valle (1927–2003), writer, journalist, essayist
