= List of Catholic dioceses in Africa =

== List of dioceses in Africa ==
=== Episcopal Conference of Algeria ===
==== Ecclesiastical Province of Alger ====
- Archdiocese of Alger
  - Diocese of Constantine
  - Diocese of Oran

=== Episcopal Conference of Angola ===
See also List of Catholic dioceses in Angola

==== Ecclesiastical Province of Huambo ====
- Archdiocese of Huambo
  - Diocese of Benguela
  - Diocese of Kwito-Bié
  - Diocese of Ganda

==== Ecclesiastical Province of Luanda ====
- Archdiocese of Luanda
  - Diocese of Cabinda
  - Diocese of Caxito
  - Diocese of Mbanza Congo
  - Diocese of Sumbe
  - Diocese of Viana

==== Ecclesiastical Province of Lubango ====
- Archdiocese of Lubango
  - Diocese of Menongue
  - Diocese of Ondjiva

==== Ecclesiastical Province of Malanje ====
- Archdiocese of Malanje
  - Diocese of Ndalatando
  - Diocese of Uije

==== Ecclesiastical Province of Saurímo ====
- Archdiocese of Saurímo
  - Diocese of Dundo
  - Diocese of Lwena

=== Ecclesiastical Conference of Benin ===
==== Ecclesiastical Province of Cotonou ====
- Archdiocese of Cotonou
  - Diocese of Abomey
  - Diocese of Dassa-Zoumé
  - Diocese of Lokossa
  - Diocese of Porto Novo

==== Ecclesiastical Province of Parakou ====
- Archdiocese of Parakou
  - Diocese of Abomey
  - Diocese of Djougou
  - Diocese of Kandi
  - Diocese of Natitingou
  - Diocese of N’Dali

=== Ecclesiastical Conference of Burkina Faso ===
==== Ecclesiastical Province of Bobo-Dioulasso ====
- Archdiocese of Bobo-Dioulasso
  - Diocese of Banfora
  - Diocese of Dédougou
  - Diocese of Diébougou
  - Diocese of Nouna

==== Ecclesiastical Province of Koupéla ====
- Archdiocese of Koupéla
  - Diocese of Dori
  - Diocese of Fada N’Gourma
  - Diocese of Kaya

==== Ecclesiastical Province of Ouagadougou ====
- Archdiocese of Ouagadougou
  - Diocese of Koudougou
  - Diocese of Manga
  - Diocese of Ouahigouya

=== Ecclesiastical Conference of Burundi ===
==== Ecclesiastical Province of Bujumbura ====
- Archdiocese of Bujumbura
  - Diocese of Bubanza
  - Diocese of Bururi

==== Ecclesiastical Province of Gitega ====
- Archdiocese of Gitega
  - Diocese of Muyinga
  - Diocese of Ngozi
  - Diocese of Ruyigi

=== Ecclesiastical Conference of Cameroon ===
==== Ecclesiastical Province of Bamenda ====
- Archdiocese of Bamenda
  - Diocese of Buéa
  - Diocese of Kumbo
  - Diocese of Mamfe

==== Ecclesiastical Province of Bertoua ====
- Archdiocese of Bertoua
  - Diocese of Batouri
  - Diocese of Doumé–Abong’ Mbang
  - Diocese of Yokadouma

==== Ecclesiastical Province of Douala ====
- Archdiocese of Douala
  - Diocese of Bafoussam
  - Diocese of Edéa
  - Diocese of Eséka
  - Diocese of Nkongsamba

==== Ecclesiastical Province of Garoua ====
- Archdiocese of Garoua
  - Diocese of Maroua-Mokolo
  - Diocese of Ngaoundéré
  - Diocese of Yagoua

==== Ecclesiastical Province of Yaoundé ====
- Archdiocese of Yaoundé
  - Diocese of Bafia
  - Diocese of Ebolowa
  - Diocese of Kribi
  - Diocese of Mbalmayo
  - Diocese of Obala
  - Diocese of Sangmélima

=== Episcopal Conference of the Central African Republic ===
==== Ecclesiastical Province of Bangui ====
- Archdiocese of Bangui
  - Diocese of Alindao
  - Diocese of Bambari
  - Diocese of Bangassou
  - Diocese of Berbérati
  - Diocese of Bossangoa
  - Diocese of Bouar
  - Diocese of Kaga-Bandoro
  - Diocese of Mbaïki

=== Episcopal Conference of Chad ===
==== Ecclesiastical Province of N'Djamena ====
- Archdiocese of N'Djamena
  - Diocese of Doba
  - Diocese of Goré
  - Diocese of Lai
  - Diocese of Moundou
  - Diocese of Pala
  - Diocese of Sarh
  - Prelature of Mongo

=== Episcopal Conference of the Republic of the Congo ===
==== Ecclesiastical Province of Brazzaville ====
- Archdiocese of Brazzaville
  - Diocese of Dolisie
  - Diocese of Gamboma
  - Diocese of Impfondo
  - Diocese of Kinkala
  - Diocese of Nkayi
  - Diocese of Ouesso
  - Diocese of Owando
  - Diocese of Pointe-Noire

=== Episcopal Conference of the Democratic Republic of the Congo ===
==== Ecclesiastical Province of Bukavu ====
- Archdiocese of Bukavu
  - Diocese of Butembo-Beni
  - Diocese of Goma
  - Diocese of Kasongo
  - Diocese of Kindu
  - Diocese of Uvira

==== Ecclesiastical Province of Kananga ====
- Archdiocese of Kananga
  - Diocese of Kabinda
  - Diocese of Kole
  - Diocese of Luebo
  - Diocese of Luiza
  - Diocese of Mbujimayi
  - Diocese of Mweka
  - Diocese of Tshumbe

==== Ecclesiastical Province of Kinshasa ====
- Archdiocese of Kinshasa
  - Diocese of Boma
  - Diocese of Idiofa
  - Diocese of Kenge
  - Diocese of Kikwit
  - Diocese of Kisantu
  - Diocese of Matadi
  - Diocese of Popokabaka

==== Ecclesiastical Province of Kisangani ====
- Archdiocese of Douala
  - Diocese of Bondo
  - Diocese of Bunia
  - Diocese of Buta
  - Diocese of Doruma-Dungu
  - Diocese of Isangi
  - Diocese of Isiro-Niangara
  - Diocese of Mahagi-Nioka
  - Diocese of Wamba

==== Ecclesiastical Province of Lubumbashi ====
- Archdiocese of Lubumbashi
  - Diocese of Kalemie-Kirungu
  - Diocese of Kamina
  - Diocese of Kilwa-Kasenga
  - Diocese of Kolwezi
  - Diocese of Kongolo
  - Diocese of Manono
  - Diocese of Sakania-Kipushi

==== Ecclesiastical Province of Mbandaka-Bikoro ====
- Archdiocese of Mbandaka-Bikoro
  - Diocese of Basankusu
  - Diocese of Bokungu-Ikela
  - Diocese of Budjala
  - Diocese of Lisala
  - Diocese of Lolo
  - Diocese of Molegbe

=== Episcopal Conference of Côte d’Ivoire ===
==== Ecclesiastical Province of Abidjan ====
- Archdiocese of Abidjan
  - Diocese of Agboville
  - Diocese of Grand-Bassam
  - Diocese of Yopougon

==== Ecclesiastical Province of Bouaké ====
- Archdiocese of Bouaké
  - Diocese of Abengourou
  - Diocese of Bondoukou
  - Diocese of Yamoussoukro

==== Ecclesiastical Province of Gagnoa ====
- Archdiocese of Gagnoa
  - Diocese of Daloa
  - Diocese of Man
  - Diocese of San Pedro-en-Côte d'Ivoire

==== Ecclesiastical Province of Korhogo ====
- Archdiocese of Korhogo
  - Diocese of Katiola
  - Diocese of Odienné

=== Episcopal Conference of Equatorial Guinea ===
==== Ecclesiastical Province of Malabo ====
- Archdiocese of Malabo
  - Diocese of Bata
  - Diocese of Ebebiyin

=== Episcopal Conference of Eritrea ===
==== Ecclesiastical Province of Asmara ====
- Archeparchy of Asmara
  - Eparchy of Barentu
  - Eparchy of Keren
  - Eparchy of Segheneyti

=== Episcopal Conference of Ethiopia and Eritrea ===
==== Ecclesiastical Province of Addis Abeba ====
- Archeparchy of Addis Abeba
  - Eparchy of Adigrat
  - Eparchy of Bahir Dar-Dessie
  - Eparchy of Emdeber

=== Episcopal Conference of Gabon ===
==== Ecclesiastical Province of Libreville ====
- Archdiocese of Libreville
  - Diocese of Franceville
  - Diocese of Mouila
  - Diocese of Oyem
  - Diocese of Port-Gentil

=== Episcopal Conference of Ghana ===
==== Ecclesiastical Province of Accra ====
- Archdiocese of Accra
  - Diocese of Ho
  - Diocese of Jasikan
  - Diocese of Keta-Akatsi
  - Diocese of Koforidua

==== Ecclesiastical Province of Cape Coast ====
- Archdiocese of Cape Coast
  - Diocese of Sekondi-Takoradi
  - Diocese of Wiawso

==== Ecclesiastical Province of Kumasi ====
- Archdiocese of Kumasi
  - Diocese of Goaso
  - Diocese of Konongo-Mampong
  - Diocese of Obuasi
  - Diocese of Sunyani

==== Ecclesiastical Province of Tamale ====
- Archdiocese of Tamale
  - Diocese of Damongo
  - Diocese of Navrongo-Bolgatanga
  - Diocese of Wa
  - Diocese of Yendi

=== Episcopal Conference of Guinea ===
==== Ecclesiastical Province of Conakry ====
- Archdiocese of Conakry
  - Diocese of Kankan
  - Diocese of N’Zérékoré

=== Episcopal Cenference of Guinea-Bissau ===
- List of Catholic dioceses in Guinea-Bissau

=== Episcopal Conference of Kenya ===
==== Ecclesiastical Province of Kisumu ====
- Archdiocese of Kisumu
  - Diocese of Bungoma
  - Diocese of Eldoret
  - Diocese of Homa Bay
  - Diocese of Kakamega
  - Diocese of Kisii
  - Diocese of Kitale
  - Diocese of Lodwar
  - Diocese of Kapsabet

==== Ecclesiastical Province of Mombasa ====
- Archdiocese of Mombasa
  - Diocese of Garissa
  - Diocese of Malindi

==== Ecclesiastical Province of Nairobi ====
- Archdiocese of Nairobi
  - Diocese of Kericho
  - Diocese of Kitui
  - Diocese of Machakos
  - Diocese of Nakuru
  - Diocese of Ngong

==== Ecclesiastical Province of Nyeri ====
- Archdiocese of Nyeri
  - Diocese of Embu
  - Diocese of Maralal
  - Diocese of Marsabit
  - Diocese of Meru
  - Diocese of Muranga
  - Diocese of Nyahururu

=== Episcopal Conference of Lesotho ===
==== Ecclesiastical Province of Maseru ====
- Archdiocese of Maseru
  - Diocese of Mohale’s Hoek
  - Diocese of Qacha’s Nek

=== Episcopal Conference of Liberia ===
==== Ecclesiastical Province of Monrovia ====
- Archdiocese of Monrovia
  - Diocese of Cape Palmas
  - Diocese of Gbarnga

=== Episcopal Conference of Madagascar ===
==== Ecclesiastical Province of Antananarivo ====
- Archdiocese of Antananarivo
  - Diocese of Ambatondrazaka
  - Diocese of Antsirabe
  - Diocese of Miarinarivo
  - Diocese of Moramanga
  - Diocese of Tsiroanomandidy

==== Ecclesiastical Province of Antsiranana ====
- Archdiocese of Antsiranana
  - Diocese of Ambanja
  - Diocese of Fenoarivo Atsinanana
  - Diocese of Mahajanga
  - Diocese of Port-Bergé
  - Diocese of Toamasina

==== Ecclesiastical Province of Fianarantsoa ====
- Archdiocese of Fianarantsoa
  - Diocese of Ambositra
  - Diocese of Farafangana
  - Diocese of Ihosy
  - Diocese of Mananjary

==== Ecclesiastical Province of Toliara ====
- Archdiocese of Toliara
  - Diocese of Morombe
  - Diocese of Morondava
  - Diocese of Tôlagnaro

=== Episcopal Conference of Malawi ===
==== Ecclesiastical Province of Blantyre ====
- Archdiocese of Blantyre
  - Diocese of Chikwawa
  - Diocese of Mangochi
  - Diocese of Zomba

==== Ecclesiastical Province of Lilongwe ====
- Archdiocese of Lilongwe
  - Diocese of Dedza
  - Diocese of Karonga
  - Diocese of Mzuzu

=== Episcopal Conference of Mali ===
==== Ecclesiastical Province of Bamako ====
- Archdiocese of Bamako
  - Diocese of Kayes
  - Diocese of Mopti
  - Diocese of San
  - Diocese of Ségou
  - Diocese of Sikasso

=== Episcopal Conference of Mozambique ===
==== Ecclesiastical Province of Beira ====
- Archdiocese of Beira
  - Diocese of Chimoio
  - Diocese of Gurué
  - Diocese of Quelimane
  - Diocese of Tete

==== Ecclesiastical Province of Maputo ====
- Archdiocese of Maputo
  - Diocese of Inhambane
  - Diocese of Xai-Xai

==== Ecclesiastical Province of Nampula ====
- Archdiocese of Nampula
  - Diocese of Lichinga
  - Diocese of Nacala
  - Diocese of Pemba

=== Episcopal Conference of Namibia ===
==== Ecclesiastical Province of Windhoek ====
- Archdiocese of Windhoek
  - Diocese of Keetmanshoop
  - Vicariate of Rundu

=== Episcopal Conference of Niger ===
==== Ecclesiastical Province of Niamey ====
- Archdiocese of Niamey
  - Diocese of Maradi

=== Episcopal Conference of Nigeria ===
==== Ecclesiastical Province of Abuja ====
- Archdiocese of Abuja
  - Diocese of Idah
  - Diocese of Lafia
  - Diocese of Lokoja
  - Diocese of Makurdi
  - Diocese of Otukpo

==== Ecclesiastical Province of Benin City ====
- Archdiocese of Benin City
  - Diocese of Auchi
  - Diocese of Issele-Uku
  - Diocese of Uromi
  - Diocese of Warri

==== Ecclesiastical Province of Calabar ====
- Archdiocese of Calabar
  - Diocese of Ikot Ekpene
  - Diocese of Ogoja
  - Diocese of Port Harcourt
  - Diocese of Uyo

==== Ecclesiastical Province of Ibadan ====
- Archdiocese of Ibadan
  - Diocese of Ekiti
  - Diocese of Ondo
  - Diocese of Osogbo
  - Diocese of Oyo

==== Ecclesiastical Province of Jos ====
- Archdiocese of Jos
  - Diocese of Bauchi
  - Diocese of Jalingo
  - Diocese of Maiduguri
  - Diocese of Pankshin
  - Diocese of Shendam
  - Diocese of Yola

==== Ecclesiastical Province of Kaduna ====
- Archdiocese of Kaduna
  - Diocese of Ilorin
  - Diocese of Kafanchan
  - Diocese of Kano
  - Diocese of Minna
  - Diocese of Sokoto
  - Diocese of Zaria

==== Ecclesiastical Province of Lagos ====
- Archdiocese of Lagos
  - Diocese of Abeokuta
  - Diocese of Ijebu-Ode

==== Ecclesiastical Province of Onitsha ====
- Archdiocese of Onitsha
  - Diocese of Abakaliki
  - Diocese of Awgu
  - Diocese of Awka
  - Diocese of Enugu
  - Diocese of Nnewi
  - Diocese of Nsukka

==== Ecclesiastical Province of Owerri ====
- Archdiocese of Owerri
  - Diocese of Aba
  - Diocese of Ahiara
  - Diocese of Okigwe
  - Diocese of Orlu
  - Diocese of Umuahia

=== Episcopal Conference of Rwanda ===
==== Ecclesiastical Province of Kigali ====
- Archdiocese of Kigali
  - Diocese of Butare
  - Diocese of Cyangugu
  - Diocese of Gikongoro
  - Diocese of Kabgayi
  - Diocese of Kibungo
  - Diocese of Nyundo
  - Diocese of Ruhengeri

=== Episcopal Conference of Senegal ===
==== Ecclesiastical Province of Dakar ====
- Archdiocese of Dakar
  - Diocese of Kaolack
  - Diocese of Kolda
  - Diocese of Saint-Louis du Sénégal
  - Diocese of Tambacounda
  - Diocese of Thiès
  - Diocese of Ziguinchor

=== Episcopal Conference of Sierra Leone ===
==== Ecclesiastical Province of Freetown and Bo ====
- Archdiocese of Freetown and Bo
  - Diocese of Kenema
  - Diocese of Makeni

=== Episcopal Conference of Southern Africa ===
==== Ecclesiastical Province of Bloemfontein ====
- Archdiocese of Bloemfontein
  - Diocese of Bethlehem
  - Diocese of Keimoes-Upington
  - Diocese of Kimberley
  - Diocese of Kroonstad

==== Ecclesiastical Province of Cape Town ====
- Archdiocese of Cape Town
  - Diocese of Aliwal
  - Diocese of De Aar
  - Diocese of Oudtshoorn
  - Diocese of Port Elizabeth
  - Diocese of Queenstown

==== Ecclesiastical Province of Durban ====
- Archdiocese of Durban
  - Diocese of Dundee
  - Diocese of Eshowe
  - Diocese of Kokstad
  - Diocese of Mariannhill
  - Diocese of Umtata
  - Diocese of Umzimkulu

==== Ecclesiastical Province of Johannesburg ====
- Archdiocese of Johannesburg
  - Diocese of Klerksdorp
  - Diocese of Manzini
  - Diocese of Witbank

==== Ecclesiastical Province of Pretoria ====
- Archdiocese of Pretoria
  - Diocese of Pietersburg
  - Diocese of Rustenburg
  - Diocese of Tzaneen
  - Diocese of Francistown

=== Episcopal Conference of Sudan ===
==== Ecclesiastical Province of Juba ====
- Archdiocese of Juba
  - Diocese of Malakal
  - Diocese of Rumbek
  - Diocese of Tombura-Yambio
  - Diocese of Torit
  - Diocese of Wau
  - Diocese of Yei

==== Ecclesiastical Province of Khartoum ====
- Archdiocese of Khartoum
  - Diocese of El Obeid

=== Episcopal Conference of Tanzania ===
==== Ecclesiastical Province of Arusha ====
- Archdiocese of Arusha
  - Diocese of Mbulu
  - Diocese of Moshi
  - Diocese of Same

==== Ecclesiastical Province of Dar-es-Salaam ====
- Archdiocese of Dar-es-Salaam
  - Diocese of Dodoma
  - Diocese of Ifakara
  - Diocese of Kondoa
  - Diocese of Mahenge
  - Diocese of Morogoro
  - Diocese of Tanga
  - Diocese of Zanzibar

==== Ecclesiastical Province of Mbeya ====
  - Archdiocese of Mbeya
  - Diocese of Iringa
  - Diocese of Sumbawanga

==== Ecclesiastical Province of Mwanza ====
- Archdiocese of Mwanza
  - Diocese of Bukoba
  - Diocese of Bunda
  - Diocese of Geita
  - Diocese of Musoma
  - Diocese of Rulenge
  - Diocese of Shinyanga

==== Ecclesiastical Province of Songea ====
- Archdiocese of Songea
  - Diocese of Lindi
  - Diocese of Mbinga
  - Diocese of Mtwara
  - Diocese of Njombe
  - Diocese of Tunduru-Masasi

==== Ecclesiastical Province of Tabora ====
- Archdiocese of Tabora
  - Diocese of Kahama
  - Diocese of Kigoma
  - Diocese of Mpanda
  - Diocese of Singida

=== Episcopal Conference of Togo ===
==== Ecclesiastical Province of Lomé ====
- Archdiocese of Lomé
  - Diocese of Aného
  - Diocese of Atakpamé
  - Diocese of Dapaong
  - Diocese of Kara
  - Diocese of Kpalimé
  - Diocese of Sokodé

=== Episcopal Conference of Uganda ===
==== Ecclesiastical Province of Gulu ====
- Archdiocese of Gulu
  - Diocese of Arua
  - Diocese of Lira
  - Diocese of Nebbi

==== Ecclesiastical Province of Kampala ====
- Archdiocese of Kampala
  - Diocese of Kasana–Luweero
  - Diocese of Kiyinda–Mityana
  - Diocese of Lugazi
  - Diocese of Masaka

==== Ecclesiastical Province of Mbarara ====
- Archdiocese of Mbarara
  - Diocese of Fort Portal
  - Diocese of Hoima
  - Diocese of Kabale
  - Diocese of Kasese

==== Ecclesiastical Province of Tororo ====
- Archdiocese of Tororo
  - Diocese of Jinja
  - Diocese of Kotido
  - Diocese of Moroto
  - Diocese of Soroti

=== Episcopal Conference of Zambia ===
==== Ecclesiastical Province of Kasama ====
- Archdiocese of Kasama
  - Diocese of Mansa
  - Diocese of Mpika
  - Diocese of Mutare

==== Ecclesiastical Province of Lusaka ====
- Archdiocese of Lusaka
  - Diocese of Chipata
  - Diocese of Kabwe
  - Diocese of Livingstone
  - Diocese of Mongu
  - Diocese of Monze
  - Diocese of Ndola
  - Diocese of Solwezi

=== Episcopal Conference of Zimbabwe ===
==== Ecclesiastical Province of Bulawayo ====
- Archdiocese of Bulawayo
  - Diocese of Gweru
  - Diocese of Hwange
  - Diocese of Masvingo

==== Ecclesiastical Province of Harare ====
- Archdiocese of Harare
  - Diocese of Chinhoyi
  - Diocese of Gokwe
  - Diocese of Mutare
