= Christianity in Benin =

Christianity in the country of Benin is a growing religion, shaped by both a complex colonial history and a variety of local religious innovations. Introduced through early contact with Europeans, the religion formally took hold in the 19th century.

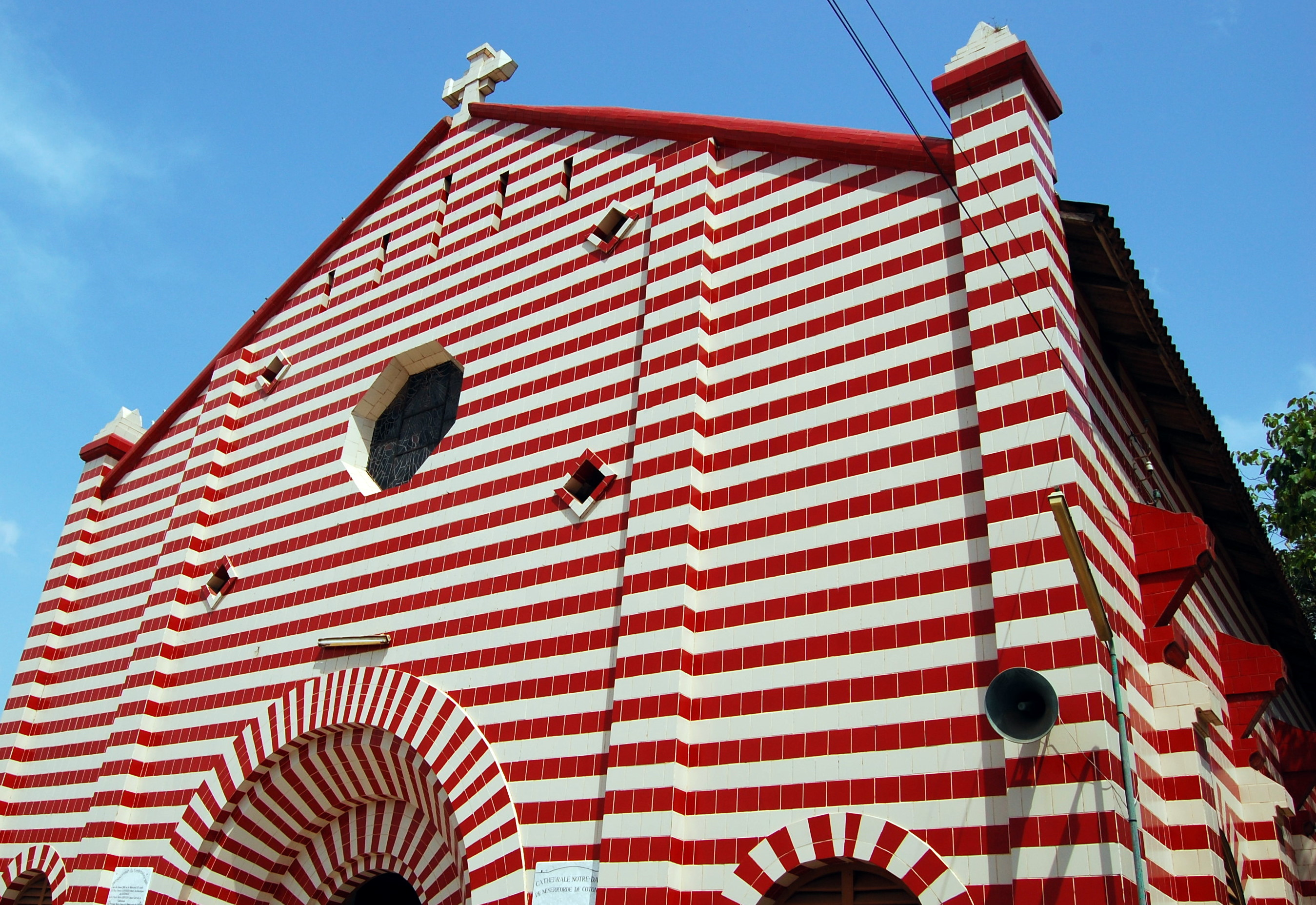
The cathedral of Notre Dame des Apôtres in Cotonou

== Religious Demographics ==
In 2023, more than half of all Christians in Benin were Roman Catholic. According to the 2002 census, 27.1 percent of the population of Benin was Roman Catholic, 5 percent Celestial Christian, 3.2 percent Methodist and 7.5 percent other Christian groups.

As of more recently, with a population of roughly 13.8 million (2022), Christians in Benin constitute approximately 53% of the country's population according to 2010 census data. Growth projections point to a decrease in the population of Christians to 48.5% in 2025. Muslims are the next largest religious population, though specific data on their occupation is largely speculative. The Association of Religious Data Archives estimates roughly 29.13% of the country practices Islam. The remainder of religious practice in the country is split among Judaism, Hinduism, Buddhism, Non-Religionists, and other religions.

Many nominal Christians also practice traditional local religious beliefs.

== History ==
Christianity first reached Benin in 1680, gaining a more permanent footing in the 19th century. English Methodists arrived in 1843, operating amongst the coastal Gun people.

In Benin, like much of Africa, there is vast fragmentation in religious practice across Christianity. The Catholic Church is the oldest reigning form of Christianity in Benin, with roots tracing back to at least the 1861 arrival of Fr. Francesco Borghero and Fr. Francisco Fernandez. Operating primarily in Dahomey (now Benin), these actors were preceded by Spanish and Portuguese traders moving along the Guinea Coast in the 15th century. In 1842, Thomas Birch Freeman of the Wesleyan Methodist Missionary Society also visited the region. Both Borghero and Fernandez belonged to the Society of African Missions, an international society of Catholic constituents serving Africa and people of African descent around the world. Though they were not the first missionaries to arrive in Benin, they were the first organized undertaking of the Catholic Church to create an established presence of Christianity in a region long dominated by the Trans-Atlantic Salve Trade. Moreover, they were some of the earliest well-documented encounters between the people of Dahomey and Christianity. Earlier examples include the Brazilian "retournees" such as the Aguda community in West Africa. Following a period of slavery, they returned to the coast and participated in the diffusion of Christianity and Islam. Often seen as leaders in the dissemination of religion, they helped build the first mosques and churches. The Great Mosque of Porto Novo is an example of Afro-Brazilian influence.

As time passed, Africans began developing local forms of faith and erecting their own independent churches without the support of European missionaries. Specifically in Porto-Novo, early independence was shown by the Methodist Church when the Bodawa and Eledja churches separated in 1901 and 1937, respectively. This would catalyze a religious fervor to define religion within the context of Benin's people rather than as a practice perpetuated by colonists.

More recently established forms of Christianity in the region coincide with the rise of Pentecostalism and a "continent-wide phenomenon of evangelism". Denoted as sects by many Catholics, the newer churches are often opponents of older forms of Christianity in the country. The budding sects include churches like Union des Renaissance d'Homme en Christ, Église Évangélique de la Foi, Parole de Christ au Monde, Témoins de Jéhovah (Jehovah's Witnesses), Union des Églises Évangéliques du Bénin, Église Biblique de La Vie Profonde (Deeper Life Bible Church), Assemblées de Dieu and the Église du Christianisme Céleste (Celestial Church of Christ). Founded in 1947 by Samuel Oschoffa, the Celestial Church of Christ was cited as the largest non-Catholic denomination as of 2008. It started in Porto-Novo, Benin, and is easily recognizable by its blue signs marking churches throughout the country. Church members can be seen, often without shoes, wearing long white robes with women in elaborate white hats.

== Voodoo and Christianity ==
Vodún can be traced to the early Benin kingdom of Dahomey. Today, the practice that focuses on a deep relationship with nature is intertwined with the lives of the country's citizens. Many practicing Christians and Muslims also practice their faith in tandem with traditional rituals and local religions like Vodún.

However, small-scale occurrences of Christian religious persecution by followers of the Vodún faith have been reported. On January 10, 2023, in central Benin, a church was burned down by a group of Vodún followers after the Christians refused to honor local idols.

== Roman Catholicism ==
The Catholic hierarchy in Benin consists of the Archdiocese of Cotonou (including the Dioceses of Abomey, Dassa-Zoumé, Lokossa, Porto Novo) and the Parakou (including the Dioceses of Djougou, Kandi, Natitingou, and N'Dali).

In 2011, it was reported that in Benin, there were 440 priests and 900 men and women in religious orders. By 2020, there were 1349 priests and 1482 nuns.

== See also ==
- Religion in Benin
- Islam in Benin
- Catholic Church in Benin
- Protestant Methodist Church in Benin
- Freedom of religion in Benin
