= Religion in Benin =

Religion in Benin (Pew Research Center, 2020)
1. Christianity (53.2%)
2. Islam (31.4%)
3. Traditional/other (10.5%)
4. None (4.90%)

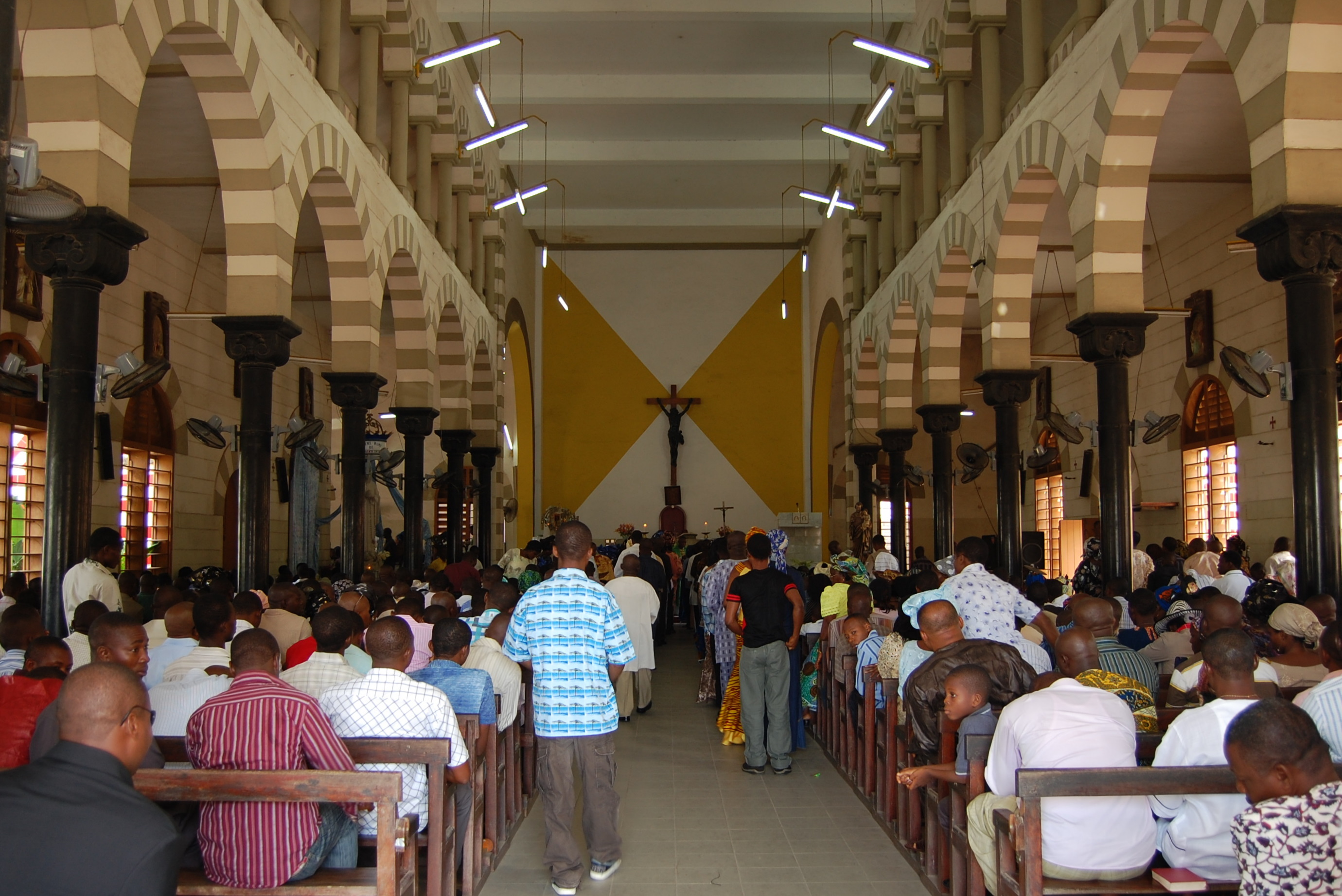
A Christian worship service inside the Cotonou Cathedral.

Christianity is the largest religion in Benin, with substantial populations of Muslims and adherents of traditional faiths such as Vodún.

A 2026 publication by the Pew Research Center estimated the population of Benin was 53% Christian, 31% Muslim, 11% adherent of other religions (including traditional faiths), and 5% had no religion in 2020. The same publication ranked Benin as the eighth most religiously diverse country in the world.

== Overview ==
There are Christians, Muslims, and adherents of African traditional religions throughout the country. However, most adherents of the traditional Yoruba religious group are in the south, while other African Traditional Religion beliefs are followed in the north. Muslims are represented most heavily in the north, while Catholics are prevalent in the south, particularly in Cotonou, the economic capital. It is not unusual for members of the same family to practise Christianity, Islam, African Traditional Religion, or a combination of all of these.

Religious affiliation in Benin (2002–2013)
Religion	2002	2013
Roman Catholic	27.1	25.5
Islam	24.4	27.7
Celestial Church of Christ	5.0	6.7
Methodist	3.2	3.4
Other Christian denominations	7.5	12.9
Vodun	17.3	11.6
Other religious affiliation	15.5	12.2

== Faiths ==
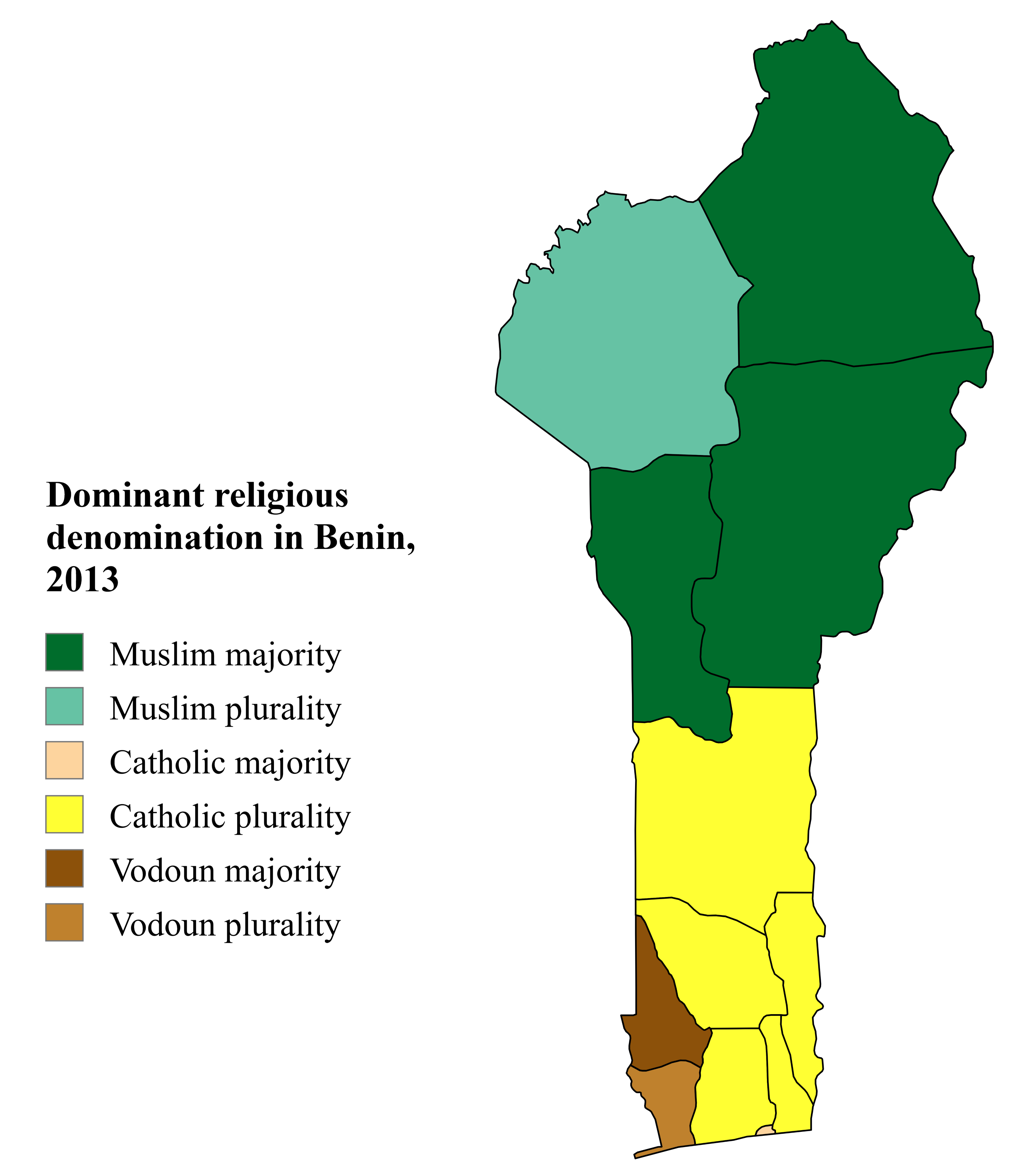
Biggest religion by district in Benin, 2013

=== African traditional religions ===
Among the most practiced African traditional religions in Benin is the Vodun system of belief which originated in this area of Africa.

Other African traditional religions are practiced in the Atakora (Atakora and Donga provinces) and Vodun and Orisha (or Orisa) veneration among the Yoruba and Tado peoples is prevalent in the centre and south of the country. The town of Ouidah on the central coast is the spiritual centre of Beninese Vodun.

The Tado and the Yoruba Orisha pantheons correspond closely:

- The supreme deity Mawu (in the Fon language) or Olodumare (also known as Olorun, Eledumare, Olofin-Orun and Eledaa among other names)(in Yoruba)
- The deity of the earth and smallpox, known as Sakpana (or Sopono, Sakpata), can also be spelt as 'Shakpata, Shopono, Shakpana, and also known as Babalu Aye or Obalu Aye.
- The deity of thunder and lightning, known as Shango; can also be spelt as Sango, also known as Jakuta, Chango, Xevioso and Hevioso.
- The deity of war and iron, known as Ogun, also known as Ogoun or Gu.

=== Christianity ===
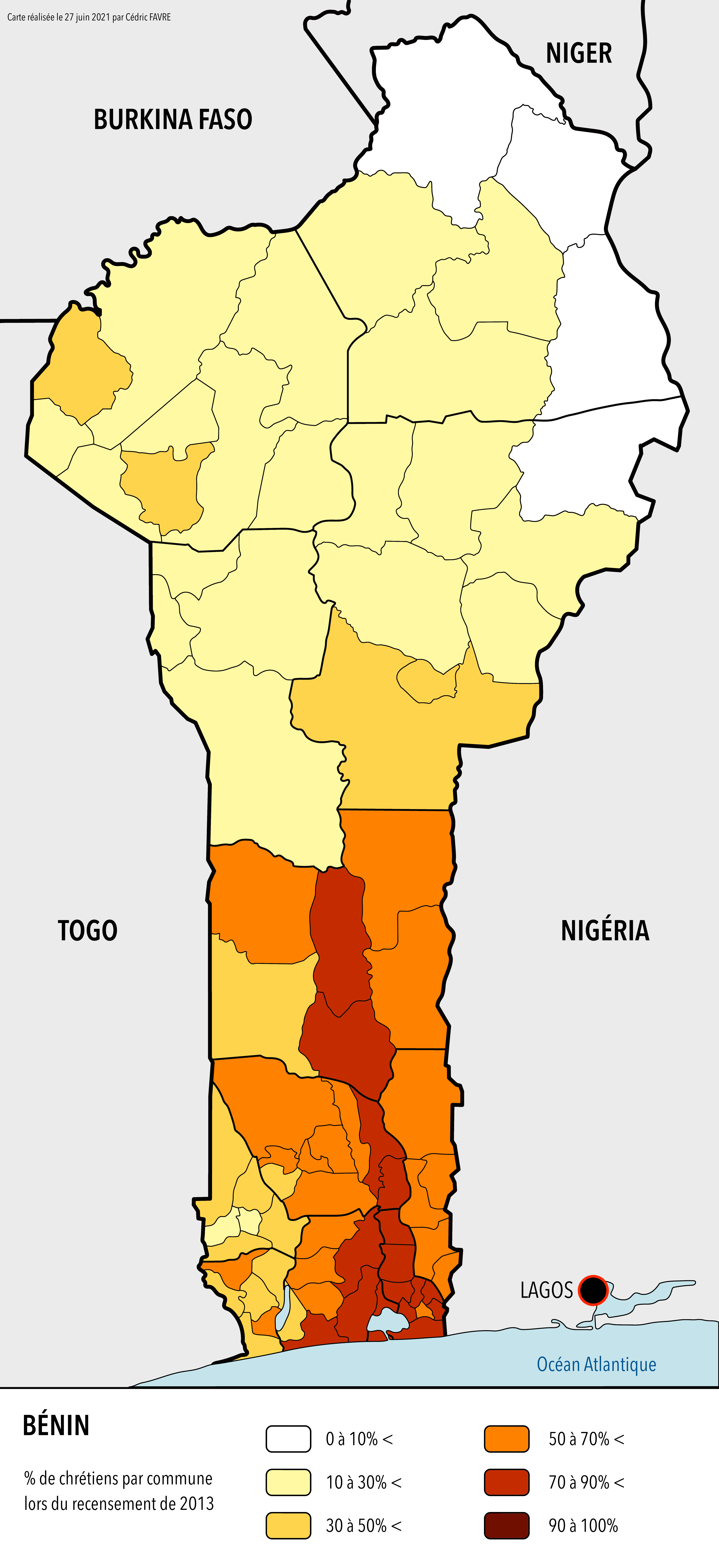
Christianity in Benin by commune

Catholicism first reached Benin in 1680, gaining more permanent footing in the 19th century. English Methodists arrived in 1843, operating amongst the coastal Gun people. French missionaries spread Catholicism in the region.

More than half of all Christians in Benin are Roman Catholic. The Catholic hierarchy in Benin consists of the Archdiocese of Cotonou (including the Dioceses of Abomey, Dassa-Zoumé, Lokossa, Porto Novo) and the Parakou (including the Dioceses of Djougou, Kandi, Natitingou, and N'Dali). In 2020, there were 1349 priests and 1482 women in religious orders.

Other Christian groups include Celestial Christians, Methodists, the Church of Jesus Christ of Latter-day Saints (Mormons), Jehovah's Witnesses, Baptists, Pentecostals, the Unification Church and the Very Holy Church of Jesus Christ of Baname.

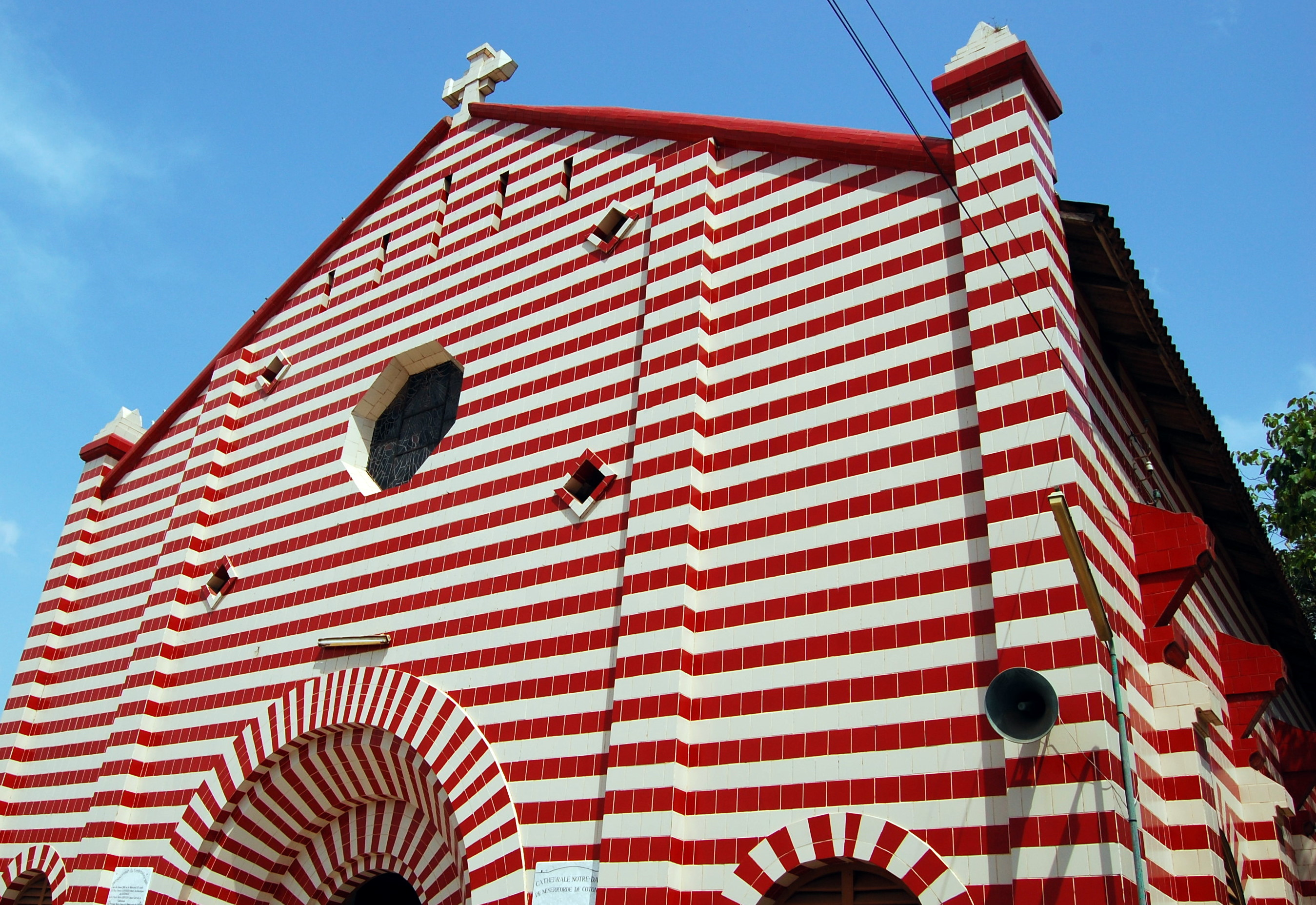
The cathedral of Notre Dame des Apotres in Cotonou

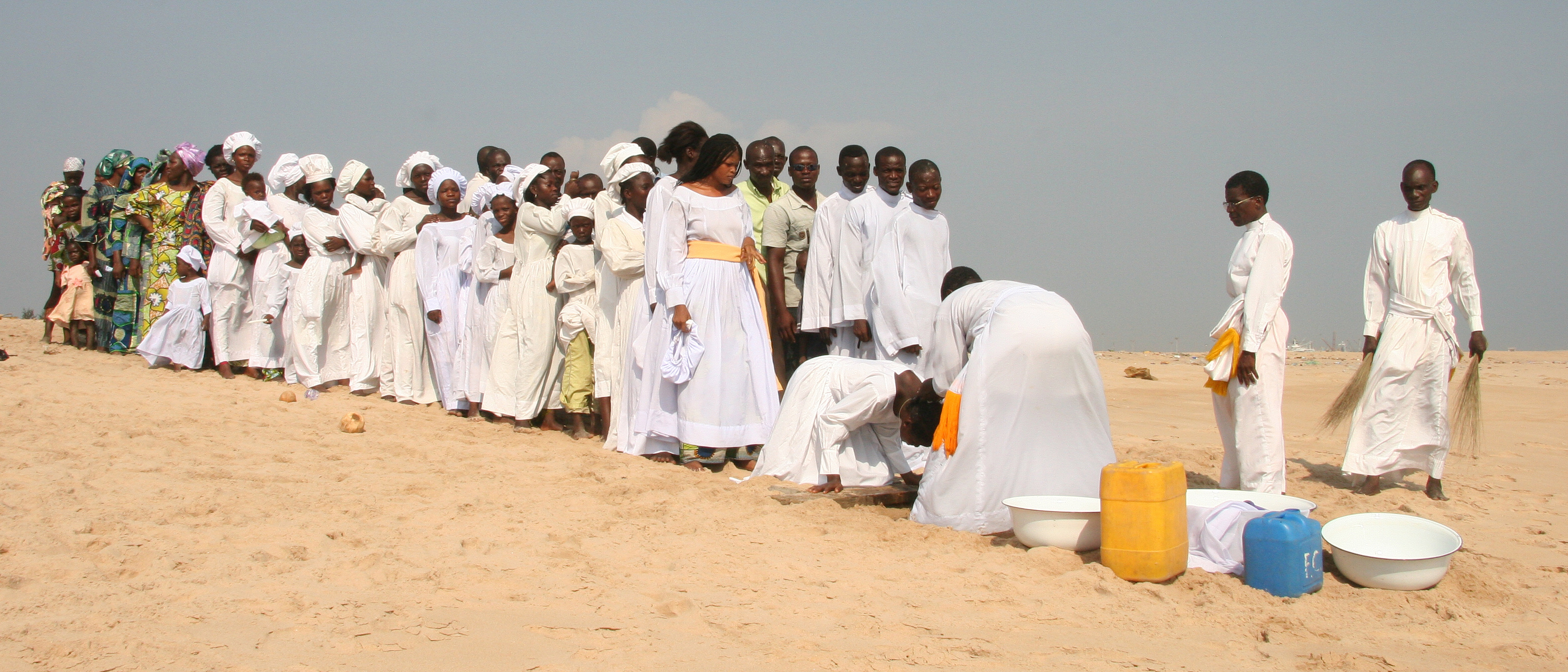
Baptism ceremony of the Celestial Church of Christ in Cotonou, Benin.

=== Islam ===
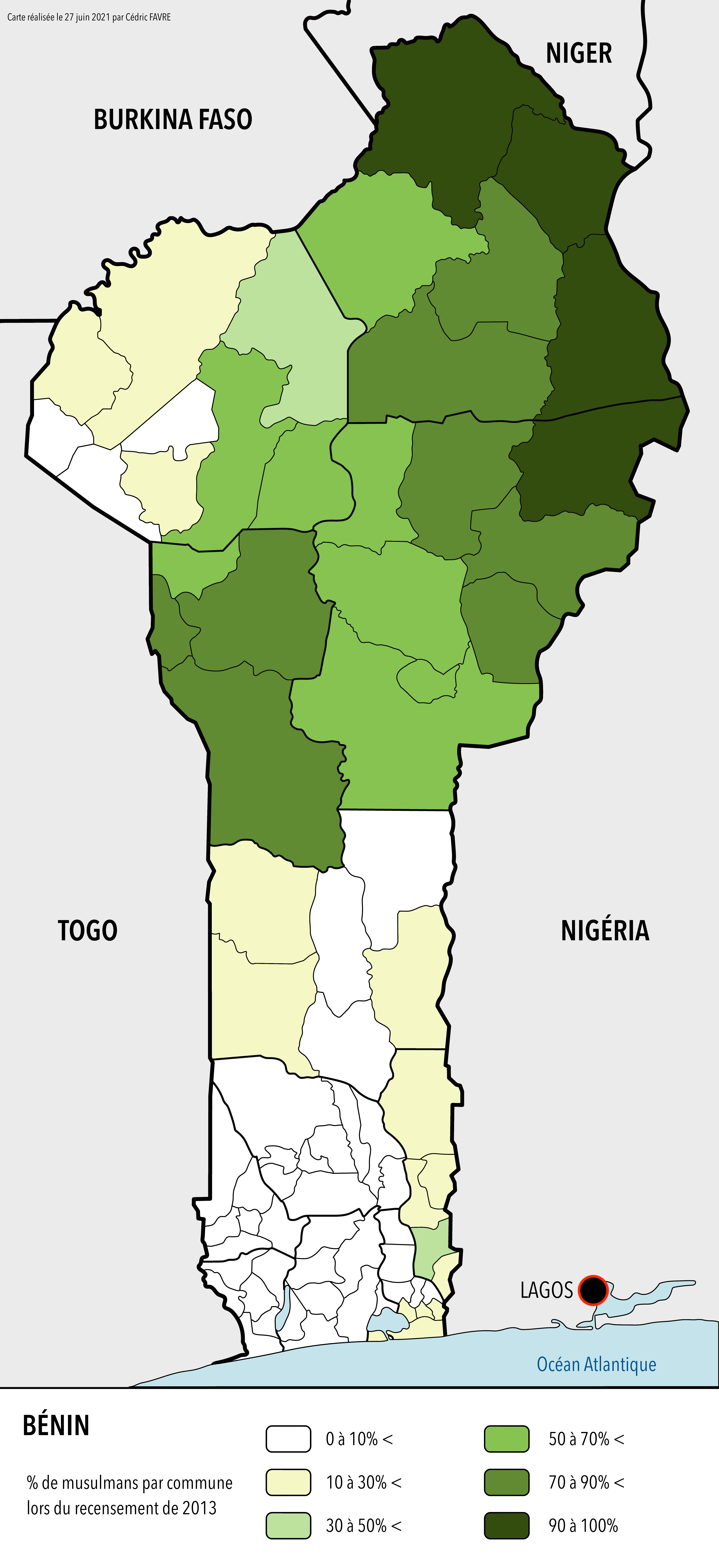
Islam in Benin by commune

Islam, which accounts for more than 27% of the country's population, was brought to Benin from the north by Hausa, and Songhai-Dendi traders. Nearly all Muslims adhere to the Sunni branch of Islam. The few Shi'a Muslims are primarily Middle Eastern expatriates. Shia population in Benin is estimated between one and twelve percent of the total Muslim population of Benin, according to Pew Forum it is less than one percent while as per Ahl al-Bayt World Assembly the population of Shia in Benin is around twelve percent of the total Muslim population of Benin. Ahmadiyya Muslim Community is also present, who recently inaugurated a mosque in Benin, the Al Mahdi Mosque in 2006. Many nominal Muslims also practise traditional local religious beliefs.

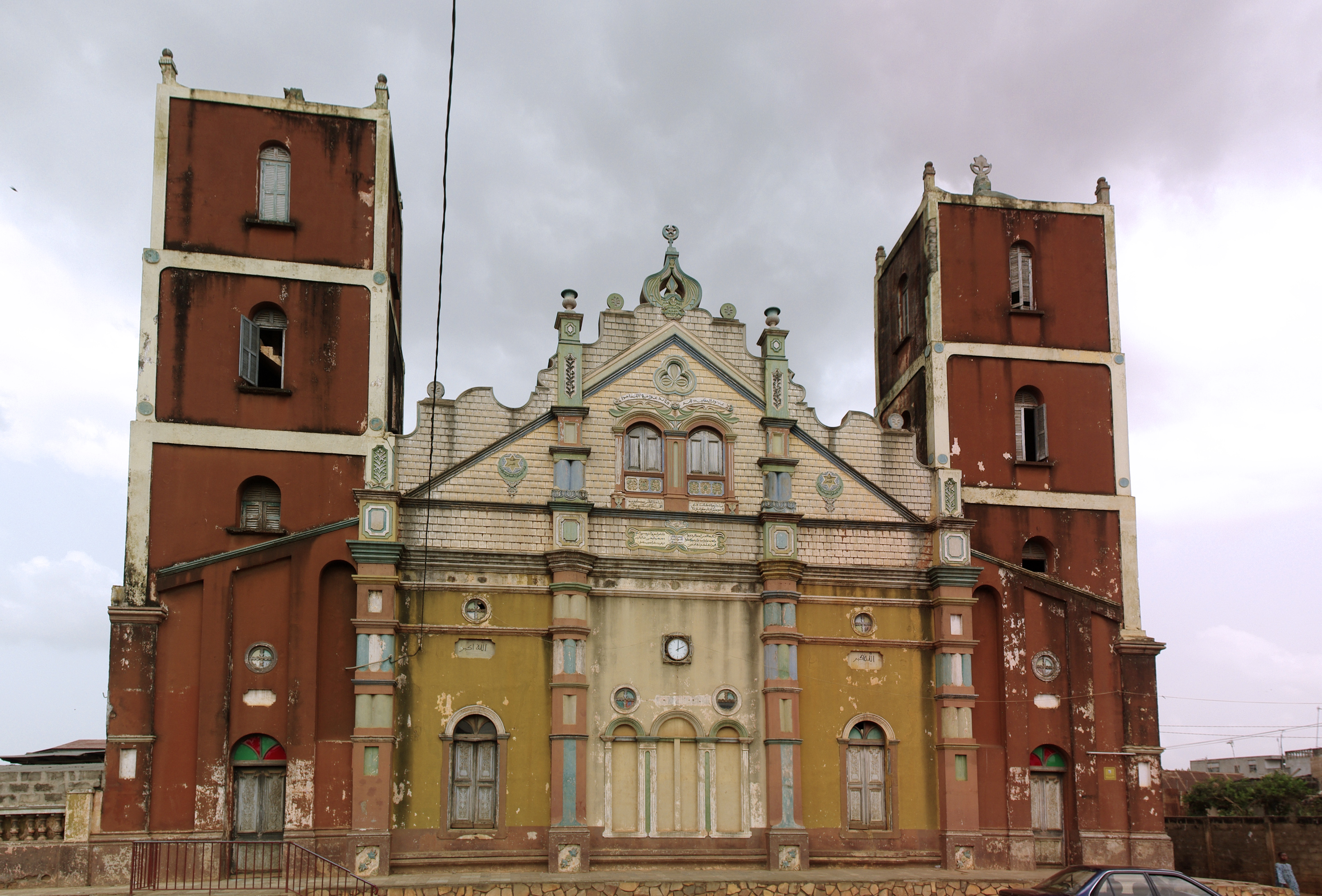
Mosque in Porto-Novo

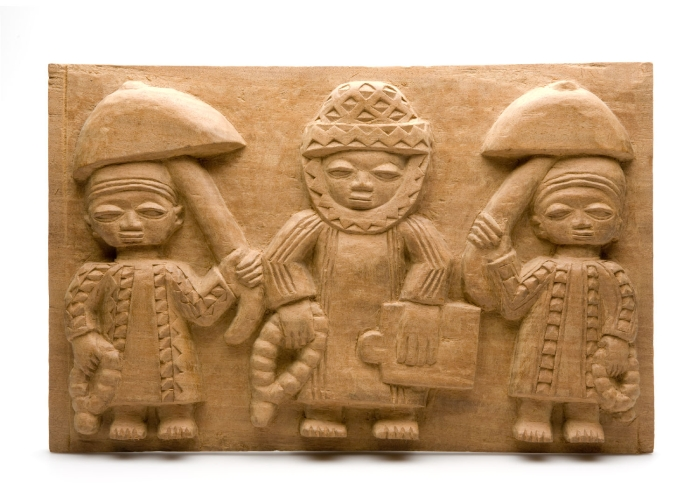
Islamic art in Benin

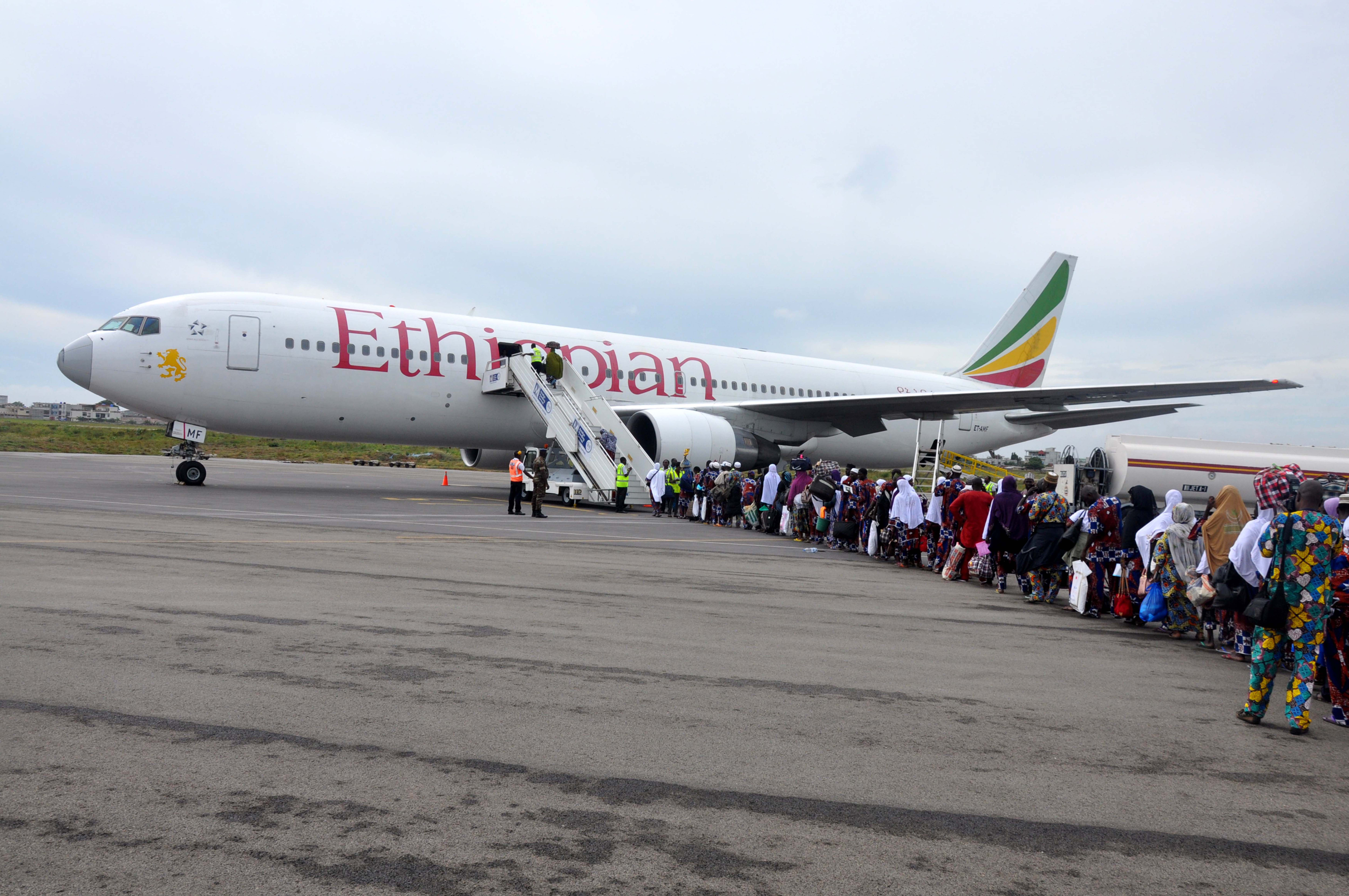
Pilgrims leaving for Mecca

Three out of twelve departments have a Muslim majority: Alibori (81.3%), Donga (77.9%) and Borgou (69.8%). Couffo has the lowest share of Muslims in Benin as Muslims comprise less than 1% of the total population.

According to the Pew Research Center, Muslims had the highest proportional growth in Benin between 2010 and 2020, rising by 7.9 percentage points to become 31.4% of the population.

=== Other groups ===
Other religious groups in Benin include Eckankar and followers of the Baháʼí Faith.

== Freedom of religion ==
The Constitution of Benin provides for freedom of religion, and the government generally respects this right in practice. The United States government recorded no reports of societal abuses or discrimination based on religious belief or practice during 2007, and prominent societal leaders have taken positive steps to promote religious freedom.

In 2023, Benin was scored 4 out of 4 for religious freedom by Freedom House.

== See also ==
- Christianity in Benin
- Catholic Church in Benin
- Protestant Methodist Church in Benin
- Freedom of religion in Benin
