= List of Catholic dioceses in Benin =

The Catholic Church in Benin is composed of two ecclesiastical provinces / archdioceses and eight suffragan dioceses.

== List of dioceses ==
=== Episcopal Conference of Benin ===
==== Ecclesiastical Province of Cotonou ====
- Archdiocese of Cotonou
  - Diocese of Abomey
  - Diocese of Dassa-Zoumé
  - Diocese of Lokossa
  - Diocese of Porto Novo

==== Ecclesiastical Province of Parakou ====
- Archdiocese of Parakou
  - Diocese of Djougou
  - Diocese of Kandi
  - Diocese of Natitingou
  - Diocese of N'Dali
