= Episcopal Conference of Benin =

Assembly of Catholic bishops

The Episcopal Conference of Benin or Bishops' Conference of Benin is the local assembly of bishops is the Episcopal Conference of Benin (French: Conférence épiscopale du Bénin, or CEB).

The CEB is a member of the Regional Episcopal Conference of Francophone West Africa and the Symposium of Episcopal Conferences of Africa and Madagascar (SECAM).

List of presidents:

- 1970–1971: Bernardin Gantin, Archbishop of Cotonou
- 1972–1991: Christophe Adimou, Archbishop of Cotonou
- 1991–1999: Lucien Monsi-Agboka, Bishop of Abomey
- 2001–2006: Nestor Assogba, Archbishop of Cotonou
- 2006–2016: Antoine Ganye, Dassa-Zoumé and Archbishop of Cotonou
- 2016–2023: Victor Agbanou, Bishop of Lokossa
- 2023–present: Roger Houngbédji, Metropolitan Archbishop of Cotonou

The social arm of the Bishops Conference is Caritas Benin, which was founded as "Secours catholique dahoméen" in 1958 and renamed in 1983.

== See also ==
- Catholic Church in Benin
