= Fidèle Agbatchi =

Beninese Roman Catholic archbishop (born 1950)

- Archbishop Emeritus of Parakou
- Church: Catholic Church
- Archdiocese: Archdiocese of Parakou
- In office: 14 April 2000 – 3 November 2010
- Predecessor: Nestor Assogba
- Successor: Pascal N'Koué

Orders
- Ordination: 7 January 1978
- Consecration: 10 June 2000 by Bernardin Gantin

Personal details
- Born: 23 October 1950 (age 75) Savè, Colony of Dahomey and Dependencies, French West Africa, French Empire

Fidèle Agbatchi (born 23 October 1950) is a retired Beninese Roman Catholic archbishop.

He was ordained as a priest on 7 January 1978 and on 10 June 2000 was appointed Archbishop of Parakou, and was ordained on 14 April 2004 beginning his term. He served the Roman Catholic Archdiocese of Parakou from his seat in St. Paul Cathedral in Parakou. On 4 November 2010, his resignation as Archbishop of Parakou was accepted by Pope Benedict XVI in accordance with Canon 401, Paragraph 2, of the Code of Canon Law.
