= Protestant Methodist Church in Benin =

Coordinates: 6°28′N 2°36′E

The Protestant Methodist Church in Benin was founded by Methodist missionary and colonial official in West Africa, Thomas Birch Freeman in 1843. He was sent by the Methodist Missionary Society in London. Freeman was the son of a freed slave.

The Methodist Church in Benin is organised into 15 synods, and covers the whole country. There are around 90,000 members in 420 congregations and 72 ordained pastors.

In 2023 the president is The Revd Dr Kponjesu Amos Hounsa. He is based on Cotonou.

== See also ==
- Religion in Benin
- Christianity in Benin
- Catholic Church in Benin
- Islam in Benin
- Freedom of religion in Benin
