= Sts. Peter and Paul Cathedral, Parakou =

Catholic cathedral church in Benin

Sts. Peter and Paul Cathedral
- Cathédrale Saints Pierre et Paul de Parakou
- Sts. Peter and Paul Cathedral
- 9.3406°N 2.6230°E
- Location: Parakou
- Country: Benin
- Denomination: Catholic Church
- Sui iuris church: Latin Church
- Tradition: Roman Rite

Administration
- Archdiocese: Parakou

The Sts. Peter and Paul Cathedral (French: Cathédrale Saints Pierre et Paul de Parakou) also simply called Cathedral of Parakou, is a Catholic cathedral church in Parakou, in the Borgou Department in the north part of the African country of Benin.

Its history dates back to 1944 when the parish church of St. Peter and St. Paul opened (L'église paroissiale Saints Pierre et Paul) created by the Society of African Missions and became its first pastor Father Roger Barthelemy, but it was only formally blessed in 1958. it was elevated to cathedral in 1964 when the diocese was created.

It has a baroque style and some stained glass depicting scenes of the Apostles Peter and Paul. It serves as the headquarters of the archbisop of the Archdiocese of Parakou, which was created in 1997 by Pope John Paul II by the bull "Successoris Petri".

== See also ==
- Catholic Church in Benin
- Sts. Peter and Paul Cathedral
