= Caritas Benin =

Catholic social welfare and development organisation in Benin

- Caritas Bénin
- Established: 1958; 68 years ago
- Type: Nonprofit
- Purpose: social welfare, social justice
- Location: Djeffa village, Sèmè-Podji, Benin
- Origins: Catholic Social Teaching
- Region served: Benin
- Services: social services, development, humanitarian aid
- Official language: French
- President: Bishop Aristide Gonsallo
- Affiliations: Caritas Internationalis, Caritas Africa
- Budget: 978,749,504 XOF (2022)
- Staff: 243 (2022)
- Website: www.caritasbenin.org
- Formerly called: Secours catholique dahoméen

Caritas Benin (French: Caritas Bénin) is a not-for-profit social welfare, development and humanitarian relief organisation of the Catholic Church in Benin. It is a member of both Caritas Africa and Caritas Internationalis.

== History ==
Following the establishment of Caritas organisations in many other countries, the local bishops of what was then the French colony of Dahomey founded "Secours Catholique Dahoméen" in 1958. Six years after the country's independence, in December 1964, the organisation was officially registered as a non-governmental organisation by the Ministry of the Interior. In 1983, the organisation adopted its current name, Caritas Benin.

In 2008, the government signed a framework partnership agreement with Caritas Benin and recognised it as public utility organisation in November 2014, by decree N°2014-696.

== Structure ==
Caritas Benin serves as the national office for a countrywide network of diocesan Caritas organisations. These diocesan offices are:

- Caritas Abomey
- Caritas Dassa-Zoumé
- Caritas Développement Djougou
- Caritas Kandi
- Caritas Lokossa
- Caritas N'dali
- Caritas Natitingou
- Caritas BDBD Parakou
- Caritas Porto-Novo
- Service de la Charité pour le Développement Intégral de l'Homme (SCDIH; Caritas Cotonou)

Caritas Benin reports on the activities of the entire network to both the Episcopal Conference of Benin and the Government of Benin, from which it derives its legal status as a non-governmental organisation. This status allows it to implement development and humanitarian projects across the country for the benefit of all people, regardless of social status or religious affiliation.

The board is chaired by Aristide Gonsallo, the Bishop of Porto-Novo. The highest governing body is the General Assembly, composed of the board members and three representatives from each diocesan Caritas.

== Work ==
Caritas Benin is active in four main areas. In the field of social services, it provides support to disadvantaged individuals by facilitating access to healthcare and education, while also offering assistance to elderly persons, persons with disabilities, and those living in extreme poverty. The organisation also carries out long-term development initiatives aimed at improving living conditions across the country. These include programmes focused on agriculture and food security, environmental protection, the provision of clean water in rural areas, the empowerment of women, and access to renewable energy.

In addition to its social and developmental work, Caritas Benin engages in humanitarian relief efforts in response to both localised and larger-scale emergencies. This includes assistance following incidents such as house fires, as well as broader crises like floods or socio-political instability. The organisation also played a key role in responding to the COVID-19 pandemic in Benin.

Finally, Caritas Benin is involved in advocacy efforts on a range of issues. Drawing on its national presence and community ties, it promotes peacebuilding, social cohesion, and conflict prevention, particularly before, during, and after elections, as well as on other matters of public concern.

In 2022, the Caritas Benin network supported 310,755 children by providing food, education, healthcare, and psychological assistance. Additionally, 955 individuals experiencing poverty received targeted support, and 2,319 women were empowered to move towards financial independence through the Savings and Internal Lending Communities approach. The organisation also drilled 18 boreholes to improve access to clean water.
