= Paul Kouassivi Vieira =

Beninese Roman Catholic bishop (1949–2019)

- Bishop of Djougou
- Church: Catholic Church
- Diocese: Diocese of Djougou
- In office: 10 June 1995 – 21 March 2019
- Predecessor: Diocese erected
- Successor: Bernard de Clairvaux Toha Wontacien

Orders
- Ordination: 29 June 1975 by Pope Paul VI
- Consecration: 1 October 1995 by Bernardin Gantin

Personal details
- Born: 14 July 1949 Agoué, Colony of Dahomey and Dependencies, French West Africa, French Empire
- Died: 21 March 2019 (aged 69) Rome, Italy

Paul Kouassivi Vieira (14 July 1949 – 21 March 2019) was a Beninese Roman Catholic bishop.

Vieira was born in Benin and was ordained to the priesthood in 1975. He served as bishop of the Roman Catholic Diocese of Djougou, Benin, from 1996 until his death in 2019.
