= Basilique de l'Immaculée Conception =

Basilica in Ouidah, Benin

Coordinates: 6.360652°N 2.084734°E

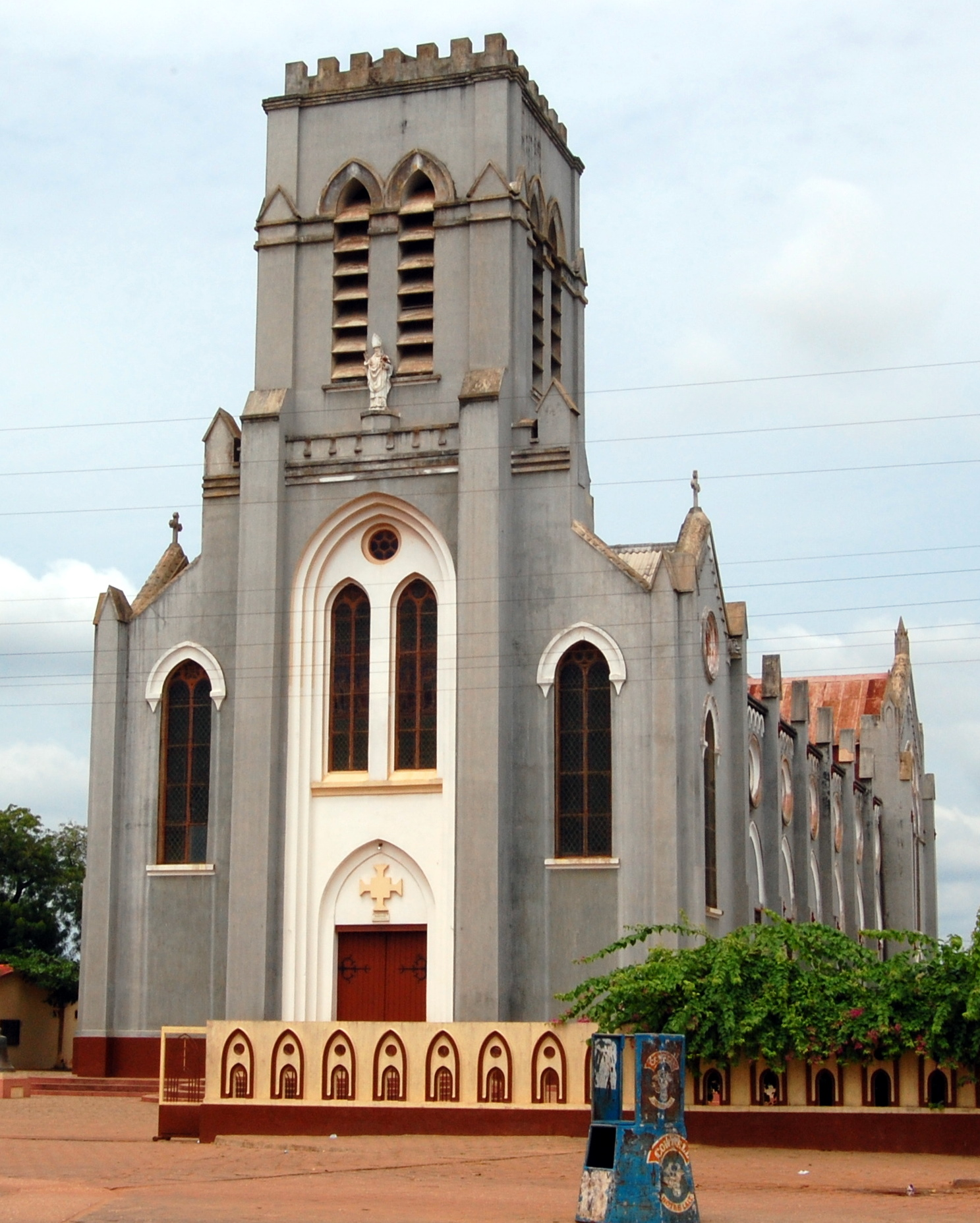
Basilique de l'Immaculée Conception

The Basilique de l'Immaculée Conception (French pronunciation: [bazilik də lim(m)akyle kɔ̃sɛpsjɔ̃]; lit. 'Basilica of the Immaculate Conception') is a Catholic minor basilica dedicated to the Immaculate Conception located in Ouidah, Benin. The basilica is in the Latin Church Archdiocese of Cotonou. The basilica was dedicated on November 9, 1989.
