= List of Catholic dioceses in Angola =

The Catholic Church in Angola is composed of five ecclesiastical provinces and 15 suffragan dioceses.

== List of dioceses ==
Ecclesiastical Jurisdictions	Latin name	Type	Rite	Ecclesiastical Province	Established	Area (km^{2})
Benguela	Benguelensis	Diocese	Roman	Huambo	6 June 1970	49,920
Cabinda	Cabindanus	Diocese	Roman	Luanda	2 July 1984	7,120
Caxito	Caxitonsis	Diocese	Roman	Luanda	6 June 2007	25,133
Dundo	Dundensis	Diocese	Roman	Luanda	9 November 2001	103,130
Ganda		Diocese	Roman	Huambo	1 August 2024	24,447
Huambo	Huambensis	Metropolitan Archdiocese	Roman	Huambo	4 September 1940	29,500
Kwito-Bié	Kvitobiensis	Diocese	Roman	Huambo	4 September 1940	71,000
Luanda	Luandensis	Metropolitan Archdiocese	Roman	Luanda	1596	1,074
Lubango	Lubangensis	Metropolitan Archdiocese	Roman	Lubango	27 July 1955	118,000
Lwena	Lvenanus	Diocese	Roman	Saurimo	1 July 1963	199,786
Malanje	Malaniensis	Metropolitan Archdiocese	Roman	Malanje	25 November 1957	107,000
Mbanza Congo	Mbanzacongensis	Diocese	Roman	Luanda	7 November 1984	39,459
Menongue	Menonguensis	Diocese	Roman	Lubango	10 August 1975	213,309
Namibe	Namibanus	Diocese	Roman	Lubango	21 March 2009	57,097
Ndalatando	Ndalatandensis	Diocese	Roman	Malanje	26 March 1990	20,159
Ondjiva	Ondiivanus	Diocese	Roman	Lubango	10 August 1975	83,900
Saurímo	Saurimoënsis	Metropolitan Archdiocese	Roman	Saurímo	10 August 1975	77,000
Sumbe	Sumbensis	Diocese	Roman	Luanda	10 August 1975	60,000
Uíje	Uiiensis	Diocese	Roman	Luanda	14 March 1967	63,530
Viana	Viananensis	Diocese	Roman	Luanda	6 June 2007	17,206

== See also ==
- List of Roman Catholic dioceses in Africa
