= Lucien Monsi-Agboka =

- Bishop of Abomey
- Church: Catholic Church
- Diocese: Diocese of Abomey
- In office: 5 April 1963 – 25 November 2002
- Predecessor: Diocese erected
- Successor: René-Marie Ehuzu

Orders
- Ordination: 21 December 1957
- Consecration: 21 July 1963 by Bernardin Gantin

Personal details
- Born: 3 June 1926 Cotonou, Colony of Dahomey and Dependencies, French West Africa, French Empire
- Died: 27 April 2008 (aged 81)

Lucien Monsi-Agboka (3 June 1926 − 27 April 2008) was a Beninese Roman Catholic bishop.

Ordained to the priesthood in 1957, Monsi-Agboka was named bishop of Roman Catholic Diocese of Abomey, Benin in 1963 and retired in 2002.
