= Catholic Church in Benin =

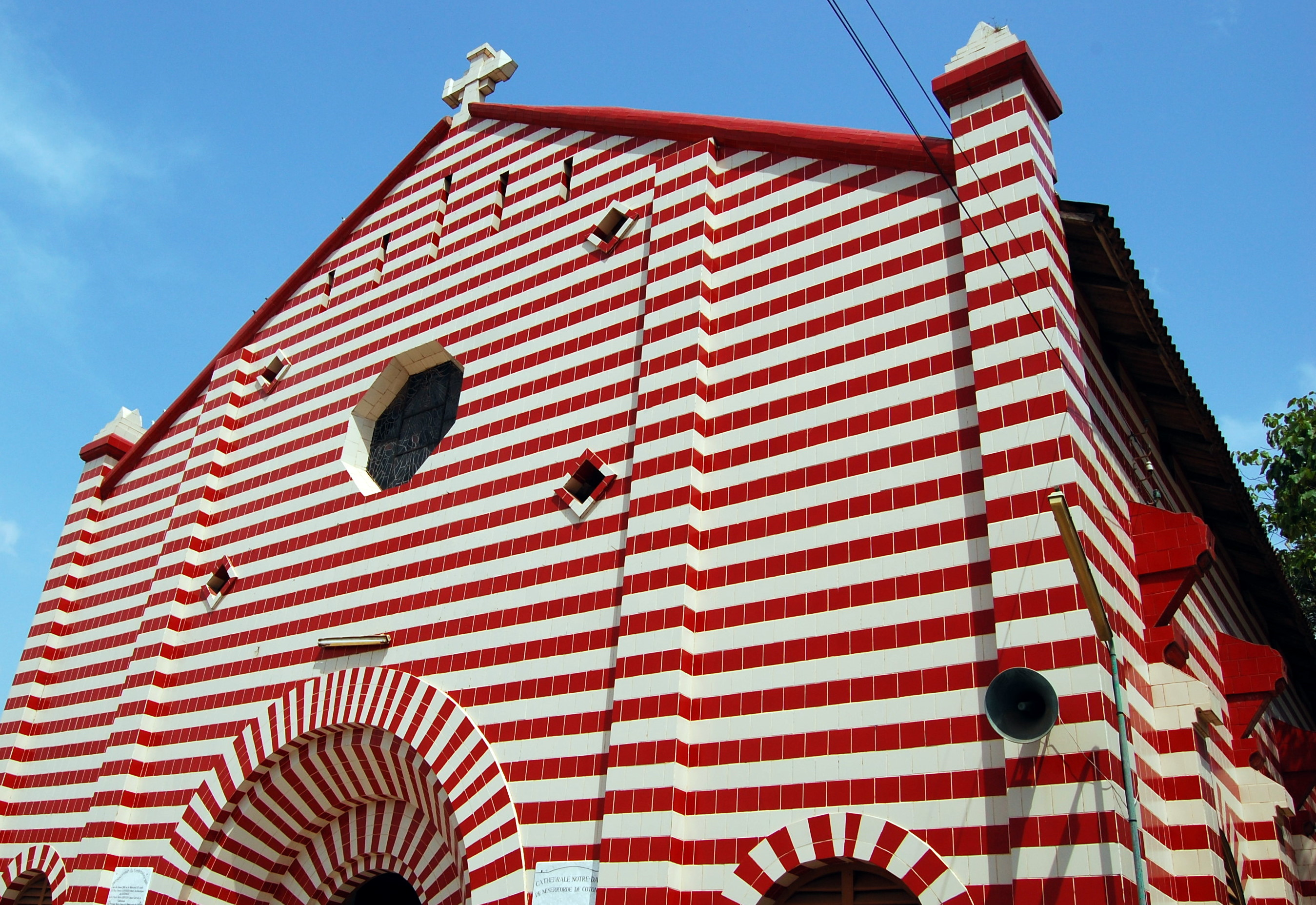
The Notre Dame de Miséricorde cathedral, commonly known as the Cotonou Cathedral in Cotonou

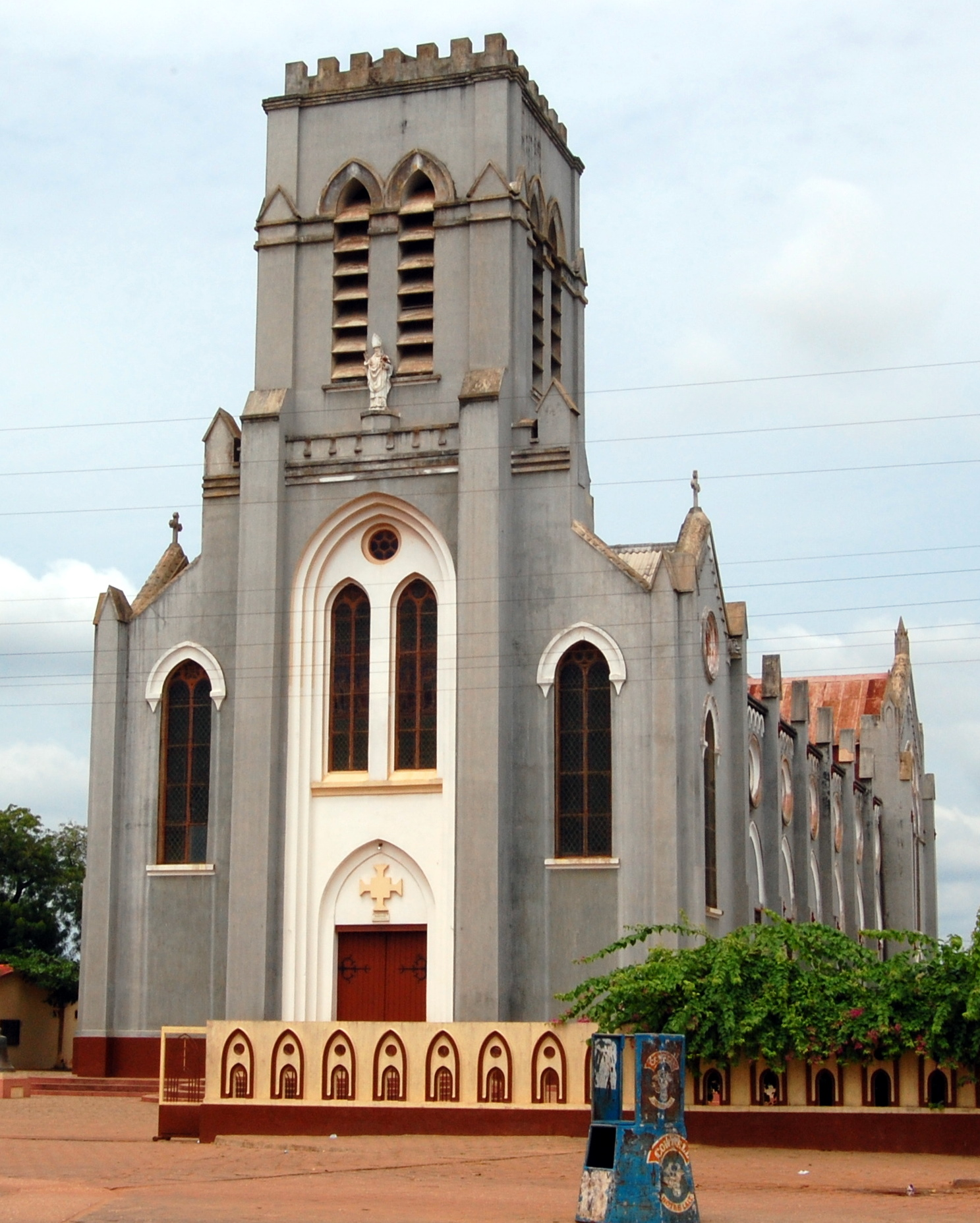
Basilica of Ouidah.

The Catholic Church in Benin is part of the worldwide Catholic Church, under the spiritual leadership of the Pope.

In 2023, more than half of all Christians in the Republic of Benin are Catholic.

In 2020, there were an estimated 3.9 million baptised Catholics in Benin, or about 32% of the population, in ten dioceses and archdioceses. There were 1349 priests and 1482 nuns.

== Description and history ==
The origin of the Catholic Church in Benin dates back to the effort of Irish and French missionaries of the Society of African Missions (SMA) to plant the seed of Catholicism in West Africa. The first venture by SMA to establish an African Mission in West Africa began in 1858 under the leadership of a Lyon based father, Melchior Joseph de Marion Bresillac. A member of the Paris Foreign Missions Society, Bresillac had spent time in India and his desire for the new society was to spread the church and train Africans as priests to continue the work of the mission. The proposal was originally opposed by Pope Pius IX but with Bresillac's determination, the propaganda prefect approved the mission.

When the mission's objective was granted in 1856, Dahomey was chosen as location. In November 1858, when the first group of missionaries sailed for West Africa, the location was changed to Sierra Leone as Dahomey was considered too dangerous. The missionaries consisted of two French fathers, Reymond and Bresson and one Brother. The missionaries arrived in January 1859.

The news of their safe arrival reached Bresillac and in March, Bresillac and two other missionaries sailed for West Africa. Bresillac arrived Freetown in May 1859 but his expedition ended in gloom; Reymond and Bresillac died weeks after his arrival. Bresillac's assistant in Lyon, Augustin Planque took his position as Superior General, but unlike Bresillac, Planque stayed in Europe to provide support for the mission and to ensure credibility of the mission in the eyes of the pope.

A third missionary expedition was approved, the superior of the mission was an Italian priest, Father Francesco Borghero. In 1860, Father Borghero traveled to Africa to start new a mission in Dahomey. The missions' first location was at Whydah, the second Church was in Porto-Novo and in 1868, the third location was Lagos. West Africa was treacherous for the missionaries, one out of four died as a result of malaria or Yellow Fever

In 1870, the name of the Dahomey mission became Apostolic Vicariate of Bight of Benin. The land was severe for the missionaries and the conditions of operations was not helped by the Franco-Prussian War which affected SMA's supplies and communication to West Africa. Then in 1883, Dahomey was carved out of the Bight of Benin Vicariate and Lagos became the headquarters of the Vicariate of Bight of Benin.

The mission of Dahomey was separated from Benin in 1883 and made a Prefecture Apostolic, and then in 1901 a Vicariate Apostolic. On 13 May 1948, the name of the Vicariate Apostolic of Dahomey was changed to Vicariate Apostolic of Ouidah and the Prefecture Apostolic of Parakou was erected from part of the Prefecture Apostolic of Niamey's territory. The elevation of the Vicariate Apostolic of Ouidah soon followed, and it became the Archdiocese of Cotonou in 1955. The Prefecture Apostolic of Parakou was elevated and became the Diocese of Parakou in 1964 and then the Archdiocese of Parakou in 1997.

In 1958, the local bishops decided to establish the "Secours Catholique Dahoméen" as the social arm of the Church. It was renamed to Caritas Benin in 1983.

The Catholic Church in Benin gave one of its most esteemed bishops, Archbishop Bernardin Gantin of Cotonou, to the Roman Curia as Cardinal Prefect of the Sacred Congregation for Bishops and as Dean of the Sacred College of Cardinals. He worked closely and was a personal friend of both Pope John Paul II, who brought him to Rome, and Benedict XVI, who spoke of him when he visited his tomb in Ouidah, Benin in November 2011, as part of a visit to that country.

Archbishop Mark Miles was appointed Apostolic Nuncio to Benin and Togo in 2021.

Within Benin the hierarchy consists of:

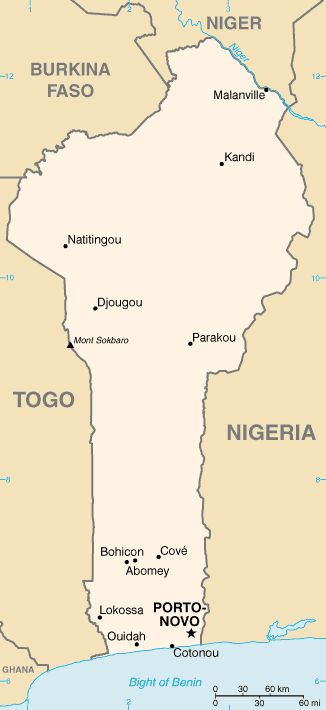
Map of Benin

- Cotonou
  - Abomey
  - Dassa-Zoumé
  - Lokossa
  - Porto-Novo
- Parakou
  - Djougou
  - Kandi
  - Natitingou
  - N'Dali

== See also ==
- Catholic Church by country
- Christianity in Benin
- Episcopal Conference of Benin
- Freedom of religion in Benin
- Islam in Benin
- Protestant Methodist Church in Benin
- Religion in Benin
