= Nestor Assogba =

Beninese Roman Catholic archbishop

- Archbishop of Cotonou
- Church: Catholic Church
- Archdiocese: Archdiocese of Cotonou
- In office: 29 October 1999 – 5 March 2005
- Predecessor: Isidore de Souza
- Successor: Marcel Honorat Léon Agboton
- Previous posts: Archbishop of Parakou (1997-1999); Bishop of Parakou (1976-1997)

Orders
- Ordination: 21 December 1957
- Consecration: 25 July 1976 by Bernardin Gantin

Personal details
- Born: 21 February 1929 Abomey, Colony of Dahomey and Dependencies, French West Africa, French Empire
- Died: 22 August 2017 (aged 88) Bohicon, Zou Department, Benin

Nestor Assogba (21 February 1929 – 22 August 2017) was a Catholic archbishop from Benin.

Assogba was born in Abomey. He was ordained as a priest on 21 December 1957 and appointed Bishop of Parakou on 10 April 1976. He was ordained on 25 July that year. He served as Archbishop of Parakou from 16 October 1997 until 29 October 1999, when he was appointed Archbishop of Cotonou. He served in Cotonou for 5 1/2 years before retiring from service on 5 March 2005.
