= Freedom of religion in Benin =

The Constitution provides for freedom of religion, and the Government generally respected this right in practice. There were no reports of societal abuses or discrimination based on religious belief or practice, and prominent societal leaders took positive steps to promote religious freedom.

== Religious demography ==
According to the 2002 census, 27.1 percent of the population is Roman Catholic, 24.4 percent Muslim, 17.3 percent Vodun, 5 percent Celestial Christian, 3.2 percent Methodist, 7.5 percent other Christian, 6 percent other traditional local religious groups, 1.9 percent other religious groups, and 6.5 percent claim no religious affiliation.

Foreign missionary groups operate freely in the country.

In 2020, the population of Benin was 52.2% Christian, 24.6% Muslim, 17.9% Animist and 5.3% following other faiths or none.

== Status of religious freedom ==
=== Legal and policy framework ===
The Constitution provides for freedom of religion, and the Government generally respected this right in practice. The Government at all levels sought to protect this right in full and did not tolerate its abuse, either by governmental or private actors. There is no state-sponsored religion.

The Constitutional Court determines the legal guidelines that govern religious practice. In recent years this court determined that it is illegal to block the access of any group to its religious services and that criticism of religious belief is a protected free speech right.

The Defense Ministry is permitted to intervene in conflicts between religious groups as a peacekeeping force to ensure public order and social peace, provided that the intervention complies with the principle of state neutrality in the management of religious affairs.

Persons who wish to form a religious group must register with the Ministry of the Interior. Registration requirements are the same for all religious groups, and there were no reports that any group was refused permission to register or subjected to unusual delays or obstacles in the registration process. Religious groups are free from taxation.

Government officials accorded respect to prominent leaders of all religious groups by attending their induction ceremonies, funerals, and other religious celebrations. The President regularly received leaders of all religious groups, and police forces were assigned to provide security to any religious event upon request.

In accordance with article 2 of the Constitution, which provides for a secular state, public schools are not authorized to provide religious instruction. Religious groups are permitted to establish private schools.

National holidays include the Christian holy days of Easter Monday, Ascension Day, Whit Monday, Assumption Day, All Saints' Day, and Christmas; the Islamic holy days of Ramadan, Tabaski, and the Birthday of Muhammad; and the indigenous celebration of Traditional Religions holiday. State-operated television featured coverage of the celebration of religious holidays and special events in the lives of prominent religious leaders, including ordination anniversaries and funerals.

Soon after his inauguration, the President received leaders and representatives of Christian, Muslim, and traditional indigenous religious groups, respectively.

Ecumenical Day is celebrated every first Wednesday of May and traditionally includes a large celebration of interreligious cooperation in the historic town of Ouidah. Individual religious leaders make an effort to bridge the divide between Christians and Muslims and preach a message of tolerance.

=== Restrictions on religious freedom ===
Government policy and practice contributed to the generally free practice of religion. There were no reports of religious prisoners or detainees in the country. There were no reports of forced religious conversion.

== Societal abuses and discrimination ==
There were no reports of societal abuses or discrimination based on religious belief or practice. Due to the diversity of religious affiliations within families and communities, religious tolerance was widespread at all levels of society and in all regions. Interfaith dialogue occurred regularly, and citizens respected different religious traditions and practices, including syncretistic beliefs. Many Vodun followers were also Christian or Muslim and tolerant of other religious groups.

== 2020s ==
In 2023, Benin was scored 4 out of 4 for religious freedom.

== See also ==
- Religion in Benin
- Christianity in Benin
- Catholic Church in Benin
- Islam in Benin
