= Archdiocese of Parakou =

Catholic archdiocese in Benin

Coordinates: 9°20′58″N 2°37′00″E

Archdiocese of Parakou Archidioecesis Parakuensis Archidiocèse de Parakou

Catholic
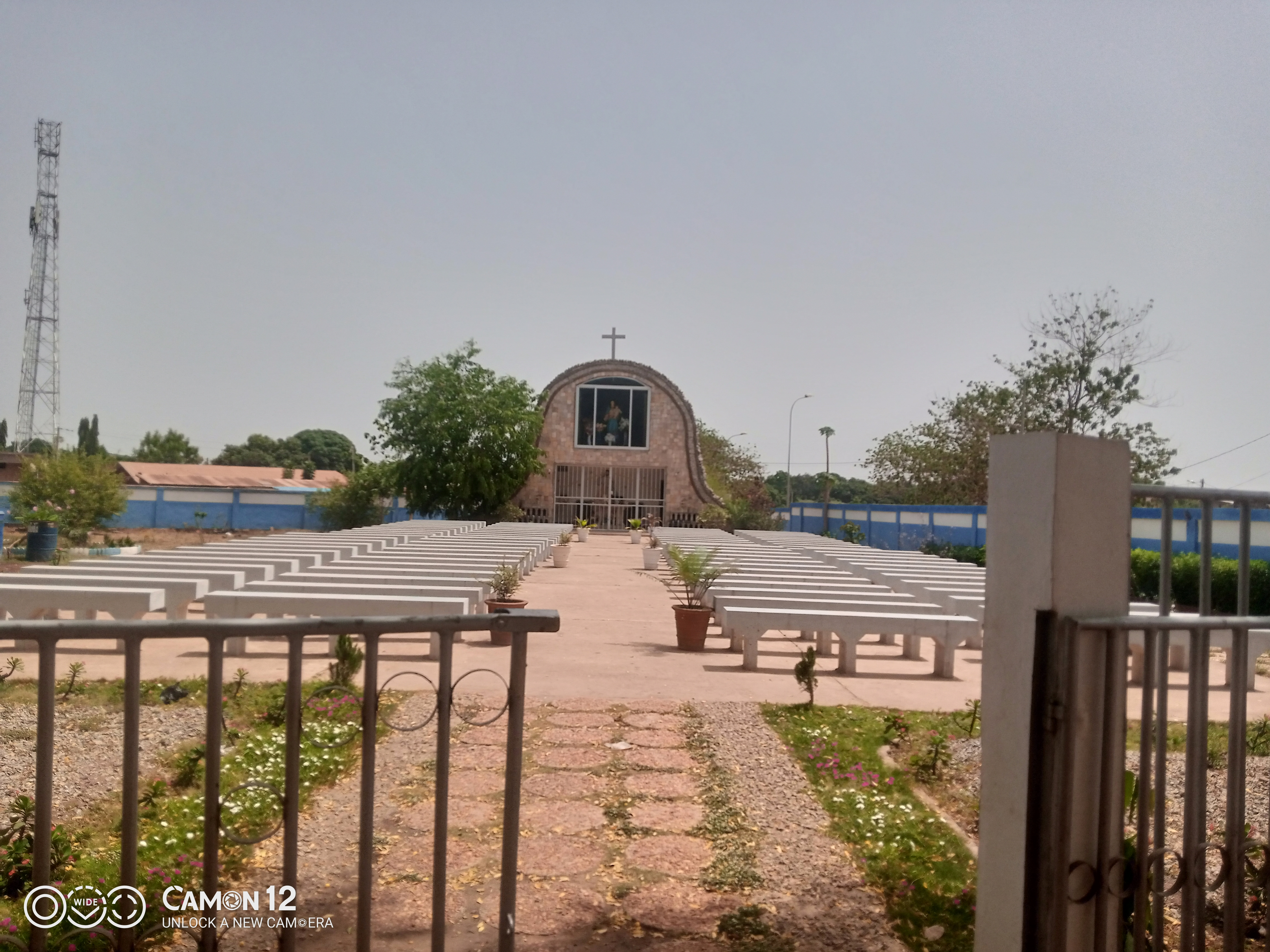
- MV Cathédrale Saints-Pierre-et-Paul de Parakou

Location
- Country: Benin
- Episcopal conference: Episcopal Conference of Benin
- Ecclesiastical province: Parakou
- Headquarters: Parakou, Borgou Department, Benin

Statistics
- Area: 9,259 km^{2} (3,575 sq mi)
- Population: Total; Catholics: (as of 2023); 535,690; 124,932 (23.3%)
- Parishes: 32

Information
- Denomination: Catholic Church
- Sui iuris church: Latin Church
- Rite: Roman Rite
- Established: 13 May 1948; 78 years ago
- Cathedral: Sts. Peter and Paul Cathedral, Parakou
- Secular priests: 77 total; 53 diocesan; 24 religious

Current leadership
- Pope: Leo XIV
- Metropolitan Archbishop: Pascal N'Koué
- Bishops emeritus: Fidèle Agbatchi

The Archdiocese of Parakou (Latin: Archidioecesis Parakuensis) is the Metropolitan See for the ecclesiastical province of Parakou in Benin.

Caritas BDBD Parakou is the social arm of the diocese.

== History ==
- 13 May 1948: Established as Apostolic Prefecture of Parakou from the Apostolic Prefecture of Niamey, Niger
- 10 February 1964: Promoted as Diocese of Parakou
- 16 October 1997: Promoted as Metropolitan Archdiocese of Parakou

== Special churches ==
The seat of the archbishop is Cathédrale Saints Pierre et Paul in Parakou.

== Ordinaries ==
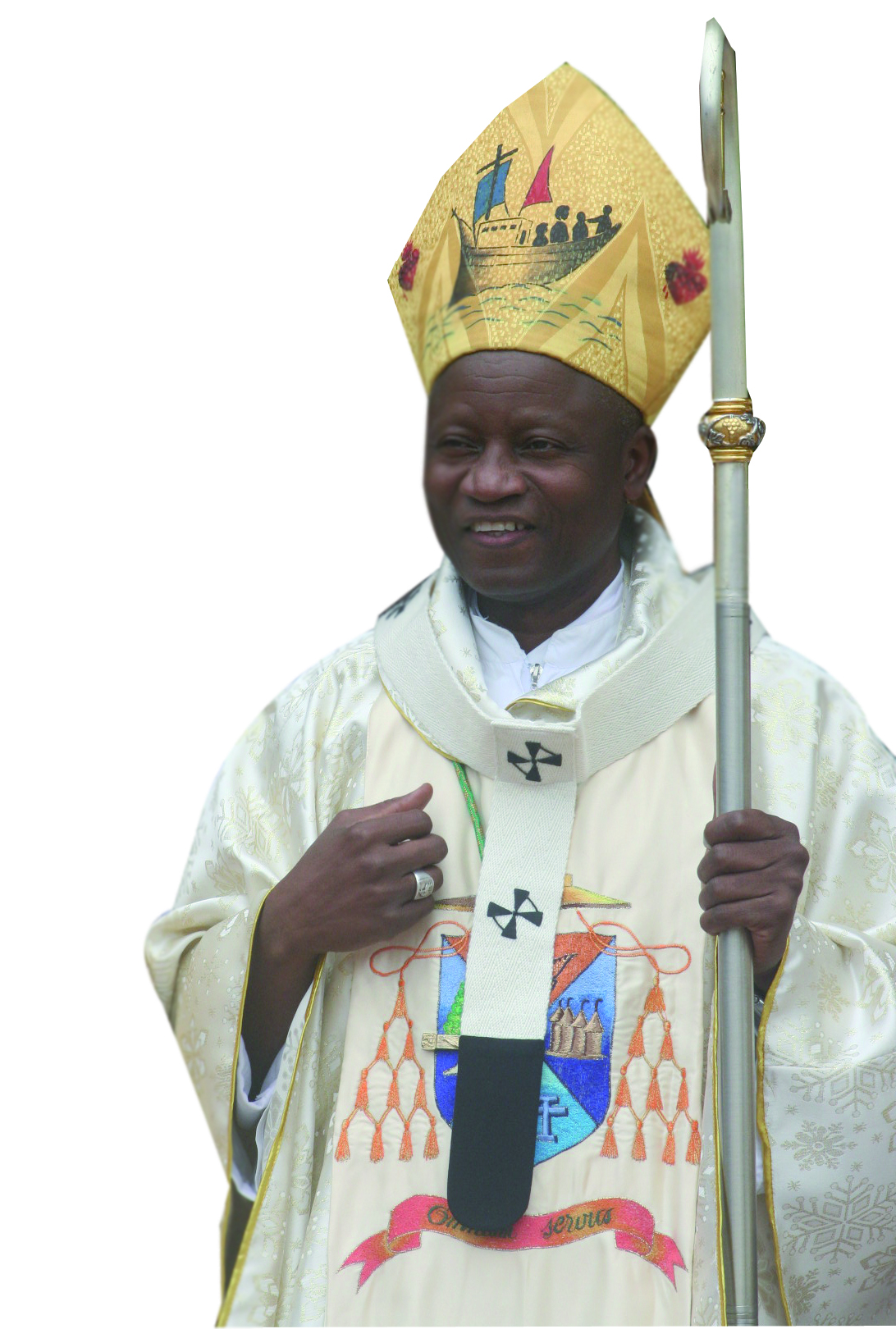
Archbishop Pascal N'Koué (2011)

=== Prefects of Parakou ===
- François Faroud, S.M.A. (21 May 1948 – 23 December 1955), resigned
- Robert Chopard-Lallier, S.M.A. (4 January 1957 – 13 February 1962), resigned
- André van den Bronk, S.M.A. (13 February 1962 – 10 February 1964 see below)

=== Bishops of Parakou ===
- André van den Bronk, S.M.A. (see above 10 February 1964 – 29 September 1975), resigned
  - Apostolic Administrator Patient Redois, S.M.A. (29 September 1975 – 25 July 1976), Bishop of Natitingou
- Nestor Assogba (10 April 1976 – 16 October 1997 see below)

=== Archbishops of Parakou ===
- Nestor Assogba (see above 16 October 1997 – 29 October 1999), appointed Archbishop of Cotonou
- Fidèle Agbatchi (14 April 2000 – 3 November 2010), resigned
- Pascal N'Koué (14 June 2011 – Present)

=== Other priests of this diocese who became bishops ===
- Clet Fèliho (1979-2000), appointed Bishop of Kandi in 2000
- Aristide Gonsallo (1992-2015), appointed Bishop of Porto Novo in 2015

== Suffragan dioceses ==
- Djougou
- Kandi
- N’Dali
- Natitingou

== See also ==
- Catholic Church in Benin
- List of Roman Catholic dioceses in Benin
