= Diocese of Dassa-Zoumé =

Latin Catholic diocese in Benin

Diocese of Dassa–Zoumé Dioecesis Dassana–Zumensis

Catholic

Location
- Country: Benin
- Territory: Collines
- Episcopal conference: Episcopal Conference of Benin
- Ecclesiastical province: Archdiocese of Cotonou
- Metropolitan: Archdiocese of Cotonou
- Coordinates: 7°44′59″N 2°11′04″E

Statistics
- Area: 13,931 km^{2} (5,379 sq mi)
- Population: Total; Catholics: (as of 2023); 719,477; 479,979 (66.7%)
- Parishes: 48

Information
- Denomination: Catholic Church
- Sui iuris church: Latin Church
- Rite: Roman Rite
- Established: June 10, 1995; 30 years ago
- Cathedral: Cathédrale Notre-Dame de Fourvière de Dassa-Zoumé
- Secular priests: 83 (total); 75 (diocesan); 8 (religious orders)

Current leadership
- Pope: Leo XIV
- Bishop: François Gnonhossou
- Metropolitan Archbishop: Roger Houngbédji

Map
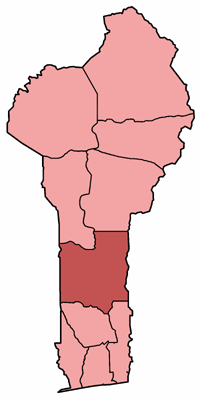
- Map of Benin highlighting the territory of the diocese, which includes the entirety of the Collines Department

The Diocese of Dassa–Zoumé (Latin: Dioecesis Dassana–Zumensis) is a Latin Church diocese of the Catholic Church located in the city of Dassa-Zoumé in the ecclesiastical province of Cotonou in Benin.

Caritas Dassa is the social arm of the diocese.

== History ==
On June 10, 1995, the Diocese of Dassa-Zoumé was established with territory taken from the Diocese of Abomey, including the Collines Department communes of Dassa-Zoumé, Bantè, Savalou, Savè, Glazoué, and Ouèssè.

== Leadership ==
Ordinaries (bishops and apostolic administrators) of Dassa-Zoumé:

- Bishop Antoine Ganyé (June 10, 1995 – August 21, 2010); appointed Archbishop of Cotonou
- Archbishop Antoine Ganyé (Apostolic Administrator: October 2011 – August 15, 2013)
- Fr. Benoît Gbemavo Goudote (Apostolic Administrator: August 15, 2013 – February 12, 2015)
- Bishop François Gnonhossou, SMA (February 12, 2015 – )

== See also ==
- Catholic Church in Benin
- List of Catholic dioceses in Benin
