= Diocese of Djougou =

Roman Catholic diocese in Benin

Coordinates: 9°42′N 1°40′E

Diocese of Djougou Dioecesis Diuguensis Diocèse de Djougou

Location
- Country: Benin
- Metropolitan: Archdiocese of Parakou
- Headquarters: Djougou, Donga Department, Benin

Statistics
- Area: 11,126 km^{2} (4,296 sq mi)
- Population: Total; Catholics: (as of 2023); 629,027; 74,294 (10.7%)
- Parishes: 23

Information
- Denomination: Catholic Church
- Sui iuris church: Latin Church
- Rite: Roman Rite
- Established: 10 June 1995; 31 years ago
- Cathedral: Cathédrale du Sacré-Cœur de Djougou

Current leadership
- Pope: Leo XIV
- Bishop: Bernard de Clairvaux Toha Wontacien, O.S.F.S.
- Metropolitan Archbishop: Pascal N'Koué

The Roman Catholic Diocese of Djougou (Latin: Dioecesis Diuguensis) is a diocese located in the city of Djougou in the ecclesiastical province of Cotonou in Benin.

== History ==
- 10 June 1995: Established as Diocese of Djougou from the Diocese of Natitingou
- October 1995: Caritas Développement Djougou was established as the social arm of the diocese.

== Leadership ==
Bishops of Djougou (Roman rite)

- Paul Kouassivi Vieira (10 June 1995 – 21 March 2019)
  - Apostolic Administrator Pascal N'Koué (3 April 2019 – 2 April 2022), Archbishop of Parakou
- Bernard de Clairvaux Toha Wontacien, O.S.F.S. (12 February 2022 – Present)

== See also ==
- Roman Catholicism in Benin
