= Diocese of Lokossa =

Roman Catholic diocese in Benin

Coordinates: 6°38′N 1°43′E

Diocese of Lokossa Dioecesis Lokossaensis Diocèse de Lokossa

Location
- Country: Benin
- Metropolitan: Archdiocese of Cotonou
- Headquarters: Lokossa, Mono Department, Benin

Statistics
- Area: 4,009 km^{2} (1,548 sq mi)
- Population: Total; Catholics: (as of 2023); 1,645,320; 200,180 (12.2%)
- Parishes: 60

Information
- Denomination: Catholic Church
- Sui iuris church: Latin Church
- Rite: Roman Rite
- Established: 11 March 1968; 58 years ago
- Secular priests: 117 (115 Diocesan, 2 Religious Orders)

Current leadership
- Pope: Leo XIV
- Bishop: Coffi Roger Anoumou
- Metropolitan Archbishop: Roger Houngbédji, O.P.
- Bishops emeritus: Victor Agbanou

Map
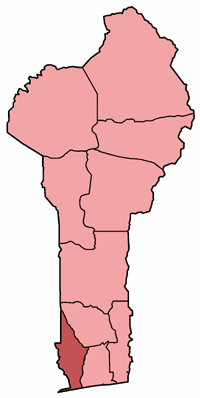

The Roman Catholic Diocese of Lokossa (Latin: Dioecesis Lokossaënsis) is a diocese located in the city of Lokossa in the ecclesiastical province of Cotonou in Benin.

== History ==
- 11 March 1968: Established as Diocese of Lokossa from the Metropolitan Archdiocese of Cotonou.
- 1970: Establishment of Caritas Lokossa as the social arm of the diocese.

== Leadership ==
=== Bishops of Lokossa ===
- Christophe Adimou (11 March 1968 – 28 June 1971), appointed Archbishop of Cotonou
- Robert Sastre (2 March 1972 – 16 January 2000)
- Victor Agbanou (5 July 2000 – 4 March 2023), retired
- Coffi Roger Anoumou (4 March 2023 – Present)

=== Another priest of this diocese who became bishop ===
- Paul Kouassivi Vieira (1975-1995), appointed Bishop of Djougou in 1995

== See also ==
- Roman Catholicism in Benin
