= Diocese of N'Dali =

Roman Catholic diocese in Benin

Coordinates: 9°52′N 2°43′E

Diocese of N'Dali Dioecesis Ndaliensis Diocèse de N'Dali

Location
- Country: Benin
- Metropolitan: Archdiocese of Parakou
- Headquarters: N'Dali, Borgou Department, Benin

Statistics
- Area: 21,650 km^{2} (8,360 sq mi)
- Population: Total; Catholics: (as of 2023); 619,405; 140,450 (22.7%)
- Parishes: 15

Information
- Denomination: Catholic Church
- Sui iuris church: Latin Church
- Rite: Roman Rite
- Established: 22 December 1999; 26 years ago
- Secular priests: 28 (9 Diocesan, 19 Religious Orders)

Current leadership
- Pope: Leo XIV
- Bishop: Martin Adjou-Moumouni
- Metropolitan Archbishop: Pascal N'Koué

The Roman Catholic Diocese of N’Dali (Latin: Dioecesis Ndaliensis) is a diocese located in the city of N’Dali in the ecclesiastical province of Parakou in Benin.

Caritas N'Dali is the social arm of the diocese.

== History ==
- 22 December 1999: Established as Diocese of N’Dali from the Metropolitan Archdiocese of Parakou

== Leadership ==
Bishop of N’Dali (Roman rite)

- Martin Adjou-Moumouni (22 December 1999 – Present)

== See also ==
- Roman Catholicism in Benin
