= Archdiocese of Cotonou =

Catholic archdiocese in Benin

Archdiocese of Cotonou Archidioecesis Cotonuensis French: Archidiocese de Cotonou

catholic
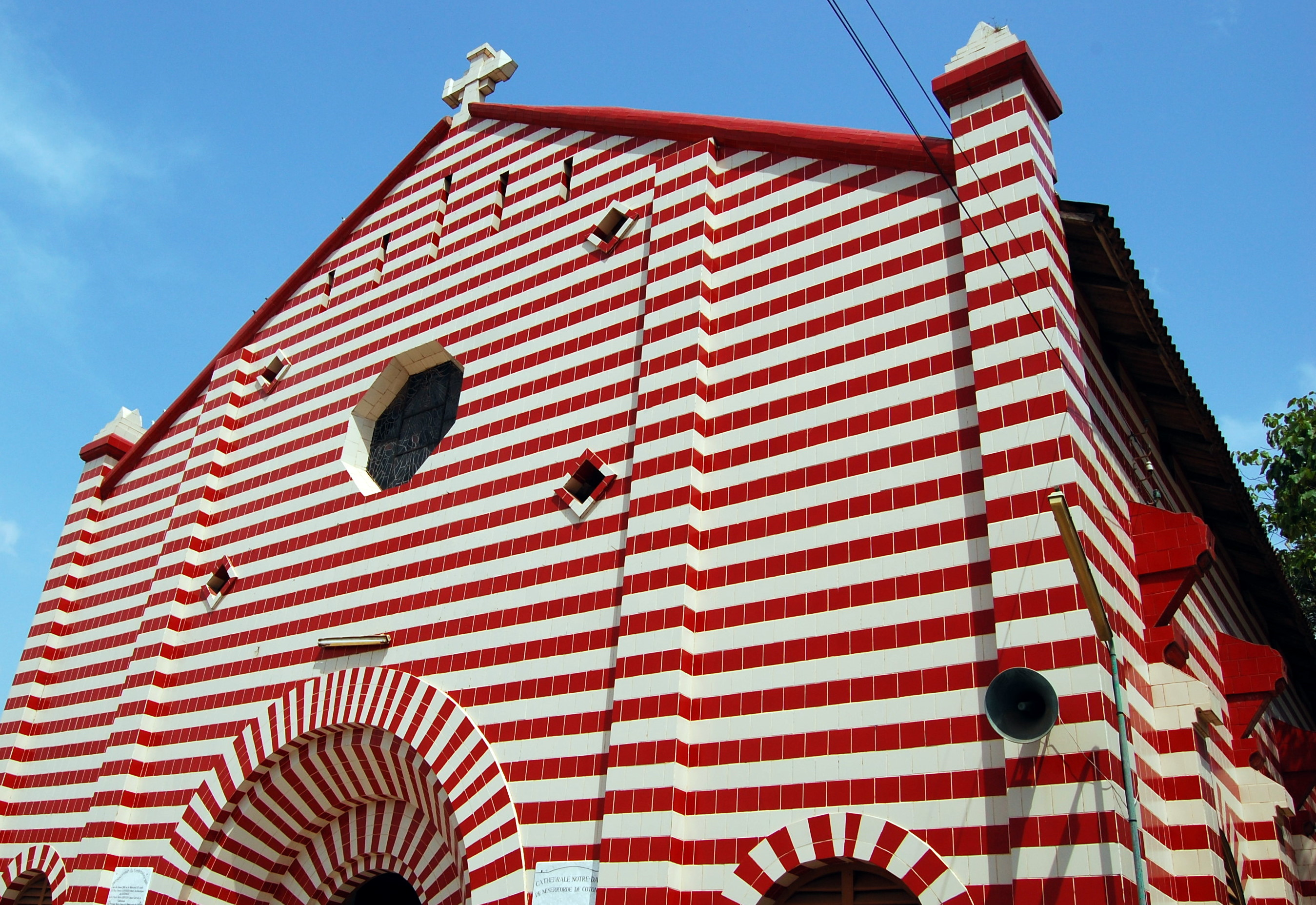
- Cathedral of Notre Dame de Miséricorde (Our Lady of Mercy)

Location
- Country: Benin
- Territory: Atlantique Department and Littoral Department
- Episcopal conference: Episcopal Conference of Benin
- Ecclesiastical province: Cotonou
- Coordinates: 6°21′23″N 2°26′21″E

Statistics
- Population: Total; Catholics: (as of 2021); 2,160,650 (Note: Annuario Pontificio (2021) via Catholic-Hierarchy.org); 920,997 (42.6%)
- Parishes: 111

Information
- Denomination: Catholic Church
- Sui iuris church: Latin Church
- Rite: Roman Rite
- Established: 14 September 1955; 70 years ago
- Cathedral: Notre-Dame-de-Miséricorde
- Secular priests: 354
- Language: French

Current leadership
- Pope: Leo XIV
- Archbishop: Roger Houngbédji
- Bishops emeritus: Antoine Ganyé

Website
- archidiocesedecotonou.org (in French)

The Archdiocese of Cotonou (Latin: Archidioecesis Cotonuensis) is the Latin Church archdiocese of the Catholic Church in Cotonou in Benin. It is the metropolitan see of the ecclesiastical province of Cotonou.

== History ==
- 26 June 1883: Established as Apostolic Prefecture of Dahomey from the Apostolic Vicariate of Benin Coast, Nigeria.
- 25 May 1901: Promoted as Apostolic Vicariate of Dahomey.
- 13 May 1948: Renamed as Apostolic Vicariate of Ouidah.
- 14 September 1955: Promoted as Metropolitan Archdiocese of Cotonou.
- 1983: Foundation of the organisation Charity Service for the Integral Development of Man (SCDIH; French: Service de la Charité pour le développement intégral de l'homme) as the social arm of the diocese. It is a member of Caritas Benin.

== Special churches ==
The seat of the archbishop is the cathedral of Notre Dame de Miséricorde (Our Lady of Mercy) in Cotonou. Basilique de l'Immaculée Conception (Basilica of the Immaculate Conception) is a minor basilica in Cotonou.

== Bishops ==
- Metropolitan Archbishops of Cotonou, in reverse chronological order
  - Roger Houngbédji: 25 June 2016 – present
  - Antoine Ganyé: 21 August 2010 – 25 June 2016; formerly bishop of Dassa-Zoume, Benin
  - Marcel Honorat Léon Agboton: 5 March 2005 – 21 August 2010
  - Nestor Assogba: 29 October 1999 – 5 March 2005
  - Isidore de Souza: 27 December 1990 – 13 March 1999
  - Christophe Adimou: 28 June 1971 – 27 December 1990
  - Bernardin Gantin: 5 January 1960 – 28 June 1971; appointed Secretary of the Congregation for the Evangelization of Peoples; future cardinal

=== Coadjutor archbishop ===
- Isidore de Souza (1981-1990)

=== Auxiliary bishop ===
- Bernardin Gantin (1956-1960), appointed Archbishop here; future cardinal

=== Other priests of this diocese who became bishops ===
- Lucien Monsi-Agboka, appointed Bishop of Abomey in 1963
- Martin Adjou Moumouni, appointed Bishop of N'Dali in 1999
- Eugène Cyrille Houndékon, appointed Bishop of Abomey in 2007

== Suffragan dioceses ==
- Abomey
- Dassa-Zoumé
- Lokossa
- Porto Novo

== See also ==
- Catholic Church in Benin
- List of Roman Catholic dioceses in Benin
