= Diocese of Kandi =

Roman Catholic diocese in Benin

Diocese of Kandi Diœcesis Kandina
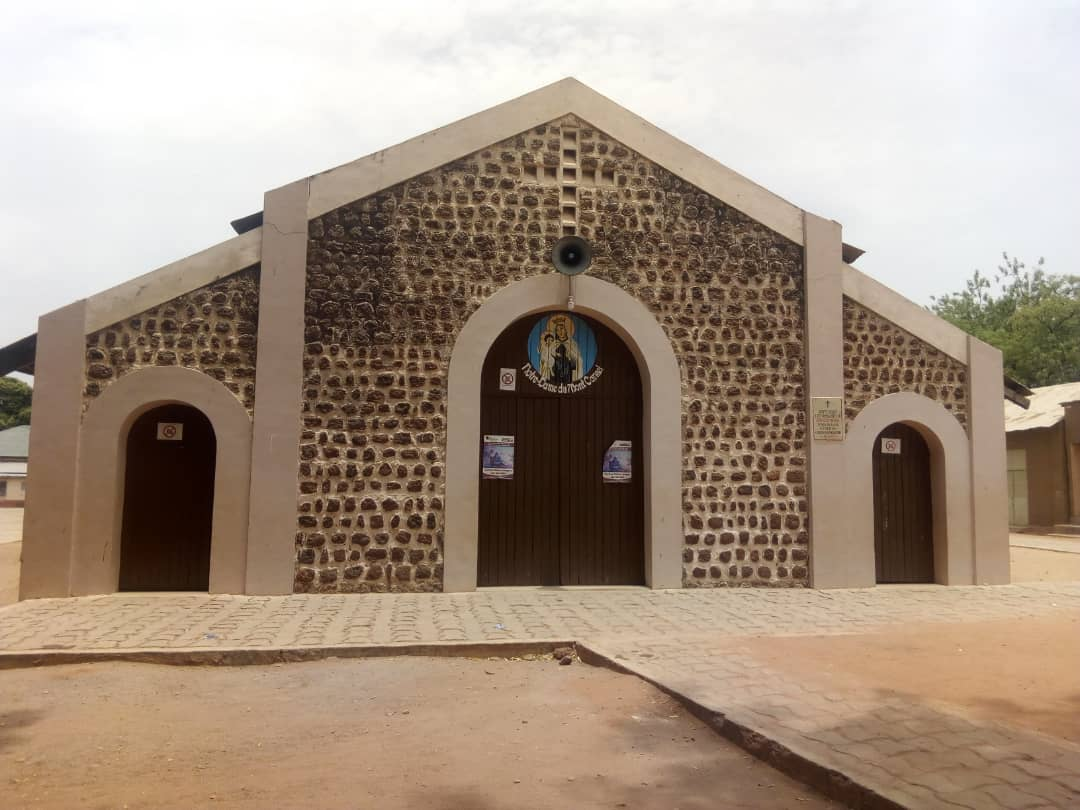
- Cathedral of Our Lady of Mount Carmel

Location
- Country: Benin
- Ecclesiastical province: Parakou
- Coordinates: 11°08′N 2°56′E

Statistics
- Area: 26,242 km^{2} (10,132 sq mi)
- Population: Total; Catholics: (as of 2016); 700,197; 27,863 (4%)
- Parishes: 12

Information
- Denomination: Catholic
- Sui iuris church: Latin Church
- Rite: Roman Rite
- Established: 19 December 1994 (30 years ago)
- Cathedral: Cathedral of Our Lady of Mount Carmel
- Secular priests: 21

Current leadership
- Pope: Leo XIV
- Bishop: Clet Feliho

Map
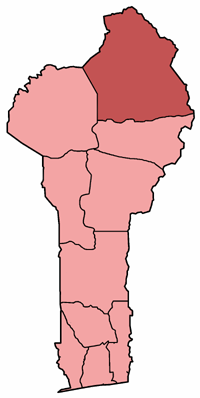

Website
- www.diocesedekandi.org/

The Roman Catholic Diocese of Kandi (Latin: Dioecesis Kandina) is a diocese located in the city of Kandi in the ecclesiastical province of Parakou in Benin.

Caritas Kandi is the social arm of the diocese.

== History ==
- 19 December 1994: Established as Diocese of Kandi from the Diocese of Parakou

== Leadership ==
- Bishops of Kandi (Roman rite), in reverse chronological order
  - Bishop Clet Feliho: since 29 January 2000
  - Bishop Marcel Honorat Léon Agboton: 19 December 1994 – 29 January 2000, appointed Bishop of Porto Novo; future Archbishop of Cotonou

== See also ==
- Roman Catholicism in Benin
