= Diocese of Natitingou =

Roman Catholic diocese in Benin

Coordinates: 10°18′N 1°22′E

Diocese of Natitingou Dioecesis Natitinguensis

Location
- Country: Benin
- Ecclesiastical region: Archdiocese of Cotonou
- Headquarters: Natitingou

Statistics
- Area: 20,499 km^{2} (7,915 sq mi)
- Population: Total; Catholics: (as of 2023); 1,096,770; 203,200 (18.5%)
- Parishes: 42

Information
- Denomination: Catholic Church
- Sui iuris church: Latin Church
- Rite: Roman Rite
- Established: 10 February 1964; 62 years ago

Current leadership
- Pope: Leo XIV
- Bishop: Antoine Sabi Bio
- Metropolitan Archbishop: Roger Houngbédji

The Roman Catholic Diocese of Natitingou (Latin: Dioecesis Natitinguensis) is a Latin Church diocese of the Catholic Church, located in the city of Natitingou in the ecclesiastical province of Cotonou in Benin.

== History ==
- February 10, 1964: Established as Diocese of Natitingou from the Apostolic Prefecture of Parakou.
- The same year, the Diocesan Office for the Development of Atacora (French: Bureau Diocésain pour le Développement de l’Atacora) was established as the social arm of the diocese, the current Caritas BDDA Natitingou.

== Leadership ==
- Bishops of Natitingou (Latin Church)
  - Bishop Patient Redois, S.M.A. (10 February 1964 – 11 November 1983), resigned
  - Bishop Nicolas Okioh (11 November 1983 – 10 June 1995), resigned
  - Bishop Pascal N’Koué (28 June 1997 – 14 June 2011), elevated to Archbishop of Parakou
  - Bishop Antoine Sabi Bio (13 March 2014 – Present)

== See also ==
- Roman Catholicism in Benin
