= Bernardin Gantin =

Beninese Catholic cardinal and Servant of God (1922–2008)

Servant of God Bernardin Gantin
- Dean of the College of Cardinals
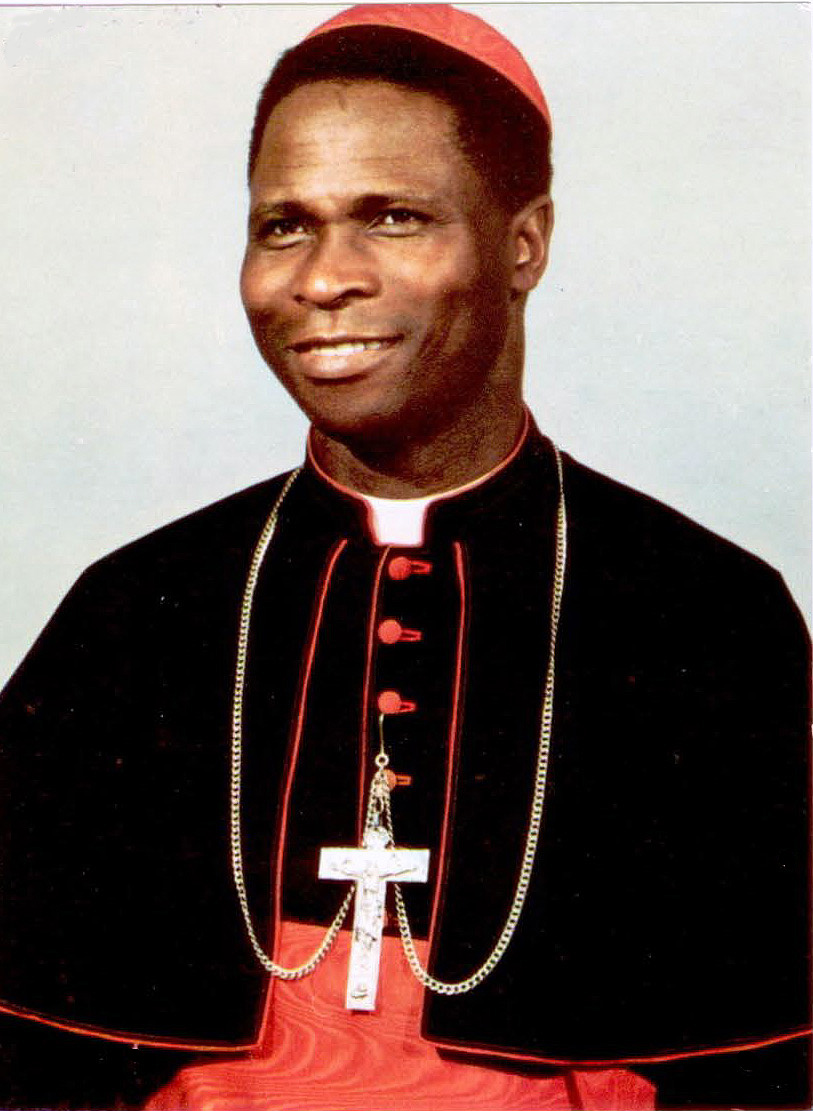
- Gantin during his early years as a cardinal
- Church: Catholic Church
- See: Ostia
- Installed: 5 June 1993
- Retired: 30 November 2002
- Predecessor: Agnelo Rossi
- Successor: Joseph Alois Ratzinger
- Previous posts: Auxiliary Bishop of Cotonou (1957‍–‍1960); Archbishop of Cotonou (1960‍–‍1971); President of the Pontifical Council for Justice and Peace (1976‍–‍1984); Prefect of the Congregation for Bishops (1984‍–‍1998); Dean of the College of Cardinals (1993‍–‍2002); Cardinal Bishop of Ostia (1993‍–‍2002)

Orders
- Ordination: 14 January 1951 by Louis Parisot
- Consecration: 3 February 1957 by Eugène Tisserant
- Created cardinal: 27 June 1977 by Pope Paul VI
- Rank: Cardinal-Bishop

Personal details
- Born: 8 May 1922 Toffo, Benin
- Died: 13 May 2008 (aged 86) Paris, France
- Education: Pontifical Urbaniana University; Pontifical Lateran University
- Motto: In tuo sancto servitio (Latin for 'In your holy service')
- Coat of arms

Sainthood
- Venerated in: Catholic Church
- Title as Saint: Servant of God

Styles of Bernardin Gantin
- Reference style: His Eminence
- Spoken style: Your Eminence
- Posthumous style: Servant of God
- Informal style: Cardinal
- See: Palestrina (Suburbicarian)

Bernardin Gantin (8 May 1922 – 13 May 2008) was a Beninese Catholic prelate who held senior positions in the Roman Curia for twenty years and the highest position in the College of Cardinals for nine years. His prominence in the hierarchy of the Church was unprecedented for an African and has been equaled by few non-Italians.

He began his career in his native country first as an auxiliary bishop and then as Archbishop of Cotonou. In 1971, he began his thirty-year career in the Curia. After he had spent several years in the role of senior assistant, he held a series of senior positions as president of the Pontifical Council for Justice and Peace, president of the Pontifical Council Cor Unum, and prefect of the Sacred Congregation for Bishops.

Pope Paul VI made him a cardinal in 1977, Pope John Paul II promoted him to the rank of cardinal-bishop in 1986, and his peers elected him dean, the highest office in the College of Cardinals, in 1993. He retired and returned to Benin when he turned 80. His cause for beatification was opened after his death and he was declared a Servant of God by Pope Francis.

== Early career ==
Bernadin Gantin was born in Toffo, French Dahomey (now Benin), on 8 May 1922. His name means "tree of iron" (gan, iron and tin, tree ). His father was a railway worker. He entered the minor seminary in Ouidah at age fourteen and was ordained to the priesthood on 14 January 1951 in Lomé, Togo, by Archbishop Louis Parisot of Cotonou. He then fulfilled pastoral assignments while also teaching languages at the seminary. In 1953 he was sent to Rome where he studied at the Pontifical Urban University and then at the Pontifical Lateran University, where he earned his licentiate in theology and canon law.

On 11 December 1956, Pope Pius XII appointed him titular bishop of Tipasa and auxiliary bishop of Cotonou. He received his episcopal consecration on 3 February 1957 from Cardinal Eugène Tisserant, Dean of the College of Cardinals in the chapel of the Pontificio Collegio Urbano de Propaganda Fide in Rome. On 5 January 1960, Pope John XXIII appointed him Archbishop of Cotonou. As archbishop, he attended all four sessions of the Second Vatican Council (1962–1965), where he first became friends with the future Pope John Paul II.

He was chairman of the West African Episcopal Conference.

== Roman curia ==
Pope Paul VI appointed him to the Roman Curia and gave him a series of assignments, starting as adjunct secretary of the Congregation for the Evangelization of Peoples in 1971 and secretary of that Congregation in 1973. On 19 December 1975 he was named Vice President of the Pontifical Council for Justice and Peace and on 5 January 1976 Gantin received the additional responsibilities of the Vice President of the Pontifical Council Cor Unum, as Pope Paul was combining those two departments.

In 1976, Pope Paul appointed him head of the President of the Pontifical Commission for Justice and Peace, making him the first African to head a curial department. This commission was headed by a cardinal, so Gantin held the title Pro-President until Pope Paul made him a cardinal on 27 June 1977. He was made a member of the order of cardinal deacons and assigned the deaconry of Sacro Cuore di Cristo Re.

On 4 September 1978, he was named President of the Pontifical Council Cor Unum by Pope John Paul I, the only administrative appointment of his month-long papacy. Gantin met with John Paul I the day before he died.

He participated in the August and October 1978 conclaves that elected Popes Pope John Paul I and Pope John Paul II. At the first of them he was reportedly one of three cardinals who counted the votes. During the second of these conclaves, Gantin was thought to be one of the papabili, those cardinals who are thought to have a chance of being elected pope.

In 1982, he accompanied Pope John Paul II on his visit to Benin.

On 8 April 1984, Pope John Paul II appointed him prefect of the Congregation for Bishops, which supervises episcopal appointments in the non-missionary Latin Rite dioceses throughout the world. He was also made president of the Pontifical Commission for Latin America. On 25 June 1984, Gantin opted to become a member of the order of cardinal priests. For the next fourteen years he collaborated with Pope John Paul in shaping the hierarchy of the Church, both in making appointments and in managing the agendas for the periodic visits bishops make to consult with the pope and the Curia. On the pope's behalf he managed appointments of conservative prelates in dioceses that did not welcome them in the Netherlands and Switzerland, removed an outspoken liberal French bishop, contended with Latin American advocates for the rights of indigenous peoples, and the excommunication of Marcel Lefebvre, with whom he had worked in Africa in the 1960s. Years later, John Paul referred to their years of "regular contact and an almost unique familiarity".

== Cardinal bishop and dean ==
Gantin's Episcopal Ordination on 3 February 1957 by Eugène Tisserant in the Pontificio Collegio Urbano de Propaganda Fide

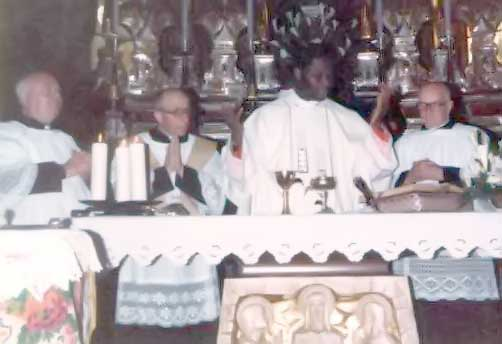
Gantin celebrating Mass, San Fiorano (Lodi), Italy, 1984

On 29 September 1986, Pope John Paul II appointed Gantin cardinal bishop of the suburbicarian diocese of Palestrina, one of six Latin-church members of the highest rank of cardinals, responsible for electing the dean and sub dean of the college who manage the conclave that elects the pope.

The six Latin church cardinal bishops elect the dean and subdean, who takes his position when the pope consents to the election. On 5 June 1993, Gantin was elected and confirmed Dean of the College of Cardinals, which gave him the additional title cardinal bishop of Ostia. He was the first non-European cardinal that been elected to that office.

He ended his service as prefect of the Congregation for Bishops and President of the Pontifical Commission for Latin America on 25 June 1998. Less than a year later, in April 1999, he endorsed a views of Cardinal Vincenzo Fagiolo that bishops need to consider themselves married to their sees and expect their relationship to be lifelong. He said he had been shocked by overt expressions of "careerism" and "social climbing". He suggested that bishops should be transferred "to less developed, more difficult sees rather than to more comfortable and prestigious ones". He also said that there should be no connection between a see and a place in the College of Cardinals, offering Milan as an example.

On 29 November 2002, with the permission of Pope John Paul, he retired as Dean of the College of Cardinals and cardinal bishop of Ostia, (Note: His retirement allowed Cardinal Joseph Ratzinger to succeed him as dean, which some Vatican observers believe made Ratzinger's election as pope inevitable, which may have motivated Gantin's repeated attempts to resign. Another describes Gantin as "the inadvertent architect of Ratzinger's election" to the papacy.) which required he reside in Rome. Now eighty years old, he retired to Cotonou, which he had visited regularly throughout his years in Rome. He remained cardinal bishop of Palestrina. Two years into his retirement he described his situation: "I left Rome in body but not in spirit. I am a Roman missionary in my country."

In retirement he spoke more freely than he had while under the obligations of office. In 2006 he criticized his contemporary bishops in Africa: "If I have to make a complaint it would be this: if at one time the bishops moved little, today they travel too much. Sitting down, listening, praying with their own believers is more that ever necessary and urgent for them. Always keeping in mind what is set down in canon 395 of the Code of Canon Law on the obligation of residence in their diocese, they can also be an example to their own priests." He warned against allowing African priests to relocate permanently in Europe, to "roam the dioceses of the Western world more in search of their own material comfort than out of genuine pastoral zeal". And he warned European religious orders against such personnel transfers: "The European religious congregations on their last legs or threatened with extinction should not go seeking cheap reinvigoration among the young Churches in Asia or Africa."

== Death and legacy ==
Gantin died at Pompidou Hospital in Paris after a long illness on 13 May 2008, less than a week after being transferred there from Benin and five days after his 86th birthday. The Beninese government declared three days of mourning for him, beginning on 14 May.

Pope Benedict XVI visited his tomb in the chapel of the Seminary of Saint Gall in Ouidah on 19 November 2011.

In May 2013, Vatican officials inaugurated a chair named for him devoted to "Socializing Policy in Africa" at the Pontifical Lateran University.

The Cadjehoun Airport, Benin's main international airport, was named in his honor.

== Cause of beatification ==
On 30 January 2025, the Episcopal Conference of the Italian Region of Lazio, which includes the Diocese of Rome, has issued a favourable opinion for the opening of the cause for beatification of Gantin.

== See also ==
- List of Africans venerated in the Catholic Church
- List of people declared Servants of God under Pope Francis

== Notes ==
Catholic Church titles
Preceded by Henri Léonard	— TITULAR — Titular Bishop of Tipasa in Mauretania; 11 December 1956 – 5 January 1960	Succeeded by Francisco Xavier da Piedade Rebelo
Preceded by Louis Parisot	Archbishop of Cotonou; 5 January 1960 – 28 June 1971	Succeeded by Christophe Adimou
Preceded by Sergio Pignedoli	Secretary of the Congregation for the Evangelization of Peoples; 26 February 1973 – 19 December 1975	Succeeded by Duraisamy Simon Lourdusamy
Preceded by Ramón Torrella Cascante	Vice-President of the Pontifical Commission for Justice and Peace; 19 December 1975 – 16 December 1976	Succeeded by Jan Pieter Schotte
Preceded by Ramón Torrella Cascante	Vice-President of the Pontifical Council Cor unum 16 December 1976 – 4 September 1978	Succeeded by Alfredo Bruniera
Preceded by Maurice Roy	President of the Pontifical Commission for Justice and Peace; 16 December 1976 – 8 April 1984	Succeeded by Roger Etchegaray
Preceded by Dino Staffa	Cardinal-Deacon of Sacro Cuore di Cristo Re; 27 June 1977 – 25 June 1984	Himself as Cardinal-Priest
Preceded by Jean-Marie Villot	President of the Pontifical Council Cor unum 4 September 1978 – 8 April 1984	Succeeded by Roger Etchegaray
Preceded by Sighard Kleiner	Vice-President of Pontifical Committee for International Eucharistic Congresses; 1983–1989	Position abolished
Preceded by Carlo Confalonieri	President of the Pontifical Council for the Pastoral Care of Migrants and Itinerant People; 8 April 1984 – 1 March 1989	Succeeded by Giovanni Cheli
Preceded by Sebastiano Baggio	Prefect of the Congregation for Bishops; 8 April 1984 – 25 June 1998	Succeeded by Lucas Moreira Neves
Preceded by Sebastiano Baggio	President of the Pontifical Commission for Latin America; 8 April 1984 – 25 June 1998	Succeeded by Lucas Moreira Neves
Himself as Cardinal-Deacon	Cardinal-Priest pro hac vice of Sacro Cuore di Cristo Re; 25 June 1984 – 29 September 1986	Succeeded by Jacques-Paul Martin
Preceded by Carlo Confalonieri	Cardinal-Bishop of Palestrina; 29 September 1986 – 13 May 2008	Succeeded by José Saraiva Martins
Preceded by Agnelo Rossi	Cardinal-Bishop of Ostia; 5 June 1993 – 30 November 2002	Succeeded by Joseph Aloisius Ratzinger
Preceded by Agnelo Rossi	Dean of the College of Cardinals; 5 June 1993 – 30 November 2002	Succeeded by Joseph Aloisius Ratzinger
