= Diocese of Abomey =

Catholic diocese in Benin

Diocese of Abomey Dioecesis Abomeiensis French: Diocèse d'Abomey

catholic
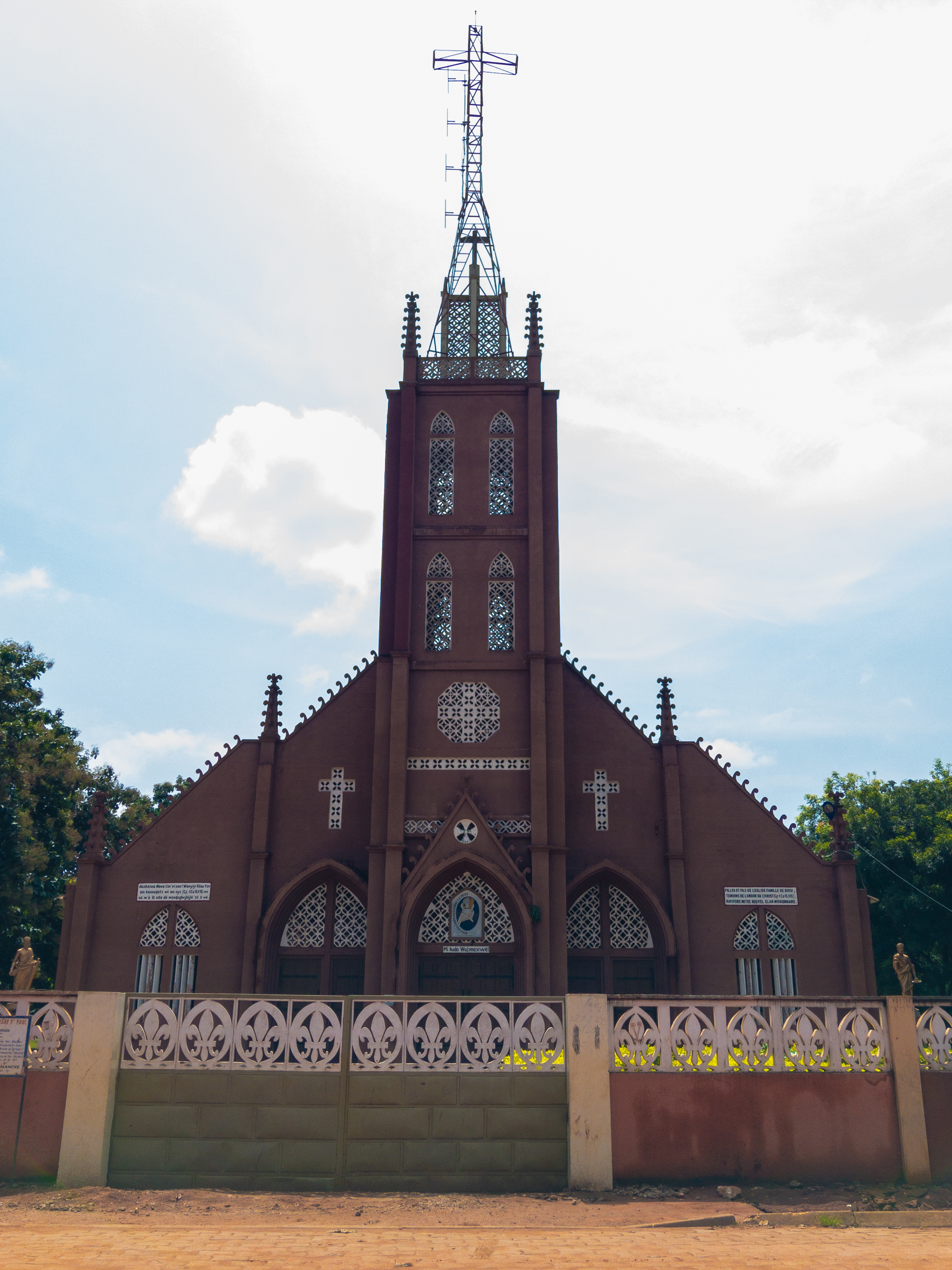
- Cathedral of Saints Pierre et Paul d'Abomey (Saints Peter and Paul of Abomey)

Location
- Country: Benin
- Episcopal conference: Episcopal Conference of Benin
- Ecclesiastical province: Cotonou
- Coordinates: 7°10′42″N 1°59′34″E

Statistics
- Population: Total; Catholics: (as of 2022); 852,000 (Note: Annuario Pontificio (2022) via Catholic-Hierarchy.org); 204,000 (23.9%)

Information
- Denomination: Catholic Church
- Sui iuris church: Latin Church
- Rite: Roman Rite
- Established: 5 April 1963; 62 years ago
- Diocese: Abomey
- Cathedral: Cathédrale Saints Pierre et Paul d'Abomey (French for 'Cathedral of Saints Peter and Paul of Abomey')
- Secular priests: 143
- Language: French

Current leadership
- Pope: Leo XIV
- Bishop: Eugène Cyrille Houndékon
- Metropolitan Archbishop: Roger Houngbédji

The Diocese of Abomey (Latin: Dioecesis Abomeiensis) is a Catholic Latin Church diocese located in the city of Abomey in the ecclesiastical province of Cotonou in Benin.

Caritas Abomey is the social arm of the diocese.

== History ==
- 5 April 1963: Established as Diocese of Abomey from the Metropolitan Archdiocese of Cotonou and Diocese of Porto Novo

== Bishops ==
- Bishops of Abomey, in reverse chronological order
  - Eugène Cyrille Houndékon: 20 December 2007‍–‍present
  - René-Marie Ehuzu, C.I.M.: 25 November 2002 – 3 January 2007, appointed Bishop of Porto Novo
  - Lucien Monsi-Agboka: 5 April 1963 – 25 November 2002

=== Other priest of this diocese who became bishop ===
- Barthélemy Adoukonou, appointed titular bishop of Zama Minor in 2011 (had already been appointed Secretary of the Pontifical Council for Culture)

== See also ==
- Catholic Church in Benin
- Episcopal Conference of Benin
