= Coffee (disambiguation) =

Coffee is a popular beverage.

Coffee may also refer to:

== Botany ==
- Coffea, a genus of flowering plants
  - Coffea arabica, the species first cultivated
  - Coffee bean, the seed ground to make coffee

== Computing ==
- COFFEE (Cinema 4D), a scripting language
- .coffee, filename extension for CoffeeScript literate programs

== Films ==
- Coffee (2022 film), a Marathi-language film
- Café (2014 film), or Coffee, a Nahuatl-language documentary
- Coffee with Kadhal, a 2022 Tamil-language romantic comedy

== Songs ==
- "Coffee" (Kelly Rowland song), 2020
- "Coffee" (Miguel song), 2015
- "Coffee", the Arabian Dance from The Nutcracker
- "Coffee", by Aesop Rock from None Shall Pass, 2007
- "Coffee", by Beabadoobee, 2017
- "Coffee", by Chappell Roan from The Rise and Fall of a Midwest Princess, 2023
- "Coffee", by Good Kid, 2026
- "Coffee", by Sylvan Esso from Sylvan Esso, 2014
- "Coffee", by Urban Zakapa, 2009; covered by BTS on O!RUL8,2?, 2013
- "Coffee (Give Me Something)", by Tiësto and Vintage Culture, 2020
- "The Coffee Song", first performed in 1946 by Frank Sinatra
- "The Coffee Cantata, an alternative name for "Schweigt stille, plaudert nicht, BWV 211" by Johann Sebastian Bach

== People ==
- Coffee (surname), list of people so named
- Coffee Johnny, English blacksmith John Oliver (1829–1900) as immortalised in the folk song "Blaydon Races"
- Original Koffee (born 2000), Jamaican singer-songwriter

== Places ==
=== United States ===
- Coffee, Georgia, a community in Bacon County
- Coffee City, Texas, a town
- Coffee County (disambiguation), multiple counties in the U.S. with the same name
  - Coffee High School (disambiguation), multiple schools in the U.S. with the same name
- Coffee Precinct, Wabash County, Illinois
- Coffee Road, a trail through southern Georgia and Florida
- Coffee Swamp, Wisconsin
- Isle aux Herbes, or Coffee Isle, a barrier island in the Mississippi Sound, Alabama

=== Elsewhere ===
- Coffee Crater, British Columbia, Canada

== Other uses ==
- Coffee (color), a brown
- Centre of Full Employment and Equity (CofFEE), University of Newcastle, Australia
- Coffee #1, a British coffee house chain
- "Coffee" (Barbara), a television episode
- Ethiopian Coffee FC, a football club based in Addis Ababa
- a lion used as Leo the Lion (MGM)

== See also ==
- COFEE, the Computer Online Forensic Evidence Extractor, a tool kit for computer forensic investigators
- Coffey (disambiguation)
- Coffy (disambiguation)
- Coffi
