= Coffey (surname) =

Coffey (/ˈkoʊfi/, /ˈkɒfi/) is an Irish surname, from the Gaelic Irish Ó Cobhthaigh. Ó Cobhthaigh was the name of an Irish Brehon family from County Westmeath and County Longford. They were known as the chief ollamhs or filí of Uisneach, where there is a Tuar Uí Cobhthaigh, Toorcoffey (Coffey's Tower).

Notable people with the surname include:

- Aeneas Coffey (1780–1852), Irish inventor
- Alvin Aaron Coffey Sr. (1822–1902), American pioneer, homesteader, miner, and farmer in California; who was formerly enslaved
- Amir Coffey (born 1997), American basketball player
- Ann Coffey (born 1946), British politician
- Brian Coffey (1905–1995), Irish poet
- Cath Coffey, British vocalist of Stereo MC's
- Charles Coffey (?–1745), Irish playwright
- Denise Coffey (1936–2022), British actress
- Dennis Coffey (born 1940), American guitarist
- Elizabeth Coffey, American actress
- Ellie-Jean Coffey, Australian surfer, model, and actress
- George Nelson Coffey (1875−1967), American pedologist
- Greg Coffey (born 1971), Australian London-based hedge fund manager
- Jack Coffey (baseball) (1887–1966), Major League Baseball player
- James Coffey (1939–2024), American politician
- John Coffey (disambiguation), several people
- Joseph L. Coffey, Roman Catholic Bishop of the Archdiocese for the Military Services, USA
- Kellie Coffey (born 1971), American singer-songwriter
- Michael J. Coffey (c. 1840 – 1907), New York politician
- Paul Coffey (born 1961), Canadian hockey player
- Peter Coffey (1876–1943), Irish Roman Catholic priest and Neoscholastic philosopher
- Renee Coffey (born 1982), Australian politician
- Russell Coffey (1898–2007), one of the last three surviving American World War I veterans
- Sam Coffey (born 1998), American soccer player
- Seamus Coffey – Irish economist
- Sean Coffey (born 1956), New York lawyer
- Susanna Coffey, American artist
- Tabatha Coffey, Australian hairstylist
- Tāmati Coffey (born 1979), New Zealand broadcaster and politician
- Thérèse Coffey, British Conservative Member of Parliament
- Todd Coffey (born 1980), Major League Baseball relief pitcher
- Vanessa Coffey, American television executive
- Victoria Coffey (1911–1999), Irish paediatrician
- Virginia Coffey (1904–2003), American civil rights activist
- Wayne Coffey (footballer) (born 1964), American football player
- William Coffey (VC) (1829–1875), Irish Victoria Cross recipient
- William Coffey (cricketer) (born 1885, date of death unknown), Irish cricketer

== See also ==
- Justice Coffey (disambiguation)
- Coffee (surname)
- Coffie, a surname
