= Toffel =

Toffel is a surname. Notable people with the surname include:

- Michael Toffel, American economist
- Roger Toffel (1909–1969), Swiss Olympic field hockey player

== See also ==
- Toffey
- Toffler
- Toffolo
