= Cinema 4D =

3D computer graphics software

- Screenshot of Cinema 4D Release 12 running under Windows 7
- Original authors: Philip Losch; Christian Losch
- Developer: Maxon
- Release: 1990; 36 years ago
- Stable release: 2027.0.0 / October 14, 2026; 1 day ago
- Written in: C++, Python
- Operating system: Microsoft Windows, macOS, Linux, AmigaOS (Version 4.2), BeOS
- Type: 3D computer graphics
- License: Trialware
- Website: www.maxon.net/cinema-4d

Cinema 4D is a 3D software suite developed by the German company Maxon.

== Overview ==
As of R21, only a single version of Cinema 4D is available. It replaces all previous variants, including BodyPaint 3D, and includes all features of the past 'Studio' variant. With R21, all binaries were unified. There is no technical difference between commercial, educational, or demo versions. The difference is now only in licensing. 2014 saw the release of Cinema 4D Lite, which came packaged with Adobe After Effects Creative Cloud 2014. "Lite" acts as an introductory version, with many features withheld. This is part of a partnership between the two companies, where a Maxon-produced plug-in, called Cineware, allows any variant to create a seamless workflow with After Effects. The "Lite" variant is dependent on After Effects CC, needing the latter application running to launch, and is only sold as a package component included with After Effects CC through Adobe.

Initially, Cinema 4D was developed for Amiga computers in the early 1990s, and the first three versions of the program were available exclusively for that platform. With v4, however, Maxon began to develop the application for Windows and Macintosh computers as well, citing the wish to reach a wider audience and the growing instability of the Amiga market following Commodore's bankruptcy. It was also released for BeOS.

On Linux, Cinema 4D is available as a commandline rendering version.

== Modules and older variants ==
From R12 to R20, Cinema 4D was available in four variants. A core Cinema 4D 'Prime' application, a 'Broadcast' version with additional motion-graphics features, 'Visualize,' which adds functions for architectural design and 'Studio,' which includes all modules.

From Release 8 until Release 11.5, Cinema 4D had a modular approach to the application, with the ability to expand upon the core application with various modules. This ended with Release 12, though the functionality of these modules remains in the different flavors of Cinema 4D (Prime, Broadcast, Visualize, Studio)

The old modules were:

- Advanced Render (global illumination/HDRI, caustics, ambient occlusion and sky simulation)
- BodyPaint 3D (direct painting on UVW meshes; now included in the core. In essence Cinema 4D Core/Prime and the BodyPaint 3D products are identical. The only difference between the two is the splash screen that is shown at startup and the default user interface.)
- Dynamics (for simulating soft body and rigid body dynamics)
- Hair (simulates hair, fur, grass, etc.)
- MOCCA (character animation and cloth simulation)
- MoGraph (Motion Graphics procedural modelling and animation toolset)
- NET Render (to render animations over a TCP/IP network in render farms)
- PyroCluster (simulation of smoke and fire effects)
- Prime (the core application)
- Broadcast (adds MoGraph2)
- Visualize (adds Virtual Walkthrough, Advanced Render, Sky, Sketch and Toon, data exchange, camera matching)
- Studio (the complete package)

== Version history ==
1990	Christian and Philip Losch enter their ray-tracer into Kickstart magazine's monthly programming contest, and win the competition.
1991	FastRay (Cinema 4D's first name) is released for the Amiga.
1993	Cinema 4D V1 is released for Amiga.
1994	Release of Cinema 4D V1.5 and V2 for Amiga.
1995	Release of Cinema 4D V2.1 and V3.0 for Amiga.; Plans are made for porting Cinema 4D to the PC platform.; New programmer team begins development of a completely new, operating-system-independent architecture.
1996	Cinema 4D V4 for Windows, Alpha NT, Macintosh and Amiga is released.; The first multi-processor version of Cinema 4D is made available.
1997	The development of a production-level version begins, integrating the latest technologies.; The last version of Cinema 4D for Amiga, V4.2, is released.; The first production-worthy version is released — Cinema 4D XL V5.
1998	Cinema 4D SE V5 is released.
1999	Cinema 4D GO V5 and Cinema 4D NET are introduced.
2000	Cinema 4D XL V6 is released.; BodyPaint 3D is made available as an integrated version for Cinema 4D, and as a standalone version for other 3D packages.
2001	Cinema 4D ART is introduced.; PyroCluster and Dynamics modules are introduced.; Cinema 4D XL R7 is shipped worldwide.; MAXON integrates the shader set Smells like Almonds from bhodiNUT.
2002	Cinema 4D R8 is released with a modular system. The new modules are Advanced Render, PyroCluster, MOCCA and Thinking Particles.
2003	Cinema 4D R8.5 is released.; BodyPaint 3D R2 is introduced.; Sketch and Toon module is introduced.
2004	Cinema 4D R9 is released.
2005	Cinema 4D R9.5 is released.; HAIR module is introduced.
2006	Cinema 4D R9.6 is released.; MoGraph module is introduced.; Cinema 4D R10 with integrated BodyPaint 3D is released.
2007	Cinema 4D becomes the first professional 3-D graphics application released as a Universal Binary for Apple's new Intel-powered Macs (even before Apple Universal Binary versions of its own software are released).; Service update R10.1 is released in March, in response to bug feedback provided to Maxon by users and testers.; Service update R10.111 released to address several reported problems, such as stability.; Cinema 4D R10.5 is released, and features updates to MOCCA and MoGraph, as well as an optimization of the HAIR module.
2008	Cinema 4D R11 released.; Cinema 4D supports 64-bit architecture on Apple G5 and Intel-powered Macs.; A new implementation of Global Illumination (included in the Advanced Render module) offers a higher quality than that of the old version, and much improved animation support.; Non-Linear Animation has been completely reworked.; The Renderman support (CINEMAN) is now included in AR.
2009	Cinema 4D R11.5 released.; Introduces MoGraph 2 (which includes MoDynamics [Uses the Bullet Engine], PolyFX, and MoSplines); Bucket rendering reduces render times and manages clone instancing and memory management much more efficiently. Anti-Aliasing methods to choose from are Scanline, Ray-Tracing, and Hybrid (which uses both to best optimize quality vs. speed). Also greatly improved Subpolygon Displacement and Area Shadows efficiency and speed using Multi-Threading.; An enhanced Picture Viewer that will allow a history of renders, RAM previews, and A/B swiping. Also, manages post filtering and Multi-Pass Layers.; Full 3D support for Apple Motion, and improved support with Adobe After Effects. Also, exports clones and XRefs to Motion and After Effects, as well as the ability to bring in solids for mapping video onto 3D surfaces. It can also export multiple cameras at once.; Fully compatible with Mac OS X Snow Leopard (10.6) and Windows 7.; QuickTime for Windows (64 bit) now supported.; File exchange for FBX 2010.0; Other new features include a new Camera Shader which will map any camera view onto any surface, improved MoGraph Effectors, and other general improvements and refinements.
2010	Cinema 4D R12 released.; Dynamics has been improved (complex physics engine); Menu has been cleaned up.; Many minor improvements like the Shaders and Materials.; Linear workflow introduced with correct display in OGL.; Double precision calculation introduced and true units.; Support for IES lights and physically correct lighting.; Integration of Python; Support of OpenGL 3; Support for PPC CPUs
2011	Cinema 4D R13 released.; New Physical Render engine (More photorealistic: Physical Camera with ISO, f-stop and shutter speed or angle, true depth of field, true motion blurring, lens distortion, vignetting, and chromatic aberration.); Stereoscopy. New Stereoscopic Camera and Rendering with real-time display. Supports Anaglyph, Side-by-Side, Interlaced, or Active Shutter mode for 3D Monitors, projectors and glasses.; New Character tools, allowing the user to set up complex rigs quickly and easily. CMotion Walk Cycle editor; Character Components for TDs to define rig hierarchies, and new Muscle Object & MSkin Deformer.; Animation refinements. Rotation Order and Gimbaling Rotation Axis to detect and correct gimbal lock. Better timeline markers. Finely tuned F-Curves. Colored animation paths.; Optimized Modeling workflow. (Enhanced cloning and extrusions; Advanced selection tools; new optimized HyperNURBS weighting algorithm for cleaner topology and sharper but smooth creases; Axis toggle; Auto Tweaking; Easy, intuitive Snapping; Variable Speed Scaling; Better ClothNURBS Extrusion); New, accurate Sub-Surface Scattering shader (SSS). Terrain Mask shader. Brick Shader enhancements. Enhanced MoGraph Muti-Shader.; Improved Interface and Workflow. Enhanced Picture Viewer. All-new External Referencing System for XRefs.; New Import/Export features (After Effects Integration; FBX Import/Export supports 2010, 2011, and 2012; Multi-Channel OpenEXR; Enhanced Sound Format support including AIF, MP3, and AAC; Collada 1.5; BodyPaint 3D support for Maya UVs)
2012	Cinema 4D R14 released (September 4, 2012); Sculpting Tools.; Enhanced Dynamics (Aerodynamics); Plastic Deformations & Breakable Springs.; Enhanced Xpresso UI.; Camera Calibrator. Integrate 3D element into photographs.; Morph camera and motion camera. Blend between different cameras. Create natural dynamic camera motion.; New Shaders: Wood shader, weathering shader, normalizer; Subsurface Scattering enhancements.; GI Multiple Importance Sampling; Radiosity Maps; NUKE export with position pass render; Xrefs enhanced; Completely overhauled snapping and new guides/workplanes
2013	Cinema 4D R15 released (September 1, 2013); New GI and AO; New Bevel Tool; Intel Embree Support; Builtin Network Render Support (Team Render); Kerning Support; Enhanced Sculpting Tools; Workflow Improvements
2014	Cinema 4D R16 released (September 2, 2014); 3D Motion Tracking; New PolyPen Modeling Tool; Multi-layer reflections; New Cogwheel Spline Primitive; Team Render Server; New UV Peeler; Updated FBX and Alembic support; Bevel Deformer works non-destructively; Solo Mode added
2015	Cinema 4D R17 released; Take System; Onboard Spline tools; Sculpt to PoseMorph; Material Override; Variation and Formula Shaders; Houdini Engine Integration
2016	Cinema 4D R18 released; Fracture Voronoi; New knife tools; Object Tracker; Shaders and surface effects; Viewport enhancement
2017	Cinema 4D R19 released (September, 2017); Integration of Radeon ProRender; OpenGL improved with depth of field and reflections; Voronoi object fracturing improved; File import and export system overhauled; Level of detail object added; Polygon reduction overhauled; 360 spherical rendering for VR
2018	Cinema 4D R20 (September, 2018); Node-Based Materials; MoGraph Fields; CAD Data Import; Volume Modeling; ProRender Enhancements
2019	Cinema 4D R21 (September, 2019); Only one version of Cinema 4D (All functionality is in the one version, no separate editions anymore); New Licensing Solutions; Field Force Object; Caps and Bevel Updates (New controls for adding more complex functions to caps and bevels); Mixamo Control Rig; Volume Enhancements (Cache Layer, Vector Volumes); Volume Rendering with ProRender; Denoiser (Intel Open Image Denoiser); UI resolution increase for 4k+ monitors
2020	Cinema 4d R23 (September, 2020); The Creation of Cinema 4d S series (Which offers more frequent updates to subscribers); UV Editor complete overhaul; Animation Enhancement ( Pose Library, Delta Mush, Character Solver, Toon & Face Rigs, Key enhancement, Copy and Paste Ease, Markers); Magic Bullet Looks (Looks applied in real-time to viewport, and final Render as post effect); Remesh Generator update
2021	Cinema 4D R25 (September, 2021); User Interface Enhancements (Updated Icons and Schemes); Capsule (Capsule Assets constructed in Cinema 4D's Scene Nodes core offer procedural plugin-like power); Spline Import (Import vector artwork from Adobe Illustrator, PDF and SVG files to use in your 3D scenes); Scene Manager / Scene Nodes (preview) Uses node-based assets to construct procedural geometry or entire scenes in a hierarchy-based view
2022	Cinema 4D S26 (April, 2022); Cinema 4D 2023 (September, 2022); Redshift Integration (Viewport Preview, Exchange, Other improvements); Simulation (Simulation scene, Rope simulation, Cloth simulation); Modeling (ZRemesher, More Modeling Tools); Task Manager; Scene Nodes; General Enhancements (Animation, UI Refinement, Performance, Asset Browser, SDK)
2023	Cinema 4D 2024 (September, 2023); Rigid Bodies (Calculate Simulations via CPU or GPU); Pyro (New Emission Type - Points); Vertex Normal Editing (New Editing Manager); Modeling (New Options and Improvements); Nodes (New Nodes and Speed Improvements); Exchange (Improved Import/Export Options)

== Use in industry ==
A number of films and related works have been modeled and rendered in Cinema 4D, including:

- The Girl with the Dragon Tattoo
- Beowulf
- The Ship-boys of Bontekoe
- The Golden Compass
- Surf's Up
- We Are the Strange
- Spider-Man 3
- Monster House
- War of the Worlds
- Chronicles of Narnia
- Serenity
- Inception
- Doom
- Prehistoric Park
- Homework
- Van Helsing
- Bernd das Brot
- Generation
- The Polar Express
- TV Patrol (logo and in-newscasting props)
- Sausage Party
- King Arthur
- June 17, 1953, State of Emergency
- Open Season
- He Was a Quiet Man
- Surrogates
- Tron: Legacy
- Roger Waters: The Wall Live tour projections (some of them)
- Iron Man 3
- Pacific Rim
- Dick Figures: The Movie (Paris Pursuit sequence and Crookygrin's plane, CG animation by Joel Moser)
- The Nut Job
- Soul Snatcher (赤狐书生)
- Eurovision Song Contest and Junior Eurovision Song Contest (graphics)
- Where the Dead Go to Die
- Furious 7
- Insignificant / Une espèce à part
- Avengers: Endgame
- Oops Ikooo (우당탕탕 아이쿠)
- Galaxy Guards (우당탕탕 은하안전단)
- Doctor Who, Silence in the Library
- Strictly Come Dancing (title graphics)

== Cinebench ==
Cinebench
- Developer: MAXON Computer GmbH
- Stable release: 2026.1.0 / December 22, 2025 (file date)
- Operating system: Microsoft Windows, macOS, AmigaOS
- Type: 3D computer graphics Benchmark
- License: Freeware
- Website: www.maxon.net/en/downloads/cinebench-downloads

Cinebench is a cross-platform test suite which tests a computer's hardware capabilities. It can be used as a test for Cinema 4D's 3D modeling, animation, motion graphic and rendering performance on multiple CPU cores. The program "target[s] a certain niche and [is] better suited for high-end desktop and workstation platforms".

Cinebench is commonly used to demonstrate hardware capabilities at tech shows to show a CPU performance, especially by tech YouTubers and review sites.

== See also ==
- COFFEE, scripting language in Cinema 4D
- LightWave 3D
- Electric Image Animation System
- Modo
- Autodesk Maya
- Autodesk 3ds Max
- ZBrush
- Blender
- Aladdin4D
- Softimage 3D
- Houdini (software)
- Octane Render
- List of 3D modeling software
