= Uaithne Ó Cobhthaigh =

Irish poet

Uaithne Ó Cobhthaigh (murdered 1556) was an Irish poet.

== Biography ==
Ó Cobhthaigh (English = Uaithne O'Coffey) was a member of a hereditary bardic family based in what is now County Westmeath. His father's name was William.

According to the Annals of the Four Masters, in 1556 "Owny, the son of William O'Coffey, the most learned in Ireland in poetry, was treacherously slain at night, at Baile-an-luig in Magh-bhachla, but it is not known by whom." The Oxford Dictionary of National Biography states that "he was murdered, with his wife, at Ballinlig, Westmeath."

== Verse ==
At least two of his poems still exist: "Mó ná iarla anim Shémais"/"Greater than an earl is the name of James", and the theological poem, "Fada an cuimhne so ar choir nDe"/"Long be this remembrance on the justice of God", which consists of one hundred and sixty verses.

== See also ==
- Aedh Ó Cobhthaigh, died 1452.
- Murchadh Bacagh Ó Cobhthaigh, died 1478.
- Tadhg Ó Cobhthaigh, died 1556.
