= Diarmait Ó Cobhthaigh =

Irish poet

Diarmait Ó Cobhthaigh (fl. 1584) was an Irish poet.

Ó Cobhthaigh was a member of a hereditary bardic family, based in what is now County Westmeath but was once the heartland of the original kingdom of Mide. The family were from the district known as Fir Thulach.

Dairmait was the author of a lament for his murdered relative, Uaithne Ó Cobhthaigh (died 1556), which begins Dá néll orcha ós iath Uisnigh/Two clouds of woe over the land of Uisneach. His other work included five theological poems:

- Díon cloinne a n-éec a n-athar ("Safeguard of children in the death of their father"), which consisted of one hundred and sixty verses.
- Fiú a bheatha bás tighearna ("The cost of life the death of a lord")
- Mairg as aidhne a n-aghaidh breithimh ("Alas! the pleader is facing the judge")
- Mairg nach taithigh go teacgh ríogh ("Alas! that I did not go to the king's house")
- Deacair aidhneas earca ríogh ("A powerful argument the tributes of a king")

Extant versions of some of these poems are held by the Royal Irish Academy.

== See also ==
- An Clasach Ó Cobhthaigh (died 1415)
- Maeleachlainn Ó Cobhthaigh (died 1429)
