= Donnchadh Ó Cobhthaigh =

Irish poet

Diarmait Ó Cobhthaigh was an Irish poet, fl. 1584.

Ó Cobhthaigh was a member of a hereditary bardic family, based in what is now County Westmeath but was once the heartland of the original kingdom of Mide. The family were from the district known as Fir Thulach.

He was the author of a penitential composition, Acht mar uisge d'éis a leata ("Just as water, after it has frozen"), which was a translation of the Latin poem Lympha coacta gelu ("Liquid, condensed by cold"). The translation survives only in a black half-column of Rawlinson B 505, on folio 89vb, a collection of Irish saint's lives now held by the Bodleian Library, Oxford.

== See also ==
- An Clasach Ó Cobhthaigh, died 1415.
- Diarmait Ó Cobhthaigh, fl. 1584.
