= John Coffee (disambiguation) =

John Coffee (1772–1833) was an American planter and Tennessee militia general.

John Coffee may also refer to:

- John C. Coffee (born 1944), American law professor at Columbia University
- John E. Coffee (1782–1836), general in Georgia militia and US Congressman
- John M. Coffee (1897–1983), U.S. Representative from Washington state
- John T. Coffee (1816–1890), Confederate general during the American Civil War

== See also ==
- John Coffee Hays (1817–1883), Texan ranger captain and military officer
- John Coffey (disambiguation)
- Coffee (surname)
- Coffee Johnny, English blacksmith John Oliver (1829–1900) as immortalised in the folk song "Blaydon Races"
- Coffey (disambiguation)
