= New Bridge (Dublin) =

Bridge over the River Dodder in Ireland

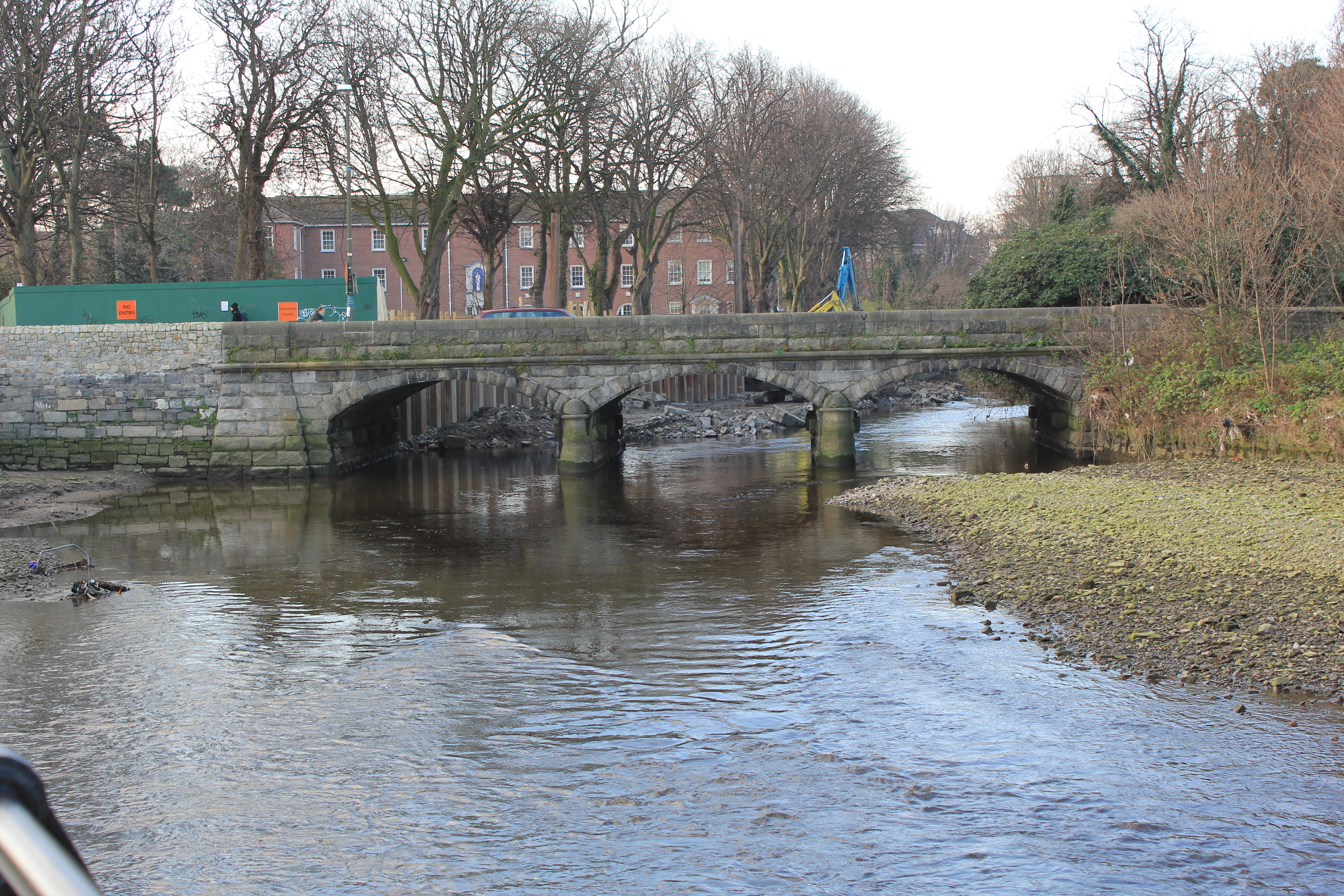
- New Bridge seen from downstream.
- Coordinates: 53.334367°N 6.225365°W
- Crosses: River Dodder
- Maintained by: Dublin City Council

Characteristics
- Material: Granite
- No. of spans: 3

History
- Construction end: Unknown, sometime after 1837

The New Bridge is a bridge over the River Dodder in Dublin, Ireland. It is also known as Herbert's Bridge or Lansdowne Bridge.

The bridge is part of Lansdowne Road where it connects with Herbert Road and Newbridge Avenue.

== History ==
It is not known when the New Bridge structure was erected. It does not appear on the 1837 map of Dublin.

It occupies the site of an older bridge on the site from approximately 1623.
