= Coffey =

Coffey may refer to:

== People ==
- Coffey (surname)
- Coffey Anderson (born 1978), American singer and songwriter

== Places ==
- Coffey, Missouri
- Coffey County, Kansas
  - Coffey County Airport, an airport in Burlington, Kansas
- Coffey Stadium, a stadium in Fairfax, Virginia

== Other uses ==
- Tetra Tech Coffey, formerly Coffey International
- Coffey the Dog, an Australian shepherd in the 2012 German children's film Famous Five

== See also ==
- Justice Coffey (disambiguation)
- Coffee (disambiguation)
- Coffie, a surname
- Cofie, a surname
