= Anoumou =

Anoumou is both a given name and a surname. Notable people with the name include:

- Anoumou Aguiar (born 1965), Togolese boxer
- Coffi Roger Anoumou (born 1972), Beninese Roman Catholic bishop
