= Toffey =

Toffey is a surname. Notable people with the surname include:

- John J. Toffey (1844–1911), American Civil War veteran
- Will Toffey (born 1994), American baseball player

== See also ==
- Coffey (surname)
- Toffel
