= Cornelius O'Brien =

Cornelius O'Brien may refer to:

- Cornelius O'Brien (piper) (fl. 1656), Irish musician
- Cornelius O'Brien (bishop) (1843–1906), Canadian Roman Catholic priest, archbishop, and author
- Cornelius O'Brien (County Clare) (1782–1857), politician and builder of O'Brien's tower
- Cornelius J. O'Brien (1869–1954), vaudeville and minstrel show performer
