= Video game art design =

Art design in video game development

Video game art design is a subset of game development involving the process of creating the artistic aspects of video games. Video game art design begins in the pre-production phase of creating a video game. Video game artists are visual artists involved from the conception of the game who make rough sketches of the characters, setting, objects, etc. These starting concept designs can also be created by the game designers before the game is moved into actualization. Sometimes, these concept designs are called "programmer art". After the rough sketches are completed and the game is ready to be moved forward, those artists or more artists are brought in to develop graphic designs based on the sketches.

The art design of a game can involve anywhere from one person and up. Small gaming companies tend to not have as many artists on the team, meaning that their artist must be skilled in several types of art development, whereas the larger the company, although an artist can be skilled in several types of development, the roles each artist plays becomes more specialized.

== Overview ==
A game's artwork included in media, such as demos and screenshots, has a significant impact on customers, because artwork can be judged from previews, while gameplay cannot.

Artists work closely with designers on what is needed for the game.

Tools used for art design and production are known as art tools. These can range from pen and paper to full software packages for both 2D and 3D digital art. A developer may employ a tools team responsible for art production applications. This includes using existing software packages and creating custom exporters and plug-ins for them.

== History ==
Early video games typically had very limited visuals, and were developed by sole programmers. Dedicated artists were however involved very early in video game history, for example for box art and promotional materials. In 1974, Maze Wars achieved rudimentary 3D graphics using wireframes, and more detailed pixel art emerged through the late 1970s. A notable early game artist was Shigeru Miyamoto, creator of Mario and Donkey Kong.

Visuals were offered more complexity by technological advances in the 1980s, including the addition of broader colour pallettes. Microprose hired its first dedicated artist, Michael Haire in 1985. Better colour depth came with the 16 bit generation in 1989, and the arrival of the CD in the 1990s increased storage space for games. This opened possibilities such as full motion video. 3D artwork became more common beginning in the early 1990s. Games in the 2010s pushed for increased realism, such as the use of photogrammetry and motion capture. The reduction of hardware limitations has continued to broaden possibilities for video game art, and larger art departments have become the norm.

== Disciplines ==
There are several roles under the game art umbrella. Depending on the size of the project, there may be anywhere from a single artist to an entire department. In smaller teams, individual artists will generally have to take on multiple responsibilities. AAA projects generally require large teams composed primarily of specialists in the different game art disciplines. Like any other kind of artist, game artists require an understanding of the artistic fundamentals.

A number of game art roles are listed below. Some of these are only applicable to certain kinds of projects, for example a 3D title may not require sprite work.

=== Lead artist / art director ===
The art director/lead artist is a person who monitor the progress of the other artists to make sure that the art for the game is staying on track. The art director is there to ensure that all the art created works cohesively. They manage their team of artists and distribute projects. The art director often works with other departments in the game and is involved from the conception of the game until the game is finished.

=== 2D artists ===
- Concept artist: A video game artist who works with game designers to produce concept art (such as character and environment sketches) and shape the "look of the game". A concept artist's job is to follow the art director's vision. The produced art may be in traditional media, such as drawings or clay molds, or 2D software, such as Adobe Photoshop. Concept art produced in the beginning of the production serves as a guide for the rest of development. Concept art is used for demonstration to the art director, producers and stakeholders.
  - Storyboard artist or storyboarder: A concept artist who designs and articulates scene sequences for review before main art production. They work with the concept artists and designers of the game from conception, to create an outline for the rest of the artists to follow. Sometimes this is passed on to other departments, like game writers and programmers, for a base of their work. They develop the cinematics of the game. The storyboards that are created breakdown scenes and how the camera will move.
- Texture artist: A video game artist who creates and applies textures (skins) to the work that has been created by the 3D modellers (polygon meshes). Often 2D/texture artists are the same people as the 3D modellers. The texture artist gives depth to the art in a video game, applying shading, gradients, and other classic art techniques through art development software.
- Sprite artist: A video game artist who creates non-static characters and objects or sprites for 2D games. Each sprite may consist of several frames used for animation.
- Map artist: A video game artist who creates static art assets for game levels and maps, such as environmental backdrops or terrain images for 2D games. Historically sometimes referred to as a background modeller.
- UI artist: A video game artist who works with engineering and design to produce a game interface, such as menus, HUDs, etc. Historically sometimes referred to as an Interface artist.

=== 3D artists ===
- 3D modeller: A video game artist who uses digital software (e.g. Maya, 3ds Max, Blender) to create characters, environments (such as buildings), and objects such as weapons and vehicles. Any 3D component of a game is created by a 3D modeller.
  - Environmental artist: A 3D modeller who works specifically to model the environment of a game. They also work with texturing and colours. They create the terrain that is featured in a video game. Environmental artists build the world, the layout, and the landscapes of the video game.
- Animator: A video game artist responsible for bringing life to the characters, the environment, and anything that moves in a game. They use 3D programs to animate these components to make the game as real as possible. The animators often work with technical artists who aid in making the characters able to move in a realistic way.
- Lighting artist: A video game artist who works on the light dynamics of a video game. Lighting artists adjust colours and brightness to add mood to the game. The lighting changes made in a video game depends on the type of game being created. The goal of the lighting artist is to create a mood that suits the scene and the game.

=== Technical artists ===
Technical art is a cross-discipline profession, and technical artists act as a bridge between the programming team and art direction. The discipline requires a diverse range of skills including tools development and programming, specialist rigging and physics, rendering, materials and VFX. The technical artist (TA) is responsible for directing the course of development in these areas to achieve a particular visual or look. It is often described as a problem solving role. Given its breadth, it is sometimes broken down into more specialised roles:

- Technical art director or lead technical artist: oversees a technical art team and also provides guidance to the rest of the art team. Provides direction for tools, techniques and workflow as well as technical standards for others.
- Shader artist or material artist: A role involving the development of shaders and materials using either graph based solutions or scripting languages. They may also contribute to VFX, and are responsible for optimization of shaders.
- Pipeline technical artist: A role which involves negotiation between technical and artistic disciplines, establishing working practices, building tools and ensuring that art content will meet the technical demands of the target platform.
- Rigger: a role which involves the rigging and skinning of characters, preparing them for animation. It may also involve specialised systems such as physics.
- VFX artist: a role which develops particle effects such as fire, splashes, lasers etc. This may also include creating cached simulations for expensive operations such as fluid work. By some definitions VFX is considered a separate role outside of the technical art discipline.

== Education ==
Many universities offer game art courses as a way to learn the profession in a formal setting. A few of these courses were available as early as the 1990s. However, more general art courses are also an avenue into the industry, and a number of professionals come from a more traditional art background. It is beneficial to seek out a game art degree for those intending to work in the industry, but it is not a requirement. Universities can offer tools and equipment, as well as offering an environment with other like-minded students. Princeton Review accredits games courses in the United States, while TIGA does this in the United Kingdom. TIGA also hosts an education conference annually for universities and game studios. University courses may also be required for artists who seek to work in another country. In the UK there are also BTECs available in game art for those seeking to move into a games course at university level. The Rookies maintains a global ranking of schools for the subject, though all games disciplines are considered a single category. The rankings are often dominated by for-profit organisations such as Gnomon School of Visual Effects.

Actually entering the industry is challenging even after completing a degree, due to a lack of sufficient entry level positions. Hiring a junior requires the studio to provide training to bring them up to speed, and this is a long term investment that studios are not typically willing to make. The proportion of junior jobs available was already low in 2022, but fell dramatically during the 2023-24 layoffs. In the UK, 9% of jobs available were junior level in 2022; this had fallen to under 3% by 2023 with only 34 junior jobs available nationwide over the entire year. Junior positions are often available only in outsourced roles, and even these can attract thousands of applications. This has contributed to structural issues with skills in the industry, as the focus on hiring only mid or senior positions for years has led to shortages of experienced staff. Additionally, many senior staff sought "greener pastures" in other creative industries amid the turmoil in games, and this further tightened the pool of available talent at the top end.

=== Technical artist shortage ===
There has been an industry wide shortage of technical artists since at least 2019, which is ongoing as of 2024. The shortage has been attributed to the difficulty of training them. The profession requires a broad set of skills, and training technical artists is "a long and time-consuming process". Dedicated technical arts courses do exist, though formal instruction through a specialised degree is not a common route for technical artists. Technical artist is not typically an entry level position at all; rather it is a role that an experienced artist or programmer will move towards later in their careers. In 2024 Skillfull called for the creation of an industry body to address skills shortages, particularly technical artists.

Technical artists are notoriously difficult to recruit due to the small candidate pool. A 2022 study found that technical art was the most in-demand art profession in the UK games industry. The shortage has also affected related industries such as animation, which are competing for the same pool of technical artists.

== Salary ==
There is a significant division among artist salaries based on discipline. Skillsearch found in 2024 that technical artists were paid more highly than any other art profession in the UK. At the mid level technical artists earn an average of over £60,000. At the senior level a technical artist can earn over £100,000. In the United States, the comparable figure for technical artists is $205,000 per year, rising to $297,000 at the higher end. This has been attributed to the hyper-competitive nature of acquiring a technical artist, given the shortage of them.

Bevan's salary data reports an average of £22,000 for 2D artists, rising to £37,500 at the senior level. For 3D artists the comparable figures are £28,000, rising to £35,000 at the senior level. The CEO of Silent Games Sally Blake has maintained a spreadsheet since 2022 which collates anonymously reported salaries from game developers in the UK and Ireland; the full data set is publicly available.

== See also ==
- Game development
- Video game design
- Video game graphics
- Texture artist
