= UVW =

UVW may refer to:

- The CIE 1964 color space, often abbreviated as UVW
- Unie van Waterschappen, an umbrella organization for Dutch water boards
- United Vehicle Workers, a former trade union in Britain (1919 - 1922)
- United Voices of the World, an independent grassroots trade union in Britain
- Universitätsverlag Wagner, an Austrian academic publisher
- UVW mapping, a mathematical technique for coordinate mapping
- University of Virginia's College at Wise, a public liberal arts college in Wise, Virginia
- Unloaded Vehicle Weight, the weight of a vehicle as manufactured at the factory
