= Tomás Ó Cobhthaigh =

Irish poet in the 15th century

Tomás Ó Cobhthaigh (died 1474) was an Irish poet.

Ó Cobhthaigh was a member of a brehon family from County Westmeath. The Annals of the Four Masters contain his obit, sub anno 1474.

- Thomas, the son of Donnell O'Coffey, died.

== See also ==
- Charles Coffey (died 1745)
- Aeneas Coffey (1780–1852)
- William Coffey (VC) (1829–1875)
- Brian Coffey (1905–1995)
