= Cofie =

Cofie is a surname. Notable people with the surname include:

- Ethel Delali Cofie, Ghanaian IT professional, entrepreneur and consultant
- Isaac Cofie (born 1991), Ghanaian footballer
- Jacob Cofie (born 2006), American basketball player
- Joe Cofie (born 1946), Ghanaian boxer
- John Cofie (born 1993), Ghanaian-born British footballer

== See also ==
- Coffee (disambiguation)
- Coffey (disambiguation)
- Coffie, a surname
