= Coffi =

Coffi is a given name. Notable people with the name include:

- Coffi Agbessi (born 1985), Beninese footballer
- Coffi Roger Anoumou (born 1972), Beninese Roman Catholic bishop
- Coffi Codjia (born 1967), Beninese football referee

== See also ==
- Ffa Coffi Pawb, band
