= Tritonville Road =

Road in Dublin, Ireland

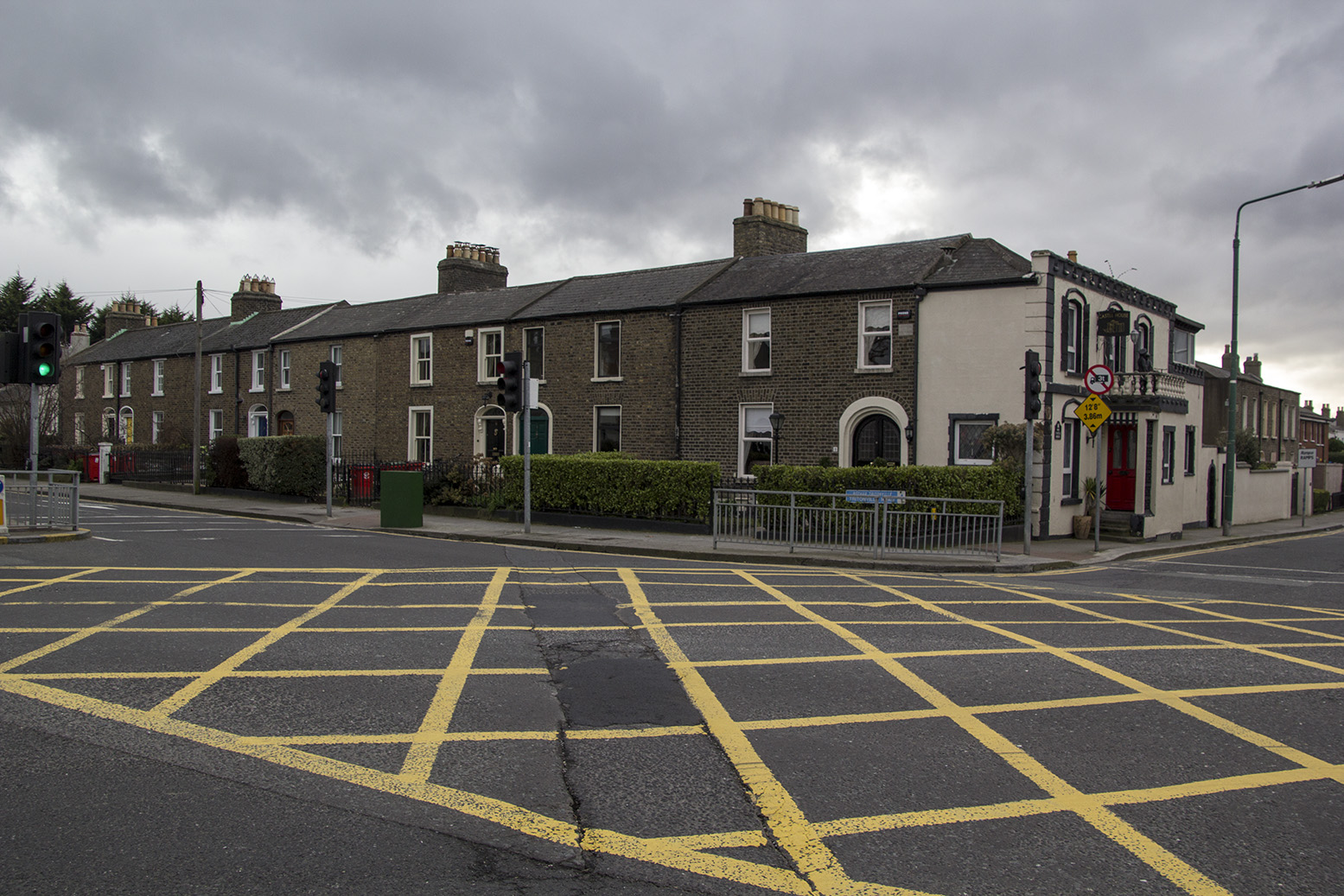
- Tritonville Road

- Location within Dublin
- Native name: Bóthar Tritonville (Irish)
- Namesake: Tritonville baths
- Length: 650 m (2,130 ft)
- Width: 12 metres (39 ft)
- Location: Sandymount, Dublin, Ireland
- Postal code: D04
- Coordinates: 53.333944°N 6.2218°W
- north end: Irishtown Road
- south end: Roundabout meeting with Serpentine Avenue, Serpentine Road, Claremont Avenue

Construction
- Inauguration: 1836

Other
- Known for: Mention in Ulysses

Tritonville Road (Irish: Bóthar Tritonville), Sandymount, Dublin 4, is connected to Lansdowne Road by both Herbert Road and Newbridge Avenue. At its southern end, it meets Serpentine Avenue. The northern side of Tritonville Road is considered to be part of Irishtown by the locals even though the postcode is Sandymount.

The street takes its name from the Tritonville baths, established by Richard Cranfield in the late 18th century; these were in turn named after the sea-god Triton.

In Ulysses, the funeral of Paddy Dignam passes along here and continues on to Glasnevin Cemetery via Irishtown.

== See also ==
- List of streets and squares in Dublin
