= Tadhg Ó Cobhthaigh =

Irish poet (fl. 1554)

- Occupation: Poet
- Relatives: Aedh
- Writing career
- Period: 1554
- Notable work: Crann seoil na cruinne an chroch naomtha

Tadhg Ó Cobhthaigh (fl. 1554.) was an Irish poet.

Ó Cobhthaigh was a member of a hereditary bardic family based in what is now County Westmeath. All that is known of his parents is that his father's name was Aedh.

Among his know surviving works is Crann seoil na cruinne an chroch naomtha (The holy cross is the mast of the world) and a lament of one hundred verses on the death of King of Uí Failghe, Brian mac Cathaoir Ó Conchubhair Fáilghe (reigned c. 1525-c. 1556).

A third poem - Cia re ccuirfinn sed suirghe - in praise of Manus mac Aodh Dubh Ó Domhnaill is ascribed to him. It consists of twenty stanzas, which won him the gift of a mare for each stanza from Ó Domhnaill.

He appears to be the same man that Captain Francis O'Neill, apparently incorrectly, associates with Geoffrey Keating (c.1569-1643). Or perhaps a latter man of the same name. O'Neill attributes the following verses to Keating, concerning Ó Cobhthaigh:

Who is the artist by whom the cruit is player?
By whom the anguish of the envenomed spear’s recent would is healed,
through the sweet-voiced sound of the sounding-board, like the sweet~streamed peal of the organ?
Who is it that plays the enchanting music that dispels all the ills that man is heir to?
Tadhg O’Cobthaigh of beauteous form, -
The chief-beguiler of women,
The intelligent concordance of all difficult tunes,
The thrills of music and of harmony.

== See also ==
- Aedh Ó Cobhthaigh, died 1452.
- Murchadh Bacagh Ó Cobhthaigh, died 1478.

== Sources ==
- Ó Cobhthaigh family, pp. 435–436, in Oxford Dictionary of National Biography, volume 41, Norbury-Osbourne, September 2004.
