= Murchadh Bacagh Ó Cobhthaigh =

Irish poet

- Died: 1478
- Occupation: Poet
- Writing career
- Language: Irish

Murchadh Bacagh Ó Cobhthaigh, Irish poet, died 1478.

Ó Cobhthaigh was a member of a hereditary bardic family based in what is now County Westmeath. His obit in the Annals of the Four Masters describe him as an ollamh, a professor of poetry, indicating that his verses were very highly regarded. No examples of his work is known to survive.

== See also ==
- An Clasach Ó Cobhthaigh, died 1415.
- Aedh Ó Cobhthaigh, died 1452.
