= Robert Sastre =

Beninese clergyman and bishop

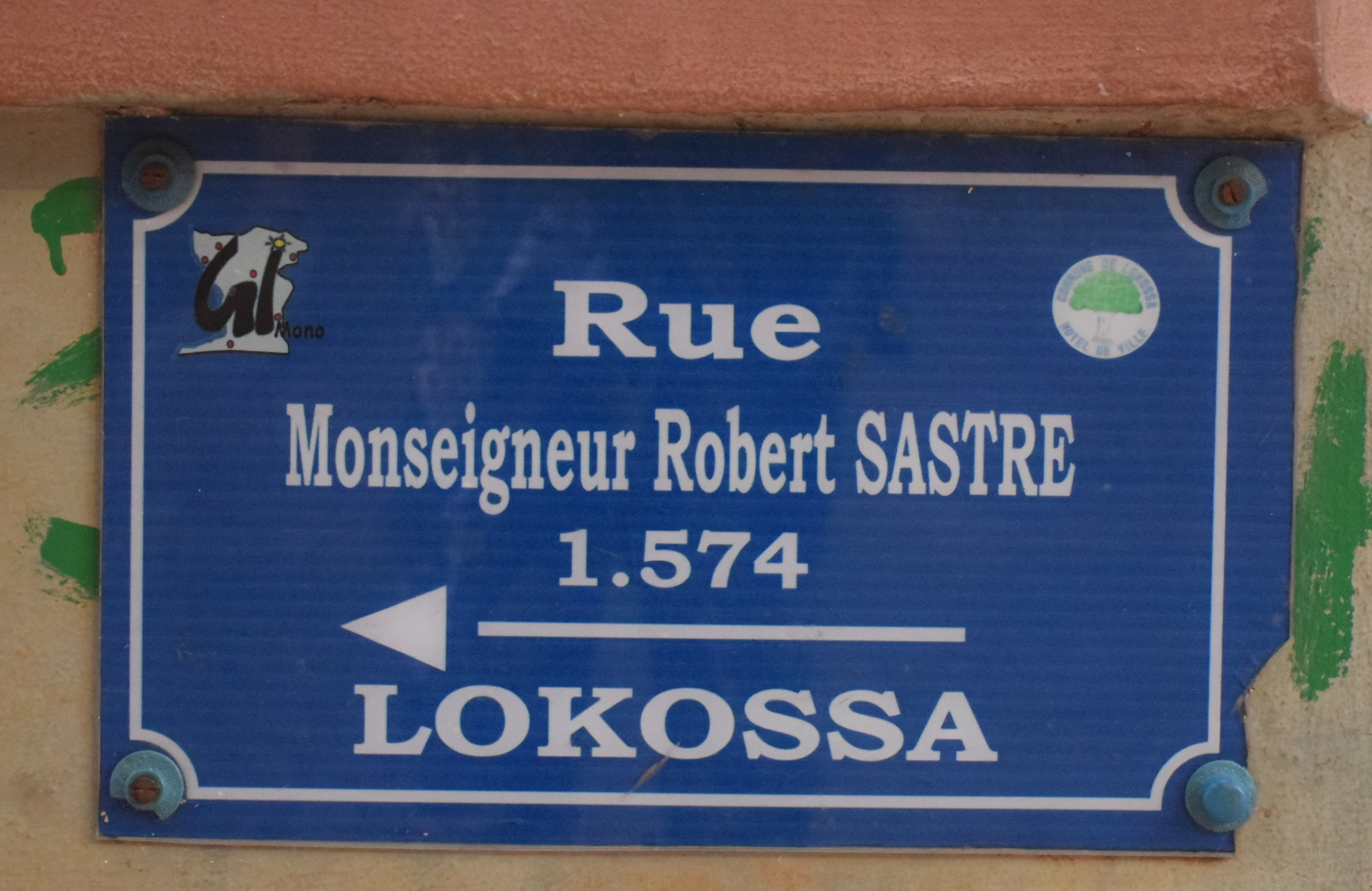
Street of Saint-Pierre-Claver Cathedral in Lokossa, Benin

Robert Sastre (born 7 Jun 1926 in Grand-Popo; died 2000) was a Beninese clergyman and bishop for the Roman Catholic Diocese of Lokossa. He became ordained in 1952 and was appointed bishop in 1972.
