= John Coffey =

John Coffey may refer to:

== People ==
- John Coffey (historian), professor of early modern history at the University of Leicester
- John Louis Coffey (1922–2012), U.S. federal judge
- John Coffey (hurler) (1918–2019), Irish hurler
- John B. Coffey (1921–2013), retired Lieutenant Colonel in the USAAF
- John W. Coffey (born 1954), American author and art historian
- Sean Coffey (John P. Coffey, born 1956), lawyer, candidate for New York Attorney General
- Jack Coffey (baseball) (1887–1966), baseball infielder for Boston Doves, Detroit Tigers and Boston Red Sox
- Jack Coffey (television director) (1927–2014), American television director
- Jack Coffey (footballer) (1929–2007), Australian rules football player for St Kilda
- Jack Coffey (rugby union)

== Other ==
- John Coffey, a character in the Stephen King novel The Green Mile and the subsequent film
- John Coffey (band), a Dutch band

== See also ==
- John Coffee (disambiguation)
