= Dodderbank distillery =

Former distillery in Dublin, Ireland

Dodderbank Distillery
- Location: Dublin, Ireland
- Owner: Haig family
- Founded: 1795
- Founder: Robert Haig
- Status: Closed
- Demolished: c. 1840s

The Dodderbank Distillery was owned by the Haig family. It was founded in 1795 by Robert Haig (1764-1834), whose sister had married John Jameson.

By 1802 it was one of the largest distilleries in Dublin. The distillery was forced to close by the Revenue Commissioners, and was then bought by Aeneas Coffey, who ran it until the 1840s. The site was then purchased by a builder who built housing along Newbridge Avenue.
