= Aeneas Coffey =

Irish inventor and distiller (1780–1839)

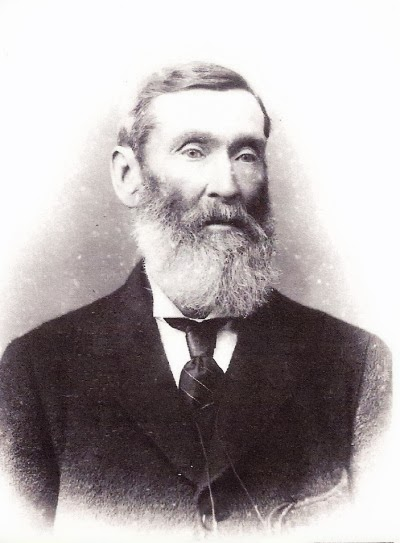

Inspector General of Excise
- In office 1816–1824

Surveyor of Excise for Clonmel and Wicklow
- In office 1815–1816

Sub-commissioner of Inland Excise and Taxes
- In office 1813–1815

Personal details
- Born: 1780
- Died: 1852 (aged 71–72)
- Education: Trinity College Dublin
- Occupation: Inventor; distiller

Aeneas Coffey (c. 1780 – 26 November 1852) was an Irish excise official, inventor and distiller. He is known for patenting the Coffey still, which is named after him, and which remains widely used globally.

== Biography ==
Aeneas Coffey was born circa 1780, likely in Ireland—either County Dublin or County Wicklow—or possibly in Calais, France, to Irish parents. He was the son of Andrew Coffey, a distinguished Dublin city water engineer trained under James Dinwiddie, who installed much of Dublin's cast-iron water piping.

Though details about Aeneas Coffey's early education are scarce, he is believed to have attended some classes at Trinity College Dublin before entering the excise service around 1800 as a gauger.

In 1808, he married Susanna Logie and the two had four sons: Aeneas, Philip, William and Andrew.

Coffey's excise career advanced steadily: from sub-commissioner of Inland Excise and Taxes at Drogheda (1813–1815), to surveyor of excise for Clonmel and Wicklow (1815–1816), then Cork (1816). By 1818, he was acting Inspector General of Excise for Ireland, a post officially confirmed in Dublin by 1820.

His time in Donegal was marked by conflict, including a violent attack by illicit distillers in 1810, reflecting the tense relationship between excisemen and communities reliant on moonshining.

Coffey resigned as Inspector General in March 1824 and soon invested in land, purchasing 800 acres in County Kildare in 1828.

Post-resignation, he turned to the distilling business, managing Dublin distilleries and patenting his innovative continuous column still in 1830.

By the mid-1830s, Coffey relocated to London, maintaining a Dublin office until 1856, while his still design gained international adoption, particularly in Scotland.

Coffey died on 26 November 1852 in Bromley, Middlesex, England.

== Customs and excise career ==
Coffey served as sub-commissioner of Inland Excise and Taxes for Drogheda from 1813. He became Surveyor of Excise for Clonmel and Wicklow in 1815, then for Cork in 1816. By 1818, he was Acting Inspector General of Excise for Ireland, eventually becoming Inspector General in Dublin by 1820.

He advocated for action against illegal distillers and smugglers, particularly in County Donegal and western Ireland, where moonshining was prevalent. Between 1820 and 1824, he provided evidence to Parliamentary Commissions on distilling matters. His 1822 report gained support from Irish distillers.

Coffey helped draft the 1823 Excise Act, which legalized distillation under license (£10 fee plus spirit duty). The Act established a unified Board of Excise for the UK and created assistant commissioner roles for Scotland and Ireland.

== Inventions ==
Coffey's education and excise work influenced his understanding of still design. In early 19th-century Ireland, which was then the global whiskey leader, he studied alternatives to traditional pot stills. Though County Cork distillers had patented a column still in 1822, it remained unsuccessful.

Changing the design by enhancing vapor recirculation, creating a more efficient still that produced lighter, higher-alcohol spirits, Coffey patented his design in 1830.

While Irish distillers largely rejected it, Scottish and English producers adopted it for Scotch whisky and gin production.

== Distilling business ==
After retiring, Coffey entered the distilling industry, managing Dublin's Dodder Bank Distillery and Dock Distillery before founding Aeneas Coffey Whiskey Company in 1830. His still design significantly improved production efficiency and reportedly revolutionized global distilling.

== See also ==
- Ó Cobhthaigh – Gaelic surname Anglicized as Coffey or Coffee
- List of inventions named after people
- List of Trinity College Dublin people
