= Cornelius O'Brien (piper) =

Cornelius O'Brien (fl. 1656), Irish musician.

O'Brien is one of the few Irish musicians noted in the 17th century. A piper, in 1656 he was "Sentenced to receive twenty lashes on the bare back" and transported to Barbados.

== See also ==
- Tadhg Ó Cobhthaigh, poet and musician, fl. 1554.
- Donell Dubh Ó Cathail, musician, c. 1560s – c.1660.
- Cearbhall Óg Ó Dálaigh, poet and musician, fl. 1630.
- David Murphy (composer), composer and harper, fl. early 17th century.
