= Herbert Road =

Road in Ballsbridge, Ireland

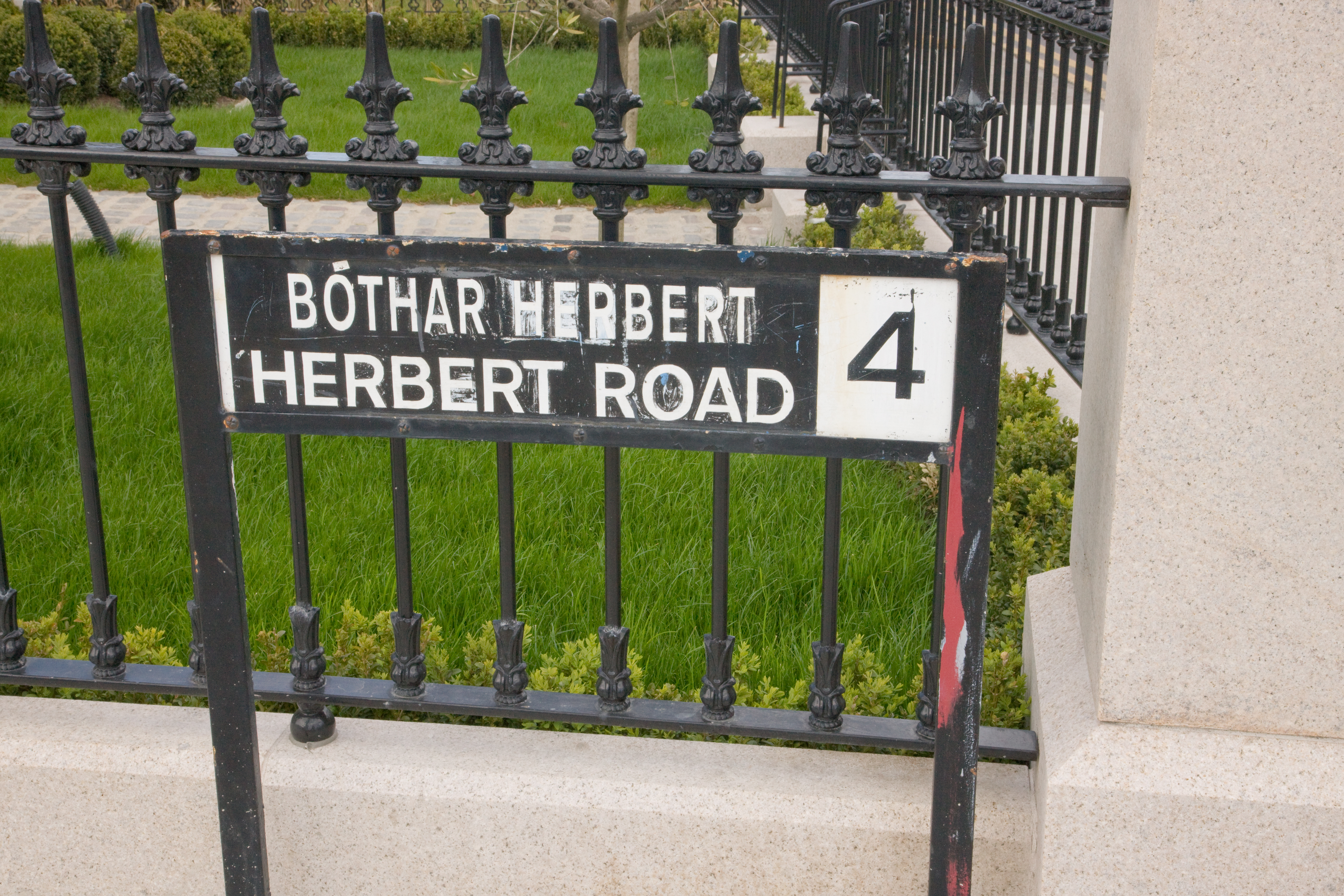
- Herbert Road street sign

- Location within Dublin
- Native name: Bóthar Hoirbeaird (Irish)
- Namesake: Sidney Herbert, 1st Baron Herbert of Lea
- Length: 250 m (820 ft)
- Width: 17 metres (56 ft)
- Location: Ballsbridge, Dublin, Ireland
- Postal code: D04
- Coordinates: 53.3336°N 6.224°W
- west end: Lansdowne Road, New Bridge
- east end: Tritonville Road

Other
- Known for: Hotels

Herbert Road (Irish: Bóthar Hoirbeaird) in Ballsbridge, Ireland is a mostly residential road that links Tritonville Road with Lansdowne Road. Newbridge Avenue joins by the bridge, in front of Marian College and the former site of Sandymount High School next door. There are several hotels on the road. Noteworthy is the Mount Herbert Hotel which is a conversion of a terrace of stately homes. The road extends to the roundabout at the junction, which is part of Lansdowne Road. Both this road and Newbridge Avenue, are built on the former site of Haigs' distillery.

The house at 14 Herbert Road sold for €2.41m in February 2004, setting a record price for a house on this road.

== See also ==
- List of streets and squares in Dublin
