= Isle aux Herbes =

Barrier island in the Mississippi Sound

Coordinates: 30°20′37″N 88°15′24″W

Isle aux Herbes, also known as Coffee Island, is a barrier island located in the Mississippi Sound south of downtown Bayou la Batre, Alabama. It is a 29-acre (120,000 m^{2}), state-owned and tidally inundated island.

The island is an important site for colonial nesting shorebirds in coastal Alabama.
