= Coffie =

Coffie is a surname and occasional given name. Notable people with this name include:

- Boyd Coffie (1937–2006), American baseball player
- Calton Coffie (1954–2023), Jamaican vocalist
- Eddie Coffie (1959–2015), Ghanaian actor
- Florence Oboshie Sai-Coffie (born 1953), Ghanaian politician and media executive
- Francis Coffie (born 1989), Ghanaian footballer
- Ivanon Coffie (born 1977), Dutch baseball player from Curaçao
- Raymonde Coffie (born 1965), Ivorian politician
- Michael Coffie Boampong (1962–2018), Ghanaian accountant and politician
- Sunday Mbang (Sunday Coffie Mbang) (1936–2023), Nigerian Methodist prelate

== See also ==
- Coffee (surname)
- Coffey (surname)
- Cofie, a surname
