= Maeleachlainn Ó Cobhthaigh =

Irish poet

- Died: 1429
- Writing career
- Genre: Poetry

Maeleachlainn Ó Cobhthaigh, Irish poet, died 1429.

A son of An Clasach Ó Cobhthaigh (died 1415) and a brother of Domhnall Ó Cobhthaigh (died 1446), Ó Cobhthaigh was a member of a hereditary bardic family. He was killed by Edmond Dalton, who had conquered his district.
