= Coffee Swamp =

Swamp and state natural area in Door County, Wisconsin

Coordinates: 45.404°N 86.890°W

Coffey Swamp is a freshwater swamp located on the northern edge of Washington Island, in Door County Wisconsin and is a designated state natural area since 1994. At the center of the swamp is a small, shallow pond.

The swamp represents a boreal forest, and hosts a number of plant species including various sedges, ferns and other rare plants. Snowberry, round-leaved sundew, and pitcher plants grow in small mounded areas of sphagnum moss under some of the cedars.

== Climate ==
Coffey Swamp

Climate chart (precipitation, max. and min. temperature)
J	F	M	A	M	J	J	A	S	O	N	D
66 −4 −9	60 −10 −14	62 0 −5	112 3 −1	86 9 3	77 12 10	96 18 16	73 17 15	109 16 14	119 9 7	110 6 4	66 2 1
- █ Average max. and min. temperatures in °C
- █ Precipitation totals in mm
Imperial conversion
J	F	M	A	M	J	J	A	S	O	N	D
2.6 25 16	2.4 14 7	2.4 32 23	4.4 37 30	3.4 48 37	3 54 50	3.8 64 61	2.9 63 59	4.3 61 57	4.7 48 45	4.3 43 39	2.6 36 34
- █ Average max. and min. temperatures in °F
- █ Precipitation totals in inches

== Gallery ==
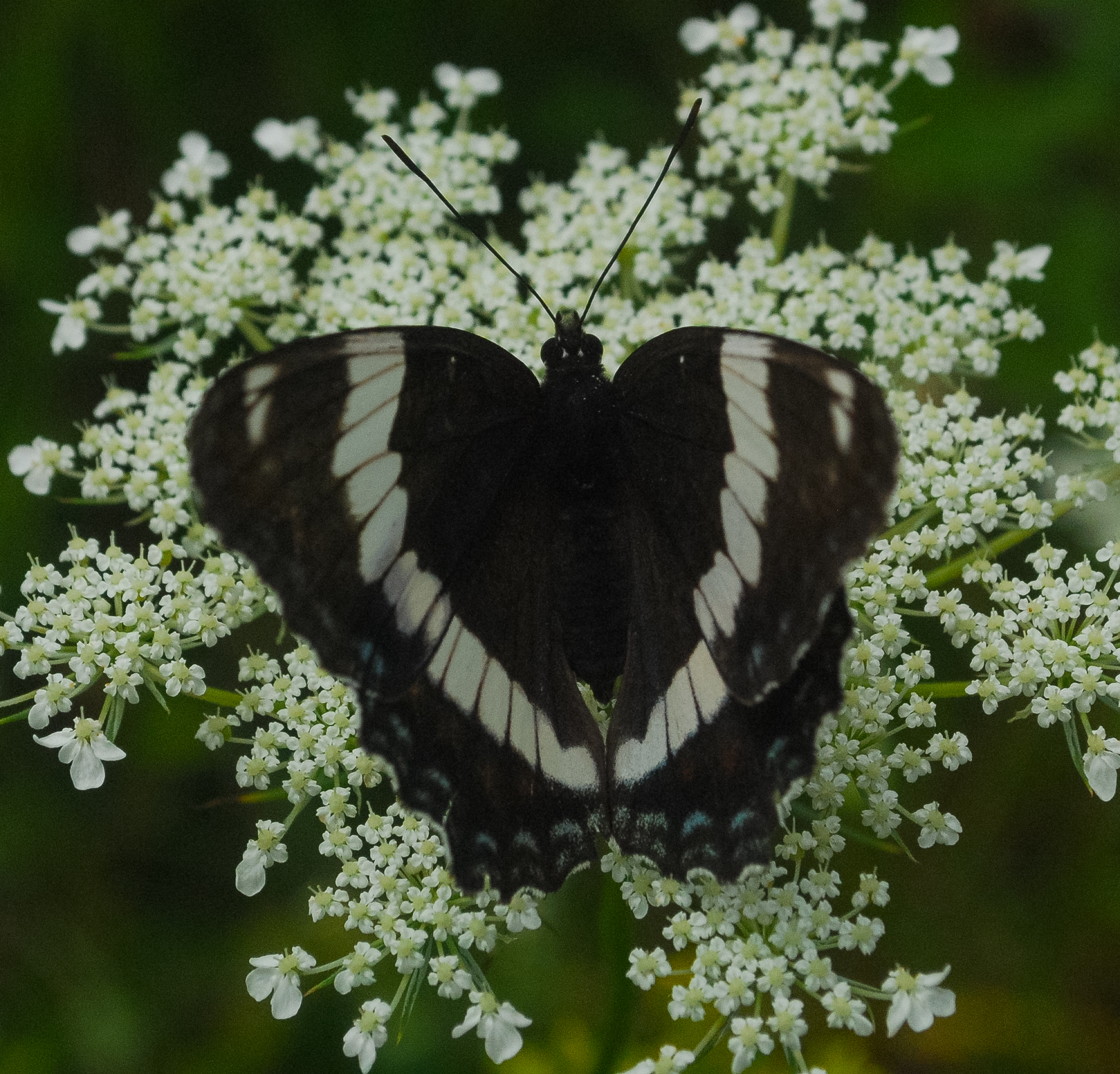
White admiral on Queen Anne's lace

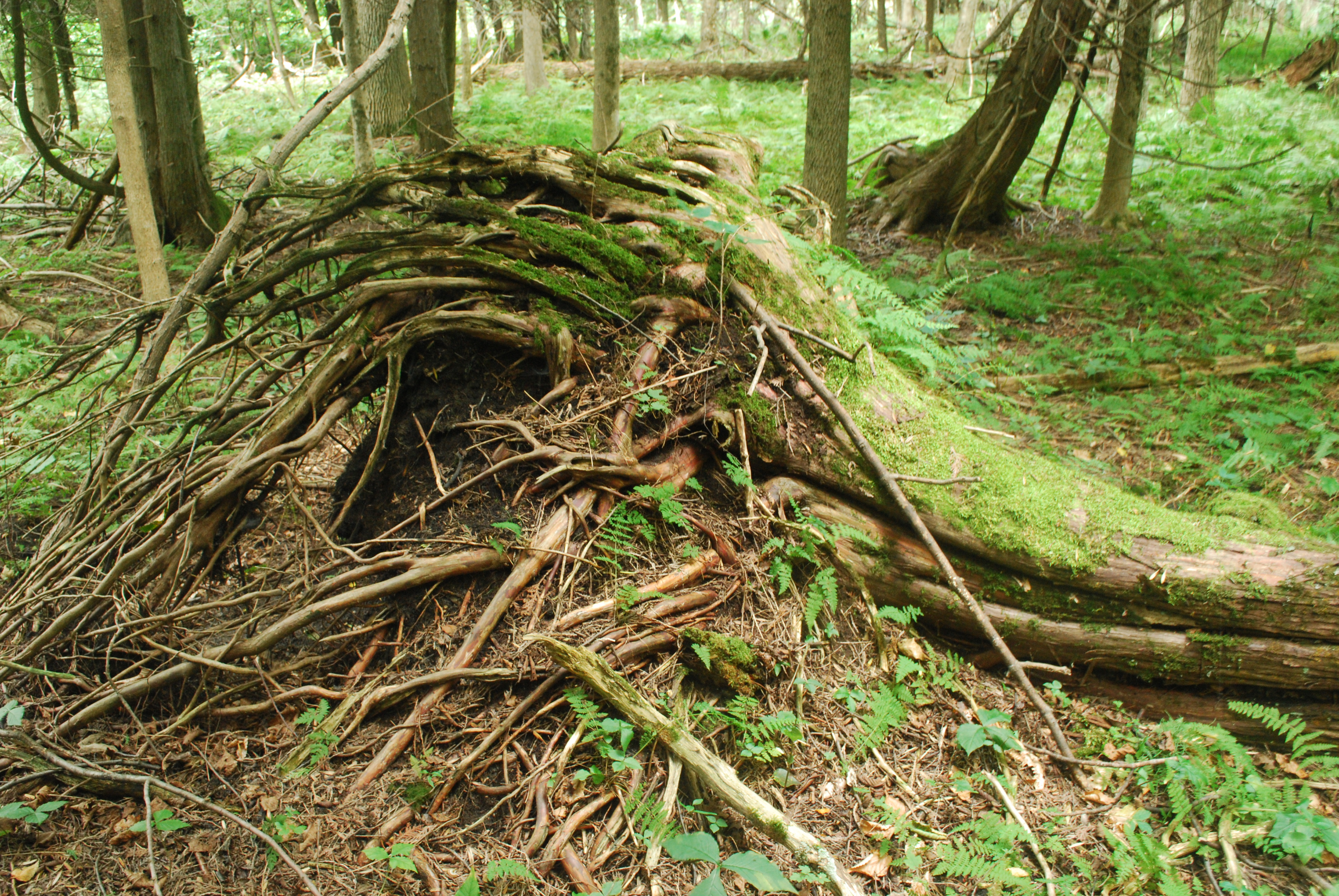
Root ball of a fallen tree

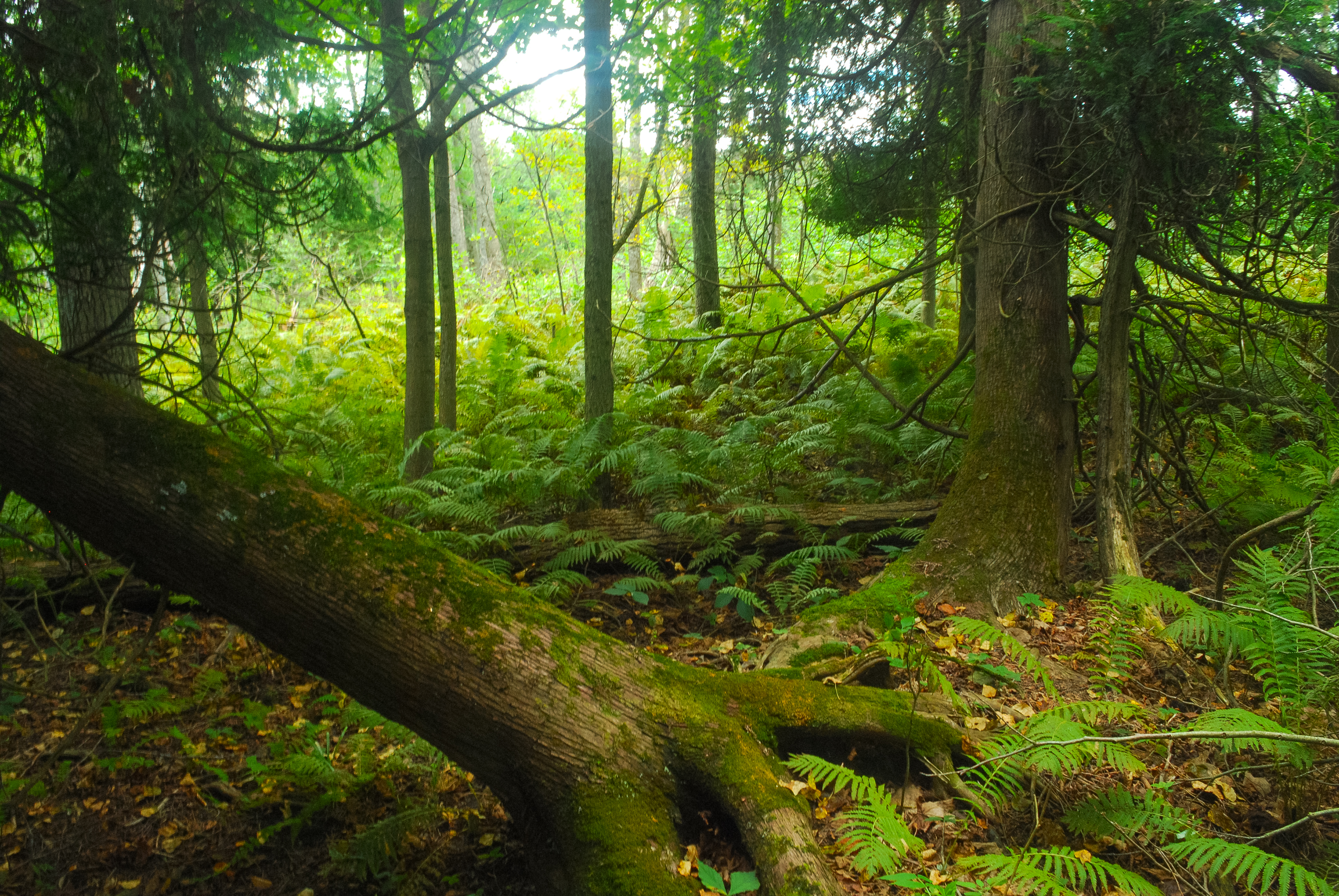
White cedars

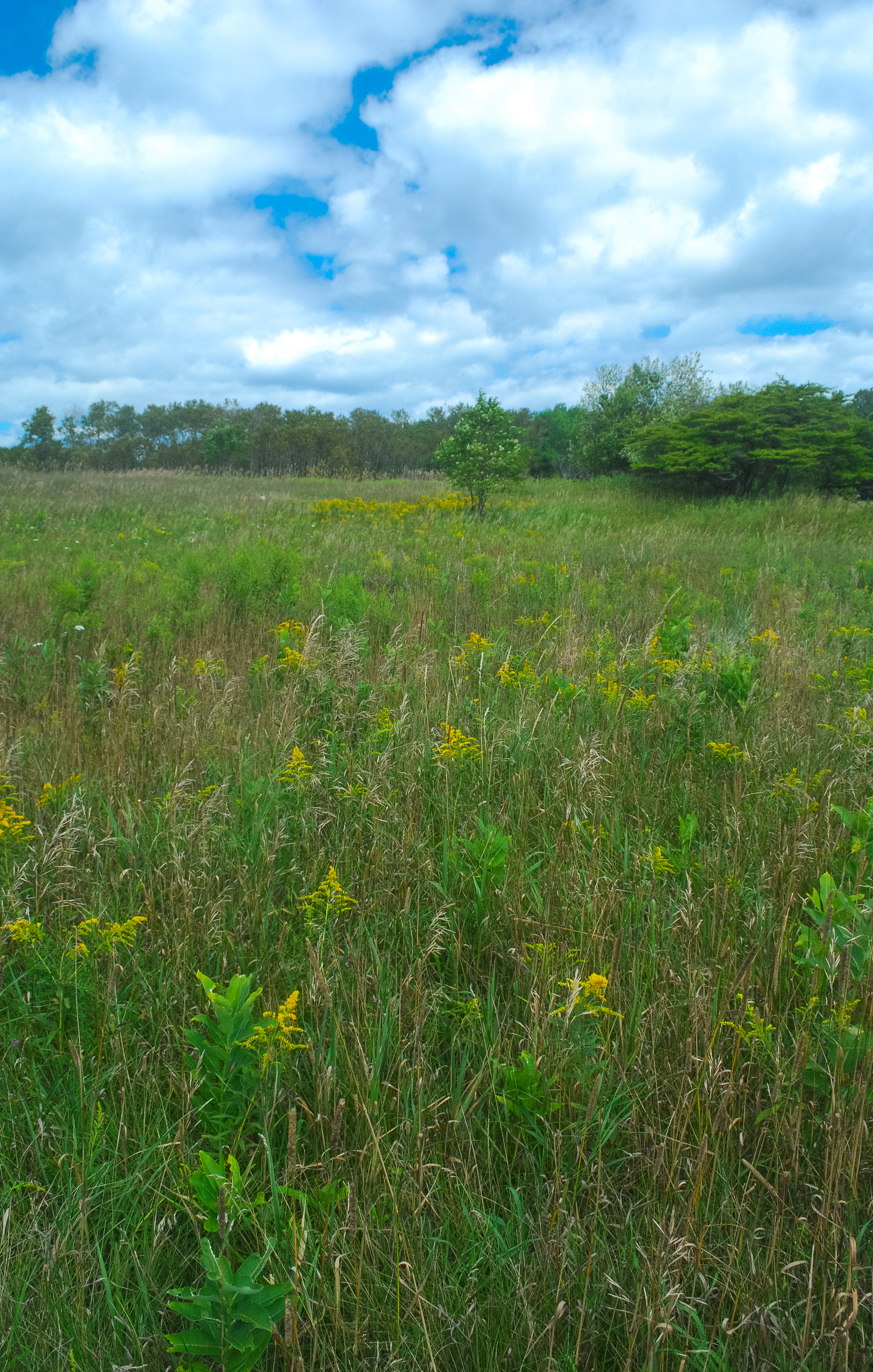
Grassy area with goldenrod

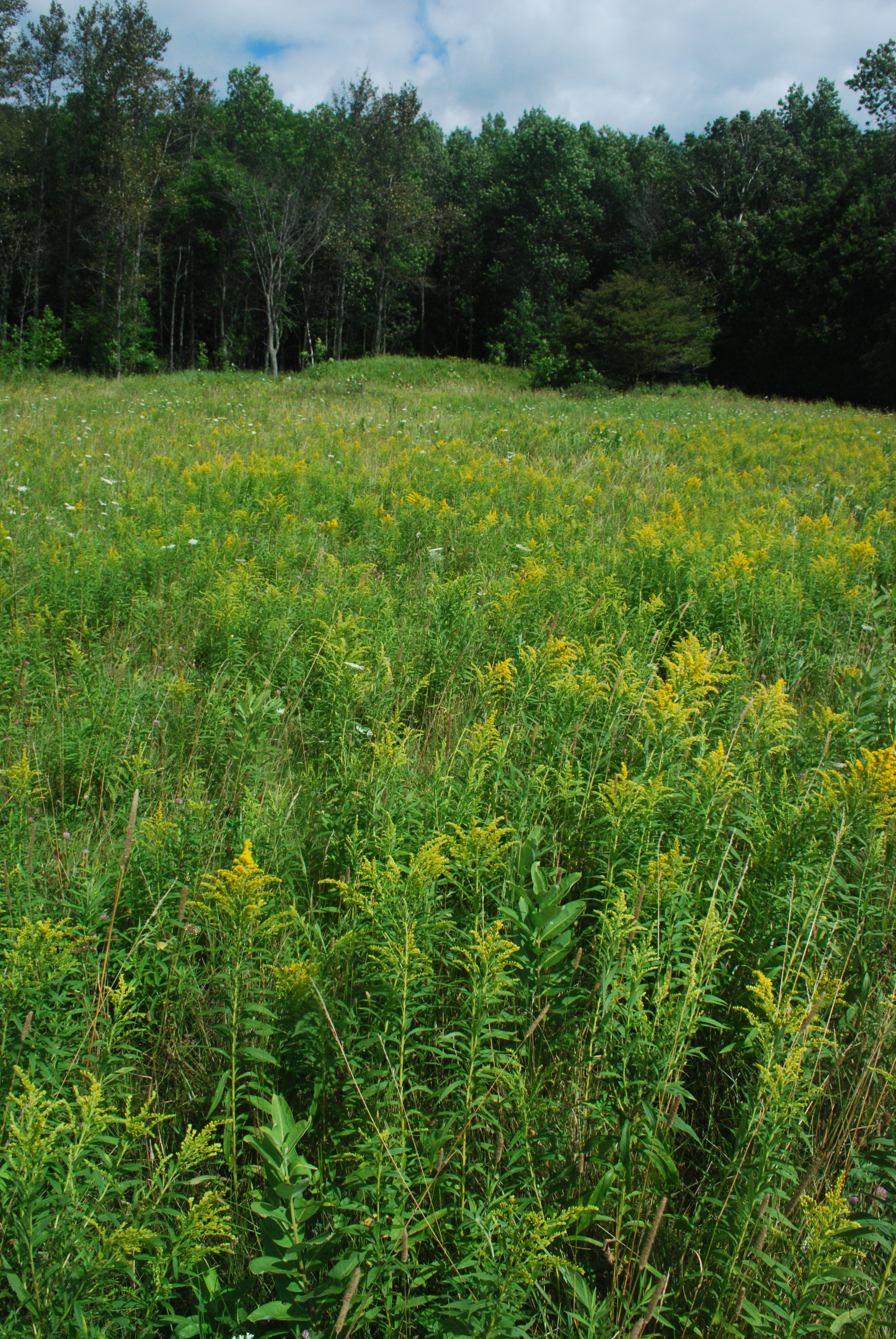
Meadow

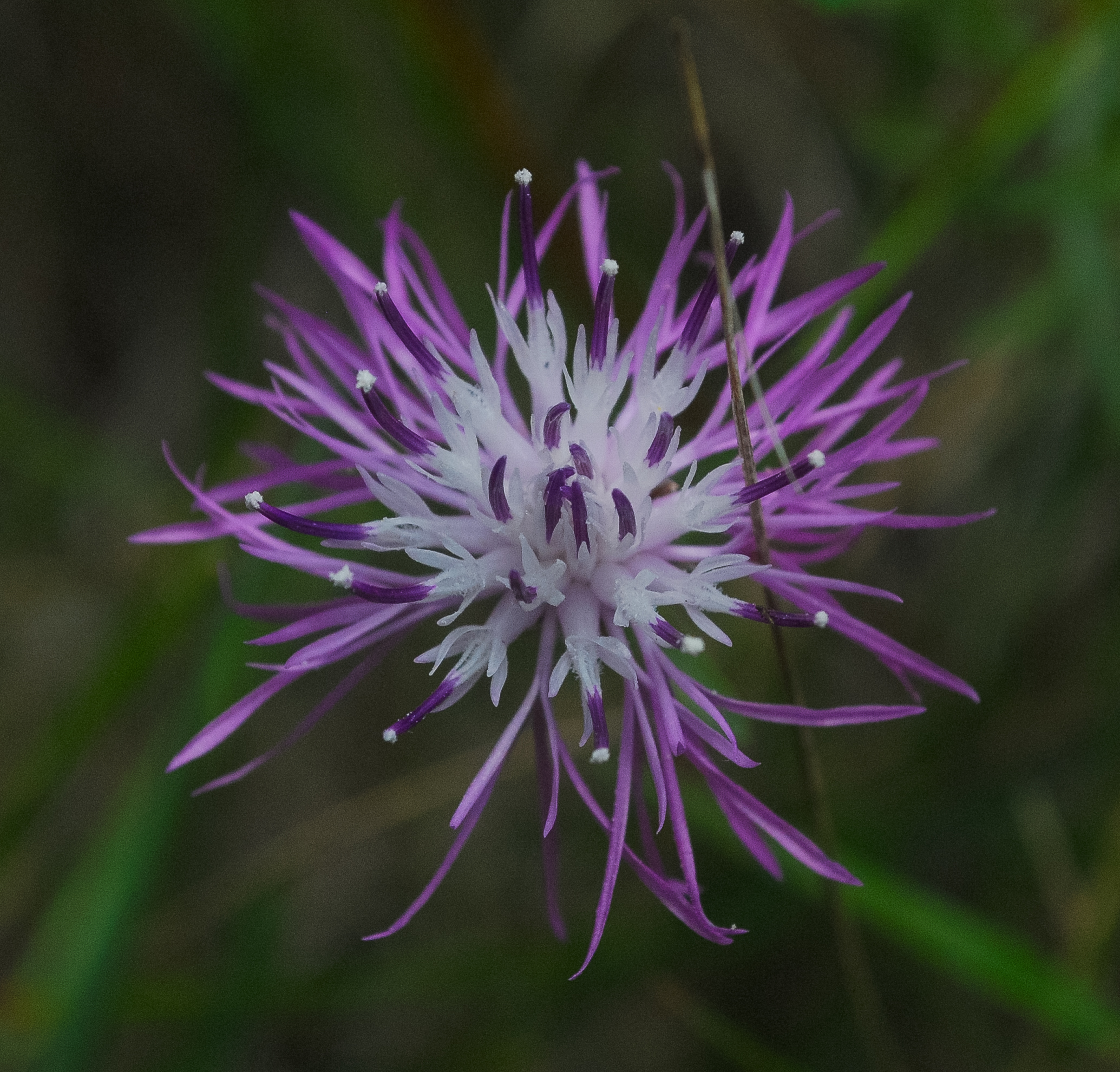
Spotted knapweed

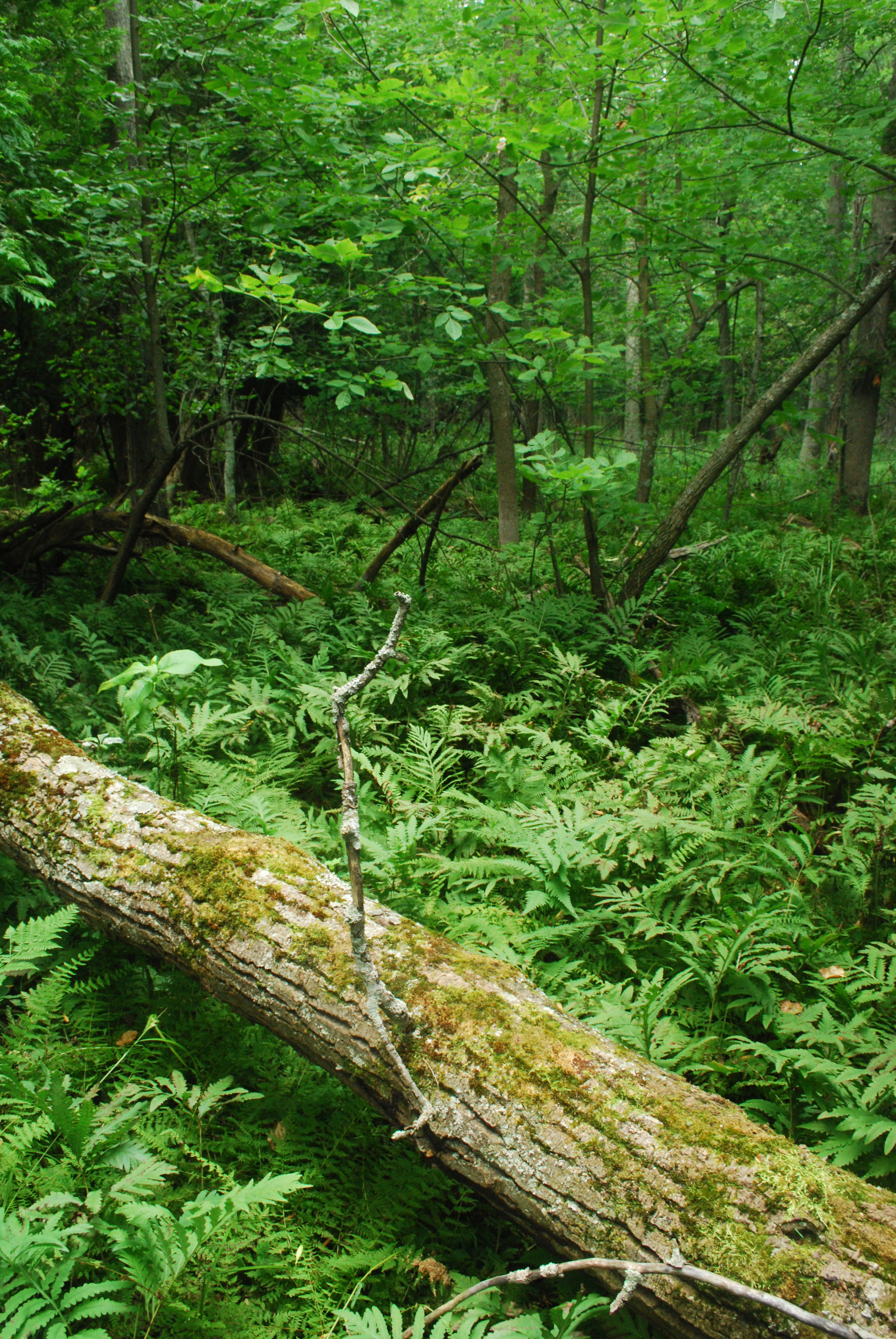
Ferns
