= Texture artist =

Digital artist

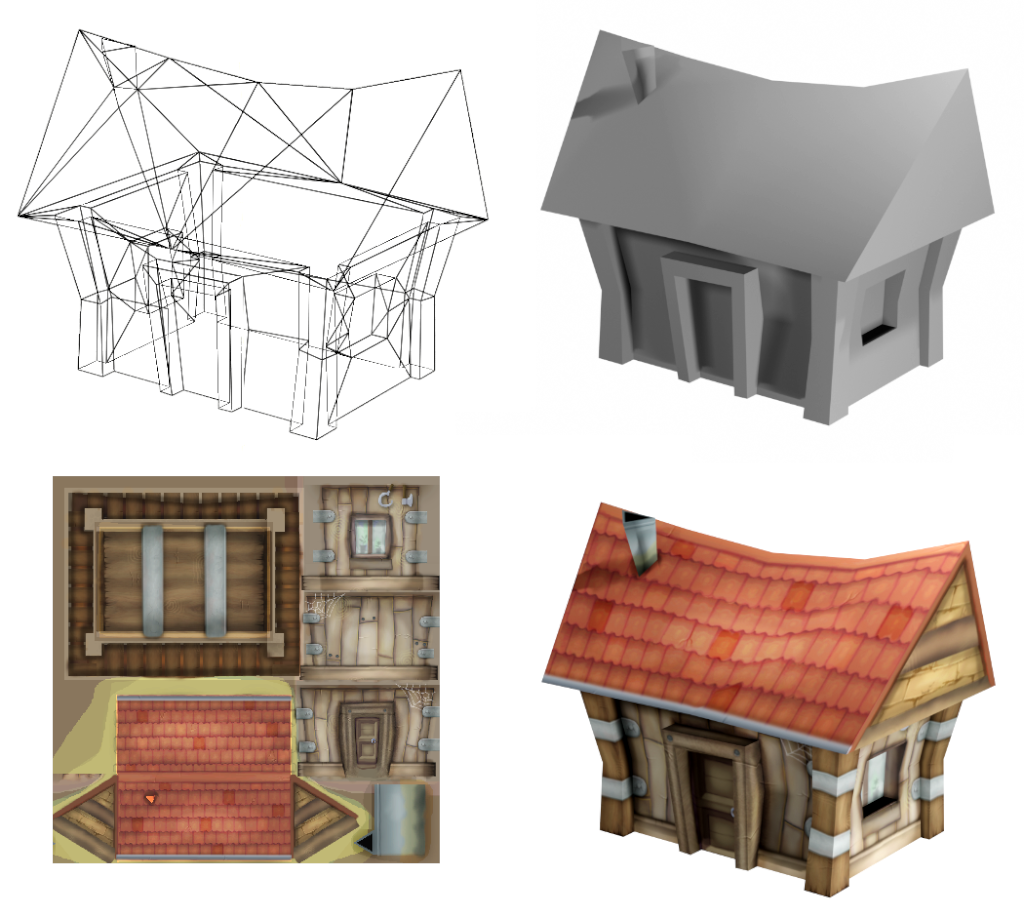
Textures applied to a digital model of a house

A texture artist is an individual who develops textures for digital media, usually for video games, movies, web sites and television shows or things like 3D posters. These textures can be in the form of 2D or (rarely) 3D art that may be overlaid onto a polygon mesh to create a realistic 3D model.

Texture artists often take advantage of web sites for the purposes of marketing their art and self-promotion of their skills with the goal of gaining employment from a professional game studio or to join a team working on a "mod" (modification) of an existing game in hopes of establishing industry or trade credentials.

== See also ==
- Digital art
- Texture map
- UV map
- UVW map
- Normal mapping
