= FCurve =

Computer animation

An FCurve (also written f-curve) is a function curve or the graph of a function. An example of a FCurve is a spline.

In the field of computer animation and especially in animation editors, e.g. Maya, an FCurve is an animation curve with a set of keyframes, which are represented as points, curve segments between keys, and tangents that control how curve segments enter and exit a key. These keys are laid out on a graph that displays their position relative to zero. One can have keys that are either positive or negative values.

This visual graph of keyframes allows one to see the value of the key and its interpolation to the next key, which shows the animation "ease ins" and "ease outs".

F-Curves support various interpolation methods, including:

- Linear Interpolation: Creates a straight line between keyframes, resulting in uniform motion.
- Bézier Interpolation: Provides smooth transitions by allowing control over the tangents, enabling more complex motion profiles.
- Custom Interpolation: Animators can manipulate the curve manually to achieve specific motion dynamics, such as quick starts or slow finishes, by adjusting the handles of the Bézier curves
