= Virginia Coffey =

American social reformer and activist (1904–2003)

- Born: Virginia Keys Jones; December 14, 1904; Wheeling, West Virginia
- Died: December 26, 2003 (aged 99)
- Burial place: Spring Grove Cemetery, Cincinnati, Ohio
- Education: Western Michigan University; University of Cincinnati; Case Western Reserve University
- Spouse: William A. Coffey
- Parents: Edward Jones (father); Mary Jones (mother)

Virginia Coffey (1904–2003), was an American social reformer and civil rights activist who worked for improved race relations in and around Cincinnati, Ohio. She advised and directed several organisations during her career, including a variety of boards and committees.

== Early life ==
Virginia Keys Jones was born to Edward and Mary Jones in Wheeling, West Virginia on December 14, 1904. The family moved to Grand Rapids, Michigan, when Virginia was four years old in order to ensure that she would attend an integrated school. In the 1920s, she moved to Cincinnati, Ohio, to teach at Stowe School, the first all-black school in the city. She sought to leave the city, because of the segregation she saw, but was encouraged to stay and join the local branch of the National Association for the Advancement of Colored People by Ted Berry. After working as a teacher for a few more years, she chose to dedicate herself fully to working for racial equality.

=== Education ===
She attended Western Michigan University, where she graduated with a degree in education. Virginia was a member of the Alpha Kappa Alpha sorority. She later attended the University of Cincinnati where she studied sociology. Virginia was awarded a master's degree from the Cleveland-based Case Western Reserve University. She was made an honorary Doctor of Law by Xavier University in 1972.

== Political activism ==
She was secretary of the Young Women's Christian Association's West End chapter between 1926 and 1931, becoming the executive director afterwards. Virginia married William A. Coffey in the 1940s, afterwards forming the first Girl Scouts troop for African-American girls. In 1948, she was named Deputy Director of the Mayor of Cincinnati's Friendly Relations Committee, a position she held until 1962 when she left to be community relations supervisor for Seven Hills Neighborhood Houses for the following three years. While on the Friendly Relations Committee, Virginia worked to help integrate parts of the city. This included the swimming pools from 1950 onwards, and the Coney Island amusement park in 1961.

Virginia advised several industrial cities in the UK in 1963, helping them to manage community tensions caused by large numbers of immigrants from the West Indies. Between 1965 and 1968, she was director of the Memorial Community Center and became a human relations consultant for the University of Cincinnati. Virginia was on the board of the Hamilton County Welfare Department, as well as the president's council of Xavier University. She became executive director of the Cincinnati Human Relations Commission between 1968 and 1973. Virginia retired in 1978.

== Awards and recognition ==
Virginia Coffrey was named an Enquirer Woman of the Year in 1968. In Cincinnati, she received the Governor’s Award for Community Action in 1973, the Good Neighbor Award in 1989, and the Great Living Cincinnatian Award in 1993.
