= Toffler =

Toffler is a surname. Notable people with the surname include:

- Alvin Toffler (1928–2016), American writer and futurist
- Larry Toffler (born 1963), American game show host and actor
- Van Toffler (born 1958), American television executive
