= Toffolo =

Toffolo is a surname. Notable people with the surname include:

- Davide Toffolo (born 1965), Italian comic books writer
- Didier Toffolo (born 1959), French football player and manager
- Georgia Toffolo (born 1994) British television personality
- Harry Toffolo (born 1995), English football player
- Lino Toffolo (1934-2016), Italian actor and singer
