= COFFEE (Cinema 4D) =

Computer scripting language

COFFEE (often written as "C.O.F.F.E.E") was a computer scripting language that forms part of CINEMA 4D, a proprietary 3D graphics application.
