= Coffee County =

Coffee County is the name of several counties in the United States:

- Coffee County, Alabama
- Coffee County, Georgia
- Coffee County, Tennessee

== See also ==
- Coffey County, Kansas
