= Coffy (disambiguation) =

Coffy is a 1973 American blaxploitation film.

Coffy may also refer to:

- Coffy (person) (died 1763), West African who led a slave revolt in the Dutch colony of Berbice (present-day Guyana)
- Robert-Joseph Coffy (1920–1995), French Roman Catholic cardinal and Archbishop of Marseille
- Lake Coffy, in the canton of Vaud, Switzerland
- Coffy (soundtrack), soundtrack for the film
- Coffee
