= Domhnall Ó Cobhthaigh =

Irish poet (died 1446)

Domhnall Ó Cobhthaigh (died 1446) was an Irish poet.

A brother of Maeleachlainn Ó Cobhthaigh (died 1429) and a son of An Clasach Ó Cobhthaigh (died 1415), Ó Cobhthaigh was a member of a hereditary bardic family. However, he was also famous as a soldier. One of his surviving poems, T'aire riot, a mheic Mhurchaidh – addressed to the Mac Murchadha Caomhánach – urges the men of Leinster to resist the Anglo-Irish.

He was killed, along with his two sons, on the island of Cróinis on Lough Ennell, by Art Ó Mael Sheachlainn and the sons of Fiacha Mag Eochagáin.
