= Ó Cobhthaigh =

Ó Cobhthaigh is a Gaelic-Irish surname, generally Anglicised as Coffey, Cofer, Coffer, Copher, Caughey, Coffee, Coffie, Coughey, Cauffey, Cauffy, Cauffie, Coffy, Coughay, Coffay, Coffeye, Couhig, Cowhig, Cowhey and many more.

== Overview ==
Ó Cobhthaigh was the name of an Irish Brehon family from County Westmeath and County Longford. They were known as the chief ollamhs or filí of Uisneach, where there is a Tuar Uí Cobhthaigh, Toorcoffey (Coffey's Tower).

"There are several families in Ireland who derive their surnames from the hereditary professions of their ancestors, and especially of the bardic order......Thus we find in several passages in the Annals (of the Four Masters) that the O'Coffeys, O'Higgins, and O'Dalys were chief professors of poetry over the schools of Ireland; and many of those assumed the title of chief professors of the men of Ireland and Scotland, in Brehonism, Bardism, Minstrelsy etc" Transaction of the Ossianic Society 1860

The Annals of the Four Masters record the deaths of members of the family in 1415 and 1452. In 1546 Tadhg Ó Cobhthaigh, called ‘chief preceptor of Ireland and Scotland in poetry’, was arrested by the Dublin administration ‘for his attachment to the Irish’, ‘and confined for eighteen weeks in the King's castle’. It was ‘intended that he should be put to death’, but he managed to escape. He died in 1554. Another member of the family, Uaithne, son of Uilliam Ó Cobhthaigh, ‘the most learned in Ireland in poetry’, ‘was treacherously slain at night [along with his wife] . . . but it is not known by whom’.

The poem beginning "Dá néll orchra os iath Uisnigh" (Two clouds of woe over Uisneach's land), which is 150 verses long, deals with the murder of the poet Uaithne Ó Cobhthaigh and his wife in 1556

There were at least three other families of the name, located in the regions of Limerick-Kerry, Down, west Cork, and Galway.

Acclaimed celtic scholar Kuno Meyer named at least five O'Cobhthaighs in his list of irish poets (fílidh) over the past 2000 years. Some scholars point to this being evidence of a heritary brehon or druidic lineage.

== Genealogy ==
Dubhaltach Mac Fhirbhisigh preserved an Ó Cobhthaigh genealogy in Leabhar na nGenealach:

- Genealach Uí Chobthaigh: Tadhg m. Cobthaig m. Balldair m. Niocoil m. Conchabhair m. Maghnusa m. Aeda m. Donnchuidh an Daingin m. Fearguil in Dúin m. Diarmada m. Conchabhair m. Mathghamna m. Conchabhair Cearmna m. Mec-Raith m. Domnuill m. Don[n]chuidh Moir m. Cobhthaigh finn, o ttaid Ui Chobthaigh (from whom are Uí Chobthaigh) m. Dunghalaigh m. Mec-Con m. Connadh Chilline m. Feargusa mc. Ailealla, p670;

A genealogy on pp. 660–61 picks up from Fearghus mac Oilill: Fearghusa m. Ailealla m. Mec-Rithe m. Conaill Claoín m. Gearain m. Duach tracing the family back to Íoth mac Breogán.

According to historian C. Thomas Cairney, the O'Coffeys were chiefly a family of the Corca Laoghdne who in turn came from the Erainn who were the second wave of Celts who settled in Ireland from 500 to 100 BC.

According to John O'Hart, Pedigrees of the Irish Nation, the O'Cobhthaigh are descendents of the Line of Ith or Ithe. This Ith, brother of Bilé, was ancestors of the Ithians. He was uncle of Milesius of Spain (of the Milesian Gaels), and his descendents settled mostly in Munster.

The 'Genealogy of Corca Laidhe' also suggests that the O' Cobhthaigh were descendents of Ith, the first milesian gaels to land in Ireland.

It says this about the genealogy: "Ua Cobhthaigh, i. e. nepos Cobhthachi, now O'Coffey and O'Cowhig. The name Cobhthach denotes Victor or Victorious. The progenitor after whom the surname was called was Cobhthach Finn, son of Dunghalach, the twelfth in descent from Lughaidh Maccon. This family was seated in the barony of Barryroe, where Dun Ui-Chobhthaig still marks their ancient residence."

To the O’Cobhthaighs, of Barryroe, formerly belonged the Castles of Dundeedy, Dunowen, Dunore, Duneen, Dun-Ui-Cobhthaigh, Dunworley, and Dungorley, according to Dr. Charles Smith. (His. Cos. Cork, book 11, chapter 3).

The Ua Cobhthaighs, now O’Coffeys, according to O’Donovan, of what is now the barony of Dane and Barryroe, in the southern, or ocean boundary, of the County Cork, west of Clonakilty Bay, derive their'descent from Lughaidhe Laidhe—the common ancestor of the Corca-Laidhe—through Cobhthach Finn, son of Dunghalach, twelfth in descent from Lughaidh Mac-con (son of the hound, or hero; the old Irish having used a phrase signifying dog, or hound, to denote a hero, or fierce warrior), from which Cobthach the surname O’Cobhthaigh, now O’Coffey, is deduced. Dun-Ui-Cobhthaigh, in Barryroe, yet indicates the ancient residence of the sept. A genealogy of the Ua Cobhthaighs, from the Book of Ballymote, has been published. The old territory of the sept was “ called Tricha Chead Meadhonach, or the middle or central cantred.”

== Notable family members ==
- An Clasach Ó Cobhthaigh, poet, died 1415
- Maeleachlainn Ó Cobhthaigh, poet, died 1429
- Domhnall Ó Cobhthaigh, poet, died 1446
- Aedh Ó Cobhthaigh, poet, died 1452
- Tomás Ó Cobhthaigh, poet, died 1474
- Murchadh Bacagh Ó Cobhthaigh, poet, died 1478
- Tadhg Ó Cobhthaigh, poet, fl. 1554
- Uaithne Ó Cobhthaigh, poet, died 1556
- Diarmait Ó Cobhthaigh, poet, fl. 1584
- Donnchadh Ó Cobhthaigh, poet, fl. 1584
- Muircheartach Ó Cobhthaigh, poet, fl. 1586
- Charles Coffey, playwright and composer, died 1745
- Brian Coffey, poet and publisher, 1905–1995
- Ciarán Ó Cofaigh, director and producer
- Bláthnaid Ní Chofaigh, TV personality
- Aeneas Coffey, inventor and distiller

== See also ==
- Irish clans
