= Ellie-Jean Coffey =

Australian model

Ellie-Jean Coffey (25 November 1994) is an Australian model, softcore actress and professional surfer.

== Early life ==
The eldest of seven, Coffey (originally from the Gold Coast of Queensland) spent her childhood traveling around Australia with her family. Both her parents were keen surfers, and for 10 years they travelled Australia, while being home schooled. During this time she learned to surf and decided to become a professional surfer. The family regularly attended surfing competitions, which Ellie-Jean entered and eventually started doing well at The whole family surf, and her sisters and brother at times have also reached professional status. Coffey at times has competed with her sister for a spot on the elite Women's Surfing Championship Tour.

== Career ==
Coffey won second place at the Junior World Surfing championships held in Panama in 2012. The surfer tried single fin board, traditional style at the Single fin classic in 2015, and "dominated" the competition, despite not having used one previously By 2017, Coffey was ranked 97th in the QS world rankings. She is also a model, Increased attention being drawn to her social media raised her profile, resulting in her getting a number of sponsorship deals from surf-related fashion companies, including Billabong, Von Zipper and SurfStitch She has also published her own softcore images via her own website

Coffey has claimed that the surfing competition environment is misogynistic. She gave up on entering competitions after 2017. She has stated that surf community and competition contains a lot of negativity and even abuse towards women, and the many years she had spent in it had affected her, to the point where she had sought therapy. She still surfs, but only recreationally, and not in competitions.
