= Aedh Ó Cobhthaigh =

Irish poet

Aedh Ó Cobhthaigh (died 1452) was an Irish poet.

Ó Cobhthaigh was a member of a hereditary bardic family based in what is now County Westmeath. He is recorded as dying of the plague at his house of hospitality in Fertullagh.

== See also ==
- An Clasach Ó Cobhthaigh, died 1415.
- Domhnall Ó Cobhthaigh, died 1446.
- Càrn na Marbh
