= Michael Toffel =

Business Professor

Michael W. Toffel is currently the Senator John Heinz Professor of Environmental Management at Harvard Business School. His research focuses on corporate environmental strategy, managing occupational health and safety and working conditions in supply chains, and CEO activism.

== Education ==
- 2005 Ph.D. Business Administration, University of California, Berkeley. Thesis: “Voluntary Environmental Management Initiatives: Smoke Signals or Smoke Screens?”
- 1996 MBA, Yale School of Management, New Haven, CT
- 1996 Masters of Environmental Management, Yale School of Forestry and Environmental Studies, New Haven, CT
- 1990 B.A. Government with honors, Lehigh University, Bethlehem, PA
