= Newbridge Avenue =

Road

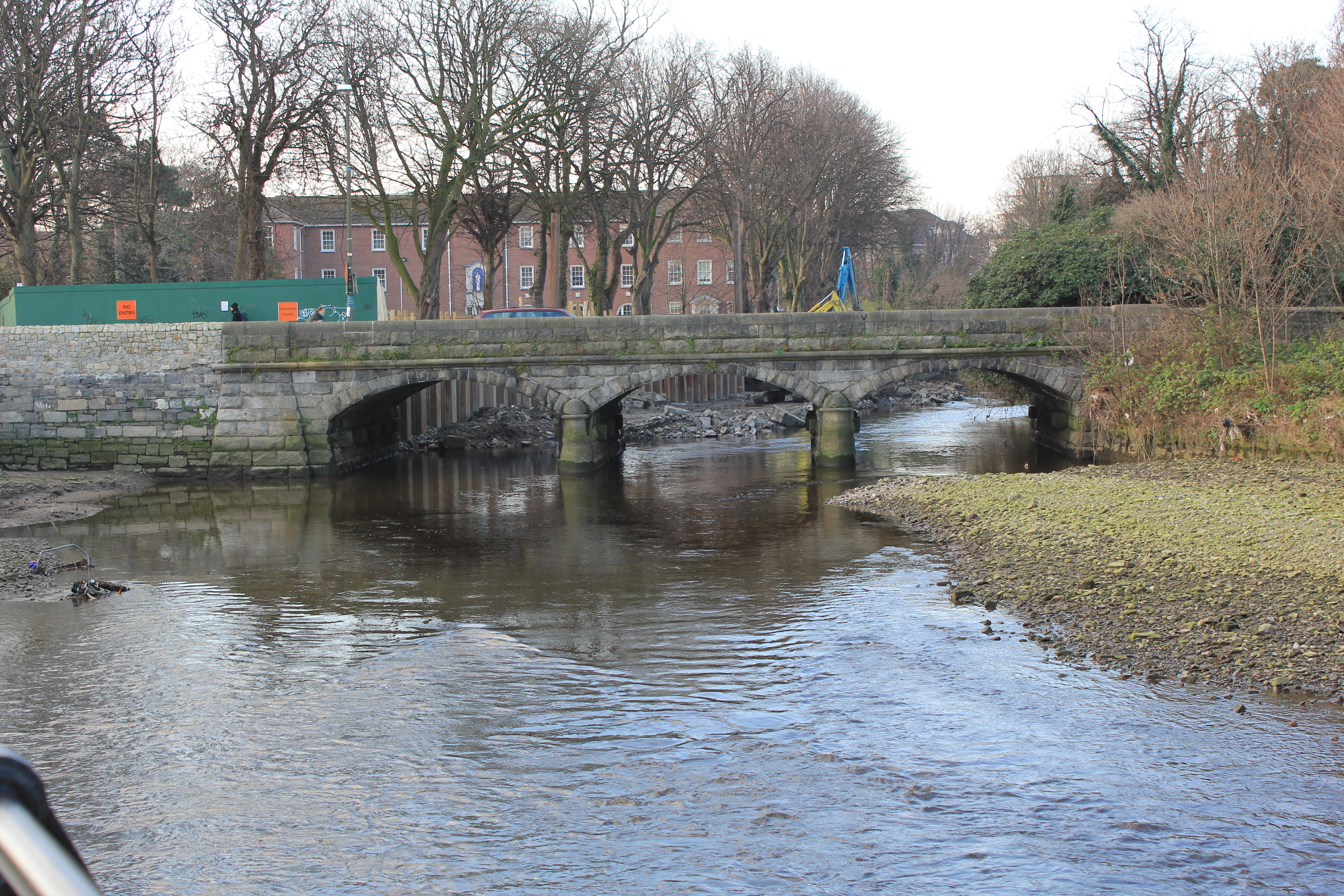
- The New Bridge crossing the Dodder

- Location within Dublin
- Native name: Ascaill an Droichid Nua (Irish)
- Former names: Haig's Lane, New Bridge Avenue
- Namesake: The new stone bridge over the River Dodder
- Length: 290 m (950 ft)
- Width: 15.3 metres (50 ft)
- Location: Sandymount, Dublin, Ireland
- Postal code: D04
- Coordinates: 53.335365°N 6.22368°W
- northeast end: Tritonville Road
- southwest end: Lansdowne Road, Herbert Road

Other
- Known for: Ulysses

Newbridge Avenue (Irish: Ascaill an Droichid Nua) is a road in the Sandymount district of Dublin which links Herbert Road and Tritonville Road.

In the novel Ulysses, the funeral of the character Paddy Dignam starts here at number 9 and continues on to Glasnevin Cemetery via Tritonville Road. The Dignams were said to live at number 9; the property was, in reality, vacant in 1904.

Both this road and Herbert Road were built across land which once belonged to Haigs' distillery and so it used to be called Haig's Lane; the foundations of the Avenue were constructed with stone which originally came from the Dodderbank Distillery. The distillery fields at this location featured in the sensational murder of the Reverend George Wogan in 1826. A new stone bridge replaced the old wooden toll bridge in the mid-19th century, giving the road the name of "New Bridge Avenue." Construction of houses upon this land then took place in the 1860s.

Due to the Irish property bubble of recent times, properties on this road have risen greatly in value and, in 2006, a house was sold for €2M.

== See also ==
- List of streets and squares in Dublin
