= Jack Coffey (footballer) =

Australian rules footballer (1929–2007)

Personal information
- Full name: John Coffey
- Born: 9 March 1929
- Died: 27 February 2007 (aged 77)
- Original team: West St. Kilda

Playing career^{1}
Years	Club	Games (Goals)
1948–1952	St Kilda	59 (50)
1953–1956	Morwell	
1957–1959	St Kilda	30 (2)
- ^{1} Playing statistics correct to the end of 1959.

Jack Coffey (9 March 1929 – 27 February 2007) was an Australian rules football player for St Kilda in the Victorian Football League (VFL) and Morwell in the Latrobe Valley Football League.

== Playing career ==
Coffey made his debut for St Kilda in Round 11 of the 1948 VFL season. Soon becoming a regular for the Saints, he missed only a handful of matches until 1952 when he moved to Morwell to operate a newsagency. St Kilda refused a transfer to Morwell Football Club nine times during 1952 and 1953 before finally approving the request in June 1953.

After several years in the Latrobe Valley Football League, he rejoined St Kilda for the 1957 VFL season. He played until the 1959 season, having played 89 matches for St Kilda.
