= UVW mapping =

UVW mapping is a mathematical technique for coordinate mapping. In computer graphics, it most commonly maps an object's surface in $\mathbb{R}^{2}$ to a solid texture with UVW coordinates in $\mathbb{R}^{3}$, in contrast to UV mapping, which maps surfaces in $\mathbb{R}^{2}$ to an image with UV coordinates in $\mathbb{R}^{2}$. The UVW mapping is suitable for painting an object's surface based on a solid texture. This allows a marble texture to wrap a vase to appear as if it were carved from actual marble. "UVW", like the standard Cartesian coordinate system, has three dimensions; the third dimension allows texture maps to wrap in complex ways onto irregular surfaces. Each point in a UVW map corresponds to a point on the surface of the object. The graphic designer or programmer generates the specific mathematical function to implement the map, so that points on the texture are assigned to (XYZ) points on the target surface. Generally speaking, the more orderly the unwrapped polygons are, the easier it is for the texture artist to paint features onto the texture. Once the texture is finished, all that has to be done is to wrap the UVW map back onto the object, projecting the texture in a way that is far more flexible and advanced, preventing graphic artifacts that accompany more simplistic texture mappings such as planar projection. For this reason, UVW mapping is commonly used to texture map non-platonic solids, non-geometric primitives, and other irregularly shaped objects, such as characters and furniture.
