= Coffee Johnny =

Coffee Johnny a.k.a. Coffy Johnny and John Oliver (c. 1829 – 7 April 1900) was immortalised in the 6th verse George Ridley's song 'The Blaydon Races'. Coffee Johnny was a blacksmith in the village of Winlaton, a trumpeter in the Winlaton Brass Band, a bare-knuckle boxer and Geordie celebrity. He was well known for his tall height and for wearing a white top hat.

== Origins of the name ==
Although George Ridley's original manuscript gives the spelling "Coffy" all later publications spell it in the usual way. Local history archives contain anecdotal evidence that he was nicknamed Coffy because he always used to have a cup before school.

== Family ==
Coffee Johnny was adopted by Thomas and Margery Oliver about 1840.

Coffee Johnny married Elizabeth Greener, and they had nine children: Katherine, Mary, Elizabeth, Margery, Sarah, Margaret, Tom, Joseph and Hannah. He also had a son, Robert, with Anne Hurst after the death of his wife, who was adopted by Coffee Johnny's daughter Sarah and her husband Miles Batey.

Coffee Johnny is buried in St. Paul's churchyard, Winlaton.
