= Coffee (surname) =

Coffee is the surname of:

- Claire Coffee (born 1980), American actress
- Glen Coffee (born 1987), former American football running back
- Glenn Coffee (born 1967), American lawyer and politician from Oklahoma
- Harry B. Coffee (1890–1972), American politician from Nebraska
- Jerome Coffee (born 1958), American former bantamweight boxer
- Jane Purcell Coffee (1944–2023), American mathematician
- John Coffee (disambiguation), multiple people
- Lenore Coffee (1896–1984), American screenwriter, playwright and novelist
- Linda Coffee (born 1942), one of the two attorneys who argued the case of Roe v. Wade before the Supreme Court
- Pat Coffee (born 1915), American former National Football League halfback
- Paul Coffee (born 1956), American retired soccer goalkeeper
- Richard J. Coffee (1925–2017), American politician from New Jersey
- W. J. Coffee (1774–1846), English artist and sculptor
- John Coffee (1772-1833), American planter and state militia brigadier general in Tennessee.

== See also ==
- Coffey (surname)
- Coffie, a surname
