= Justice Coffey =

Justice Coffey may refer to:

- John Louis Coffey (1922–2012), associate justice of the Wisconsin Supreme Court
- Silas Coffey (1839–1904), associate justice of the Supreme Court of Indiana

== See also ==
- Paul Coffey (judge), judge of the High Court of Ireland
