= Coffi Roger Anoumou =

Beninese Roman Catholic bishop

- Bishop of Lokossa
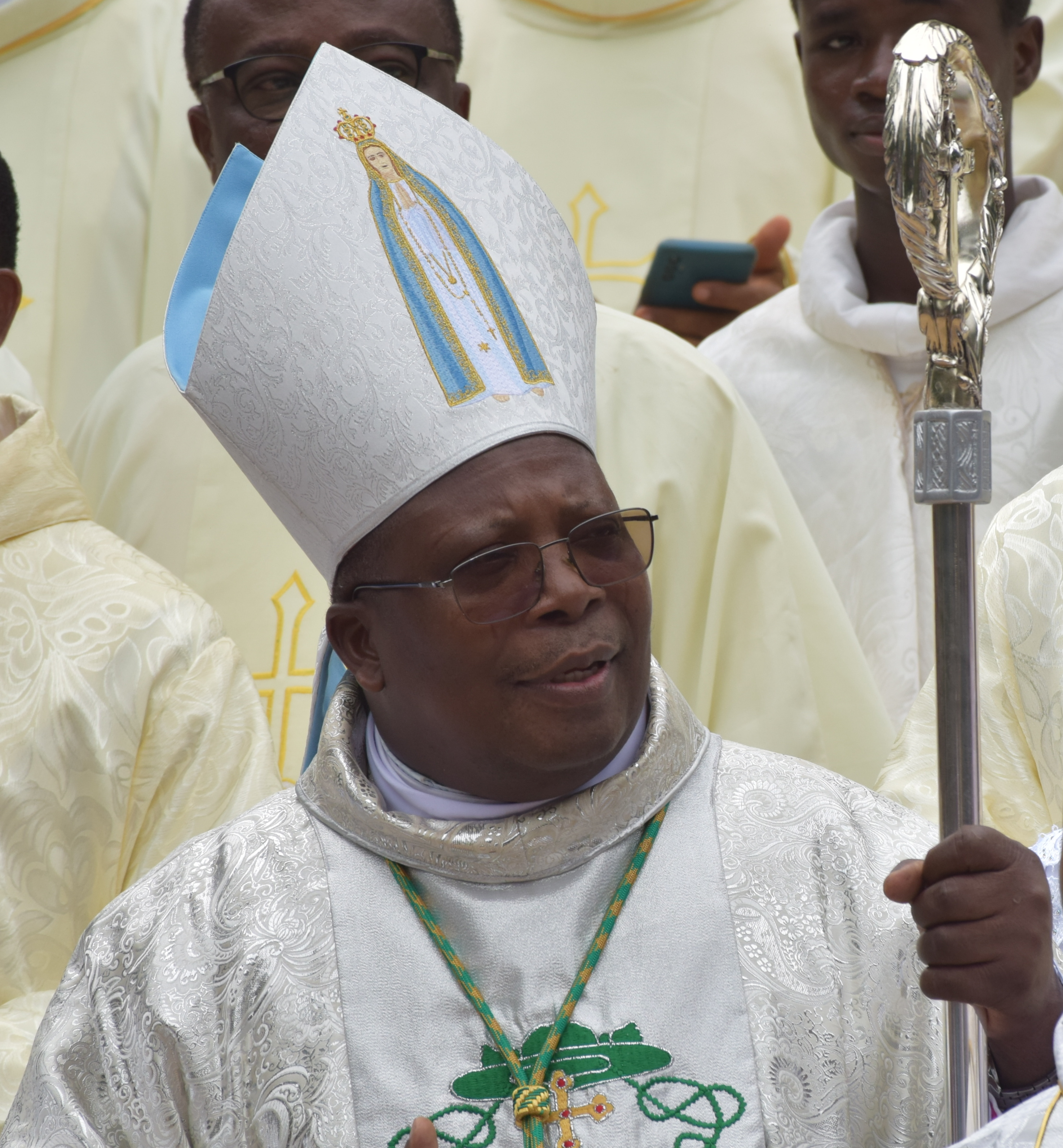
- Church: Catholic Church
- Diocese: Diocese of Lokossa
- Appointed: 4 March 2023
- Predecessor: Victor Agbanou

Orders
- Ordination: 27 December 2003
- Consecration: 13 May 2023 by Mark Miles

Personal details
- Born: 30 July 1972 (age 54) Dogbo-Tota, Mono Province, Republic of Dahomey
- Motto: UT UNUM SINT
- Coat of arms: Coffi Roger Anoumou's coat of arms

Coffi Roger Anoumou (born 30 July 1972 in Dogbo-Tota, Benin) is a Beninese Roman Catholic bishop, serving as the Bishop of Lokossa since 4 March 2023.

== Biography ==
Coffi Roger Anoumou attended the minor seminaries of Djimè near Abomey and Parakou.

After the preparatory course, he studied philosophy and theology at the seminary in Ouidah. On 27 December 2003, he was ordained to the priesthood for the Diocese of Lokossa.

Following his ordination, he served as a teacher at the boys' seminary in Parakou until 2005, where he taught English and philosophy.

From 2006 to 2007, he worked in pastoral ministry in Nima, a district of Accra, Ghana.

From 2007 to 2011, he pursued studies in Rome and earned a degree in educational psychology and development from the Salesian Pontifical University.

After a year as an educator in the boys' seminaries of Parakou and Djimé, he returned to Rome, where he obtained a doctorate in psychopedagogy from 2012 to 2015. During his time in Italy, he also engaged in pastoral work in the Diocese of Cesena-Sarsina until 2017.

Between 2015 and 2020, he conducted study visits to his home country and Rome, during which he pursued further studies in Paris, earning a doctorate in applied psychology. From 2017 to 2021, he also served as a parish priest in his home diocese.

From 2021, he served as the Regent of the Saint-Paul Seminary in Djimè and as the parish priest of the Technical High School in Bohicon.

On 4 March 2023, Pope Francis appointed him as the Bishop of Lokossa.

He was ordained on 13 May 2023 at the Cathedral of Saint Peter Claver in Lokossa, by Mark Gérard Milles, Apostolic Nuncio to Benin and Togo, Victor Agbanou, outgoing Bishop of Lokossa, and Martin Adjou Moumouni, Bishop of N'dali.

In October 2023, he represented Benin at the Synod of Bishops on Synodality in Rome.

His episcopal ministry emphasizes unity, reflected in his episcopal motto: UT UNUM SINT, Latin for THAT THEY MAY BE ONE
