= An Clasach Ó Cobhthaigh =

Irish poet

- Died: 1415
- Citizenship: Irish
- Occupation: Poet
- Children: Maeleachlainn Ó Cobhthaigh, Domhnall Ó Cobhthaigh
- Writing career
- Language: Gaelic

An Clasach Ó Cobhthaigh (died 1415) was an Irish poet.

A member of the Ó Cobhthaigh bardic family, An Clasach is noted in the Oxford Dictionary of National Biography as "a famous poet and man of learning." He had sons Maeleachlainn Ó Cobhthaigh (died 1429) and Domhnall Ó Cobhthaigh (died 1446), who were also poets.

The O' Cobhthaigh ( Coffey) were known as the heritary brehon (druidic) family of Uisneach
