= Justin Georges Ebengue =

Cameroonian Catholic prelate (born 1970)

The Most Reverend Justin Georges Ebengue
- Bishop of Yokadouma, Cameroon
- Church: Catholic Church
- Archdiocese: Roman Catholic Archdiocese of Bertoua
- See: Diocese of Yokadouma
- Appointed: 11 January 2025
- Installed: 1 March 2025
- Predecessor: Paul Lontsié-Keuné (25 April 2017 - 27 November 2021)
- Successor: Incumbent

Orders
- Ordination: 18 February 2006
- Consecration: 1 March 2025 by Samuel Kleda
- Rank: Bishop

Personal details
- Born: Justin Georges Ebengue; 18 May 1970 (age 55) Mpong par Evodoula, Archdiocese of Yaoundé, Cameroon

Styles of Justin Georges Ebengue
- Reference style: Your Lordship; The Most Reverend
- Spoken style: His Lordship
- Religious style: Bishop

Justin Georges Ebengue (born 18 May 1970) is a Cameroonian Catholic prelate who was appointed Bishop of the Roman Catholic Diocese of Yokadouma, in Cameroon on 11 January 2025. Before that, from 18 February 2006 until 11 January 2025, he was a priest. He was appointed bishop of Yokadouma, by Pope Francis. He was consecrated and installed at Yokadouma, Diocese of Yokadouma on 1 March 2025 by Samuel Kleda, Archbishop of Douala.

== Background and education ==
Justin Georges Ebengue was born on 18 May 1970 in Mpong par Evodoula, in the Archdiocese of Yaoundé, in Cameroon. He attended the Saint Jean-Baptiste Preparatory Seminary of Doumé, in Doumé, Cameroon. He studied philosophy and theology at the Notre Dame de l’Espérance Interdiocesan Major Seminary of Bertoua, in Bertoua, Cameroon. Later, he graduated with a licentiate in canon law from the Catholic University of Central Africa, in Yaoundé.

== Priesthood ==
He was ordained a priest for the Diocese of Batouri on 18 February 2006. He served as a priest until 11 January 2025. While a priest, he served in various roles and locations, including as:

- Parish vicar, parish priest and rector of the Minor Seminary of Doumé in Doumé.
- Chancellor of the Diocese of Doumé-Abong' Mbang.
- Head of diocesan pastoral care and catechesis.
- Diocesan administrator of Batouri Diocese from 2017 until 2018.
- Rector of the Cathedral of Batouri.
- Chaplain of the Bary Catholic College.
- Member of the College of Consultors, the Presbyteral Council and the Council for Economic Affairs for Batouri Diocese.
- Member of the administration of the diocesan Procuratorate for Batouri Diocese.
- Vicar General of the Diocese of Batouri.
- Rector of the Notre-Dame de l'Espérance Interdiocesan Major Seminary of Bertoua from 2023 until 2025.

== As bishop ==
On 11 January 2025, Pope Francis appointed him as bishop of the Roman Catholic Diocese of Yokadouma, Cameroon, a suffragan of the Ecclesiastical Metropolitan Province of Bertoua. He succeeded Bishop Paul Lontsié-Keuné, who was appointed Bishop of the Diocese of Bafoussam on 27 November 2021.

Bishop Justin Georges Ebengue was consecrated bishop and installed at Yokadouma, Cameroon on 1 March 2025. The Principal Consecrator was Samuel Kleda, Archbishop of Douala assisted by Paul Lontsié-Keuné, Bishop of Bafoussam and Marcellin-Marie Ndabnyemb, Bishop of Batouri.

== See also ==
- Catholic Church in Cameroon

== Succession table ==
Catholic Church titles
Preceded by Paul Lontsié-Keuné (25 April 2017 - 27 November 2021)	Bishop of Yokadouma (since 11 January 2025)	Succeeded by Incumbent
