= Marcellin-Marie Ndabnyemb =

Cameroonian Catholic prelate (born 1965)

The Most Reverend Marcellin-Marie Ndabnyemb
- Bishop of Batouri, Cameroon
- Church: Catholic Church
- Archdiocese: Roman Catholic Archdiocese of Bertoua
- See: Diocese of Batouri
- Appointed: 25 April 2018
- Installed: 7 July 2018
- Predecessor: Faustin Ambassa Ndjodo (3 December 2009 - 22 October 2016)
- Successor: Incumbent

Orders
- Ordination: 13 April 1996
- Consecration: 7 July 2018 by Samuel Kleda
- Rank: Bishop

Personal details
- Born: Marcellin-Marie Ndabnyemb; 2 June 1965 (age 61) Logbikoy, Diocese of Douala, Littoral Region, Cameroon

Styles of Marcellin-Marie Ndabnyemb
- Reference style: Your Lordship; The Most Reverend
- Spoken style: His Lordship
- Religious style: Bishop

Marcellin-Marie Ndabnyemb (born 2 June 1965) is a Cameroonian Catholic prelate who serves as the bishop of the Roman Catholic Diocese of Batouri, in Cameroon since 25 April 2018. Before that, from 13 Apri 1996 until 25 April 2018, he served as a priest of the Roman Catholic Archdiocese of Douala, Cameroon. He was appointed bishop by Pope Francis. He was consecrated and installed at Batouri on 7 July 2018. The Principal Concecrator was Samuel Kleda, Archbishop of Douala.

== Background and education ==
He was born on 2 June 1965 in Logbikoy, in what is today, the Diocese of Edéa, in the Littoral Region of Cameroon. He studied philosophy and theology at the Paul VI Interdiocesan Major Seminary in Douala. Later, he earned a Licentiate in Spiritual Theology from the Pontifical Theological Faculty Teresianum (Teresianum), in Rome, Italy.

== Priest ==
On 13 April 1996, he was ordained a priest for the Archdiocese of Douala. He served as a priest until 25 April 2018. While a priest, he served in various roles and locations, includung:

- Teacher at the Saint Paul di Nylon Minor Seminary in Douala from 1996 until 2001.
- Studies at the Teresianum, in Rome, Italy, leading to the award of a licentiate in Spiritual Theology from 2001 until 2003.
- Professor and Spiritual Father at the Paul VI Interdiocesan Major Seminary in Douala from 2003 until 2014.
- Director of Notre Dame des Nations College in Douala, Cameroon from 2014 until 2018.

== Bishop ==
On 25 April 2018, Pope Francis appointed him bishop of the Roman Catholic Diocese of Batouri, a suffragan of the Ecclasiastical Metropolitan Province of Bertoua, Cameroon. He was consecrated and installed at Batouri on 7 July 2018 by Samuel Kleda, Archbishop of Douala, assisted by Joseph Atanga, Archbishop of Bertoua and Faustin Ambassa Ndjodo, Archbishop of Garoua.

== See also ==
- Catholic Church in Cameroon

== Succession table ==
Catholic Church titles
Preceded by Faustin Ambassa Ndjodo (3 December 2009 - 22 October 2016)	Bishop of Batouri (since 25 April 2018)	Succeeded by (Incumbent)
