= Roger Pirenne =

Belgian Roman Catholic prelate (1934–2023)

His Excellency Roger Pirenne
- Archbishop Emeritus of Bertoua
- Appointed: 3 June 1999
- Term ended: 3 December 2009
- Predecessor: Lambertus Johannes van Heygen
- Successor: Joseph Atanga
- Other post: Bishop of Batouri (1994–1999)

Orders
- Ordination: 3 August 1958
- Consecration: 22 May 1994 by Santos Abril y Castelló

Personal details
- Born: 9 August 1934 Clermont-sur-Berwinne, Belgium
- Died: 6 August 2023 (aged 88) Yaoundé, Cameroon
- Education: Collège royal Marie-Thérèse de Herve
- Alma mater: Scheutveld College

Roger Pirenne (9 August 1934 – 6 August 2023) was a Belgian Roman Catholic prelate. A member of the CICM Missionaries, he was Archbishop Emeritus of Bertoua.

== Biography ==
Born in Clermont-sur-Berwinne on 9 August 1934, Pirenne studied Greek and Latin at the Collège royal Marie-Thérèse de Herve and completed his studies in 1951. He then taught at the Abbé Jean Mairy. His ecclesiastical studies were held at Scheutveld College, and he was then ordained a priest on 3 August 1958.

In 1962, Pirenne was sent on a mission to Congo-Léopoldville. He was then sent to Cameroon and became a vicar in the Diocese of Yaoundé. In 1981, he was moved to Doumaintang, then to Batouri in 1983, and Yokadouma in 1991. In 1994, he was ordained Bishop of Batouri before being named Archbishop of Bertoua in 1999. He became Archbishop Emeritus in 2009.

Roger Pirenne died in Yaoundé on 6 August 2023, at the age of 88.

Catholic Church titles
Preceded by Lambertus Johannes van Heygen	Archbishop of Bertoua; 1999–2009	Succeeded by Joseph Atanga
Preceded by First bishop	Bishop of Batouri; 1994–1999	Succeeded by Samuel Kleda
