= Diocese of Batouri =

Roman Catholic diocese in Cameroon

Coordinates: 4.4358°N 14.3649°E

Diocese of Batouri Dioecesis Baturiensis Diocèse de Batouri
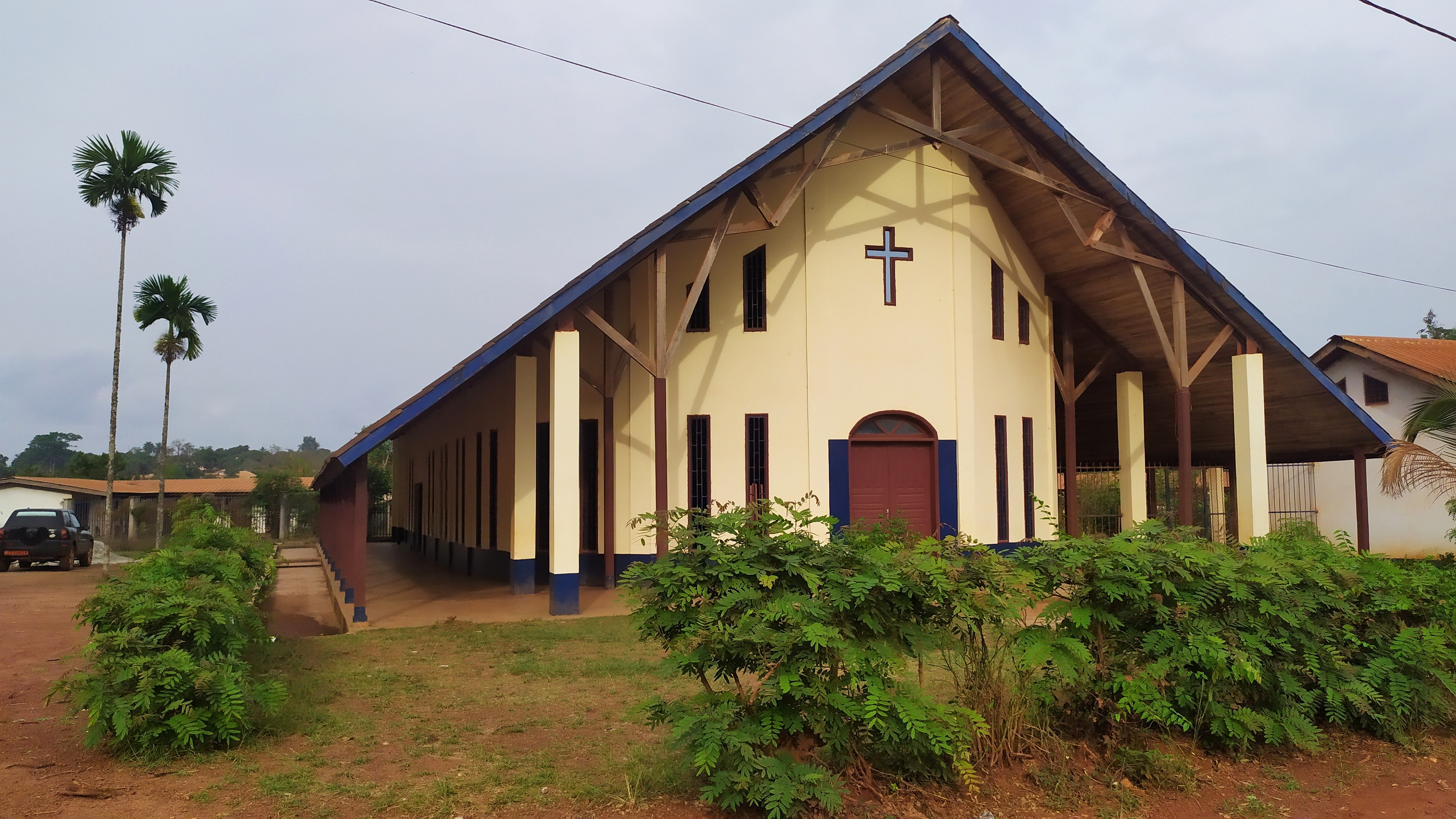
- Saint Martin Catholic Church of Batouri

Location
- Country: Cameroon
- Metropolitan: Archdiocese of Bertoua
- Headquarters: Batouri, East Region, Cameroon

Statistics
- Area: 15,951 km^{2} (6,159 sq mi)
- Population: Total; Catholics: (as of 2023); 220,000; 50,400 (22.9%)
- Parishes: 18

Information
- Denomination: Catholic Church
- Sui iuris church: Latin Church
- Rite: Roman Rite
- Established: 3 February 1994; 32 years ago
- Cathedral: Cathédrale Notre-Dame in Batouri
- Secular priests: 41 (35 Diocesan, 6 Religious Orders)

Current leadership
- Pope: Leo XIV
- Bishop: Marcellin-Marie Ndabnyemb
- Metropolitan Archbishop: Joseph Atanga, S.J.

The Roman Catholic Diocese of Batouri (Latin: Baturien(sis)) is a diocese located in the city of Batouri in the ecclesiastical province of Bertoua in Cameroon. Its seat is the Cathédrale Notre-Dame in Batouri.It has an area of 15,951 square kilometers, with 220,000 inhabitants (50,400 Catholics), 18 parishes, 41 priests (35 diocesan, 6 religious), 17 religious brothers, and 45 religious sisters.

== History ==
- 3 February 1994: Established as Diocese of Batouri from the Diocese of Bertoua

== Leadership ==
Bishops of Batouri (Roman rite)

- Roger Pirenne, C.I.C.M. (3 February 1994 – 3 June 1999), appointed Archbishop of Bertoua
- Samuel Kleda (23 October 2000 – 3 November 2007), appointed Coadjutor Archbishop of Douala
- Faustin Ambassa Ndjodo, C.I.C.M. (3 December 2009 – 22 October 2016), appointed Archbishop of Garoua
  - Apostolic Administrator Faustin Ambassa Ndjodo, C.I.C.M. (22 October 2016 – 7 July 2018), Archbishop of Garoua
- Marcellin-Marie Ndabnyemb (25 April 2018 – Present)

Other priests of this Diocese who became Bishop

- Justin Georges Ebengue (2006-2025), appointed Bishop of Yokadouma in 2025

== See also ==
- Roman Catholicism in Cameroon
