= Eugeniusz Juretzko =

Polish Roman Catholic bishop (1939–2018)

Eugeniusz Juretzko O.M.I.
- Bishop of Yokadouma
- Church: Catholic Church
- Diocese: Diocese of Yokadouma
- In office: 20 May 1991 – 25 April 2017
- Predecessor: Diocese erected
- Successor: Paul Lontsié-Keuné

Orders
- Ordination: 17 May 1964 by Antoni Baraniak
- Consecration: 8 September 1991 by Jean Zoa

Personal details
- Born: 25 December 1939 Radzionkau, Gau Silesia, Nazi Germany
- Died: 16 January 2018 (aged 78) Lubliniec, Silesian Voivodeship, Poland

Eugeniusz Juretzko (25 December 1939 – 16 January 2018) was a Roman Catholic bishop.

Juretzko was born in Poland and was ordained to the priesthood in 1964. He served as bishop of the Roman Catholic Diocese of Yokadouma, Cameroon, from 1991 until 2017.
