= Paul Lontsié-Keuné =

Cameroonian Roman Catholic prelate (born 1963)

The Most Reverend Paul Lontsié-Keuné
- Bishop of Bafoussam, Cameroon
- Church: Catholic Church
- Archdiocese: Roman Catholic Archdiocese of Douala
- See: Bafoussam
- Appointed: 27 November 2021
- Installed: 12 February 2022
- Predecessor: Dieudonné Watio
- Successor: Incumbent
- Other posts: Bishop of Yokadouma, Cameroon (25 April 2017 - 27 November 2021); Apostolic Administrator of Yokadouma, Cameroon (27 November 2021 - 1 March 2025)

Orders
- Ordination: 17 March 1991
- Consecration: 5 July 2017 by Piero Pioppo
- Rank: Bishop

Personal details
- Born: Paul Lontsié-Keuné; 25 August 1963 (age 62) Balatchi, Diocese of Bafoussam, Cameroon

Styles of Paul Lontsié-Keuné
- Reference style: Your Lordship; The Most Reverend
- Spoken style: His Lordship
- Religious style: Bishop

Paul Lontsié-Keuné, (born 25 August 1963), is a Cameroonian Roman Catholic prelate who is the Bishop of the Roman Catholic Diocese of Bafoussam, Cameroon since 2021. Before that, from 2017 until 2021 he was the Bishop of the Roman Catholic Diocese of Yokadouma, Cameroon. He contemporaneously served as Apostolic Administrator of Yokadouma, Cameroon from 27 November 2021 until 1 March 2025. He was appointed bishop by Pope Francis on 25 April 2017. He was consecrated and installed bishop at Yokadouma on 5 July 2017.

== Background and education ==
He was born on 25 August 1963, at Balatchi, Diocese of Bafoussam, in Cameroon. He studied philosophy and theology before he was ordained a priest in March 1991. He studied at the Institut Catholique de Paris in 1998, graduating with an advanced degree in Sacramentary Liturgy.

== Priest ==
On 17 March 1991 he was ordained a priest of Bafoussam, Cameroon. He served in that capacity until 25 April 2017.

As a priest, he served in various roles in different locations including as:

- Assistant Parish Priest at Bangangté Parish from 1998 until 2008.
- Principal of St. John the Baptist College from 1998 until 2008.
- Diocesan Secretary for Catholic Education from 1998 until 2008.
- Diocesan master of ceremonies from 1998 until 2008.
- Rector of St. Augustin Inter-diocesan Seminary in Maroua-Mokolo Diocese, Cameroon since 2008.

== As bishop ==
Following the resignation of Bishop Eugeniusz Juretzko as the Local Ordinary of the Roman Catholic Diocese of Yokadouma, Cameroon, Pope Francis appointed Reverend Father Paul Lontsié-Keuné as the new bishop there on 25 April 2017.

He was consecrated and installed at the Yokadouma Municipal Stadium, in Yokadouma, Cameroon on 5 July 2017 by the hands of Archbishop Piero Pioppo, Titular Archbishop of Torcello assisted by Bishop Dieudonné Watio, Bishop of Bafoussam and Bishop Eugeniusz Juretzko, Bishop Emeritus of Yokadouma.

When Bishop Dieudonné Watio reached the retirement age of 75, Pope Francis accepted his retirement on 19 March 2021. On 27 November 2021. The Holy Father appointed Bishop Paul Lontsié-Keuné to succeed at Bafoussam, Cameroon. He was installed there on 12 February 2022. He was concurrently appointed Apostolic Administrator of Yokadouma, Cameroon from 27 November 2021. That administratorship ceased on 1 March 2025.

== See also ==
- Catholic Church in Cameroon

== Succession table ==
Catholic Church titles
Preceded by Eugeniusz Juretzko (20 May 1991 - 25 April 2017)	Bishop of Yokadouma (25 April 2017 - 27 November 2021)	Succeeded by Justin Georges Ebengue (since 11 January 2025)
Preceded by Dieudonné Watio (5 March 2011 - 19 March 2021)	Bishop of Bafoussam (since 27 Nov 2021)	Succeeded by Incumbent
