= Mosan Renaissance architecture =

Architectural style of 17th-18th centuries in Prince-Bishopric of Liège

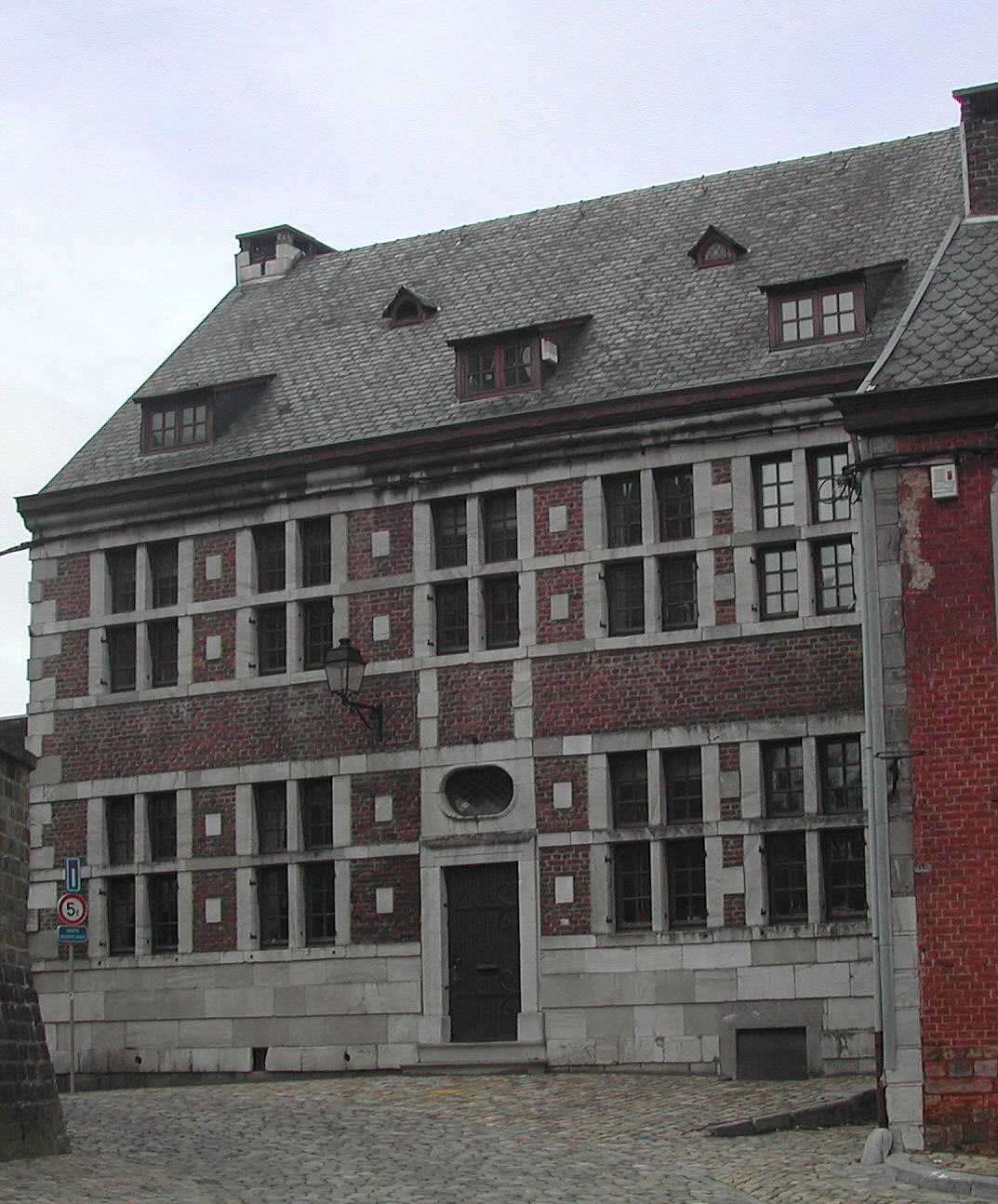
Clermont-sur-Berwinne

Mosan Renaissance also known, at least in French, as the Mosan style, is a regional architectural style dating from the 16th to 18th centuries. The style is related to Renaissance architecture, but with very limited classical influence; it has been described as "voluntarily anachronistic". The term should not be confused with Mosan art, which applies to Romanesque art and architecture during the Middle Ages in the region of the Meuse river valley.

The Mosan style developed in the Prince-Bishopric of Liège in the 16th century during the reign of Prince-bishop Érard de La Marck (r. 1506-1538). The style is an adaptation of earlier vernacular methods of timber framing, but using stone instead of wood. Stone-framed rectangular windows, round-arched doorways and sometimes decorated architraves, all on walls of brick, are characteristic of the style. Stone window frames, mullions and courses, contrasting in colour with the red brick background, create strong patterns on the exteriors. Plain stone squares may be added to fill out the pattern; in some buildings like the merchant's mansion that is now the Curtius Museum these carry reliefs of a single animal or head. Where there are columns, mostly in arcades, the capitals are usually very simple. In grander buildings, the interiors may included vaulted halls, and the exteriors "square pavilions topped with ornate roof spires, cross windows and cornices". In general the decoration on exterior walls projects very little, but on roofs there may be projecting ornament in various forms.

The style was mostly used in the Prince-Bishopric of Liège, a principality whose area is in present-day Belgium and the Netherlands, mainly in the city of Liège, the Land of Herve, and the provinces of Belgian Limburg and Dutch South Limburg. Most materials used were local, especially a bluish limestone (also known as Namur stone), brick and mergel (a type of chalk). The style is used for townhouses, castles, farms, manor houses, and sometimes in monasteries.

The style had a historicist revival in the late 19th and early 20th centuries, known in French as architecture néo-mosane.

== Gallery ==
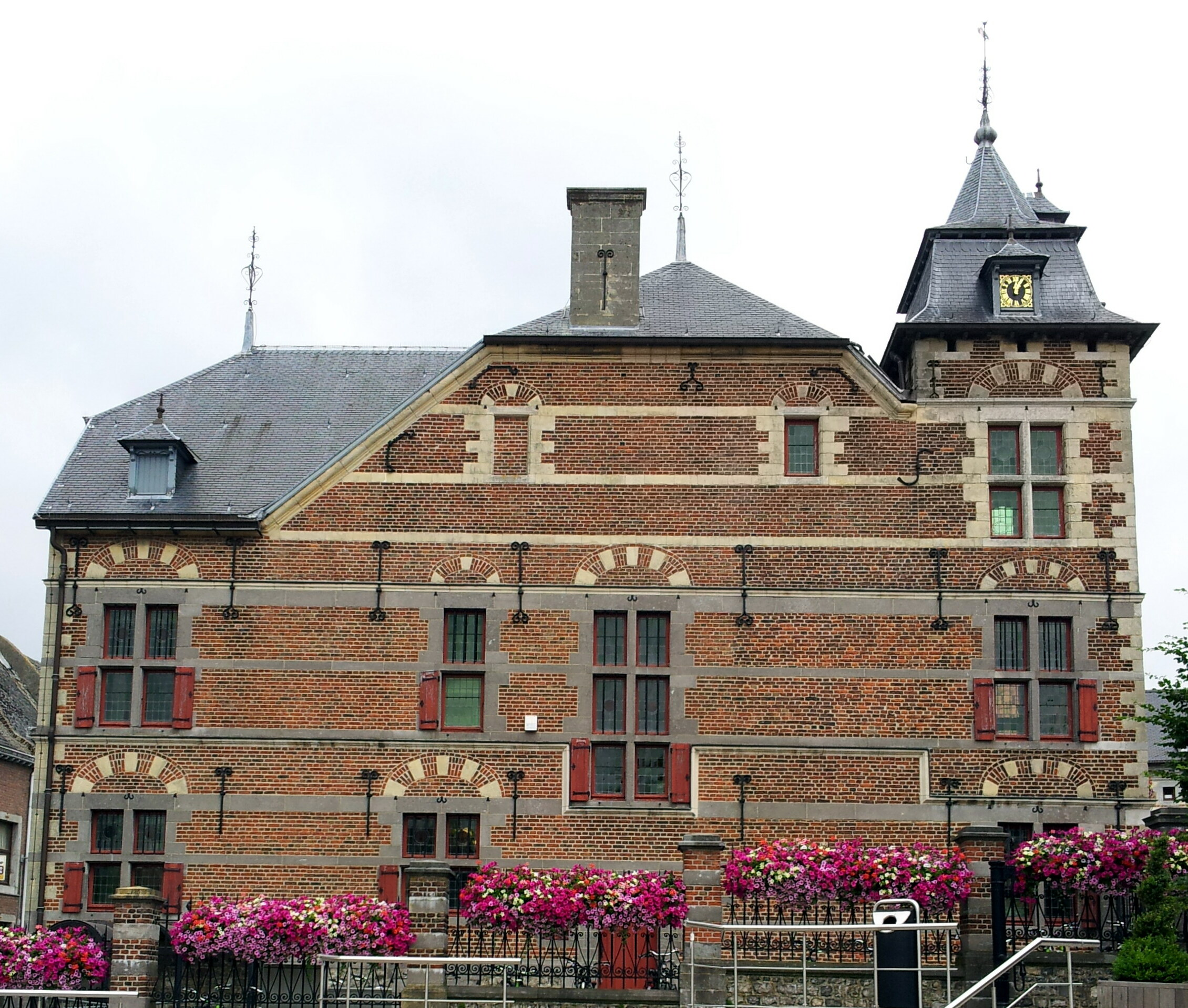
Side of the town hall of Borgloon

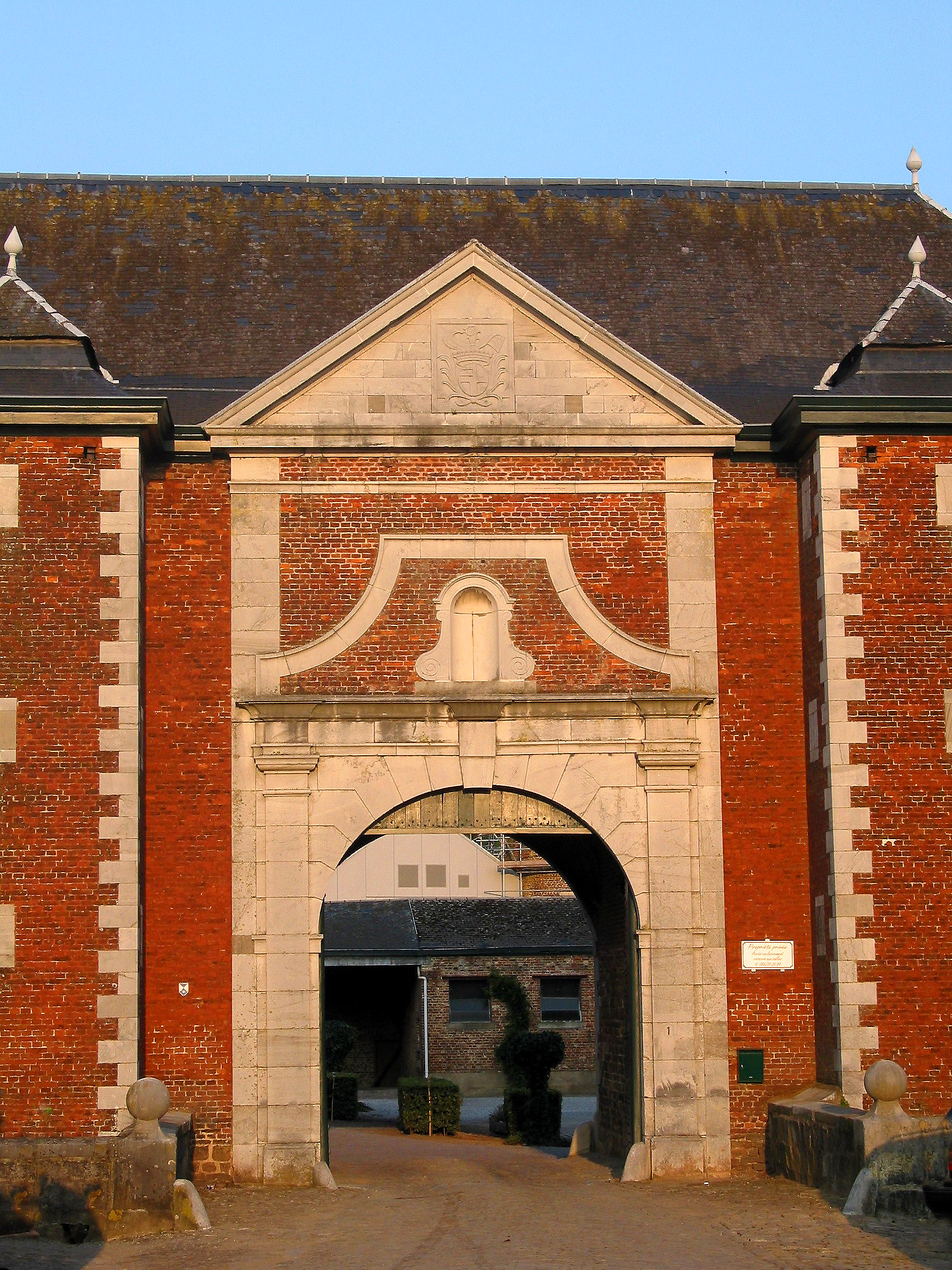
Abbaye de la Paix-Dieu, Amay

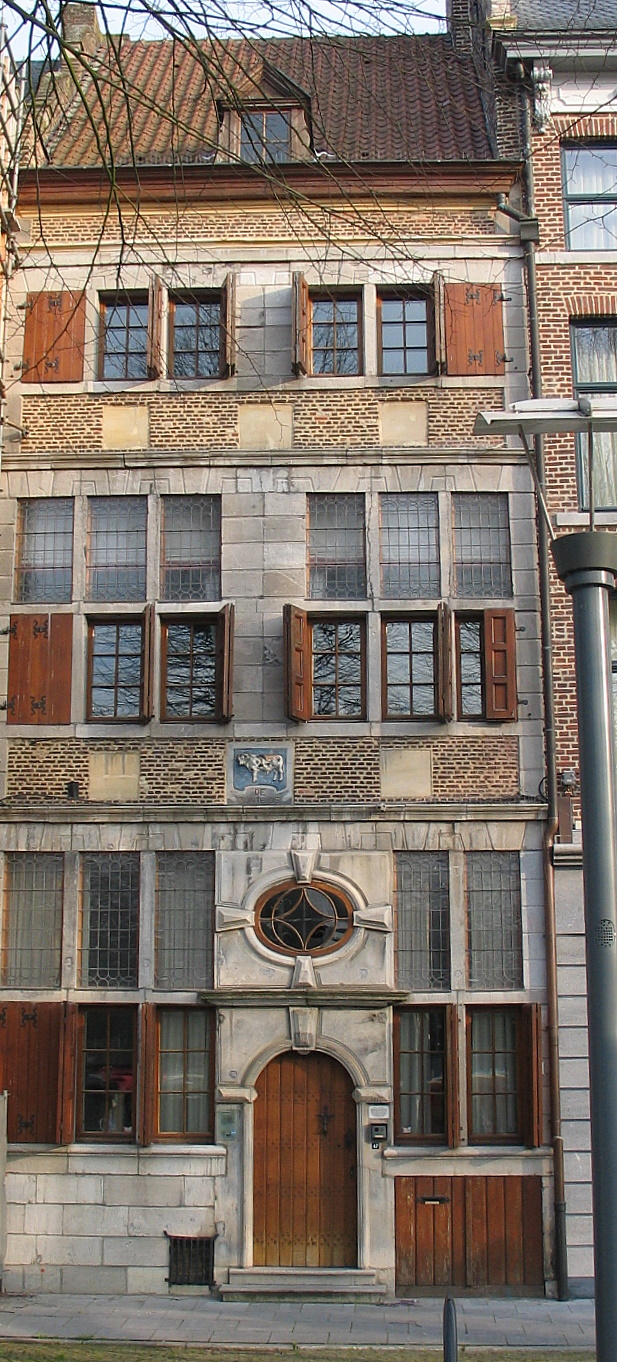
De Bonte Os, Maaseik

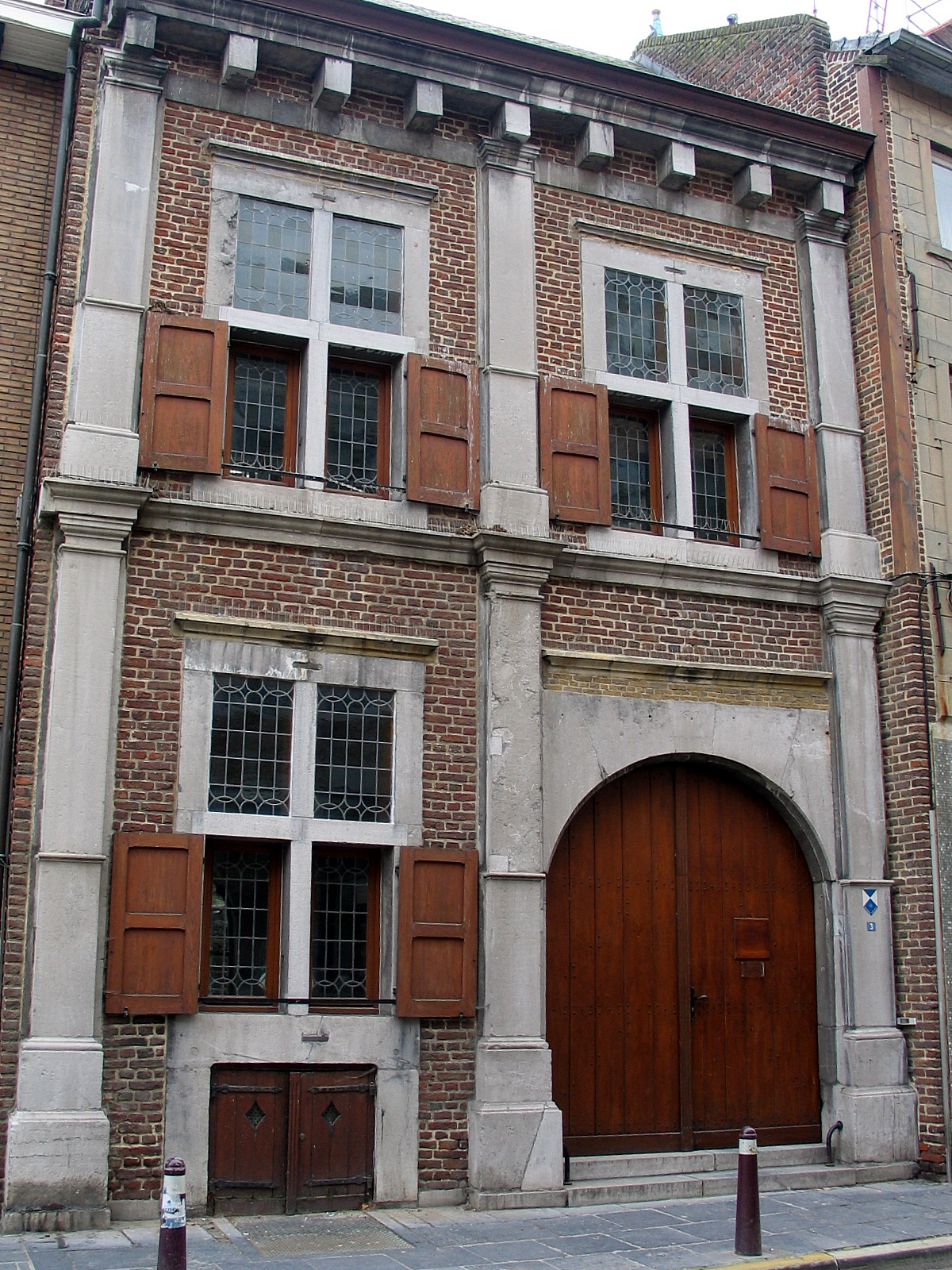
Groene Schildt, Maaseik

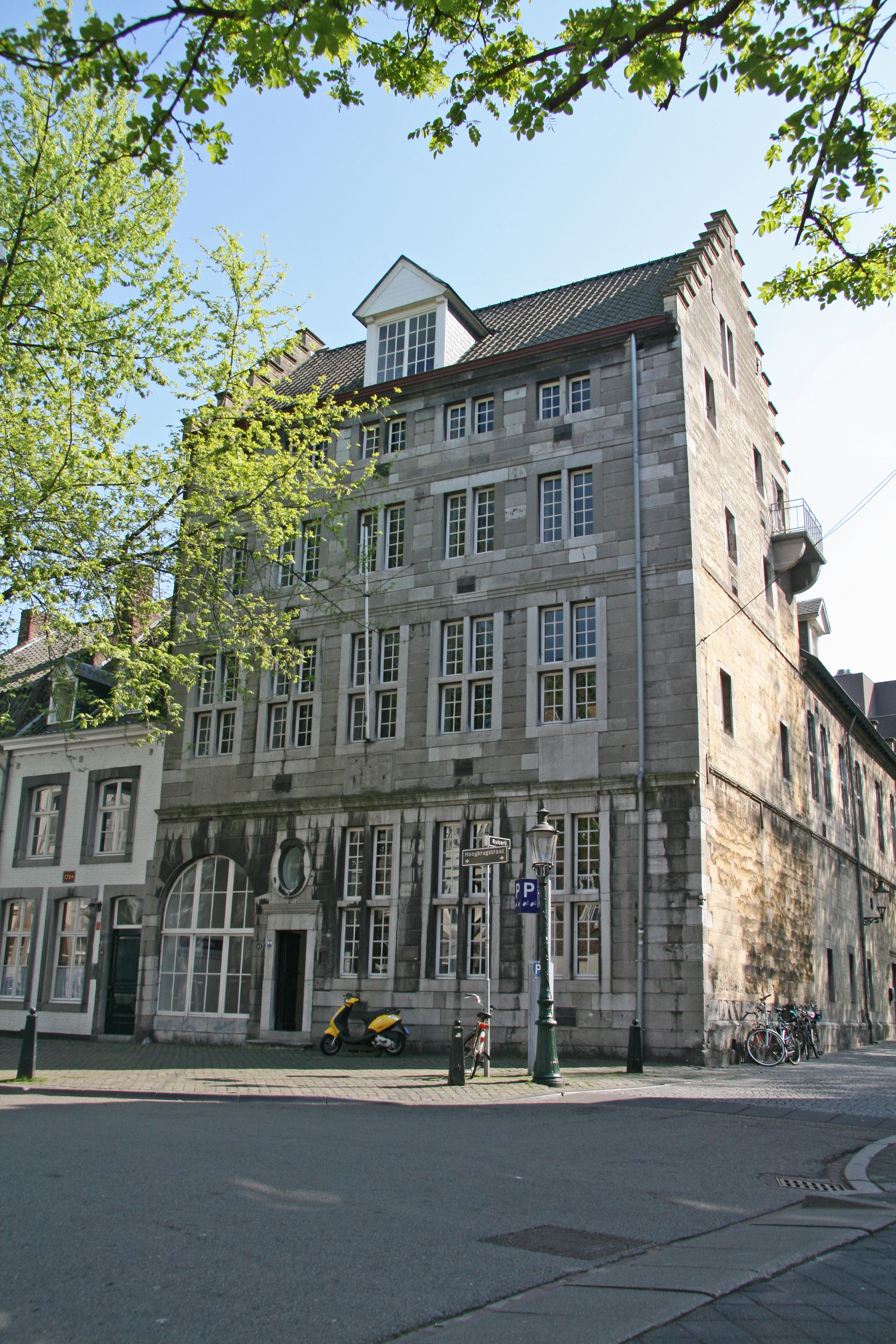
Poort van Beusdael, Maastricht

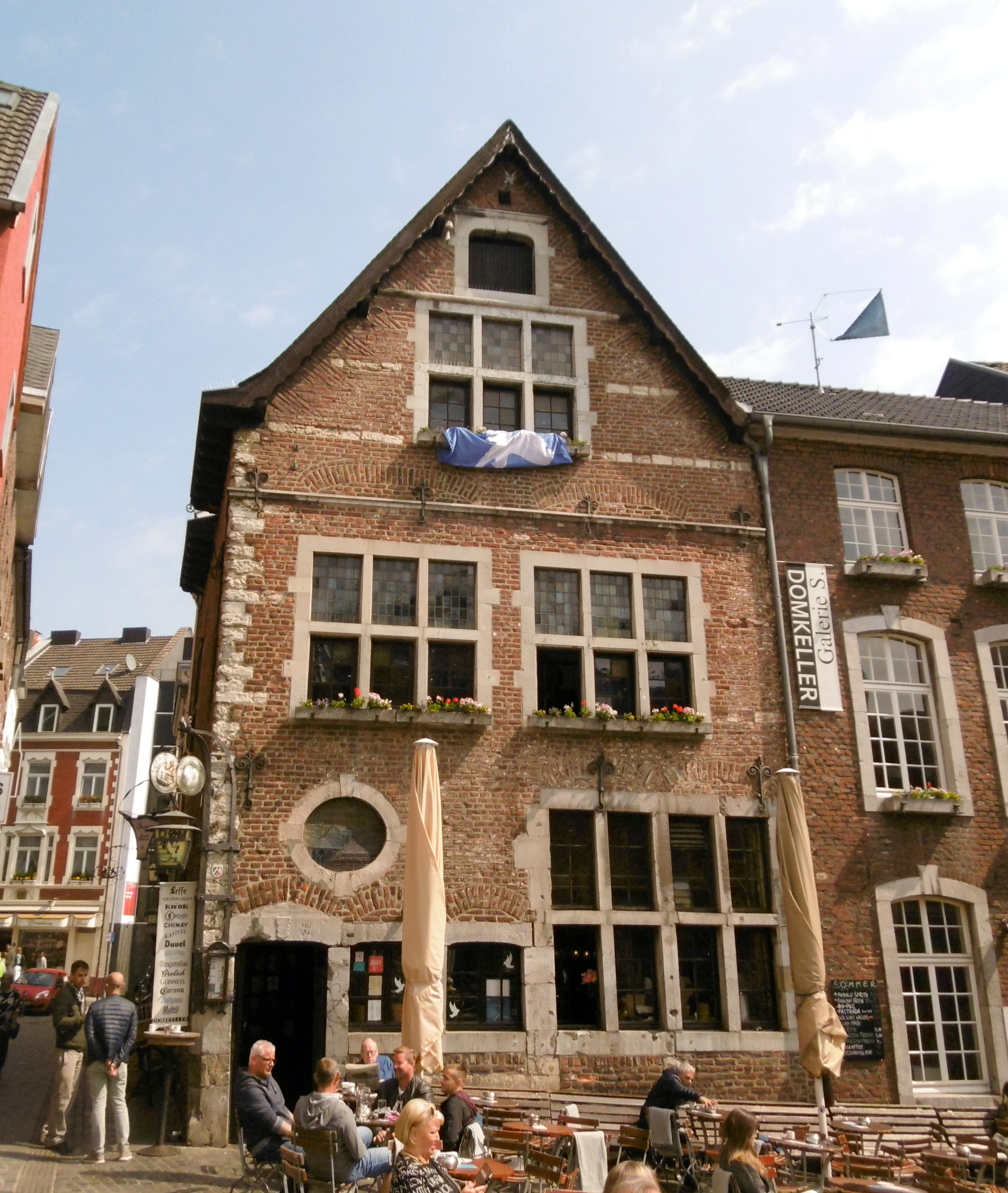
Domkeller, Aachen

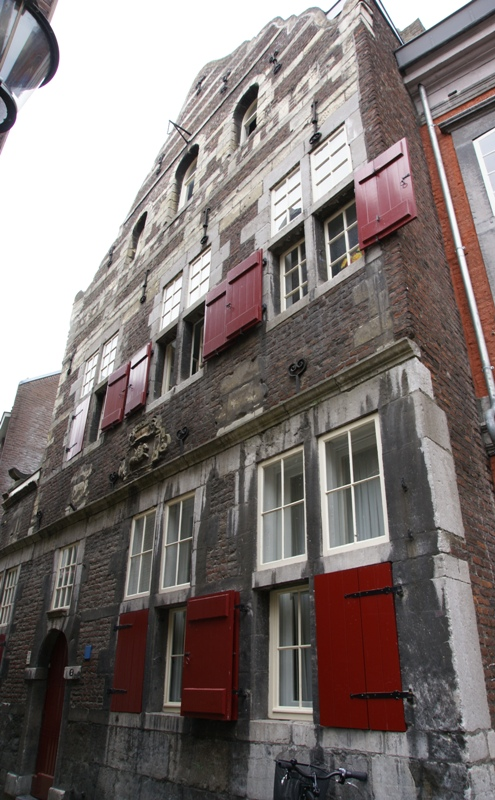
House Ridderstraat, Maastricht

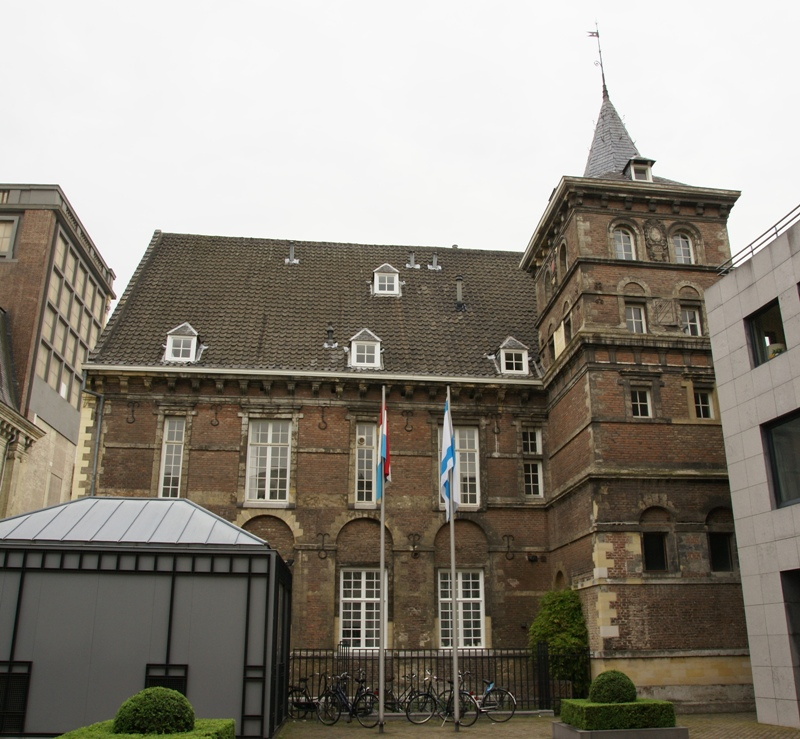
Jesuit college, Maastricht

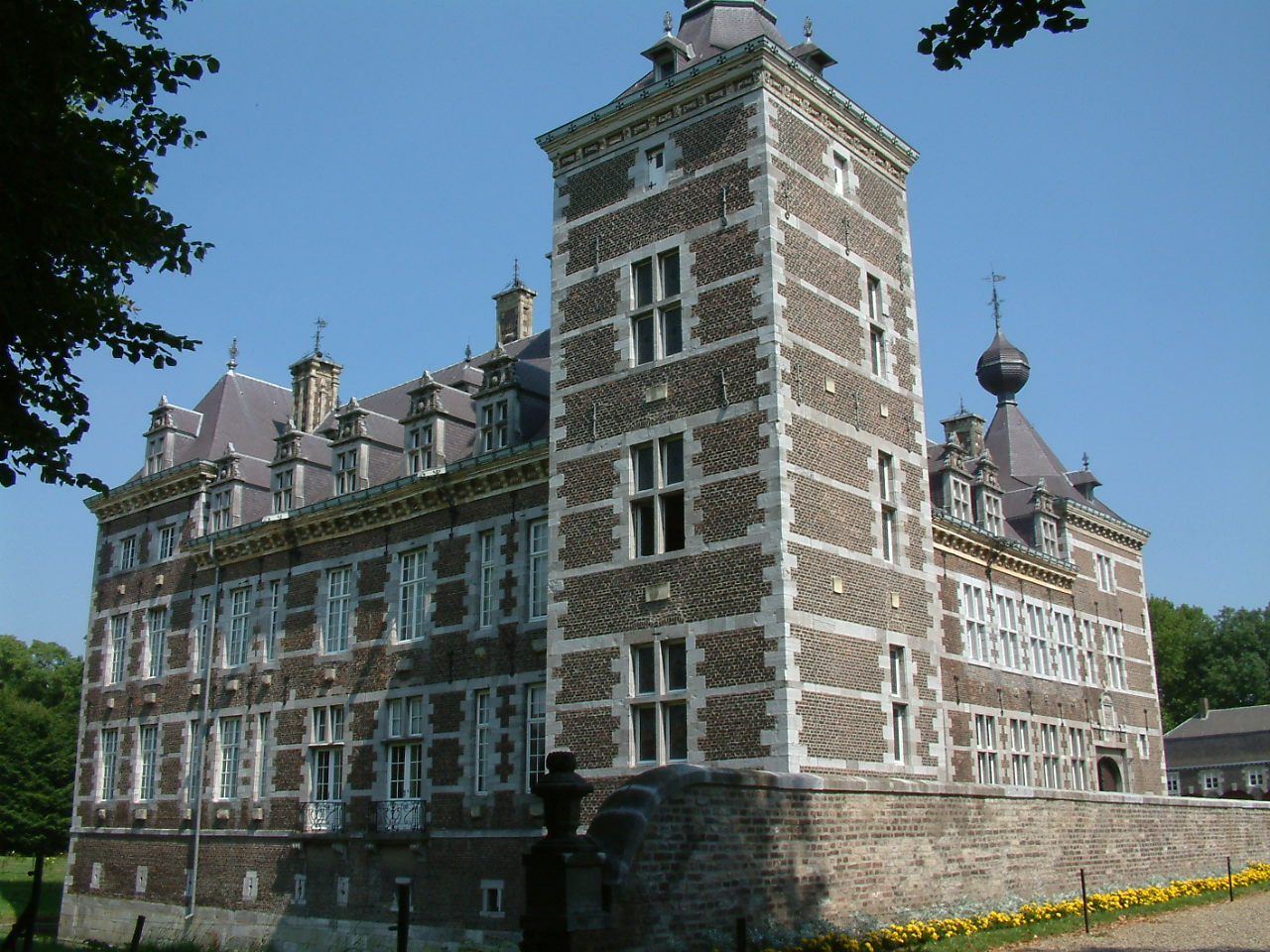
Eijsden Castle

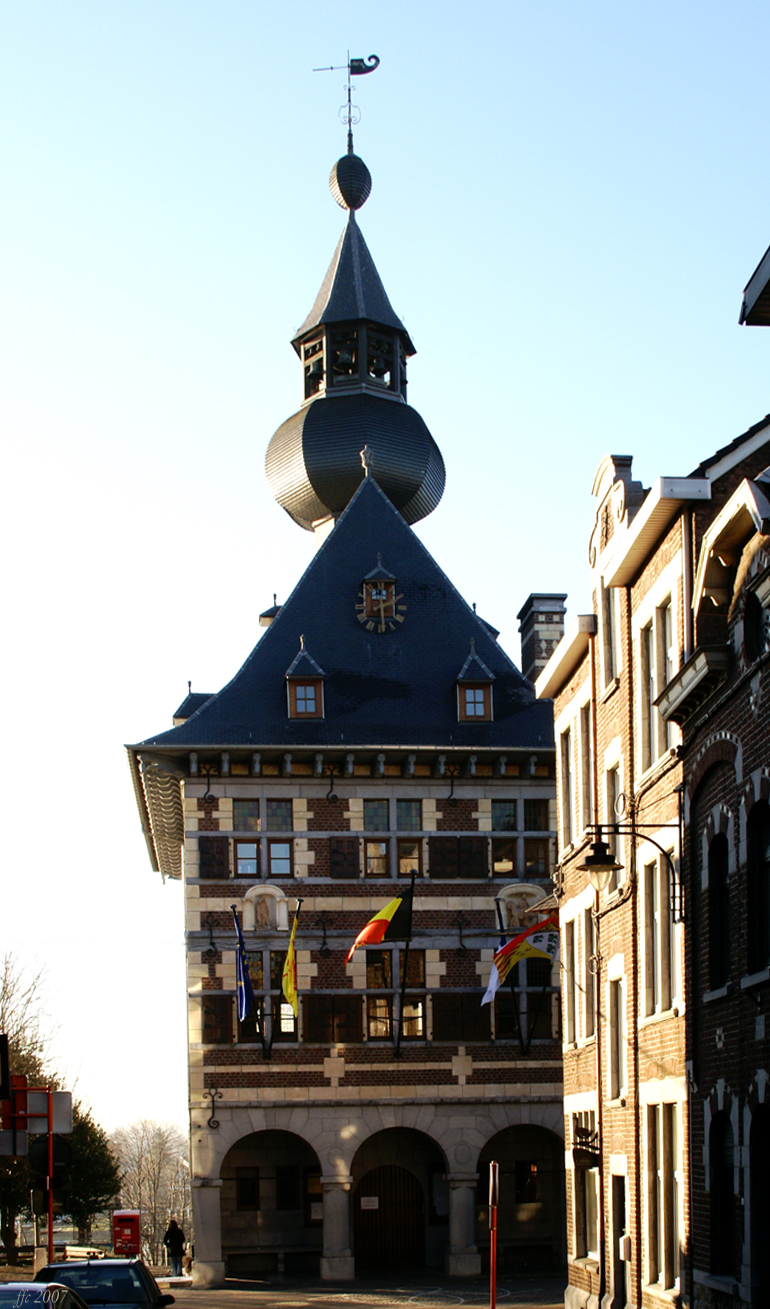
Town hall, Visé

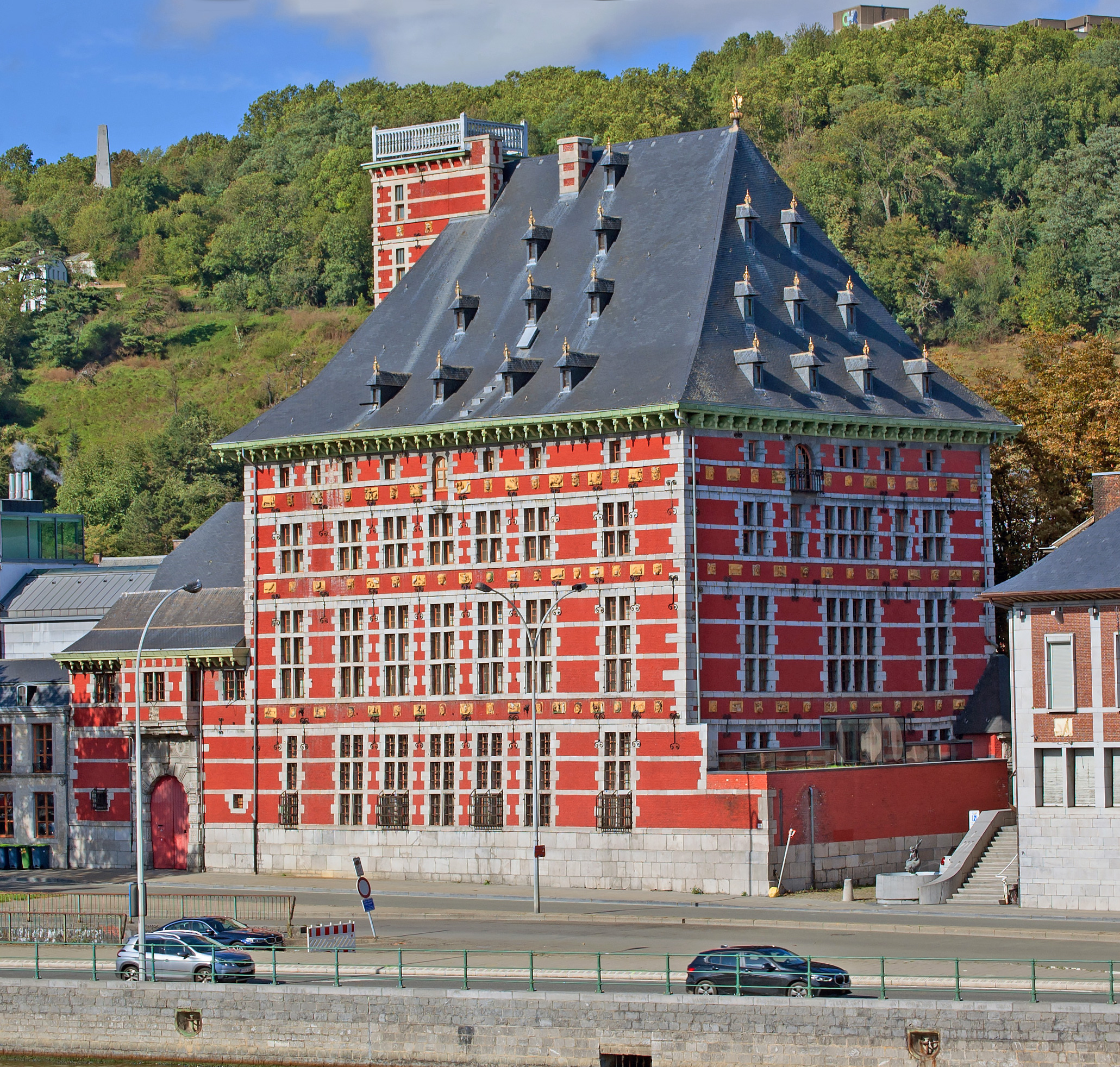
Curtius Museum, Liège, c. 1597 to 1610

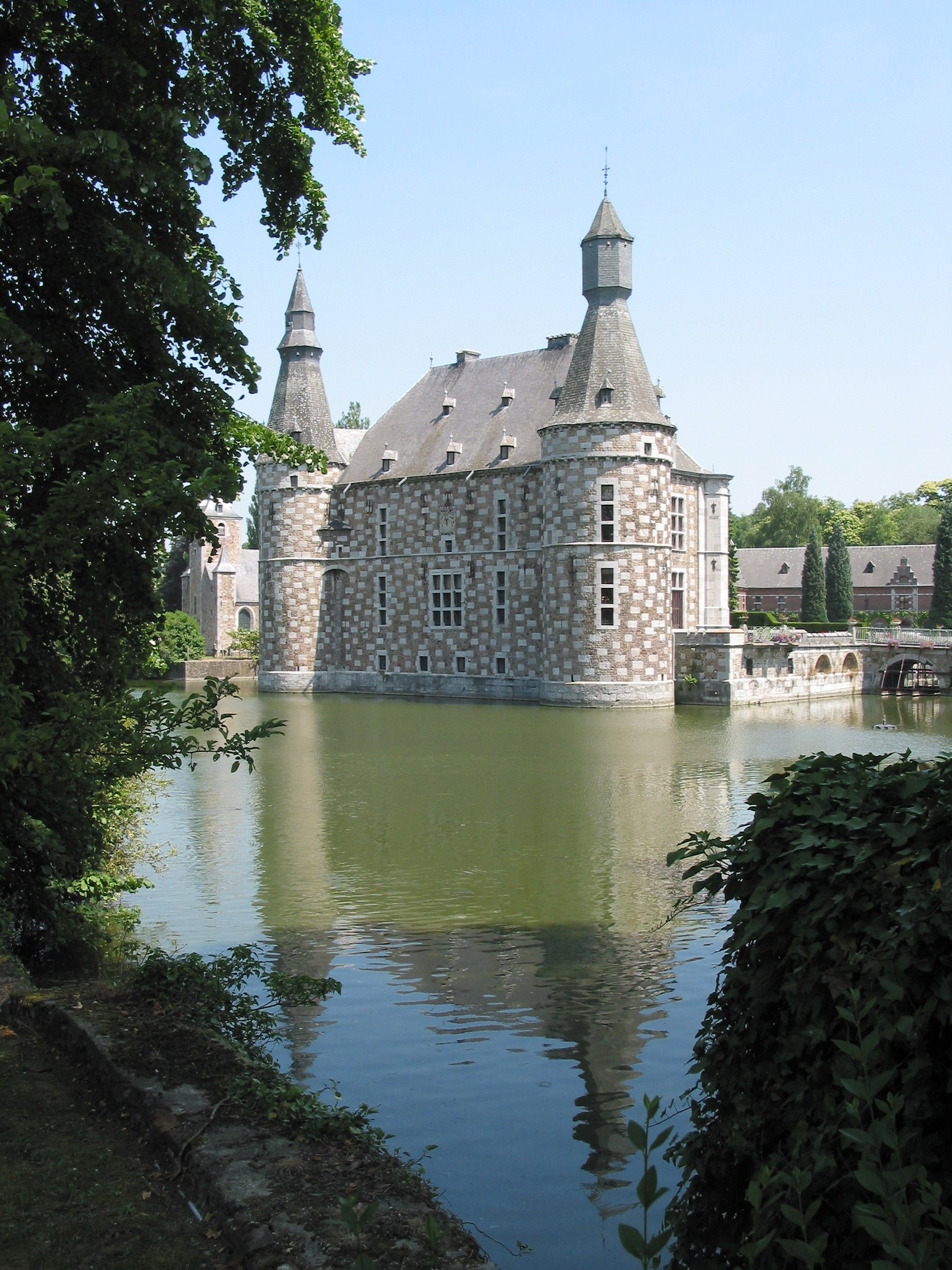
Castle of Jehay-Bodegnée

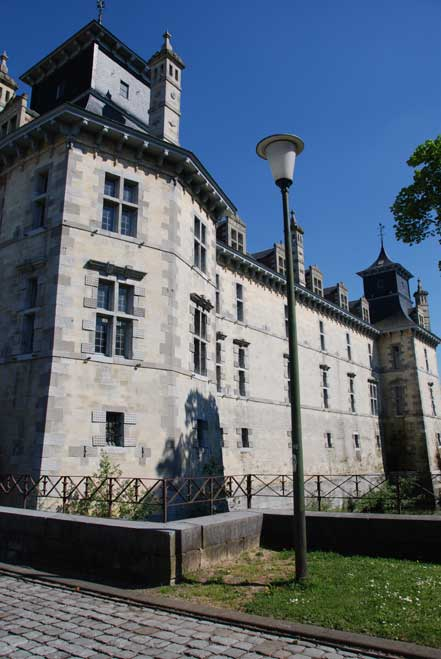
Aspremont-Lynden Castle

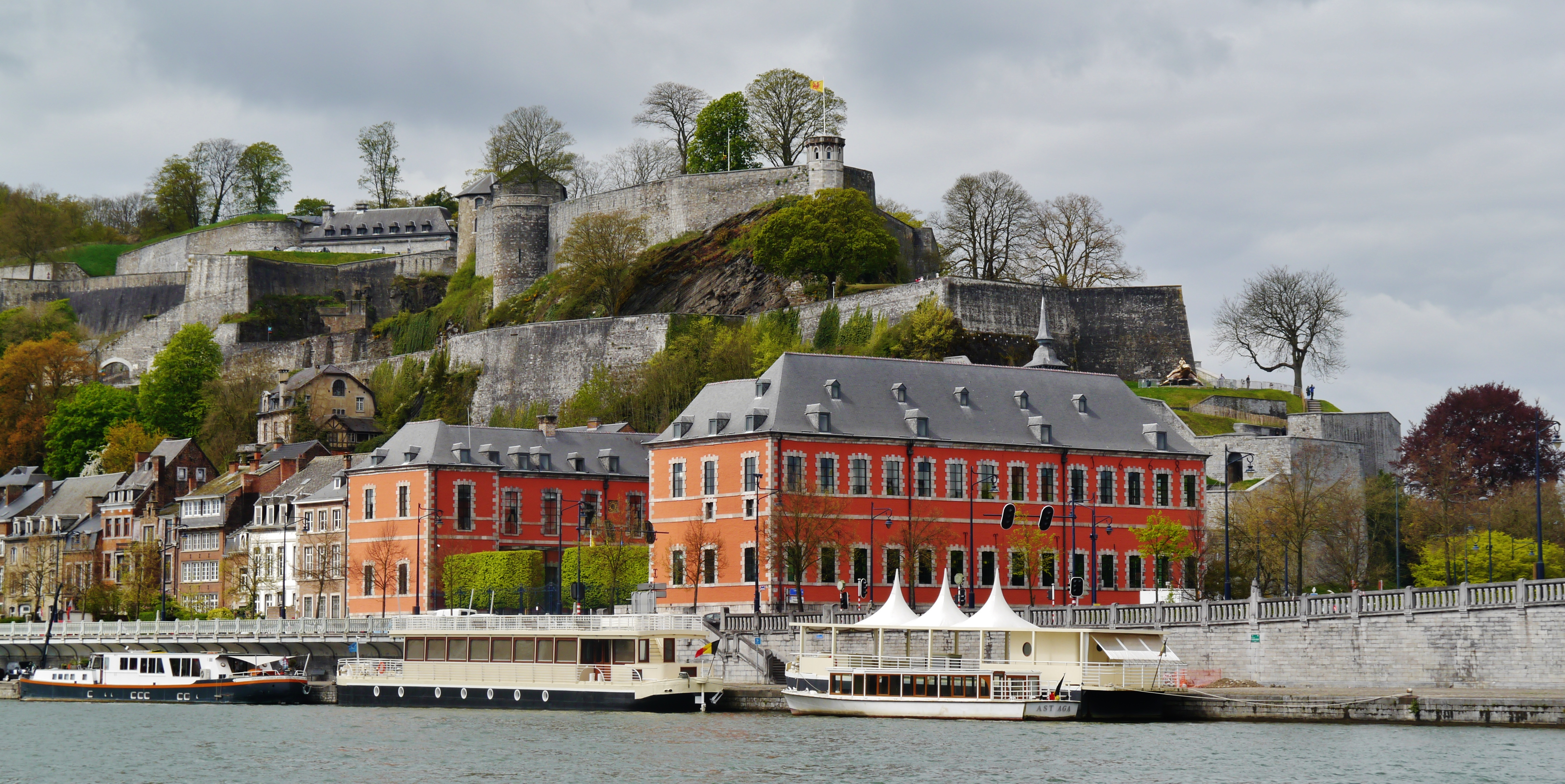
Parliament of Wallonia, Namur
