= Thimister-Clermont =

Municipality in Liège Province, Wallonia, Belgium

Thimister-Clermont Timister-Clairmont (Walloon)
- Municipality
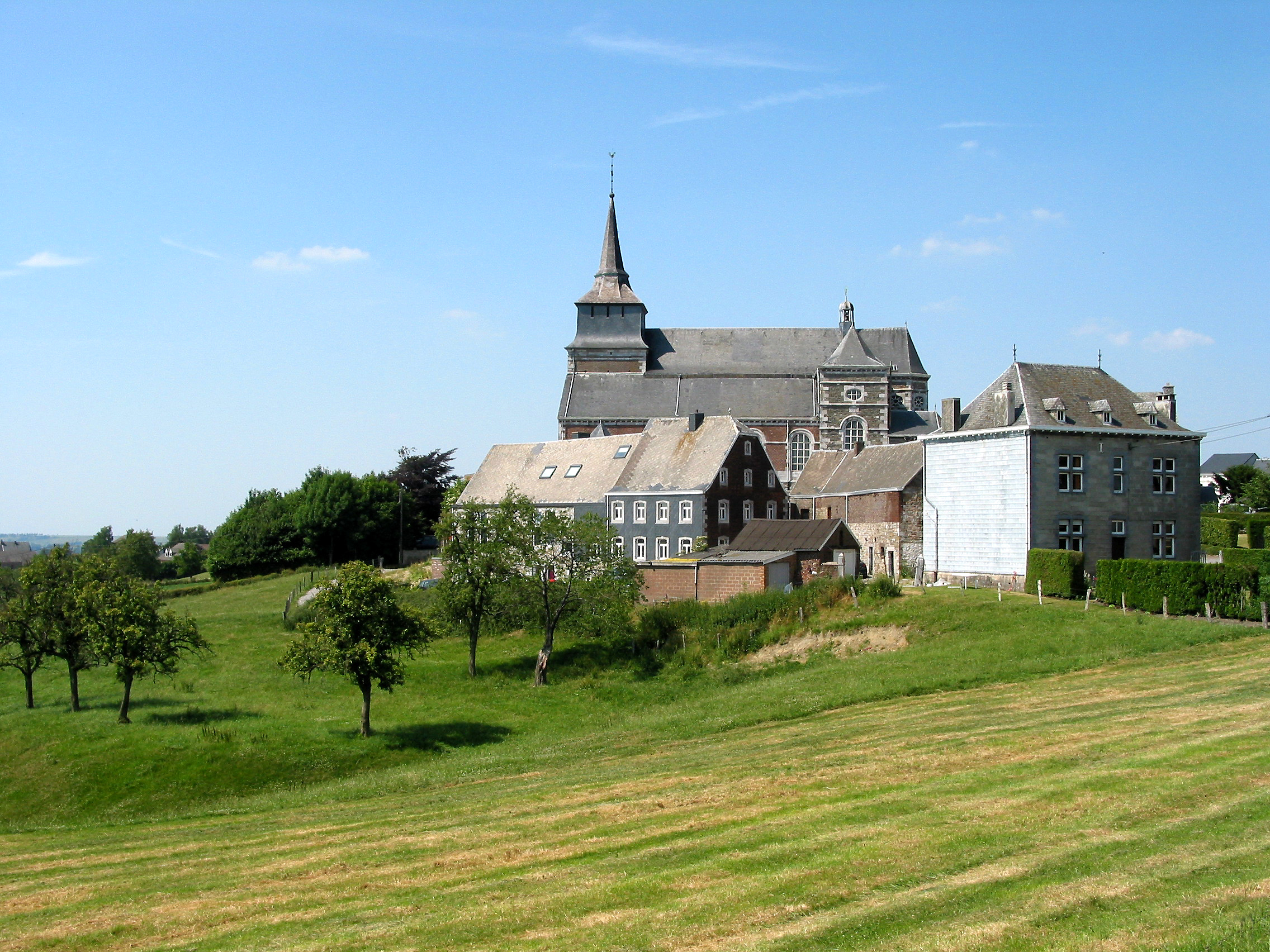

- Flag Coat of arms

- Location of Thimister-Clermont in the province of Liège
- Interactive map of Thimister-Clermont
- Location in Belgium
- Coordinates: 50°39′N 05°51′E
- Country: Belgium
- Community: French Community
- Region: Wallonia
- Province: Liège
- Arrondissement: Verviers

Government
  - Mayor: Lambert Demonceau
  - Governing party: Entente d'Intérêts Communaux

Area
  - Total: 28.64 km^{2} (11.06 sq mi)

Population (2018-01-01)
  - Total: 5,725
  - Density: 199.9/km^{2} (517.7/sq mi)
- Postal codes: 4890
- NIS code: 63089
- Area codes: 087
- Website: www.thimister-clermont.be

Thimister-Clermont (French pronunciation: [timistɛʁ klɛʁmɔ̃]; Walloon: Timister-Clairmont) is a municipality of Wallonia located in the province of Liège, Belgium.

On January 1, 2006, Thimister-Clermont had a total population of 5,296. The total area is 28.69 km^{2} which gives a population density of 185 inhabitants per km^{2}.

The municipality consists of the following districts: Clermont-sur-Berwinne, and Thimister. Clermont-sur-Berwinne is a member of the Les Plus Beaux Villages de Wallonie ("The Most Beautiful Villages of Wallonia") association.

== See also ==
- List of protected heritage sites in Thimister-Clermont
