= Diocese of Yokadouma =

Roman Catholic diocese in Cameroon

Coordinates: 3.5152°N 15.0519°E

Diocese of Yokadouma Dioecesis Yokadumana

Location
- Country: Cameroon
- Ecclesiastical province: Bertoua

Statistics
- Area: 11,767 sq mi (30,480 km^{2})
- Population: Total; Catholics: (as of 2022); 164,000; 25,600 (15.6%)
- Parishes: 14

Information
- Denomination: Catholic
- Sui iuris church: Latin Church
- Rite: Roman Rite
- Established: May 20, 1991 (35 years ago)
- Secular priests: 20

Current leadership
- Pope: Leo XIV
- Bishop: Justin Georges Ebengue
- Bishops emeritus: Paul Lontsié-Keuné (2017 - 2021)

The Roman Catholic Diocese of Yokadouma (Latin: Yokaduman(a)) is a suffragan Latin diocese in the ecclesiastical province of the Metropolitan of Bertoua in Eastern Cameroon, yet depends on the missionary Roman Congregation for the Evangelization of Peoples.

Its cathedral episcopal see is Cathédrale Marie Reine de la Paix, dedicated to Our Lady Queen of Peace, in the city of Yokadouma.

== History ==
It was established on May 20, 1991 on territory split off from the Diocese of Bertoua.

== Statistics ==
As per 2014, it pastorally served 20,050 Catholics (13.6% of 147,054 total) on 30,467 km^{2} in 14 parishes with 21 priests (16 diocesan, 5 religious), 38 lay religious (6 brothers, 32 sisters) and 5 seminarians.

== Episcopal ordinaries ==
(all Roman rite)

Suffragan Bishops of Yokadouma:

- Eugeniusz Juretzko, Missionary Oblates of Mary Immaculate (O.M.I.) (born Poland) (May 20, 1991 - April 25, 2017)
- Paul Lontsié-Keuné (first native incumbent) (April 25, 2017 – November 27, 2021), no previous prelature
- Justin Georges Ebengue (appointed January 10, 2025)

== See also ==
- List of Catholic dioceses in Cameroon
- Roman Catholicism in Cameroon

== Sources and external links ==
- GCatholic.org - data for all sections
