= List of protected heritage sites in Thimister-Clermont =

This table shows an overview of the protected heritage sites in the Walloon town Thimister-Clermont. This list is part of Belgium's national heritage.

Object	Year/architect	Town/section	Address	Coordinates	Number^{?}	Image
Organs of the church Saint Roch d'Elsaute ^{(nl)} ^{(fr)}		Thimister-Clermont		50.646214°N 5.895865°E	63089-CLT-0002-01 Info	Orgels van de kerk Saint Roch d'Elsaute
House for n ° 305 to Crawhez (now farm, n ° 44) ^{(nl)} ^{(fr)}		Thimister-Clermont		50.677300°N 5.882641°E	63089-CLT-0003-01 Info	Huis te n°305 te Crawhez (tegenwoordig boerderij, n° 44)
Castle farm the Crawhez: four walls, ceilings, fireplace on the ground floor ^{(nl)} ^{(fr)}		Thimister-Clermont	n°10	50.673430°N 5.885487°E	63089-CLT-0004-01 Info	Kasteelhoeve de Crawhez: vier gevels, daken, open haard op de begane grond
Chapel Sainte-Odile and ensemble formed by the building and the environment ^{(nl)} ^{(fr)}		Thimister-Clermont		50.655886°N 5.847443°E	63089-CLT-0006-01 Info	Kapel ('Sainte-Odile') en ensemble gevormd door het gebouw en de omgeving
Chapel of Saint-Roch ^{(nl)} ^{(fr)}		Thimister-Clermont		50.647416°N 5.862924°E	63089-CLT-0007-01 Info	Kapel Saint-Roch
Chapel of Saint-Anne ^{(nl)} ^{(fr)}		Thimister-Clermont		50.671036°N 5.880399°E	63089-CLT-0008-01 Info	Kapel Saint-Anne
Old town hall: walls, roofs and platform ^{(nl)} ^{(fr)}		Thimister-Clermont		50.659529°N 5.883593°E	63089-CLT-0009-01 Info	Oud sectionhuis: gevels, daken en bordes
Church of Saint-Jacques-le-Major: choir, narthex and a transept ^{(nl)} ^{(fr)}		Thimister-Clermont		50.659098°N 5.883098°E	63089-CLT-0010-01 Info	Kerk Saint-Jacques-le-Majeur: koor, narthex en een transept
Church of Saint-Jacques-le-Major: (including the transept and the choir where the narthex was classified by Royal Decree of 15 March 1934) (M) and ensemble formed by the church and cemetery around ^{(nl)} ^{(fr)}		Thimister-Clermont		50.659092°N 5.882987°E	63089-CLT-0011-01 Info	Kerk Saint-Jacques-le-Majeur: (inclusief het koor werden het transept en de narthex geklasseerd bij Koninklijk Besluit van 15 maart 1934) (M) en ensemble gevormd door de kerk en het kerkhof eromheen
Wall around cemetery at Church of Saint-Jacques-le-Major ^{(nl)} ^{(fr)}		Thimister-Clermont		50.658913°N 5.882703°E	63089-CLT-0012-01 Info	Muur rond begraafplaats bij kerk Saint-Jacques-le-Majeur
Ensemble formed by the square of Clermont-sur-Berwinne, Place de la Halle ^{(nl)} ^{(fr)}		Thimister-Clermont		50.659827°N 5.884108°E	63089-CLT-0013-01 Info	Ensemble gevormd door het dorpsplein van Clermont-sur-Berwinne, Place de la Halle
Memorial Fonck and its fence, chaussée Charlemagne ^{(nl)} ^{(fr)}		Thimister-Clermont		50.645600°N 5.851536°E	63089-CLT-0015-01 Info	Monument Fonck en zijn hek, chaussée Charlemagne
Facade, gable and roof of the house, place de la Halle 34 ^{(nl)} ^{(fr)}		Thimister-Clermont		50.659140°N 5.884575°E	63089-CLT-0016-01 Info	Voorgevel, puntgevel en het dak van het huis, place de la Halle 34

== See also ==
- List of protected heritage sites in Liège (province)
- Thimister-Clermont
