= Diocese of Bafoussam =

Roman Catholic diocese in Cameroon

Coordinates: 5.4886°N 10.4073°E

The Roman Catholic Diocese of Bafoussam (Latin: Bafussamen(sis)) is a diocese located in the city of Bafoussam in the ecclesiastical province of Douala in Cameroon.

== History ==
- February 5, 1970: Established as Diocese of Bafoussam from the Diocese of Nkongsamba

== Special churches ==
The cathedral is the Cathédrale Saint-Joseph in Bafoussam.

== Bishops ==
- Bishops of Bafoussam (Latin Rite)
  - Denis Ngande (February 5, 1970 – February 28, 1978)
  - André Wouking (March 15, 1979 – November 27, 1998), appointed Archbishop of Yaoundé
  - Joseph Atanga, S.J. (June 22, 1999 – December 3, 2009), appointed Archbishop of Bertoua
  - Dieudonné Watio (March 5, 2011 – March 19, 2021)
  - Paul Lontsié-Keuné (November 27, 2021 – Present)

=== Auxiliary bishops ===
- Gabriel Simo (1994-2013)
- Emmanuel Dassi Youfang, Comm. l'Emm. (2016-2020), appointed Bishop of Bafia

=== Other priest of this diocese who became bishop ===
- Paul Lontsié-Keuné, appointed Bishop of Yokadouma in 2017

== See also ==
- Roman Catholicism in Cameroon
