= Diocese of Doumé–Abong' Mbang =

Roman Catholic diocese in Cameroon

Coordinates: 4.2466°N 13.4426°E

Diocese of Doumé–Abong' Mbang Dioecesis Dumensis-Abongensis-Mbangensis Diocèse de Doumé–Abong' Mbang
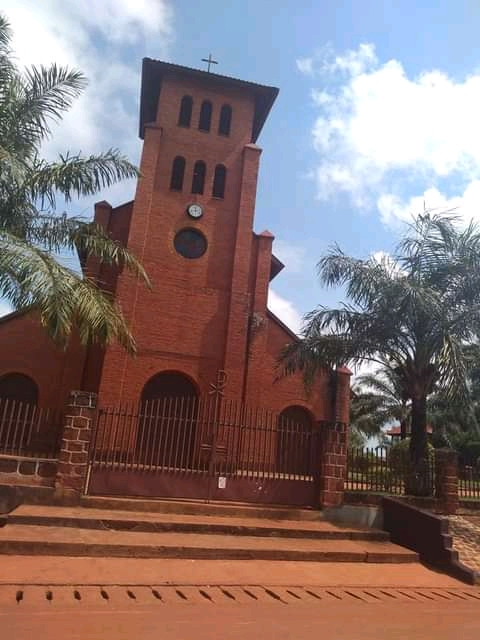

Location
- Country: Cameroon
- Metropolitan: Archdiocese of Bertoua
- Headquarters: Doumé, Cameroon

Statistics
- Area: 36,378 km^{2} (14,046 sq mi)
- Population: Total; Catholics: (as of 2023); 293,000; 145,500 (49.7%)
- Parishes: 34

Information
- Denomination: Catholic Church
- Sui iuris church: Latin Church
- Rite: Roman Rite
- Established: 3 March 1949; 77 years ago
- Secular priests: 66

Current leadership
- Pope: Leo XIV
- Bishop: Jan Ozga
- Metropolitan Archbishop: Joseph Atanga, S.J.

The Roman Catholic Diocese of Doumé–Abong’ Mbang (Latin: Dumen(sis)–Abongen(sis)–Mbangen(sis)) is a diocese located in the cities of Doumé and Abong’ Mbang in the ecclesiastical province of Bertoua in Cameroon.

== History ==
- 3 March 1949: Established as Apostolic Vicariate of Doumé from the Apostolic Vicariate of Yaoundé
- 14 September 1955: Promoted as Diocese of Doumé
- 17 March 1983: Renamed as Diocese of Doumé–Abong’ Mbang

== Bishops ==
=== Ordinaries, in reverse chronological order ===
- Bishops of Doumé–Abong’ Mbang (Roman Rite)
  - Bishop Jan Ozga (20 April 1997 – present)
  - Bishop Pierre Augustin Tchouanga, S.C.I. (17 March 1983 – 24 February 1995), resigned
- Bishops of Doumé (Roman Rite)
  - Bishop Lambertus Johannes van Heygen, C.S.Sp. (16 April 1962 – 17 March 1983), appointed Bishop of Bertoua
  - Bishop Jacques Teerenstra, C.S.Sp. (14 September 1955 – 28 January 1961); see below
- Vicars Apostolic of Doumé (Roman Rite)
  - Bishop Jacques Teerenstra, C.S.Sp. (15 March 1951 – 14 September 1955); see above
  - Bishop René Graffin, C.S.Sp. (3 March 1949 – 15 March 1951), resigned

=== Auxiliary bishop ===
- Jacques Teerenstra, C.S.Sp. (1949–1951), appointed Vicar Apostolic here

== See also ==
- Roman Catholicism in Cameroon
