= Clermont-sur-Berwinne =

Clermont-sur-Berwinne Clairmont-so-Berwinne (Walloon)
- Clermont-sur-Berwinne, former town hall

- Location within Belgium Location within Europe
- Coordinates: 50°39′32″N 05°53′06″E
- Country: Belgium
- Region: Wallonia
- Province: Liège
- Municipality: Thimister-Clermont

Clermont-sur-Berwinne (French pronunciation: [klɛʁmɔ̃ syʁ bɛʁwin]; Walloon: Clairmont-so-Berwinne) is a village of Wallonia and a district of the municipality of Thimister-Clermont, located in the province of Liège, Belgium.

The village is a member of the association Les Plus Beaux Villages de Wallonie.

The oldest mentions of the village date from the 13th century. The church was built 1628–1832, with elements incorporated from an earlier church built in 1567. The former town hall dates from 1888, built in a Renaissance Revival style inspired by Mosan Renaissance architecture, of which the village has some fine original examples. There is also a fortified farm from the 17th century in the village.
