= Samuel Kleda =

Cameroonian Catholic prelate (born 1959)

The Most Reverend Samuel Kleda
- Archbishop of Douala, Cameroon
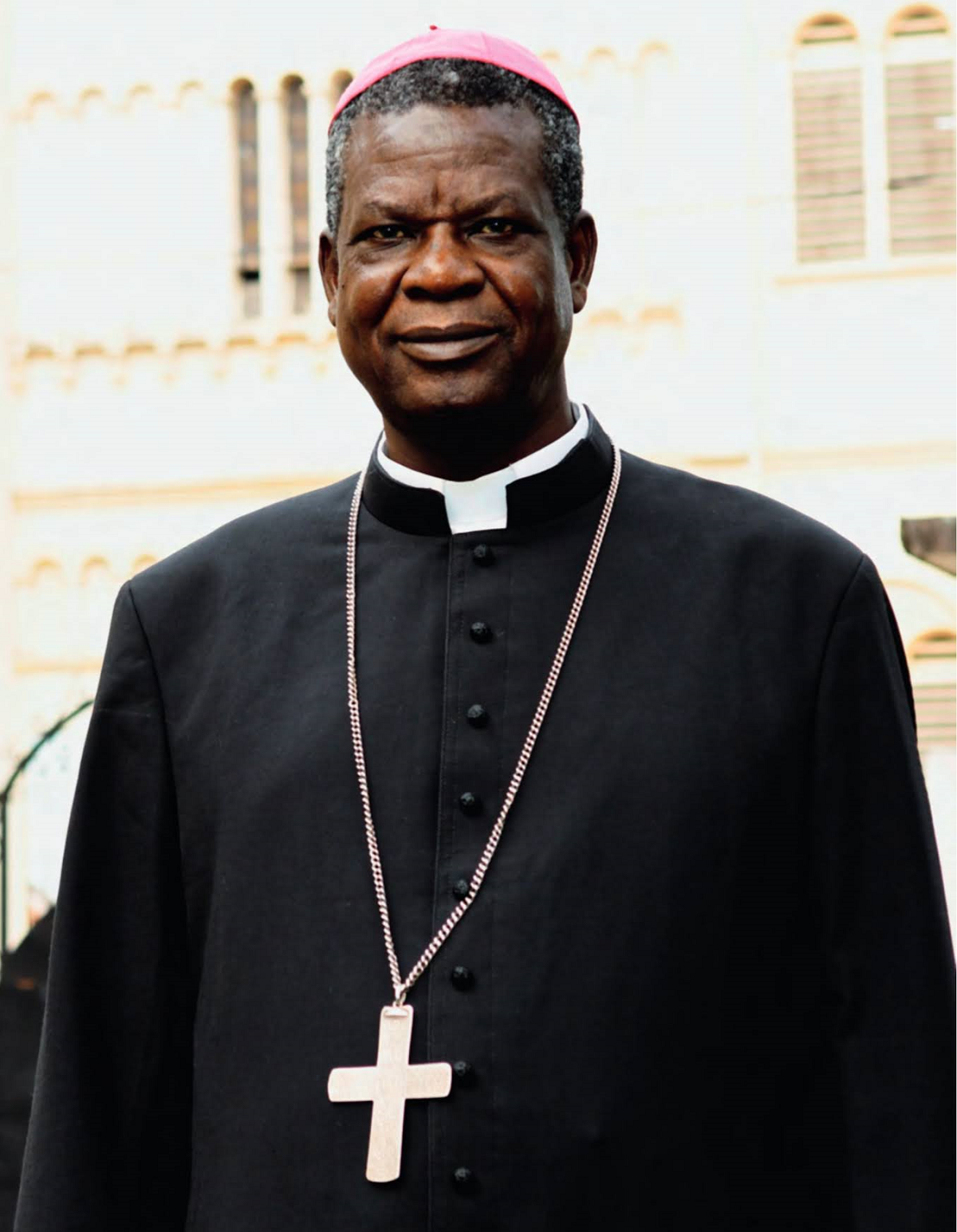
- Image of Archbishop Samuel Kleda
- Church: Catholic Church
- Archdiocese: Roman Catholic Archdiocese of Douala
- See: Catholic Diocese of Douala
- Appointed: 17 November 2009
- Installed: 17 November 2009
- Predecessor: Christian Wiyghan Tumi (31 August 1991 - 17 November 2009)
- Successor: Incumbent
- Other posts: Coadjutor Bishop of the Archdiocese of Douala (3 November 2007 - 17 November 2009); Bishop of the Diocese of Batouri (23 October 2000 - 3 November 2007)

Orders
- Ordination: 9 March 1986
- Consecration: 18 February 2001 by Christian Wiyghan Tumi
- Rank: Archbishop

Personal details
- Born: Samuel Kleda; 1 January 1959 (age 67) Golompuy, North Region, Cameroon
- Motto: "Amore omnia vincit" (Love conquers all)

Styles of Samuel Kleda
- Reference style: Your Lordship; The Most Reverend
- Spoken style: His Lordship
- Religious style: Bishop

Samuel Kleda (born 1959) is a Cameroonian Catholic prelate who has served as the archbishop of the Roman Catholic Archdiocese of Douala, in Cameroon since 17 November 2009. Before that, from 3 November 2007, he was the Coadjutor Bishop of the same Ecclesiastical Metropolitan Province. From 23 October 2000 until 3 November 2007, he served as Bishop of the Roman Catholic Diocese of Batouri, Cameroon. Pope John Paul II appointed him bishop. He was consecrated on 18 February 2001 by Christian Wiyghan Tumi, Archbishop of Douala. On 3 November 2007, Pope Benedict XVI transferred him to Douala and appointed him Coadjutor Bishop there. On 17 November 2009, he succeeded at Douala and continues to serve as the Archbishop of Douala, Cameroon.

== Background and education ==
He was born in 1959 in Golompuy, North Region, Cameroon. He studied both philosophy and theology at seminary before he was ordained a priest.

== Priest ==
On 9 March 1986, he was ordained a priest. He served as a priest until 23 October 2000.

== Bishop ==
On 23 October 2000, Pope John Paul II appointed him as bishop of the Roman Catholic Diocese of Batouri, Cameroon, a suffragan of the Roman Catholic Archdiocese of Bertoua. He was consecrated bishop on 18 February 2001 by Cardinal Christian Wiyghan Tumi, Archbishop of Douala assisted by Roger Pirenne, Archbishop of Bertoua and Félix del Blanco Prieto, Titular Archbishop of Vannida.

Pope Benedict XVI transferred Bishop Samuel Kleda from the Bartouri Diocese to the Archdiocese of Douala and appointed him coadjutor bishop there on 3 November 2007.

On 17 November 2009, the Holy Father accepted the resignation from the pastoral care of the Ecclesiastical Metropolitan Province of Douala presented by Cardinal Christian Wiyghan Tumi. That same day Bishop Samuel Kleda, previously Coadjutor Bishop, succeeded as the local ordinary at Doula.

== See also ==
- Catholic Church in Cameroon

== Succession table ==
Catholic Church titles
Preceded by Christian Wiyghan Tumi (31 August 1991 - 17 November 2009)	Archbishop of Douala (since 17 November 2009)	Succeeded by Incumbent
Preceded by	Coadjutor Bishop of Douala (3 November 2007 - 17 November 2009)	Succeeded by
Preceded by Roger Pirenne (3 February 1994 - 3 June 1999)	Bishop of Batouri (23 October 2000 - 3 November 2007)	Succeeded by Faustin Ambassa Ndjodo (3 December 2009 - 22 October 2016)
