= Archdiocese of Bertoua =

Roman Catholic archdiocese in Cameroon

Coordinates: 4.5778°N 13.6836°E

Archdiocese of Bertoua Archidioecesis Bertuana Archidiocèse de Bertoua
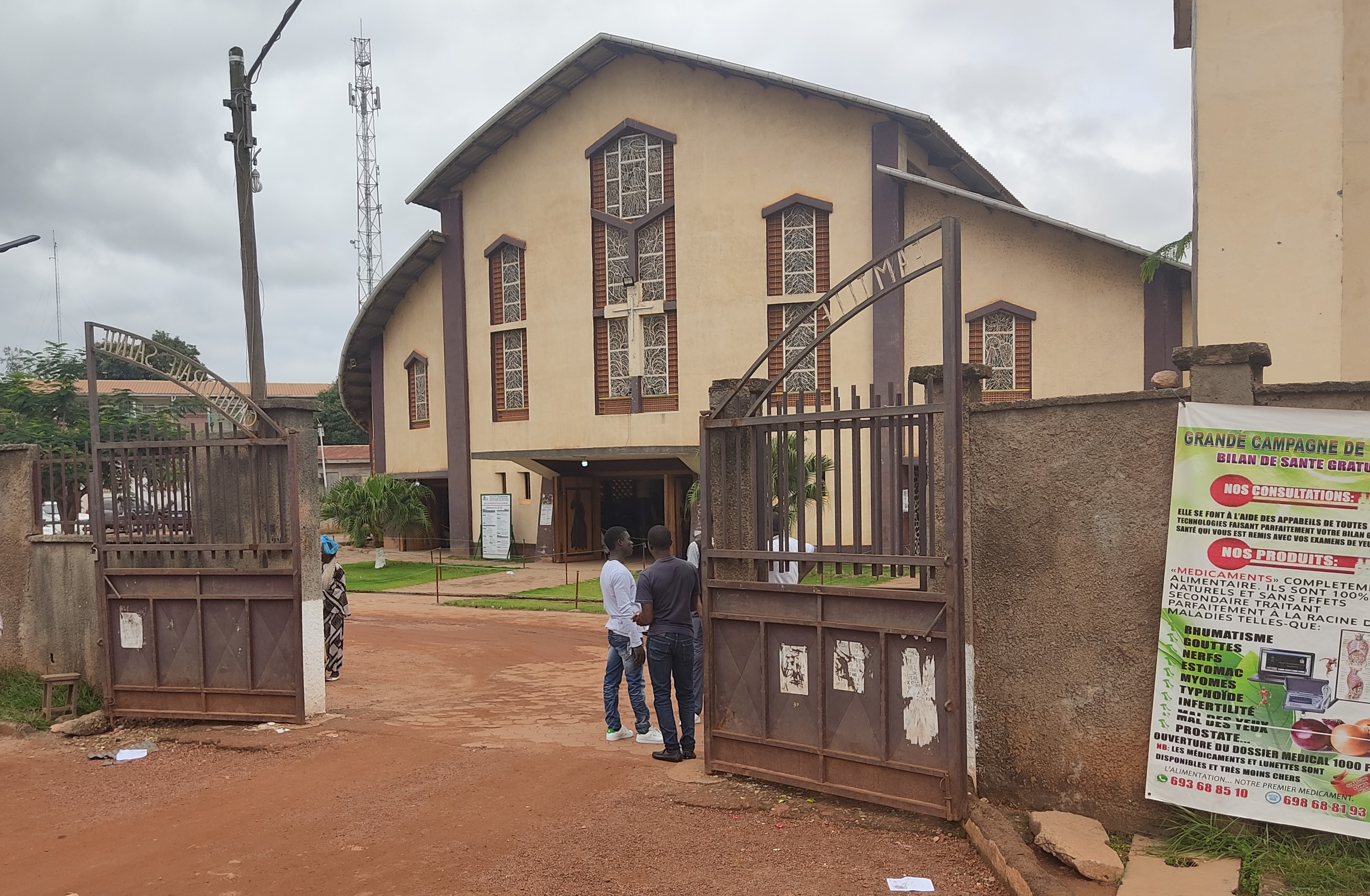

Location
- Country: Cameroon
- Headquarters: Bertoua, Cameroon

Statistics
- Area: 26,320 km^{2} (10,160 sq mi)
- Population: Total; Catholics: (as of 2023); 420,000; 253,000 (60.2%)
- Parishes: 48

Information
- Denomination: Catholic Church
- Sui iuris church: Latin Church
- Rite: Roman Rite
- Established: 17 March 1983; 43 years ago
- Cathedral: Cathédrale de la Sainte-Famille in Bertoua
- Secular priests: 116

Current leadership
- Pope: Leo XIV
- Metropolitan Archbishop: Joseph Atanga, S.J.

The Roman Catholic Archdiocese of Bertoua is the Metropolitan See for the ecclesiastical province of Bertoua in Cameroon.

== History ==
- 17 March 1983: Established as Diocese of Bertoua from the Diocese of Doumé
- 11 November 1994: Promoted as Metropolitan Archdiocese of Bertoua

== Special churches ==
The seat of the archbishop is Holy Family Cathedral in Bertoua.

== Bishops ==
=== Ordinaries, in reverse chronological order ===
- Metropolitan Archbishops of Bertoua (Latin Rite), below
  - Joseph Atanga, S.J. (3 December 2009 – Present)
  - Roger Pirenne, C.I.C.M. (3 June 1999 – 3 December 2009), retired
  - Lambertus Johannes van Heygen, C.S.Sp. (11 November 1994 – 3 June 1999), retired; see below
- Bishop of Bertoua (Latin Rite), below
  - Lambertus Johannes van Heygen, C.S.Sp. (17 March 1983 – 11 November 1994); see above

== Suffragan Dioceses ==
- Batouri
- Doumé–Abong’ Mbang
- Yokadouma

== See also ==
- Roman Catholicism in Cameroon

== Sources ==
- GCatholic.org
